= List of trails in Teton County, Wyoming =

There are at least 93 named trails in Teton County, Wyoming according to the U.S. Geological Survey, Board of Geographic Names. A trail is defined as: "Route for passage from one point to another; does not include roads or highways (jeep trail, path, ski trail)."

- Alaska Basin Trail, 43°42′5″N 110°51′50″W, el. 8,878 feet (2,706 m)
- Alaska Basin Trail, 43°43′5″N 110°54′07″W, el. 7,296 feet (2,224 m)
- Amphitheater Lake Trail, 43°43′5″N 110°45′58″W, el. 8,560 feet (2,610 m)
- Andy Stone Trail, 43°49′5″N 110°55′33″W, el. 8,363 feet (2,549 m)
- Arizona Creek Trail, 44°02′5″N 110°37′16″W, el. 7,874 feet (2,400 m)
- Atlantic Pacific Creek Trail, 43°57′5″N 110°24′17″W, el. 7,116 feet (2,169 m)
- Badger Creek Trail, 43°53′5″N 110°55′42″W, el. 7,605 feet (2,318 m)
- Bear Canyon Trail, 43°55′5″N 110°55′25″W, el. 8,868 feet (2,703 m)
- Beaver Creek Trail, 43°41′5″N 110°44′47″W, el. 6,749 feet (2,057 m)
- Bechler River Trail, 44°13′5″N 110°58′34″W, el. 6,460 feet (1,970 m)
- Berry Creek Trail, 43°59′41″N 110°42′35″W, el. 6,778 feet (2,066 m)
- Beula Lake Trail, 44°08′5″N 110°46′32″W, el. 7,585 feet (2,312 m)
- Big Game Ridge Cutoff Trail, 44°04′5″N 110°21′15″W, el. 8,766 feet (2,672 m)
- Bitch Creek Trail, 43°56′5″N 110°54′38″W, el. 6,982 feet (2,128 m)
- Boundary Creek Trail, 44°12′5″N 111°00′52″W, el. 6,394 feet (1,949 m)
- Bradley Lake Trail, 43°42′5″N 110°44′55″W, el. 7,050 feet (2,150 m)
- Camp Lake Trail, 43°55′5″N 110°51′51″W, el. 8,609 feet (2,624 m)
- Cascade Canyon Trail, 43°45′5″N 110°45′50″W, el. 7,467 feet (2,276 m)
- Clear Creek Trail, 43°52′5″N 110°15′49″W, el. 7,664 feet (2,336 m)
- Coulter Creek Tail, 44°01′5″N 110°24′47″W, el. 8,199 feet (2,499 m)
- Coulter Creek Trail, 44°07′5″N 110°30′11″W, el. 7,224 feet (2,202 m)
- Coulter-Wolverine Cutoff Trail, 44°05′5″N 110°27′02″W, el. 8,163 feet (2,488 m)
- De Lacy Creek Trail, 44°23′5″N 110°40′51″W, el. 7,802 feet (2,378 m)
- Death Canyon Trail, 43°39′11″N 110°48′24″W, el. 6,690 feet (2,040 m)
- DeCoster Trail, 43°52′5″N 111°02′41″W, el. 6,936 feet (2,114 m)
- Divide Trail, 43°57′5″N 110°15′51″W, el. 7,976 feet (2,431 m)
- Elephant Back Loop Trail, 44°34′5″N 110°24′54″W, el. 8,625 feet (2,629 m)
- Emma Matilda Lake Trail, 43°53′5″N 110°31′18″W, el. 7,014 feet (2,138 m)
- Enos Creek Cutoff Trail, 43°59′5″N 110°17′40″W, el. 7,510 feet (2,290 m)
- Enos Lake Trail, 43°59′5″N 110°14′46″W, el. 7,848 feet (2,392 m)
- Fairy Creek Trail, 44°30′5″N 110°54′08″W, el. 7,985 feet (2,434 m)
- Game Creek Trail, 43°36′5″N 110°57′33″W, el. 8,907 feet (2,715 m)
- Granite Canyon Trail, 43°36′5″N 110°49′39″W, el. 7,037 feet (2,145 m)
- Granite Highline Trail, 43°23′5″N 110°34′59″W, el. 8,891 feet (2,710 m)
- Green Mountain Trail, 43°50′5″N 110°55′55″W, el. 8,317 feet (2,535 m)
- Harebell Trail, 44°08′5″N 110°30′24″W, el. 7,274 feet (2,217 m)
- Hermitage Point Trail, 43°52′5″N 110°37′19″W, el. 6,804 feet (2,074 m)
- Hidden Falls Horse Trail, 43°45′5″N 110°44′39″W, el. 7,195 feet (2,193 m)
- Jenny Lake Moraine Horse Trail, 43°46′5″N 110°42′47″W, el. 6,860 feet (2,090 m)
- Jenny Lake Trail, 43°46′5″N 110°43′02″W, el. 6,860 feet (2,090 m)
- Lake Solitude Trail, 43°46′5″N 110°49′41″W, el. 8,396 feet (2,559 m)
- Lava Creek Trail, 43°52′5″N 110°22′40″W, el. 8,297 feet (2,529 m)
- Mallard Lake Trail, 44°28′5″N 110°47′05″W, el. 8,064 feet (2,458 m)
- Mary Mountain Trail, 44°35′5″N 110°38′56″W, el. 7,871 feet (2,399 m)
- Middle Fork Cut Off Trail, 43°36′5″N 110°54′56″W, el. 8,861 feet (2,701 m)
- Middle Pilgrim Trail, 44°01′5″N 110°31′47″W, el. 8,464 feet (2,580 m)
- Mink Creek Cutoff Trail, 44°05′5″N 110°18′09″W, el. 8,599 feet (2,621 m)
- Moss Lake Trail, 43°58′5″N 110°19′18″W, el. 7,907 feet (2,410 m)
- Mount Sheridan Trail, 44°16′5″N 110°31′11″W, el. 8,268 feet (2,520 m)
- North Bitch Creek Trail, 43°59′5″N 110°58′02″W, el. 7,093 feet (2,162 m)
- North Buffalo Trail, 43°55′5″N 110°12′24″W, el. 7,808 feet (2,380 m)
- North Fish Creek Trail, 43°42′5″N 110°05′35″W, el. 8,996 feet (2,742 m)
- North Leigh Creek Trail, 43°51′5″N 110°56′19″W, el. 7,218 feet (2,200 m)
- Old Fountain Trail, 44°35′5″N 110°55′33″W, el. 7,858 feet (2,395 m)
- Old Marysville Road, 44°10′5″N 110°54′27″W, el. 6,545 feet (1,995 m)
- Open Canyon Trail, 43°37′5″N 110°51′05″W, el. 9,321 feet (2,841 m)
- Owl Creek Trail, 43°58′5″N 110°50′28″W, el. 8,130 feet (2,480 m)
- Paintbrush Canyon Trail, 43°48′5″N 110°44′43″W, el. 7,451 feet (2,271 m)
- Paintbrush Divide Trail, 43°47′5″N 110°49′51″W, el. 9,547 feet (2,910 m)
- Pass Creek Trail, 43°29′5″N 110°05′03″W, el. 9,370 feet (2,860 m)
- Phillips Canyon Trail, 43°32′5″N 110°55′20″W, el. 8,455 feet (2,577 m)
- Pilgrim Creek Trail, 44°01′5″N 110°30′22″W, el. 8,077 feet (2,462 m)
- Pitchstone Plateau Trail, 44°11′5″N 110°48′11″W, el. 8,048 feet (2,453 m)
- Poacher Trail, 43°57′5″N 110°58′56″W, el. 7,047 feet (2,148 m)
- Purdy Basin Trail, 43°34′5″N 110°07′34″W, el. 7,900 feet (2,400 m)
- Rendezvous Mountain Trail, 43°35′5″N 110°53′58″W, el. 9,019 feet (2,749 m)
- Riddle Lake Trail, 44°21′5″N 110°33′46″W, el. 7,936 feet (2,419 m)
- Rodent Creek Trail, 44°04′5″N 110°32′49″W, el. 8,018 feet (2,444 m)
- Sheffield Creek Trail, 44°05′5″N 110°37′39″W, el. 8,504 feet (2,592 m)
- Shoshone Lake Trail, 44°19′5″N 110°44′57″W, el. 7,985 feet (2,434 m)
- Snake River Trail, 44°06′5″N 110°18′52″W, el. 8,218 feet (2,505 m)
- Soda Fork Trail, 43°55′5″N 110°04′26″W, el. 8,373 feet (2,552 m)
- South Boundary Trail, 44°09′5″N 110°36′44″W, el. 6,978 feet (2,127 m)
- South Entrance Trail, 44°17′5″N 110°36′44″W, el. 7,785 feet (2,373 m)
- South Leigh Creek Trail, 43°48′5″N 110°56′39″W, el. 7,126 feet (2,172 m)
- Spruce Creek Trail, 43°42′5″N 110°03′53″W, el. 9,383 feet (2,860 m)
- String Lake Trail, 43°47′5″N 110°44′13″W, el. 6,982 feet (2,128 m)
- Summit Lake Trail, 44°26′5″N 110°54′40″W, el. 8,182 feet (2,494 m)
- Taggart Lake Trail, 43°42′5″N 110°44′33″W, el. 6,880 feet (2,100 m)
- Taylor Mountain Trail, 43°32′5″N 110°58′30″W, el. 9,216 feet (2,809 m)
- Teton Crest Trail, 43°36′5″N 110°55′18″W, el. 9,025 feet (2,751 m)
- Trail Creek Trail, 44°16′5″N 110°19′16″W, el. 7,805 feet (2,379 m)
- Trail Creek Trail, 44°17′5″N 110°14′21″W, el. 7,805 feet (2,379 m)
- Trail Creek Trail, 44°01′5″N 110°10′50″W, el. 8,366 feet (2,550 m)
- Two Ocean Lake Trail, 43°54′5″N 110°31′16″W, el. 6,936 feet (2,114 m)
- Two Ocean Plateau Trail, 44°12′5″N 110°15′43″W, el. 8,684 feet (2,647 m)
- Union Falls Trail, 44°11′5″N 110°53′04″W, el. 6,614 feet (2,016 m)
- Valley Trail, 43°43′5″N 110°44′33″W, el. 6,991 feet (2,131 m)
- Valley Trail, 43°39′5″N 110°46′31″W, el. 6,844 feet (2,086 m)
- Valley Trail, 43°43′5″N 110°45′33″W, el. 7,359 feet (2,243 m)
- Webb Canyon Trail, 43°59′5″N 110°44′04″W, el. 6,959 feet (2,121 m)
- West Cutoff Trail, 44°01′5″N 110°26′57″W, el. 8,651 feet (2,637 m)
- West Pilgrim Trail, 44°01′5″N 110°32′57″W, el. 8,527 feet (2,599 m)
- Whetstone Creek Trail, 43°58′5″N 110°25′07″W, el. 7,739 feet (2,359 m)

== See also ==
- List of trails in Wyoming
