= List of hiking trails in Grand Teton National Park =

The hiking trails in Grand Teton National Park range from easy nature walks on generally level surfaces to strenuous and oftentimes steep climbs over high mountain passes. Located south of Yellowstone National Park in the northwestern section of the U.S. state of Wyoming, Grand Teton National Park has 200 miles (320 km) of trails. High mountain passes such as Paintbrush Divide, Hurricane Pass and Static Peak Divide are more than 4,000 feet (1,200 m) above the trail starting points and may remain snow-covered until mid-summer, requiring the use of an ice axe and possibly crampons to negotiate in late spring and early summer.

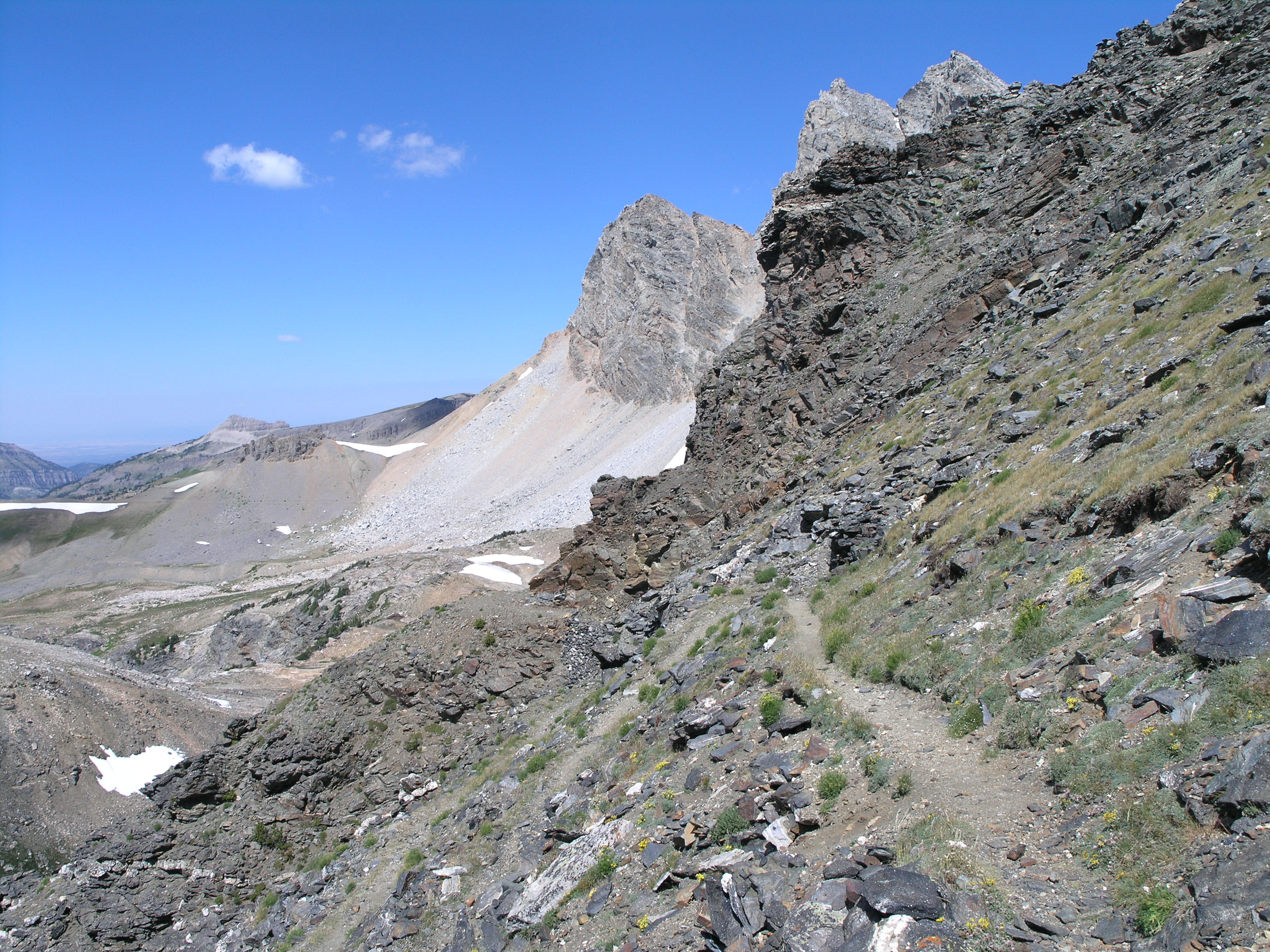
Alaska Basin Trail near Static Peak Divide looking north into Alaska Basin

- Alaska Basin Trail is a 7.5-mile-long (12.1 km) trail extending into Caribou-Targhee National Forest. The trail begins at junction on Death Canyon Trail near the Death Canyon Barn and climbs steeply to Static Peak Divide. From the divide the trail soon splits, with a western branch descending into Alaska Basin and the eastern trail (also known as the Alaska Basin Shelf Trail) continuing north to junction with the Teton Crest Trail. This trail is considered very strenuous.
- Amphitheater Lake Trail ascends from Lupine Meadows to Amphitheater Lake. The trail is considered strenuous with 3,150 feet (960 m) of total elevation gain in just over 5 miles (8.0 km).
- Berry Creek Trail is 12 miles (19 km) long and located in the far northern region of the park. The trail begins at the National Park Service patrol cabin north of Wilcox Point on Jackson Lake and extends to Jackass Pass at the border between the park and Caribou-Targhee National Forest. Located in the remote northern backcountry of Grand Teton National Park, the trail is not connected to maintained trails in the southern part of the park and must be accessed from the Glade Creek trailhead in the John D. Rockefeller, Jr. Memorial Parkway. The trails in this region may require dangerous stream crossings.
- Bradley Lake Trail is a moderate 3-mile-long (4.8 km) trail which connects the Taggart Lake trailhead to Bradley Lake.
- Cascade Canyon Trail extends from Jenny Lake to the north and south forks of Cascade Canyon. The trail is 6.8 miles (10.9 km) long (13.6 mi (21.9 km) round trip) and is considered moderate to strenuous. To get to Cascade Canyon there is about a mile hike up the mountain that is strenuous. A boat shuttle across Jenny Lake at the beginning and end of the hike shaves 4 miles (6.4 km) off the round trip. This is one of the most popular trails in the park and provides the only access to the popular Hidden Falls cascade.
- Colter Bay Lakeshore Trail is an easy 2-mile-long (3.2 km) round-trip nature trail forming two interconnected loops along Jackson Lake and Colter Bay.
- Death Canyon Trail is 13.5 miles (21.7 km) long and begins at the White Grass Ranger Station Historic District and ends at Fox Creek Pass where it intercepts the Teton Crest Trail. The trail follows the length of Death Canyon and is strenuous.
- Emma Matilda Lake Trail is a 10.7-mile (17.2 km) round-trip trail and is considered moderate.

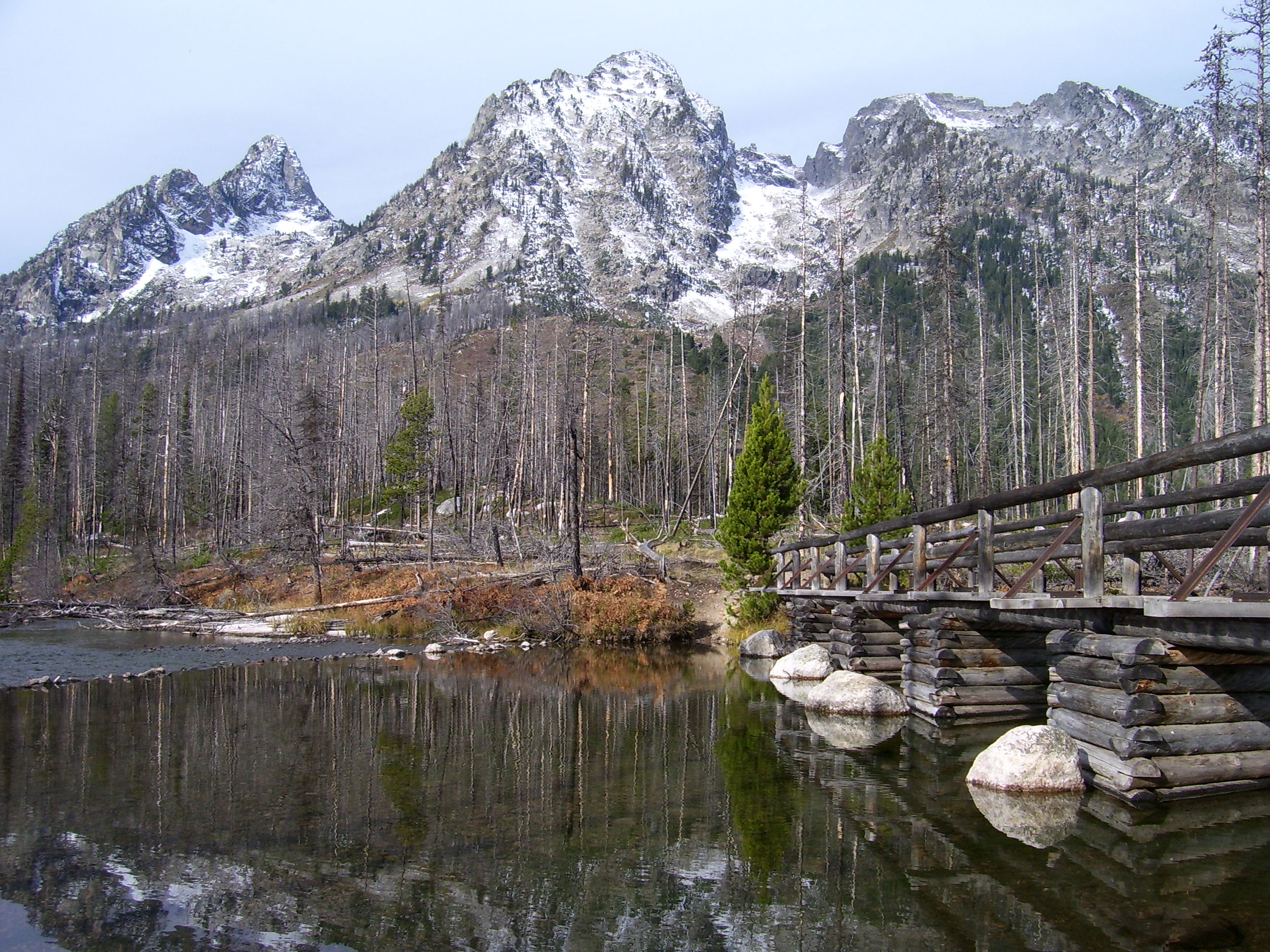
Footbridge across String Lake

- Garnet Canyon Trail begins at Lupine Meadows and ascends into Garnet Canyon. The trail becomes unmaintained after 4.2 miles (6.8 km) however from that point many climbers continue to the Lower Saddle between Middle and Grand Teton, from which most climbs to the summits of either peak is commenced.
- Granite Canyon Trail is 8.2 miles (13.2 km) long and begins at the Granite Canyon trailhead on the Moose-Wilson Road, about 2 miles (3.2 km) north of Teton Village and ends at the junction with the Teton Crest Trail near Marion Lake. The trail follows the length of Granite Canyon. Some hikers will use the aerial tram located at the Jackson Hole Mountain Resort and hike mostly downhill along the Rendezvous Mountain Trail and then the Granite Canyon Trail back to the resort, a total distance of 12.3 miles (19.8 km).
- Hermitage Point Trail is commenced from Colter Bay Village and involves a moderate hike of 9.7 miles (15.6 km) round trip to Hermitage Point on Jackson Lake.
- Heron Pond Swan Lake Trail is started from Colter Bay Village and is an easy 3-mile-long (4.8 km) nature hike to Heron Pond and Swan Lake.
- Jenny Lake Trail is a 7.1-mile (11.4 km) trail which circles Jenny Lake. This easy trail begins at the Jenny Lake campground or can be accessed at several other trailheads.
- Lake Solitude Trail extends from the forks of Cascade Canyon north to Lake Solitude and to Paintbrush Divide where it intercepts the Paintbrush Divide Trail. One of the most popular trails in the park and part of the 19-mile-long (31 km) loop hike which commences and terminates at the String Lake Trailhead.
- Leigh Lake Trail extends 4.6 miles (7.4 km) from the Leigh Lake Trailhead to Trapper Lake.
- Middle Fork Cut Off Trail is .7 mi (1.1 km) long and connects the Rendezvous Mountain Trail with the Teton Crest Trail.
- Open Canyon Trail is 8.3 miles (13.4 km) long and runs from the Valley Trail over Mount Hunt Divide and then descends into Granite Canyon. The trail traverses the entire length of Open Canyon.

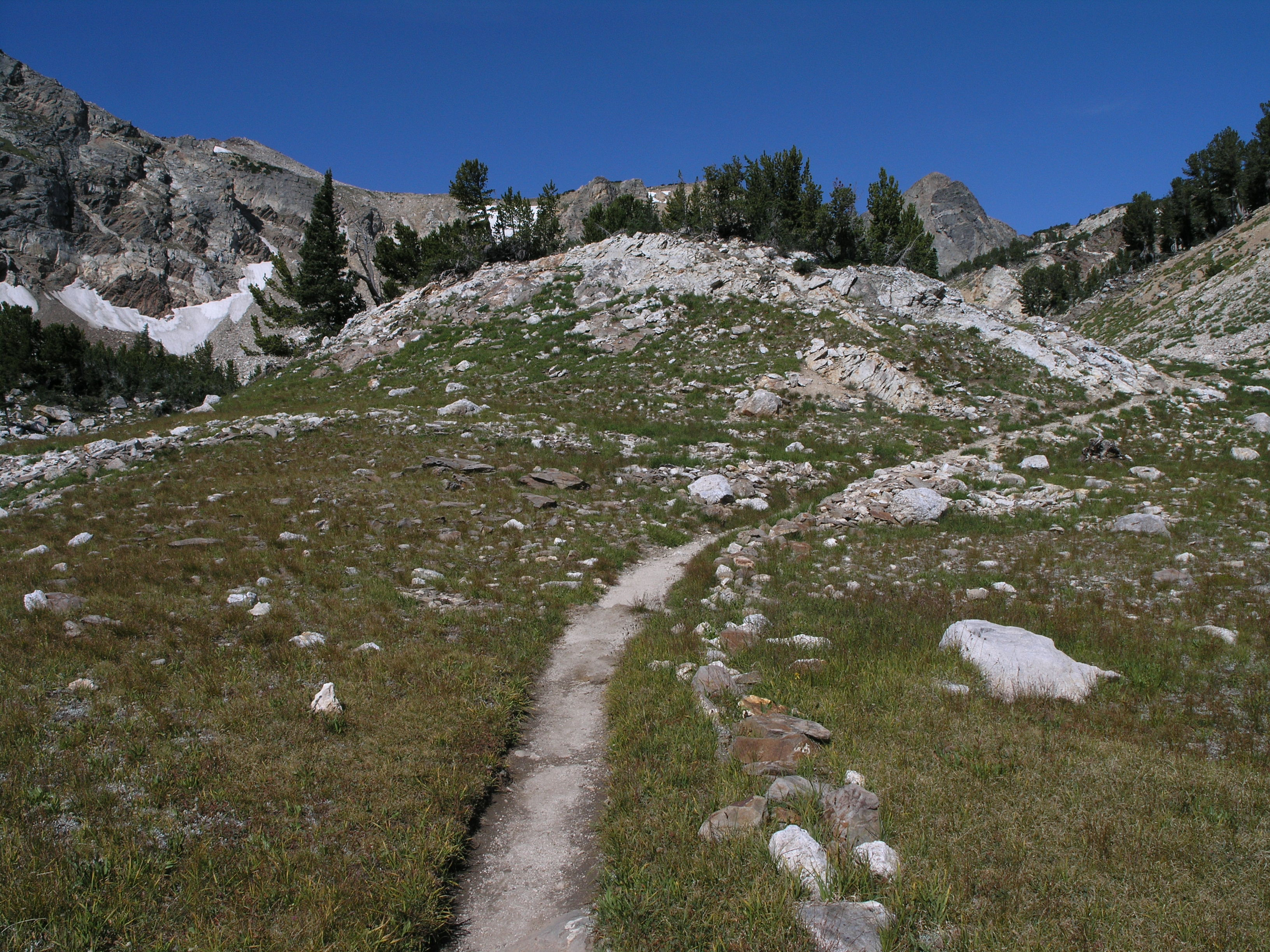
Paintbrush Divide Trail and the steep uphill climb to the divide

- Owl Creek Trail is 7.3 miles (11.7 km) long and located in the far northern region of the park. The trail begins at a junction on the Berry Creek Trail and traverses west then south to Moose Basin Divide where it meets the Webb Canyon Trail. Access to this trail is from the Glade Creek trailhead in the John D. Rockefeller, Jr. Memorial Parkway. The trails in this region may require dangerous stream crossings.
- Paintbrush Canyon Trail is commenced from the String Lake Trailhead and climbs over 4,000 feet (1,200 m) to Paintbrush Divide. There it intercepts the North Fork Cascade Canyon Trail. It passes Holly Lake and Lake Solitude.
- Rendezvous Mountain Trail is 4.8 miles (7.7 km) long. Most often used to descend from the top of Rendezvous Mountain after riding the Jackson Hole Mountain Resort aerial tram to the top of the peak, the trail intercepts the Granite Canyon Trail adjacent to the Upper Granite Canyon Patrol Cabin.
- Signal Mountain Trail is a moderate 6.8-mile-long (10.9 km) round-trip hike beginning at Signal Mountain Lodge and climbs to the top of Signal Mountain.
- South Fork Cascade Canyon Trail begins at the forks of Cascade Canyon and heads southwest to Hurricane Pass and is considered a strenuous hike. From the forks, the distance is 5.6 miles (9.0 km) to Hurricane Pass. A short connection trail leads to Schoolroom Glacier just before the top of the pass.
- String Lake Trail is a popular and easy 3.7-mile-long (6.0 km) round-trip trail which circles String Lake. The Paintbrush Canyon Trailhead also offers a non-motorized boat launch. Taking a short trip north with a 400M portage walk allows you to access Leigh Lake via a non-motorized boat.
- Taggart Lake Trail is an easy 3-mile-long (4.8 km) round-trip hike which provides access to Taggart Lake. The trail begins at the Taggert Lake Trailhead, located roughly 2.3 miles north of the Moose Entrance Station. The trail also allows you to connect to Bradley Lake.

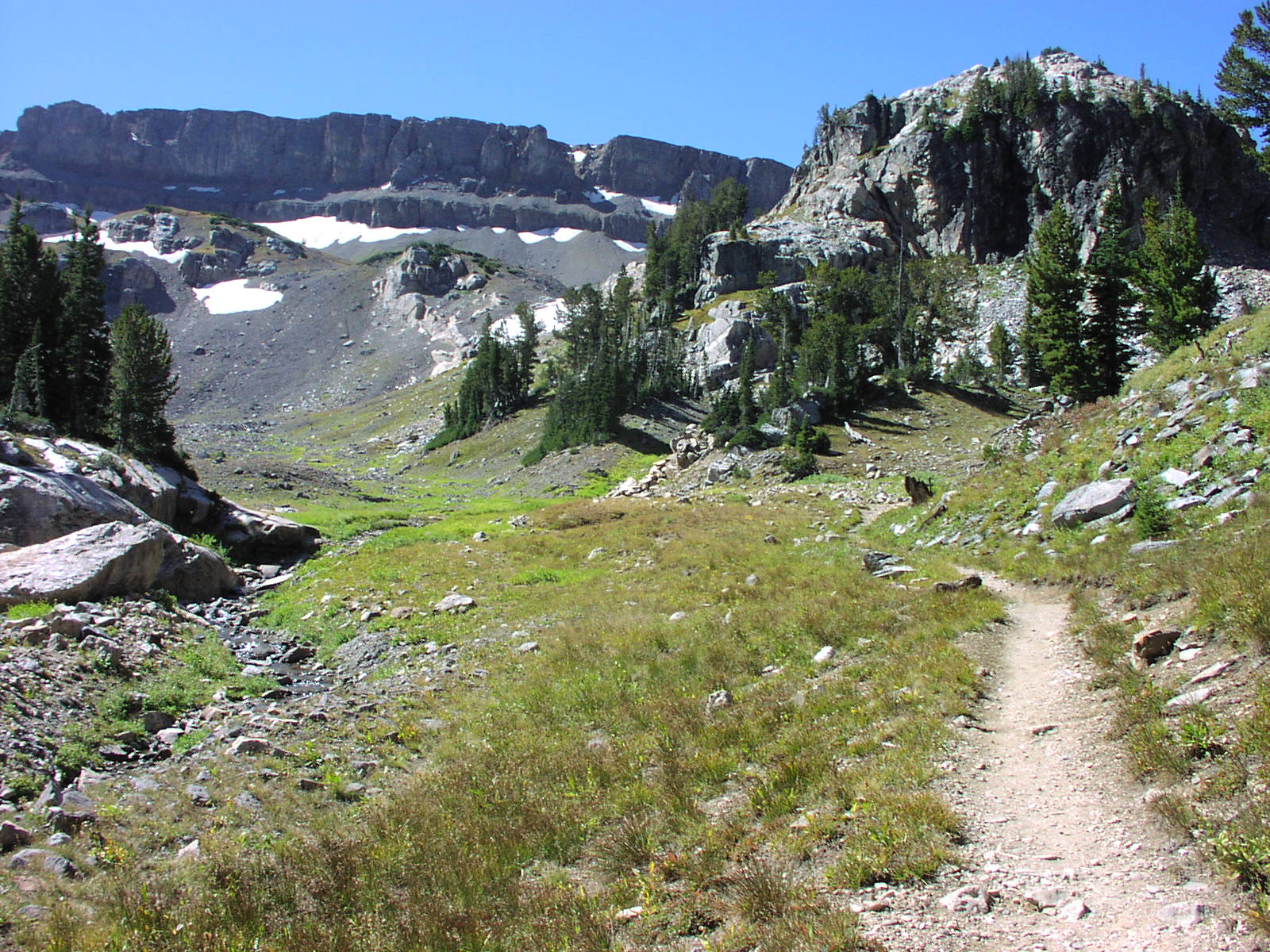
South Fork Cascade Canyon Trail

- Teton Crest Trail is 40 miles (64 km) long and extends from Phillips Pass on the border of Caribou-Targhee and Bridger-Teton National Forests to String Lake. The trail overlaps the South and North Cascade Canyon Trails and the Paintbrush Canyon Trail for almost half its length.
- Two Ocean Lake Trail is a moderate round-trip trail 6.4 miles (10.3 km) in length which circles Two Ocean Lake.
- Valley Trail extends 25 miles (40 km) from Trapper Lake south past the major lakes along the base of the Teton Range (excluding Jackson Lake) to the south park boundary near Teton Village. The trail is also known as the String Lake, Jenny Lake and Phelps Lake trails for part of its course.
- Webb Canyon Trail is 9.9 miles (15.9 km) long and in the far northern region of the park. The trail extends from near Wilcox Point on Jackson Lake and intercepts the Owl Creek Trail at Moose Basin Divide. Access to this trail is from the Glade Creek trailhead in the John D. Rockefeller, Jr. Memorial Parkway. The trails in this region may require dangerous stream crossings.
