= Cascade Canyon =

Canyon in Grand Teton National Park, US state of Wyoming

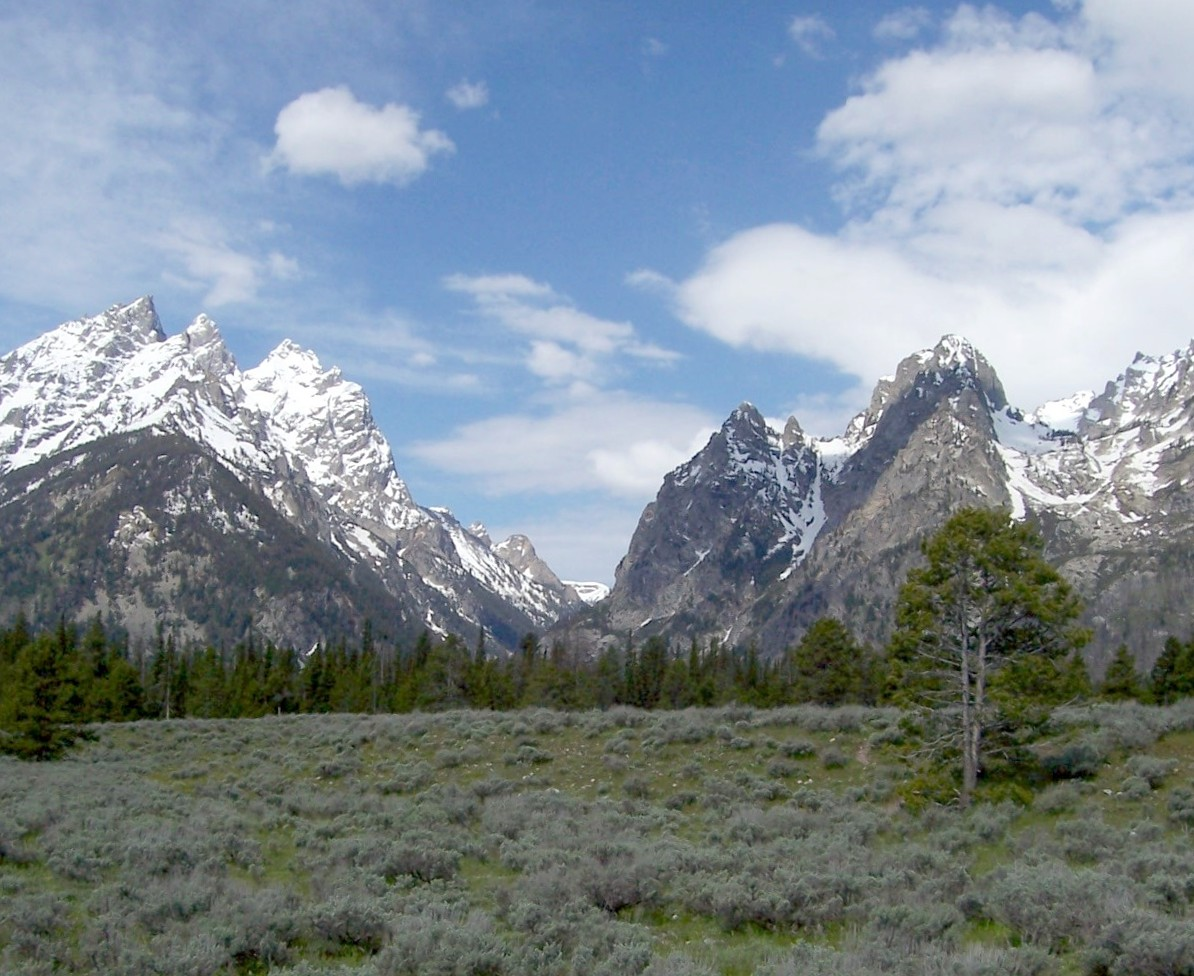
- Cascade Canyon with the Cathedral Group at left from Jackson Hole

Geography
- Country: United States
- State: Wyoming
- County: Teton
- Coordinates: 43.7636°N 110.73°W
- Lake: Lake Solitude
- Interactive map of Cascade Canyon

Cascade Canyon is located in Grand Teton National Park, in the U.S. state of Wyoming. The canyon was formed by glaciers which retreated at the end of the Last Glacial Maximum approximately 15,000 years ago. Today, Cascade Canyon has numerous polished glacial erratics, hanging cirques and a U-shape as evidences that demonstrate that glaciers once filled the canyon to a depth of at least 2,000 feet (610 m). Rock debris that was transported out of the canyon by glacial motion formed moraines which now impound the waters of Jenny Lake which is located at the base of the canyon. Cascade Creek now flows where the glaciers once did and the numerous waterfalls, such as the 100-foot (30 m) tall Hidden Falls, found within the gorge are popular destinations with tourists.

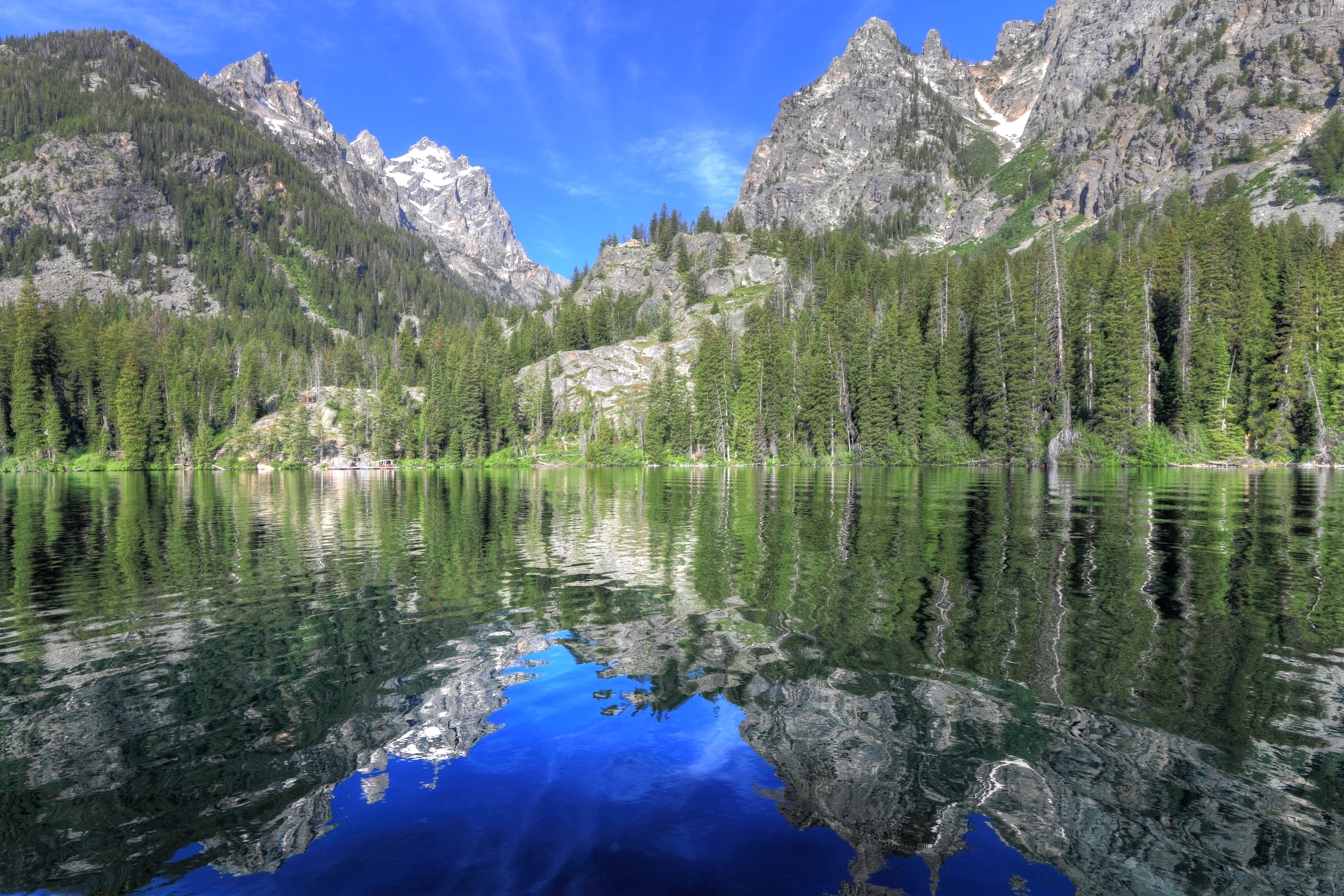
Cascade Canyon reflected off of Jenny Lake

The canyon is immediately west of Jenny Lake. The Cascade Canyon Trail follows the length of the canyon and is one of the most heavily used hiking trails in the park. The canyon can be reached from the Jenny Lake campground after a level hike of 1.8 miles (2.9 km) along the Jenny Lake Trail, or by way of a scenic boat ride from the campground to the west shore of Jenny Lake. At the foot of the canyon it is 4.5 miles (7.2 km) to the junction of the north and south Cascade Canyon trails. From there, hikers have the option of heading north along the Lake Solitude Trail to Lake Solitude (another 2.8 miles (4.5 km) or south via the South Fork Cascade Canyon Trail to Hurricane Pass (5.1 miles (8.2 km). From Lake Solitude there are sweeping views of the Cathedral Group and Grand Teton. Just below Hurricane Pass, a small glacier known as Schoolroom Glacier can be reached via a short side trail. The canyon is situated between Grand Teton which is 13,770 feet (4,200 m) high to the south and several peaks over 11,000 feet (3,400 m) to the north. Steep cliffs descending from these peaks ensure that the high points to the north and south are not visible until one hikes considerable distance into the canyon.

Five miles (8 km) west of Jenny Lake the Cascade Canyon Barn is preserved. Built in 1935 by members of the Civilian Conservation Corps, the barn was placed on the National Register of Historic Places in 1998.

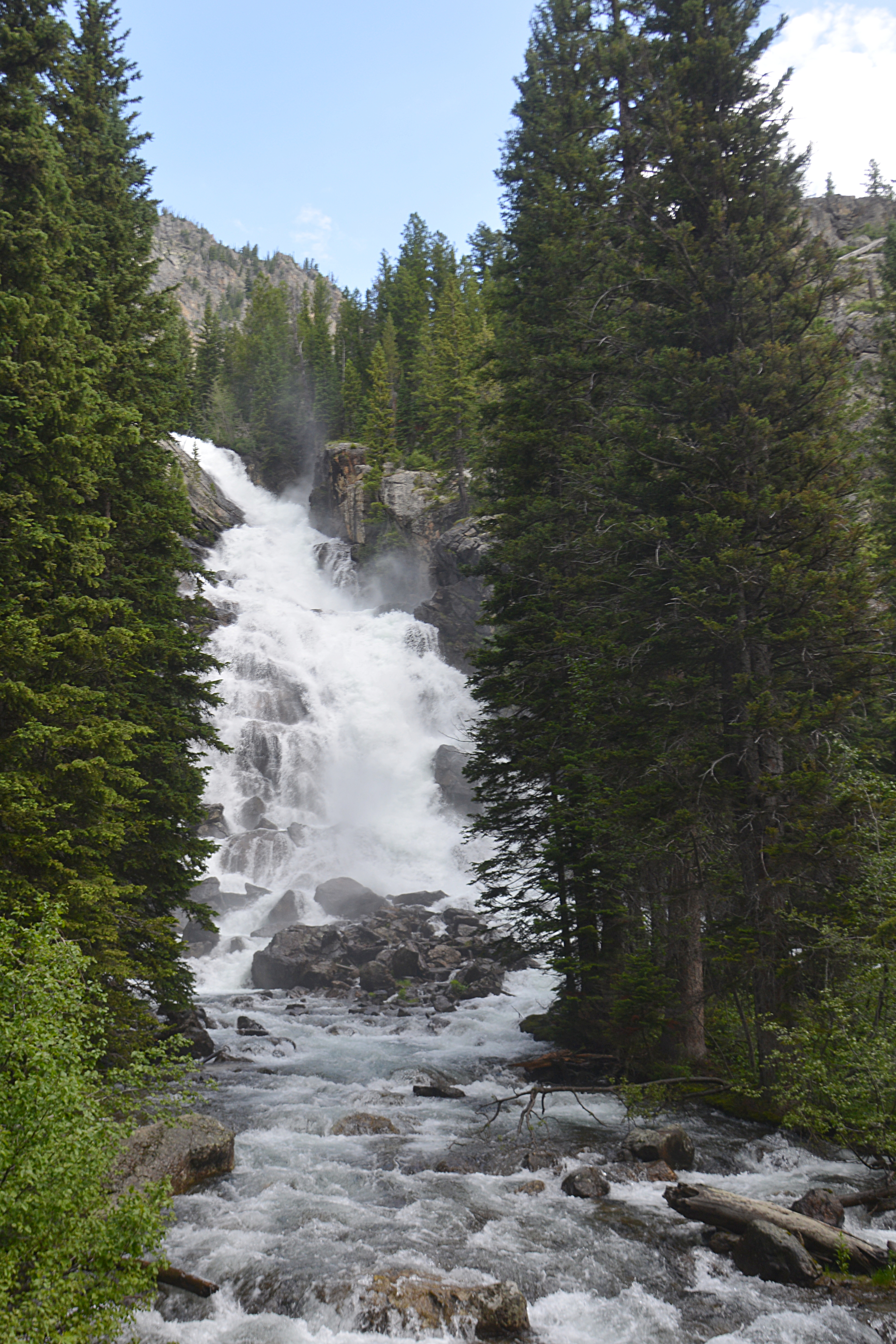
Hidden Falls

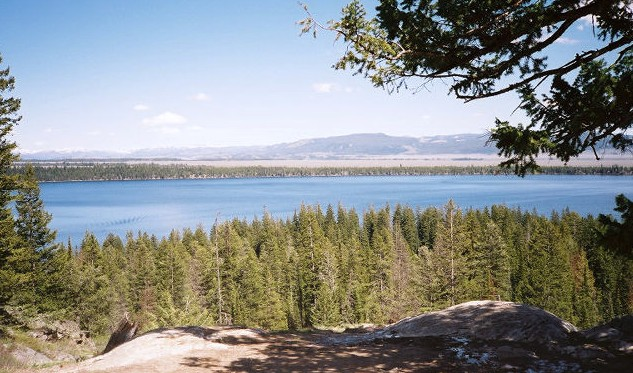
Jenny Lake from Inspiration Point

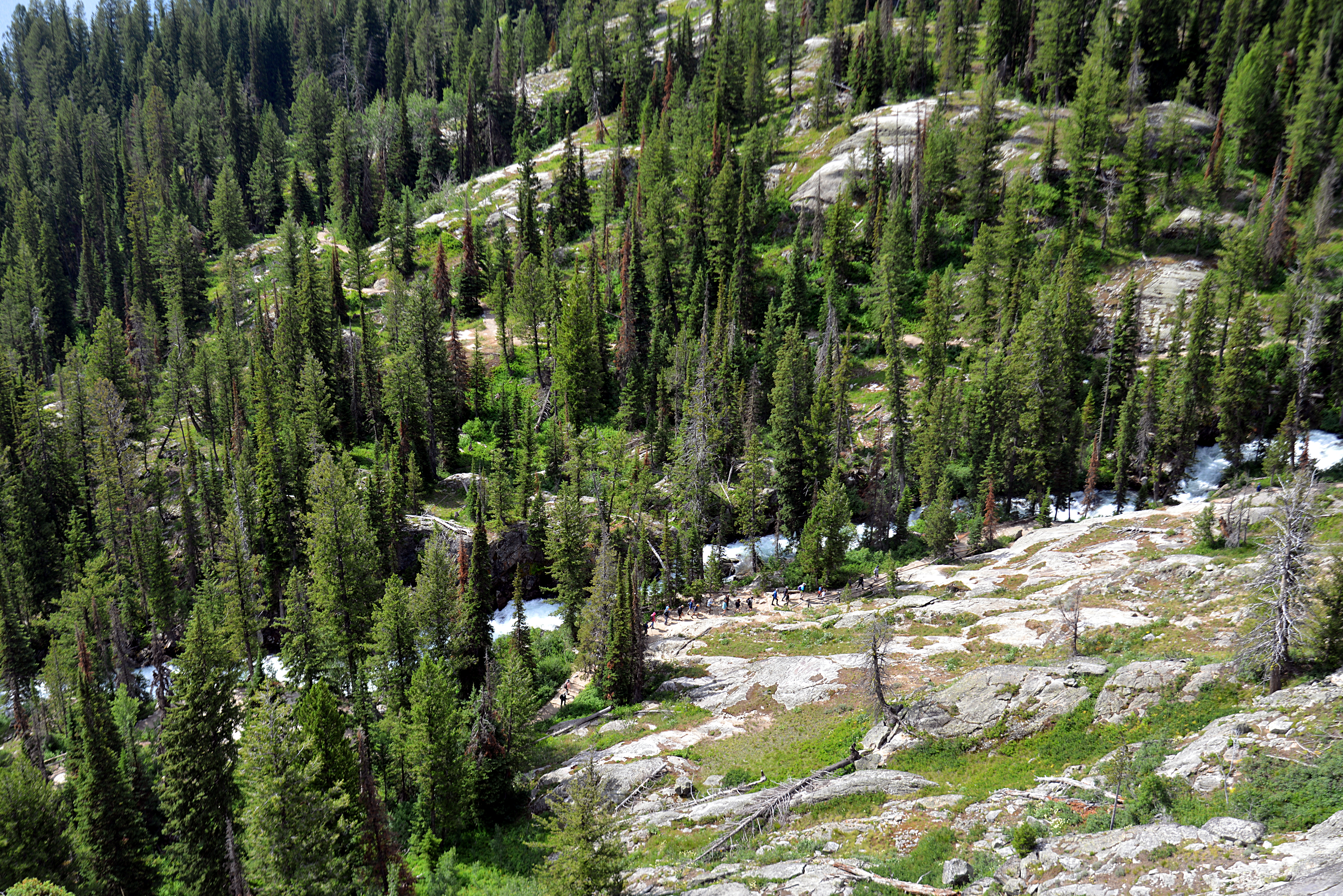
Looking down on Cascade Canyon

== See also ==
- Canyons of the Teton Range
- Geology of the Grand Teton area
