= Middle Fork Cut Off Trail =

Hiking trail in Grand Teton National Park, Wyoming

Coordinates: 43°36′02″N 110°54′56″W

- Length: .7 mi (1.1 km)
- Location: Teton Range
- Trailheads: Rendezvous Mountain Trail; Teton Crest Trail
- Use: Hiking
- Elevation change: Approximate gain of 300 ft (91 m)
- Highest point: Junction with Teton Crest Trail, 9,000 ft (2,700 m)
- Lowest point: Junction with Rendezvous Mountain Trail, 8,700 ft (2,700 m)
- Difficulty: Easy
- Season: Summer to Fall
- Sights: Teton Range
- Hazards: Severe weather

The Middle Fork Cut Off Trail is a .7 mi (1.1 km) long hiking trail in Grand Teton National Park in the U.S. state of Wyoming. The trail connects the Rendezvous Mountain Trail with the Teton Crest Trail. It is the route taken by those who use the Jackson Hole Mountain Resort ski lift to the top of Rendezvous Mountain to hike to Marion Lake, a roundtrip distance of 11.8 mi (19.0 km).

== See also ==
- List of hiking trails in Grand Teton National Park
