= Taggart Lake Trail =

Hiking trail in Wyoming, United States

Coordinates: 43°42′03″N 110°44′33″W

- Length: 3 mi (4.8 km)
- Location: Jackson Hole; Teton Range
- Trailheads: Taggart Lake trailhead
- Use: Hiking
- Elevation change: Approximate gain of 400 ft (120 m)
- Highest point: Along trail, 6,950 ft (2,120 m)
- Lowest point: Taggart Lake trailhead, 6,625 ft (2,019 m)
- Difficulty: Easy
- Season: Spring to Fall
- Sights: Teton Range; Taggart Lake
- Hazards: Severe weather

The Taggart Lake Trail is a 3-mile (4.8 km) long round-trip hiking trail in Grand Teton National Park in the U.S. state of Wyoming. The trail is accessed from the Taggart Lake trailhead and provides access to Taggart Lake, with views of the lake and the Teton Range. At Taggart Lake, the trail intercepts the Valley Trail which heads north towards Bradley Lake or south to Death Canyon. Using the Valley Trail and the Bradley Lake Trail, a loop hike starting from the Taggart Lake Trailhead is 5.9 mi (9.5 km) long.

== See also ==
- List of hiking trails in Grand Teton National Park
