= Valley Trail (Grand Teton National Park) =

40-mile mountainous hiking trail in Wyoming

Coordinates: 43°43′22″N 110°45′33″W

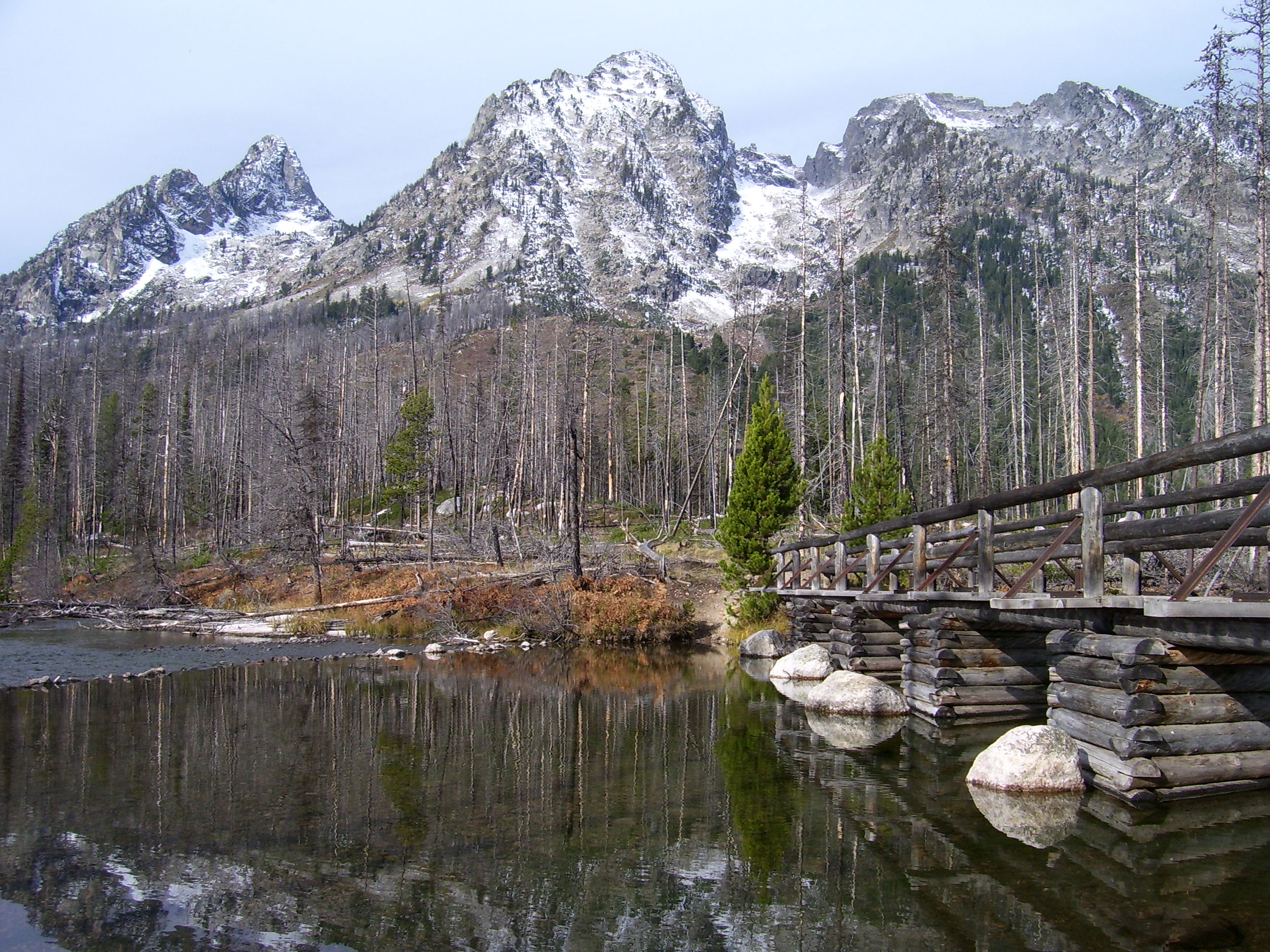
- The Valley Trail crosses a footbridge at String Lake
- Length: 40 mi (64 km)
- Location: Jackson Hole
- Trailheads: Teton Village
- Use: Hiking
- Elevation change: Approximate gain of 1,100 ft (340 m)
- Highest point: Near Phelps Lake, 7,400 ft (2,300 m)
- Lowest point: Teton Village, 6,300 ft (1,900 m)
- Difficulty: Moderate-Strenuous
- Season: Spring to Fall
- Sights: Teton Range; Numerous Lakes
- Hazards: Severe weather

The Valley Trail is a 40-mile (64 km) long hiking trail in Grand Teton National Park in the U.S. state of Wyoming. Though the trail can be accessed at numerous trailheads in Grand Teton National Park, the southern terminus is near Teton Village, Wyoming, just outside the park. Heading north from Teton Village, the Valley Trail flanks the base of the Teton Range and skirts the shores of Phelps, Taggart, Bradley, Jenny, String, Leigh, Bearpaw and Trapper Lakes. Along its 40-mile (64 km) length, it is sometimes known by other names such as the Jenny Lake Trail or the String Lake Trail.

== See also ==
List of hiking trails in Grand Teton National Park
