= Survey Peak =

Mountain in the state of Wyoming

- Location within Wyoming Location within the United States

Highest point
- Elevation: 9,281 ft (2,829 m)
- Prominence: 837 ft (255 m)
- Coordinates: 44°02′25″N 110°51′01″W

Geography
- Location: Grand Teton National Park, Caribou-Targhee National Forest, Teton County, Wyoming, U.S.
- Parent range: Teton Range
- Topo map: USGS Survey Peak

Survey Peak (9,281 feet (2,829 m)) is located in the northern Teton Range in the U.S. state of Wyoming. The peak is on the border of Grand Teton National Park and the Jedediah Smith Wilderness of Caribou-Targhee National Forest. Survey Peak rises to the immediate north of Berry Creek and can be accessed via the Berry Creek Trail.
