= Paintbrush Canyon Trail =

Hiking trail in the American state of Wyoming

Coordinates: 43°48′13″N 110°44′43″W

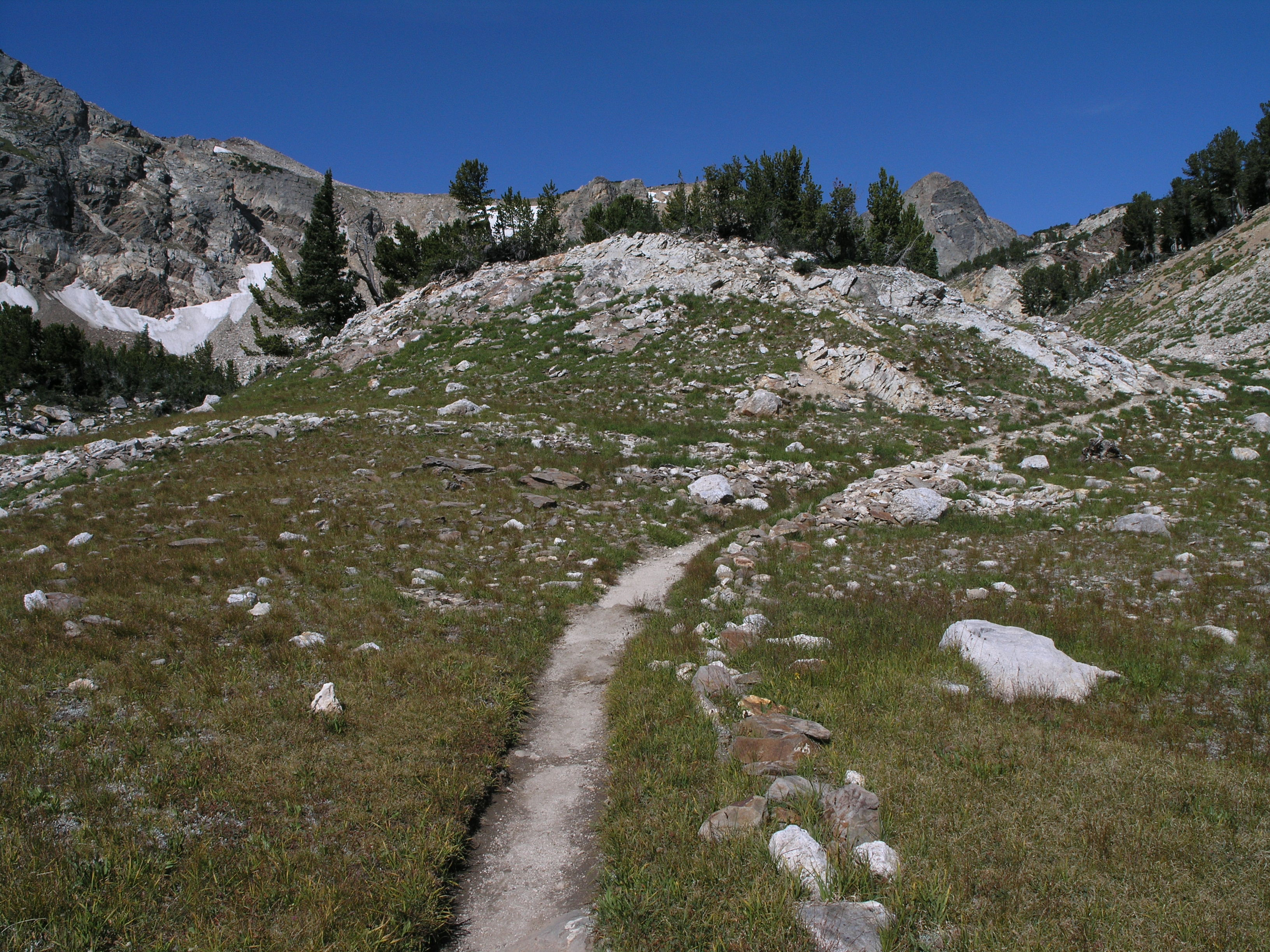
- Paintbrush Canyon Trail near Holly Lake
- Length: 9.1 mi (14.6 km)
- Location: Teton Range
- Trailheads: String Lake Trailhead
- Use: Hiking
- Elevation change: Approximate gain of 3,840 ft (1,170 m)
- Highest point: Paintbrush Divide, 10,720 ft (3,270 m)
- Lowest point: String Lake Trailhead, 6,880 ft (2,100 m)
- Difficulty: Strenuous
- Season: Summer to Fall
- Sights: Teton Range
- Hazards: Severe weather Snowpack

The Paintbrush Canyon Trail is a 9.1-mile (14.6 km) long hiking trail in Grand Teton National Park in the U.S. state of Wyoming. Access to the Paintbrush Canyon Trail is from the String Lake trailhead. From there the trail follows the west shore of String Lake and is also known as the String Lake Trail. The Paintbrush Canyon Trail then enters Paintbrush Canyon and becomes steeper and then splits with one trail heading to Holly Lake and the other heading south then west. The trails merge west of Holly Lake and it is a steady altitude gain the last 3.9 miles (6.3 km) to Paintbrush Divide. The east approach to Paintbrush Divide is steep and may require the use of an ice axe through July. There are two camping zones within Paintbrush Canyon and one designated campsite at Holly Lake which are available with a permit. There is a popular loop trail which includes the Paintbrush Canyon Trail, Lake Solitude Trail and Cascade Canyon Trail which spans a distance of 19 mi (31 km) and has a total elevation gain of 4,900 ft (1,500 m).

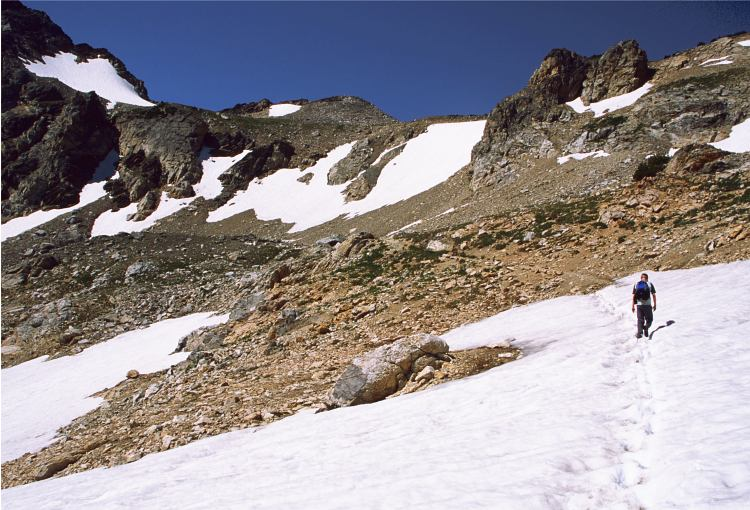
Hiker crosses snowfield en route to Paintbrush Divide.

== See also ==
List of hiking trails in Grand Teton National Park
