= Garnet Canyon Trail =

Hiking trail in Wyoming, United States

Coordinates: 43°43′33″N 110°47′45″W

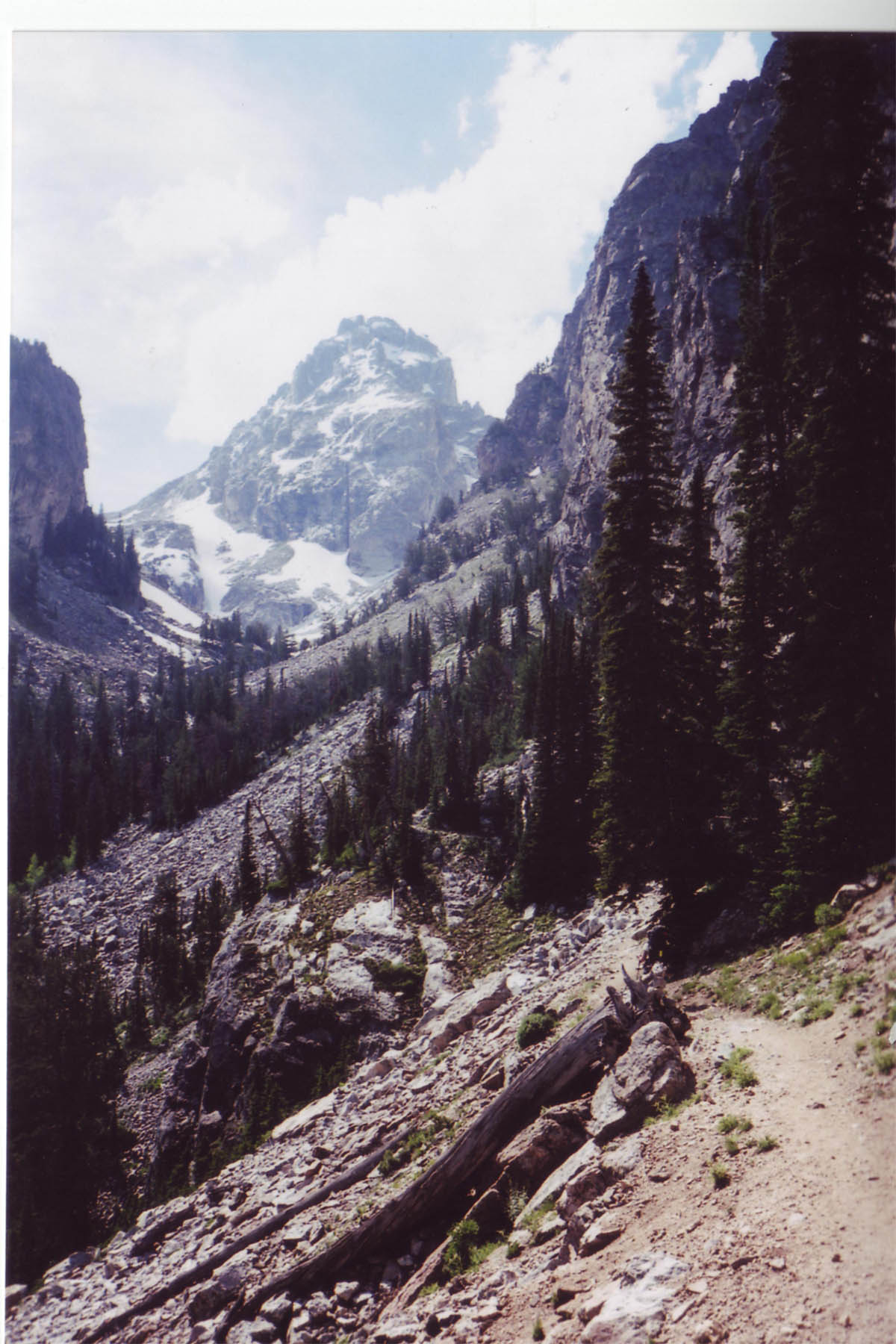
- Middle Teton from the Garnet Canyon Trail
- Length: 4.8 mi (7.7 km)
- Location: Teton Range
- Trailheads: Lupine Meadows
- Use: Hiking
- Elevation change: Approximate gain of 2,650 ft (810 m)
- Highest point: Garnet Canyon, 9,500 ft (2,900 m)
- Lowest point: Lupine Meadows, 6,732 ft (2,052 m)
- Difficulty: Strenuous
- Season: Summer to Fall
- Sights: Teton Range
- Hazards: Severe weather

The Garnet Canyon Trail is a 4.8-mile (7.7 km) (8.4 mi (13.5 km) round-trip) long hiking trail in Grand Teton National Park in the U.S. state of Wyoming. The trailhead is at the Lupine Meadows parking area and climbs steeply more than 2,500 feet (760 m) in just under 5 miles (8.0 km) into Garnet Canyon. At the 2-mile (3.2 km) point, the trail forks from the Amphitheater Lake Trail and heads south and then west into Garnet Canyon. Garnet Canyon is the most popular approach route for climbers attempting to summit not only Grand Teton but also Middle Teton, South Teton, Teepe Pillar and Disappointment Peak. Though the trail becomes unmaintained once it enters boulder fields at approximately the 9,500-foot (2,900 m) elevation point, climbers continue on to other destinations such as the Lower Saddle (11,600 ft (3,500 m)), a high altitude mountain pass situated between Middle and Grand Teton. The altitude gain from the Lupine Meadows trailhead to the Lower Saddle is nearly 5,000 feet (1,500 m).

== See also ==
List of hiking trails in Grand Teton National Park
