= Jackass Pass (Teton County, Wyoming) =

- Location within Wyoming
- Elevation: 8,501 ft (2,591 m)
- Traversed by: Berry Creek Trail

Third Approach
- Location: Teton County, Wyoming, United States
- Range: Teton Range, Rocky Mountains
- Coordinates: 44°01′42″N 110°52′23″W
- Topo map: USGS Survey Peak, WY

Jackass Pass is a pedestrian mountain pass located in the Teton Range and on the border of Grand Teton National Park and Bridger-Teton National Forest in the U.S. state of Wyoming. Access to Jackass Pass from Grand Teton National Park involves a 6.7 mi (10.8 km) hike up the Berry Creek Trail or even greater distances if coming from the National Forest side.
