= Leigh Lake Trail =

Hiking trail in Grand Teton National Park

Coordinates: 43°48′57″N 110°45′15″W

- Length: 5 mi (8.0 km)
- Location: Teton Range; Jackson Hole
- Trailheads: Leigh Lake Trailhead
- Use: Hiking
- Elevation change: Approximate gain of 250 ft (76 m)
- Highest point: Trapper Lake, 7,030 ft (2,140 m)
- Lowest point: Leigh Lake Trailhead, 6,880 ft (2,100 m)
- Difficulty: Easy
- Season: Late Spring to Fall
- Sights: Teton Range
- Hazards: Severe weather

The Leigh Lake Trail is a five-mile-long (8 km) hiking trail in Grand Teton National Park in the U.S. state of Wyoming. For its entire length it is also part of the Valley Trail. The trail starts at the Leigh Lake trailhead and follows the eastern shores of String and Leigh Lakes and extends to Trapper Lake. The Leigh Lake trailhead is off the one-way road from North Jenny Lake Junction. The trail provides access to a half dozen camping sites on Leigh, Bearpaw and Trapper Lakes.

== See also ==
1. List of hiking trails in Grand Teton National Park
