= Granite Canyon Trail =

Hiking trail in Grand Teton National Park in the U.S. state of Wyoming

Coordinates: 43°36′57″N 110°49′39″W

- Length: 8.2 mi (13.2 km)
- Location: Teton Range
- Trailheads: Granite Canyon Trailhead; Teton Crest Trail
- Use: Hiking
- Elevation change: Approximate gain of 2,600 ft (790 m)
- Highest point: Junction with Teton Crest Trail, 9,000 ft (2,700 m)
- Lowest point: Granite Canyon Trailhead, 6,378 ft (1,944 m)
- Difficulty: Moderate to Strenuous
- Season: Summer to Fall
- Sights: Teton Range
- Hazards: Severe weather

The Granite Canyon Trail is a 8.2 mi (13.2 km) long hiking trail in Grand Teton National Park in the U.S. state of Wyoming. The trail begins at the Granite Canyon trailhead on the Moose-Wilson Road, about 2 miles (3.2 km) north of Teton Village and ends at the junction with the Teton Crest Trail near Marion Lake. The trail follows the length of Granite Canyon. Just over a mile before the junction with the Teton Crest Trail, the Open Canyon Trail intercepts this trail from the north. An alternative route is to take the Jackson Hole Mountain Resort ski lift to the top of Rendezvous Mountain and descend 3 mi (4.8 km) down the Rendezvous Mountain Trail to junction with the Granite Canyon Trail, a distance of 12 mi (19 km) and mostly downhill. There are three different camping zones in the canyon which are available by permit.

== See also ==
List of hiking trails in Grand Teton National Park
