= Lake Solitude Trail =

Wyoming hiking trail

Coordinates: 43°46′48″N 110°49′41″W

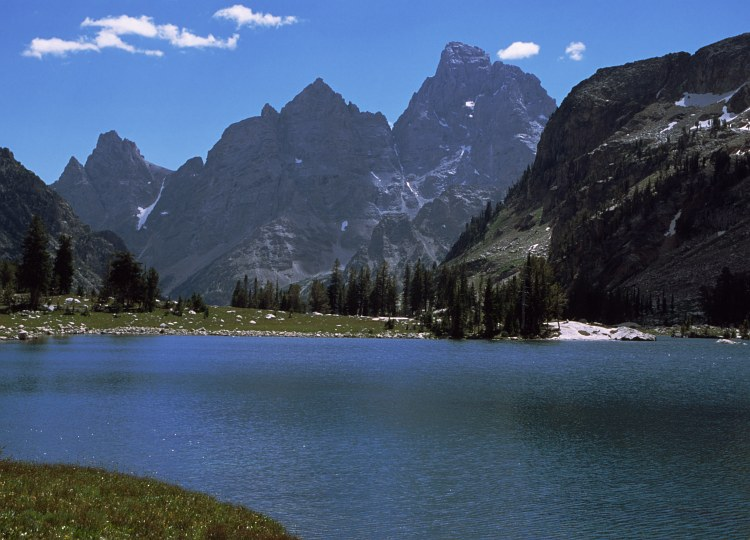
- From the Lake Solitude Trail, Lake Solitude in foreground with Teewinot Mountain, Mount Owen and Grand Teton, left to right
- Length: 4.8 mi (7.7 km) (round-trip)
- Location: Teton Range
- Trailheads: Forks of Cascade Canyon
- Use: Hiking
- Elevation change: Approximate gain of 2,600 ft (790 m)
- Highest point: Paintbrush Divide, 10,720 ft (3,270 m)
- Lowest point: Forks of Cascade Canyon, 8,100 ft (2,500 m)
- Difficulty: Strenuous
- Season: Summer to Fall
- Sights: Teton Range
- Hazards: Severe weather, Snowpack

The Lake Solitude Trail is a 4.8-mile (7.7 km) long hiking trail in Grand Teton National Park in the U.S. state of Wyoming. The trail begins at the Forks of Cascade Canyon and follows Cascade Creek up through North Cascade Canyon to Lake Solitude. Beyond Lake Solitude, the trail becomes steep and climbs to Paintbrush Divide where it ends at the Paintbrush Canyon Trail. The only way to access the trail is by way of either the Paintbrush Canyon or Cascade Canyon Trails. Except at and above Lake Solitude, backcountry camping is allowed with a permit along the trail. At South Jenny Lake, a boat shuttle operates during the summer which shortens the hike by 4 miles (6.4 km). The Lake Solitude Trail is part of a popular 19-mile (31 km) long loop hike which runs through both Cascade and Paintbrush Canyons.

== See also ==
- List of hiking trails in Grand Teton National Park
