= Hermitage Point Trail =

Hiking trail in Wyoming, United States

Coordinates: 43°52′48″N 110°38′08″W

- Length: 9.7 mi (15.6 km)
- Location: Jackson Hole
- Trailheads: Colter Bay
- Use: Hiking
- Elevation change: Approximate gain of 100 ft (30 m)
- Highest point: Along trail, 6,900 ft (2,100 m)
- Lowest point: Colter Bay, 6,775 ft (2,065 m)
- Difficulty: Easy-Moderate
- Season: Late Spring to Fall
- Sights: Teton Range; Jackson Lake
- Hazards: Severe weather

The Hermitage Point Trail is a hiking trail in Grand Teton National Park in the U.S. state of Wyoming. The trailhead is at the Colter Bay Village parking area and provides a loop totalling 9.7 miles (15.6 km) to Hermitage Point and back along the shores of Jackson Lake. The trail passes by several wetland areas as well as Heron Pond and Swan Lake. There are no camping areas on the trail.

== See also ==
List of hiking trails in Grand Teton National Park
