= Cascade Canyon Trail =

Hiking trail in Grand Teton National Park, Wyoming

Coordinates: 43°45′49″N 110°45′50″W

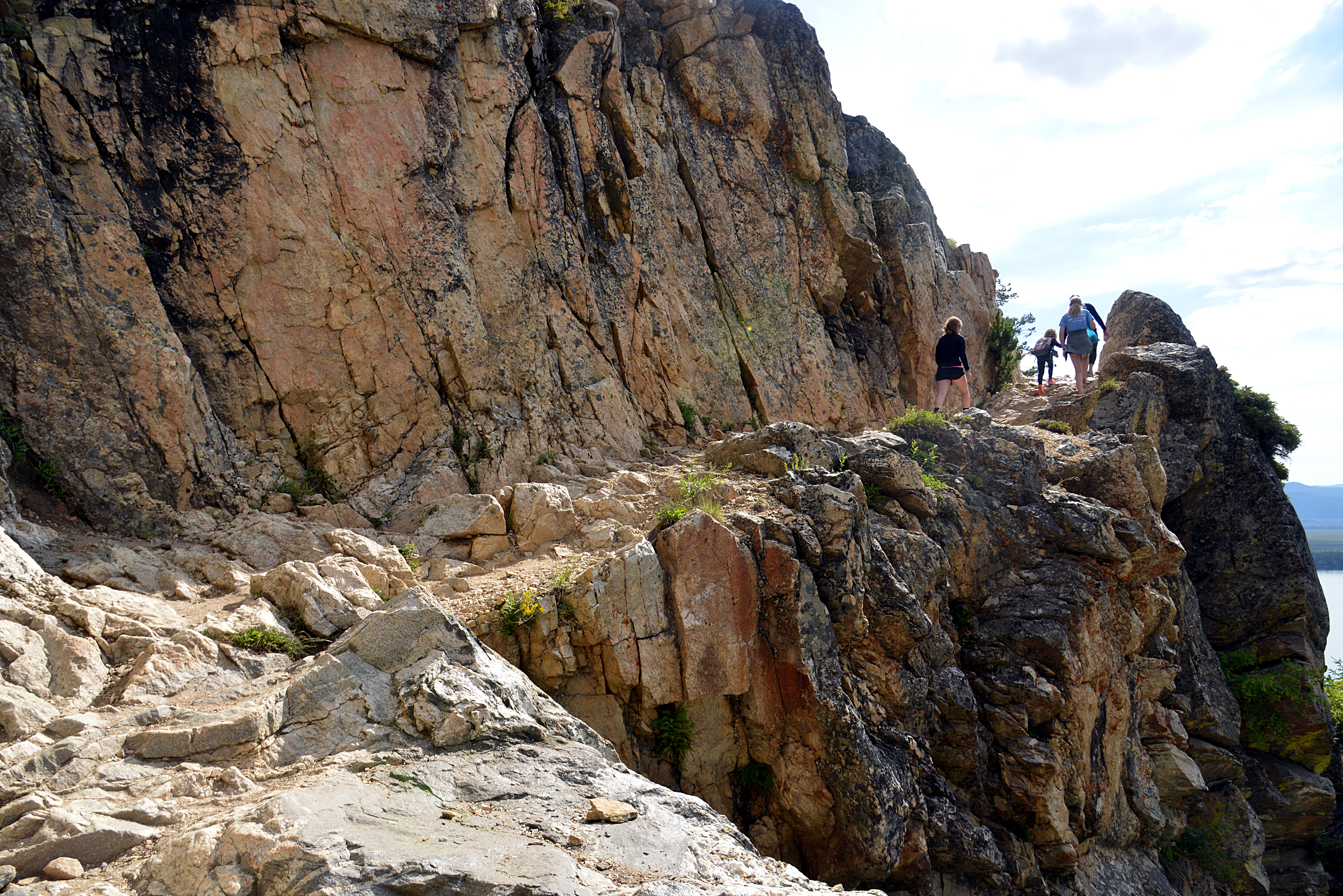
- Length: 13.6 mi (21.9 km) (round-trip)
- Location: Teton Range
- Trailheads: South Jenny Lake
- Use: Hiking
- Elevation change: Approximate gain of 1,300 ft (400 m)
- Highest point: Forks of Cascade Canyon, 8,100 ft (2,500 m)
- Lowest point: Jenny Lake, 6,798 ft (2,072 m)
- Difficulty: Moderate-Strenuous
- Season: Late Spring to Fall
- Sights: Teton Range
- Hazards: Severe weather

The Cascade Canyon Trail is a 13.6-mile (21.9 km) round-trip long hiking trail in Grand Teton National Park in the U.S. state of Wyoming.

== Description ==
The trailhead is at the South Jenny Lake parking area and follows the Jenny Lake Trail around the south shore of Jenny Lake to the Forks of Cascade Canyon. The trail passes near Hidden Falls after almost 3 miles (4.8 km) then goes west into the heart of Cascade Canyon, flanked by Teewinot Mountain and Mount Owen to the south and The Jaw and Rock of Ages to the north. At the Forks of Cascade Canyon, the trail splits with the Lake Solitude Trail heading to Lake Solitude and Paintbrush Divide, while the South Fork Cascade Canyon Trail leads to Hurricane Pass. There are no camping areas along the trail though not far from the Forks, camping zones exist to the north and south. At South Jenny Lake, a boat shuttle operates during the summer which shortens the hike by 4 miles (6.4 km).

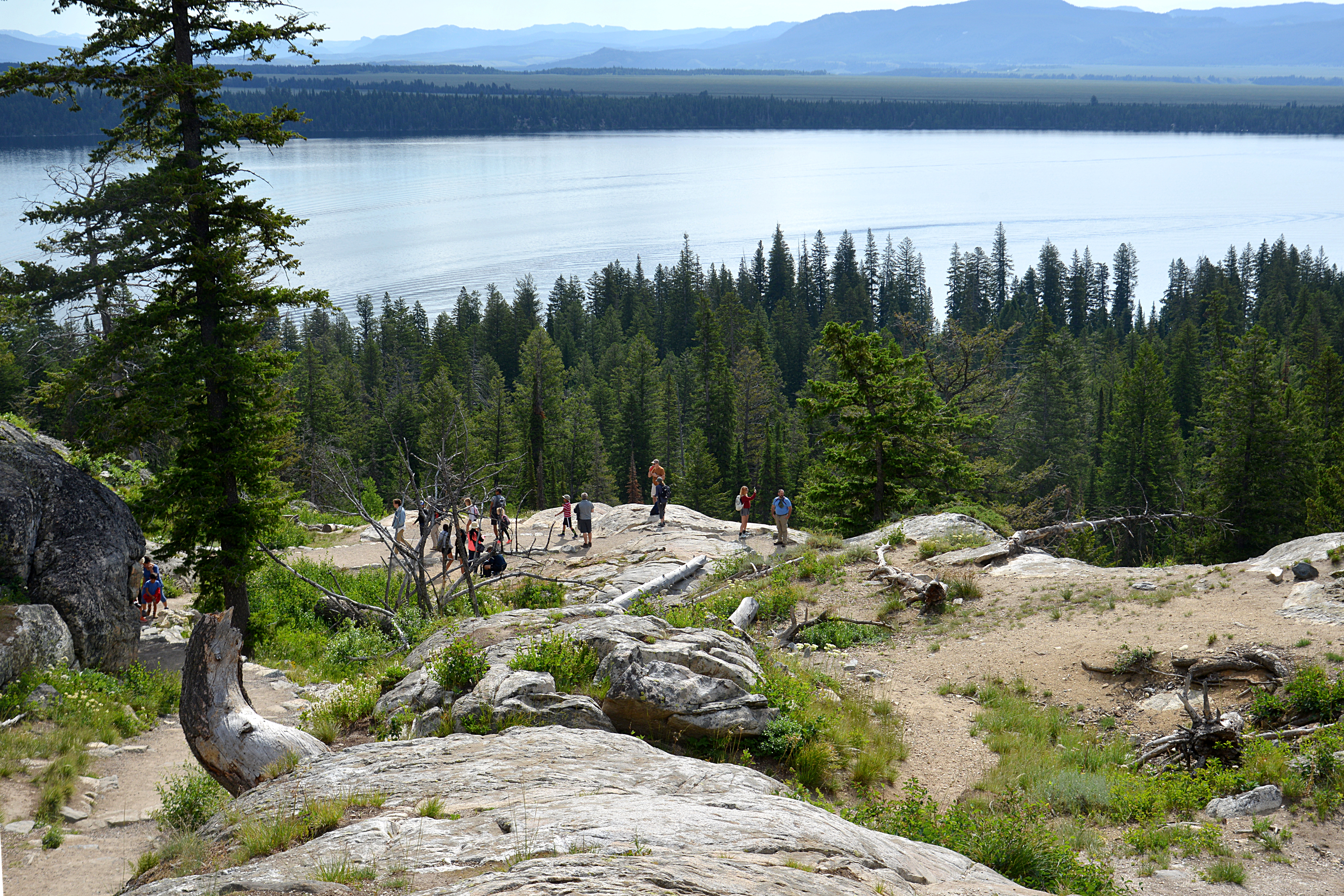
Cascade Canyon trail overlook

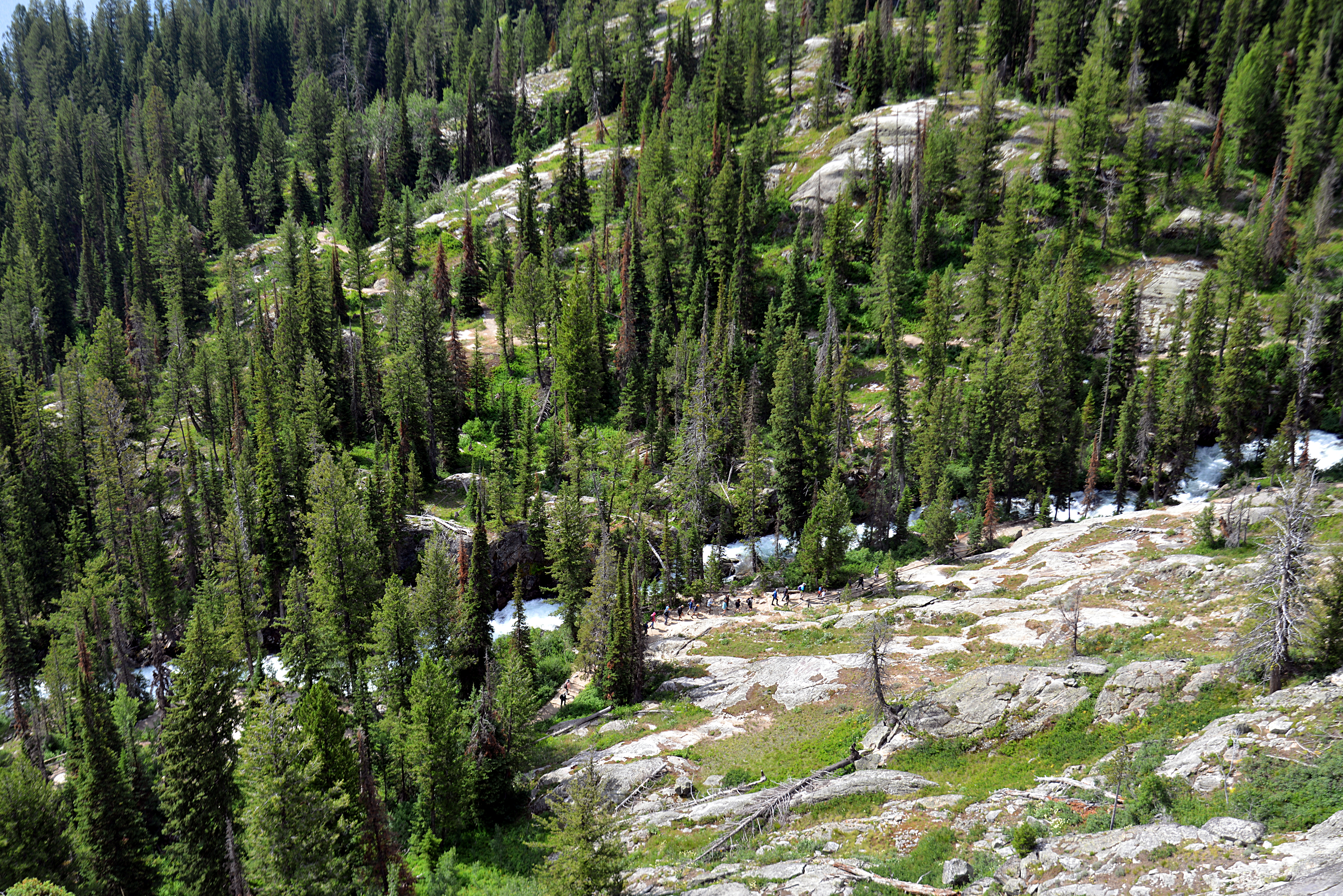
Looking down on the Cascade Canyon trail and Cascade Creek

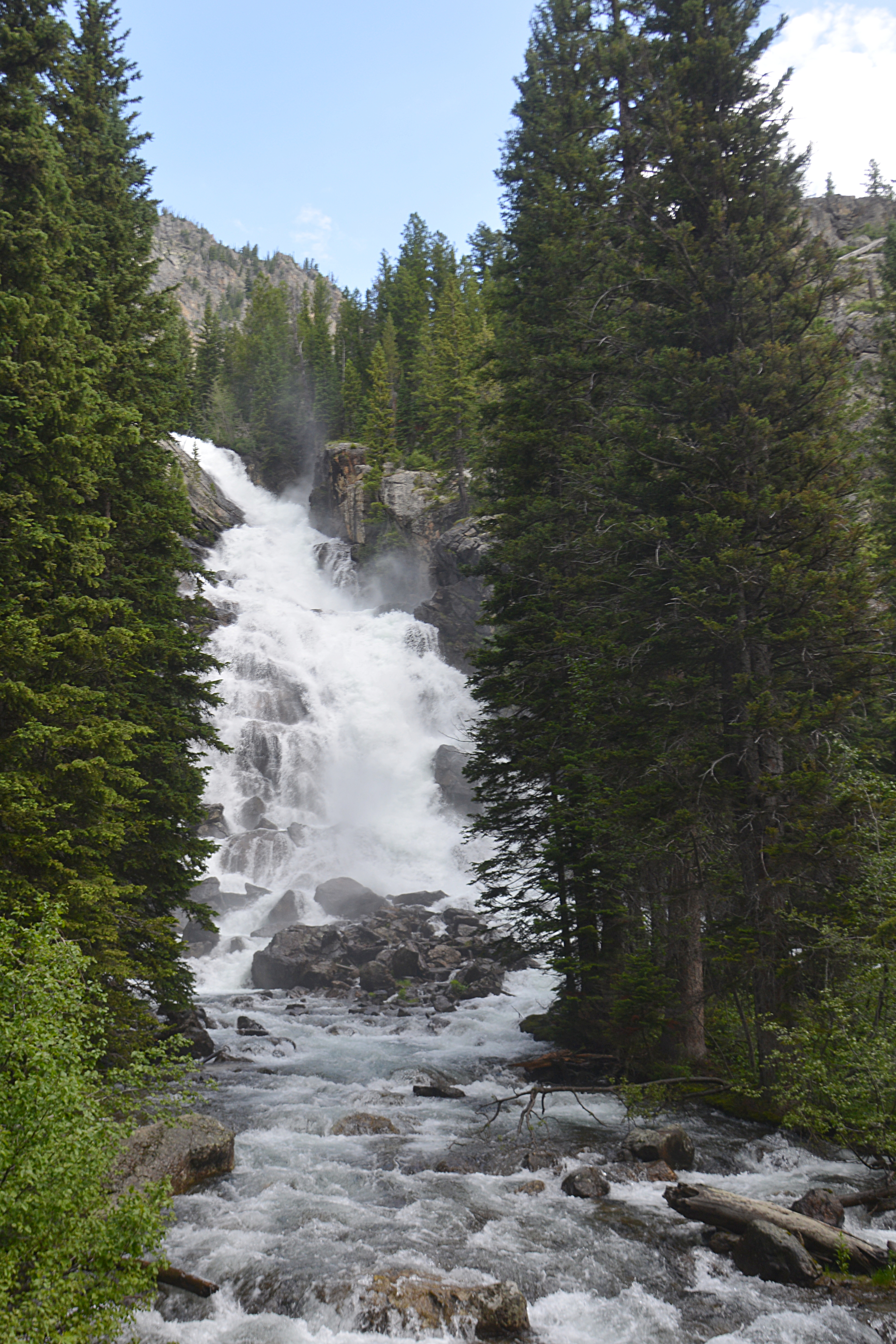
Hidden Falls

== See also ==
- List of hiking trails in Grand Teton National Park
