= Amphitheater Lake Trail =

Hiking trail in Grand Teton National Park, Wyoming, USA

Coordinates: 43°43′39″N 110°45′58″W

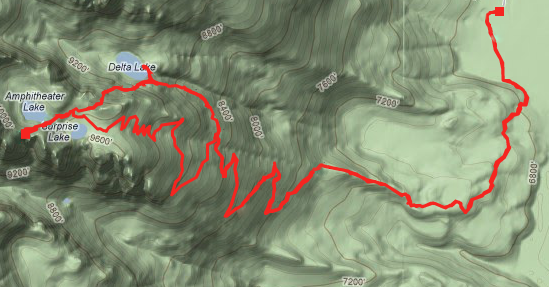
- Map of the trail
- Length: 5 mi (8.0 km)
- Location: Teton Range
- Trailheads: Lupine Meadows
- Use: Hiking
- Elevation change: Approximate gain of 3,150 ft (960 m)
- Highest point: Amphitheater Lake, 9,698 ft (2,956 m)
- Lowest point: Lupine Meadows, 6,732 ft (2,052 m)
- Difficulty: Strenuous
- Season: Summer to Fall
- Sights: Teton Range
- Hazards: Severe weather

The Amphitheater Lake Trail is a 5-mile (8.0 km) long hiking trail in Grand Teton National Park in the U.S. state of Wyoming. The trailhead is at the Lupine Meadows parking area and climbs steeply more than 3,000 feet (910 m) in just over 5 miles (8.0 km) to Amphitheater Lake. At the 2-mile (3.2 km) point, the trail forks and the Garnet Canyon Trail heads south and then west into Garnet Canyon. Shortly before arriving at Amphitheater Lake, hikers pass Surprise Lake where there is a backcountry camping site available if one obtains a free permit. Amphitheater Lake is southwest of Disappointment Peak.

== See also ==
List of hiking trails in Grand Teton National Park
