= String Lake Trail =

Hiking trail in Grand Teton National Park, Wyoming

Coordinates: 43°47′20″N 110°44′13″W

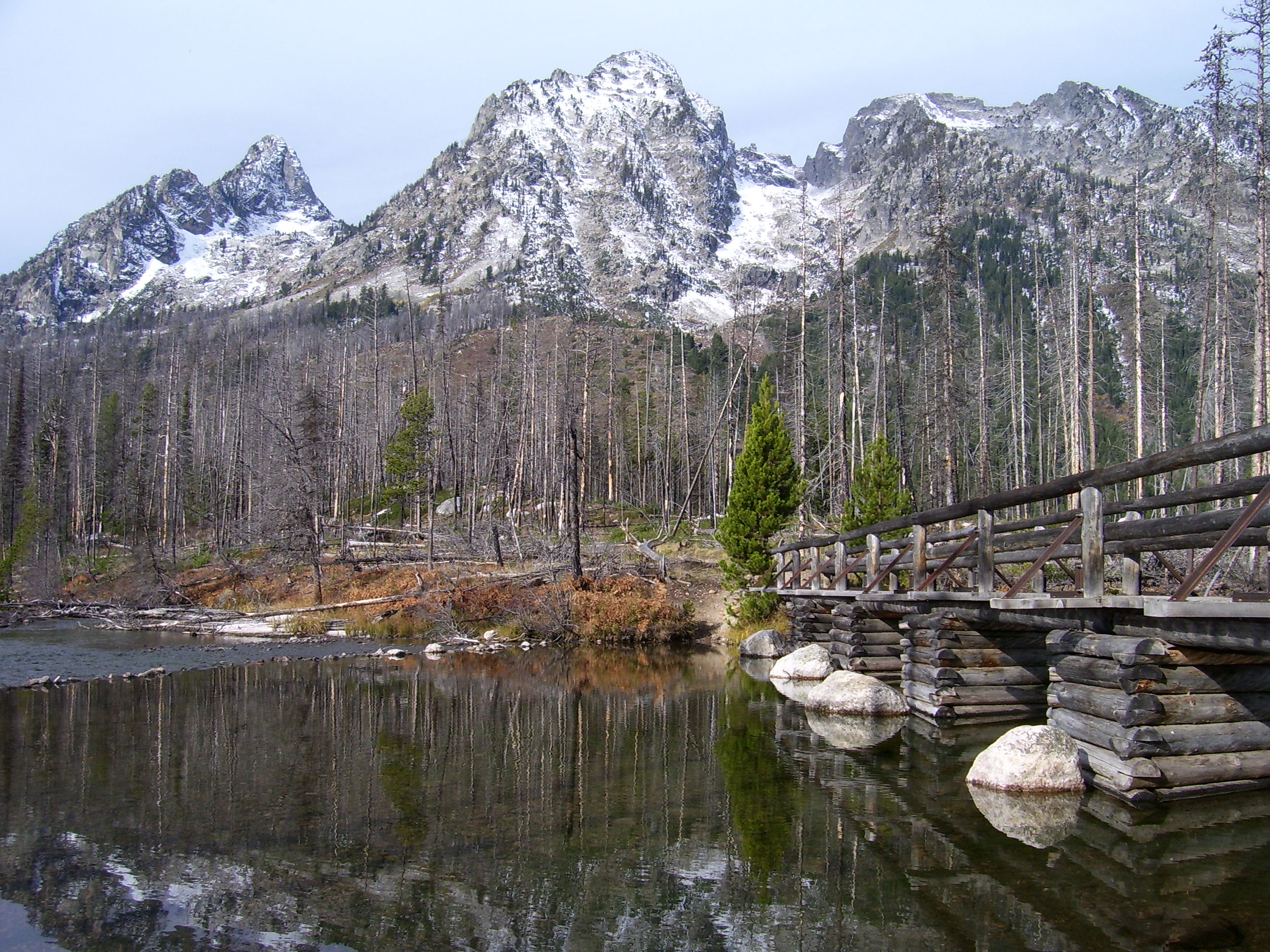
- Footbridge across String Lake
- Length: 3.7 mi (6.0 km)
- Location: Teton Range
- Trailheads: String Lake Trailhead
- Use: Hiking
- Elevation change: Approximate gain of 550 ft (170 m)
- Highest point: Near Paintbrush Canyon, 7,300 ft (2,200 m)
- Lowest point: String Lake Trailhead, 6,880 ft (2,100 m)
- Difficulty: Easy
- Season: Late Spring to Fall
- Sights: Teton Range
- Hazards: Severe weather

The String Lake Trail is a 3.7-mile (6.0 km) long hiking trail in Grand Teton National Park in the U.S. state of Wyoming. The trail circles String Lake and is also used to access the Paintbrush Canyon Trail and the Leigh Lake Trail. The String Lake trailhead is off the one-way road from North Jenny Lake Junction.

== See also ==
- List of hiking trails in Grand Teton National Park
