= Bearpaw Lake (Teton County, Wyoming) =

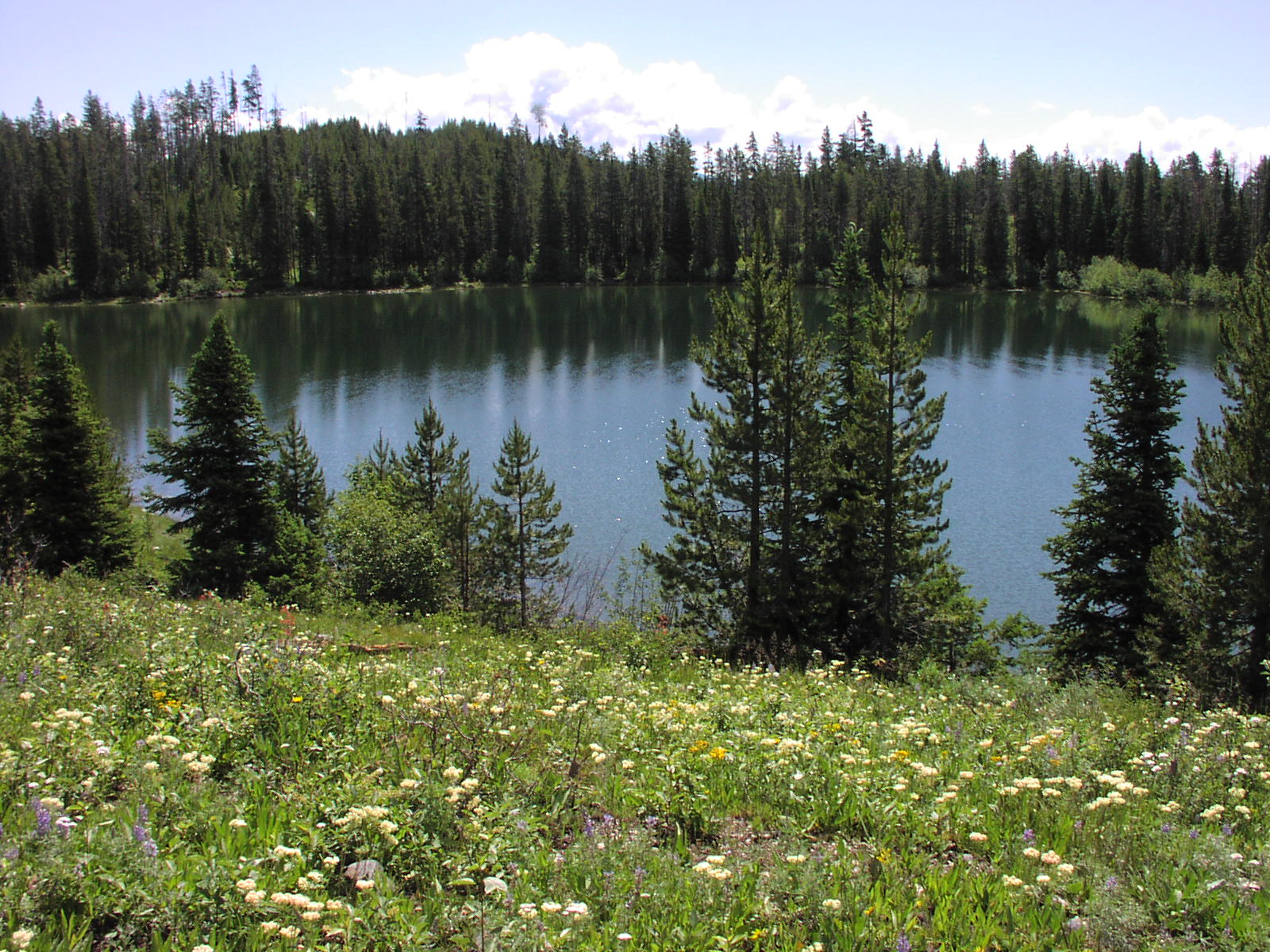
- Bearpaw Lake

- Location within Wyoming Location within the United States
- Location: Grand Teton National Park, Teton County, Wyoming, US
- Coordinates: 43°49′47″N 110°43′47″W
- Lake type: Glacial Lake
- Basin countries: United States
- Max. length: .20 mi (0.32 km)
- Max. width: .10 mi (0.16 km)
- Surface elevation: 6,848 ft (2,087 m)

Bearpaw Lake is located in Grand Teton National Park, in the U. S. state of Wyoming. Bearpaw Lake is south of Trapper Lake and north of Leigh Lake. Bearpaw Lake is an easy to moderate 9.2-mile (14.8 km) (to Trapper Lake, which is somewhat further) round trip hike along the Leigh Lake Trail. The trail starts at the String Lake trailhead and wanders north along the east shores of Leigh Lake with a 460 feet (140 m) elevation gain. Bearpaw Lake is nestled at the eastern base of Mount Moran, making snow and glacier meltwaters off Skillet Glacier feed into the lake. There are three backcountry camping sites with designated tent pads at the lake and a backcountry permit is required to use these sites.
