= Rendezvous Mountain =

Mountain in the U.S. state of Wyoming

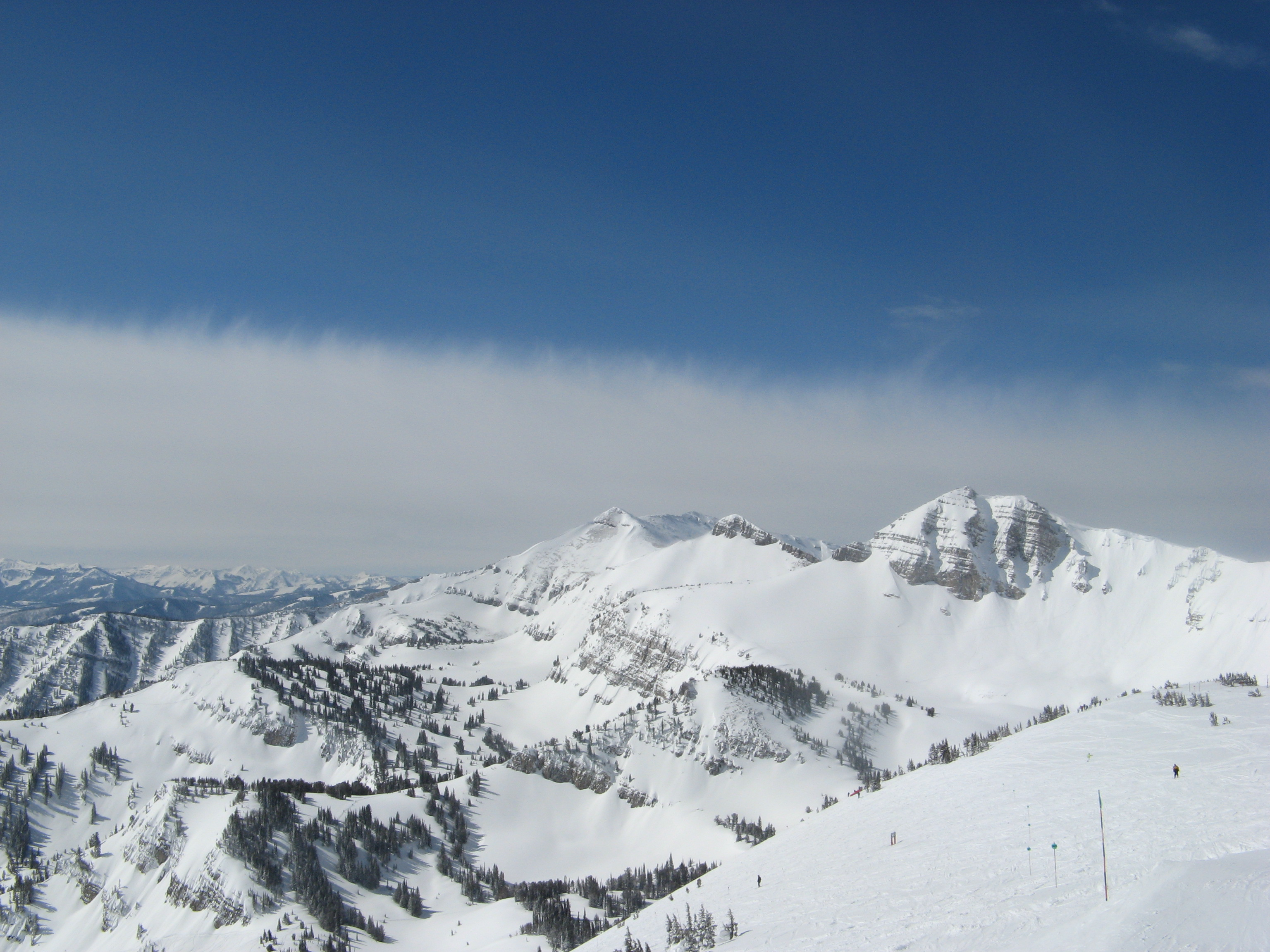
- View of Rendezvous Mountain from the top of Rendezvous Bowl at the Jackson Hole Mountain Resort

Highest point
- Elevation: 10,455 ft (3,187 m)
- Prominence: 530 ft (160 m)
- Coordinates: 43°35′50″N 110°52′14″W

Geography
- Location within Wyoming Location within the United States
- Location: Teton County, Wyoming, U.S.
- Parent range: Teton Range
- Topo map: USGS Teton Village

Climbing
- Easiest route: Tram

Rendezvous Mountain (10,455 ft (3,187 m)) is a large mountain massif located in the southern Teton Range in the U.S. state of Wyoming. The highest point on Rendezvous Mountain is Rendezvous Peak (10,927 feet (3,331 m)). The western and northern flanks of the mountain are in Grand Teton National Park, while much of the remainder of the massif is in the Bridger-Teton National Forest.

The mountain massif extends for a distance of 5 miles (8.0 km) between Granite Canyon to the north and Phillips Canyon to the south. Though there are numerous summits above 10,000 feet (3,000 m), the one that is most commonly visited is the North Peak, where the Jackson Hole Mountain Resort aerial tram provides access to the summit for skiers in the winter and sightseers and hikers in the summer. The hike down the Rendezvous Mountain Trail to the Granite Canyon Trail has a descent of 4,100 feet (1,200 m) over 12.3 miles (19.8 km).

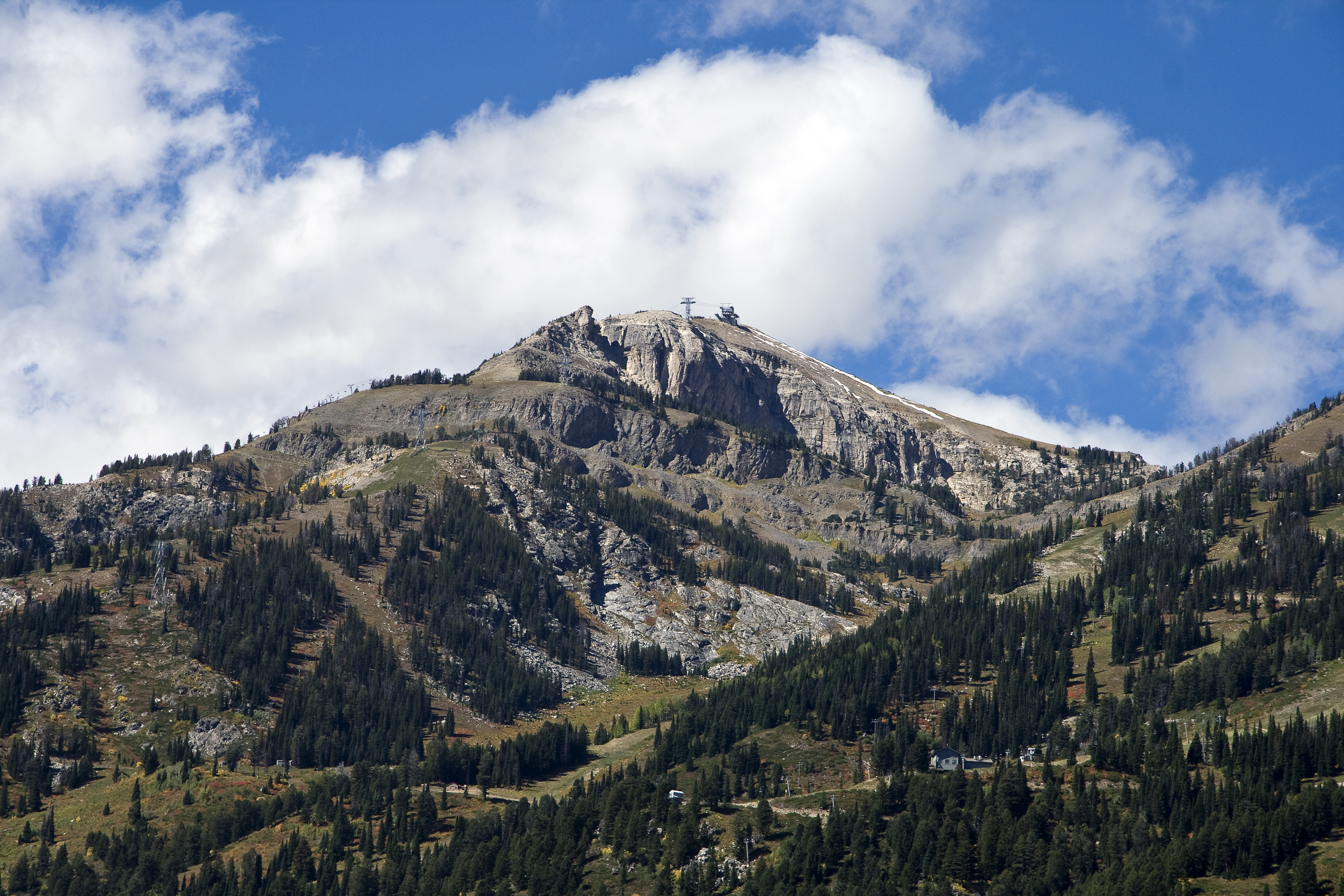
Rendezvous Mountain in summer with the various ski lifts
