= Jenny Lake Trail =

Hiking trail in Grand Teton National Park, Wyoming

Coordinates: 43°46′13″N 110°43′02″W

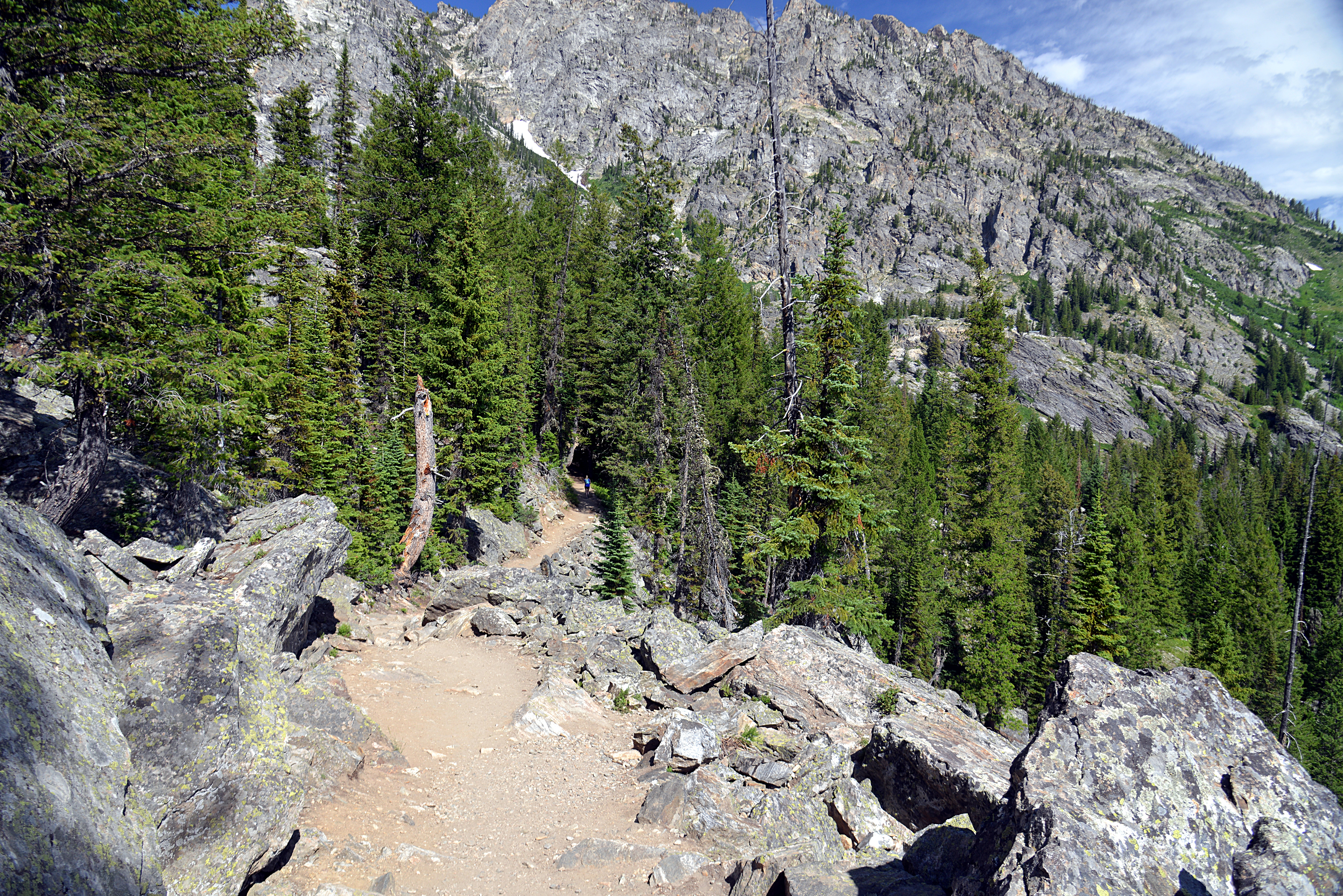
- Length: 7.1 mi (11.4 km)
- Location: Teton Range
- Trailheads: Jenny Lake Campground
- Use: Hiking
- Elevation change: Approximate gain of 700 ft (210 m)
- Highest point: Near Hidden Falls, 7,500 ft (2,300 m)
- Lowest point: Near Jenny Lake, 6,798 ft (2,072 m)
- Difficulty: Easy
- Season: Late Spring to Fall
- Sights: Teton Range; Jenny Lake

The Jenny Lake Trail is a 7.1-mile (11.4 km) long hiking trail which circles Jenny Lake located in Grand Teton National Park in the U.S. state of Wyoming. The trail begins at the Jenny Lake campground or can be accessed at several other trailheads. One of the most popular and easiest hikes in the park, the trail provides pedestrian access to the Cascade Canyon Trail and is overlapped by the Valley Trail along the west side of Jenny Lake.

== See also ==
List of hiking trails in Grand Teton National Park
