= Berry Creek Trail =

Hiking trail in Grand Teton National Park, Wyoming, U.S.

Coordinates: 43°59′41″N 110°42′35″W

- Length: 12 mi (19 km)
- Location: Teton Range
- Trailheads: Wilcox Point; Jackass Pass
- Use: Hiking/Pack animals
- Elevation change: 1,713 ft (522 m)
- Highest point: Jackass Pass, 8,482 ft (2,585 m)
- Lowest point: Jackson Lake, 6,769 ft (2,063 m)
- Difficulty: Strenuous
- Season: Summer to Fall
- Sights: Teton Range
- Hazards: Severe weather Grizzly bears Stream crossings

The Berry Creek Trail is a 12-mile (19 km) long hiking trail in the far northern region of Grand Teton National Park in the U.S. state of Wyoming. The trail begins at the National Park Service patrol cabin north of Wilcox Point on Jackson Lake and extends to Jackass Pass at the border between the park and Caribou-Targhee National Forest. Located in the remote northern backcountry of Grand Teton National Park, the trail is not connected to maintained trails in the southern part of the park and must be accessed from the Glade Creek trailhead in the John D. Rockefeller, Jr. Memorial Parkway. From Glade Creek, it is a 7.5 mi (12.1 km) hike to the Berry Creek Trail and then another 6.7 mi (10.8 km) to Jackass Pass. The Berry Creek Trail provides the easiest access to Survey Peak. The trail requires numerous stream crossings which can be dangerous during spring melt.

== See also ==
List of hiking trails in Grand Teton National Park
