= Paintbrush Divide =

- Location within Wyoming
- Elevation: 10,720 ft (3,270 m)
- Traversed by: Teton Crest Trail; Paintbrush Canyon Trail

Third Approach
- Location: Teton County, Wyoming, United States
- Range: Teton Range, Rocky Mountains
- Coordinates: 43°47′35″N 110°49′05″W
- Topo map: USGS Mount Moran, WY

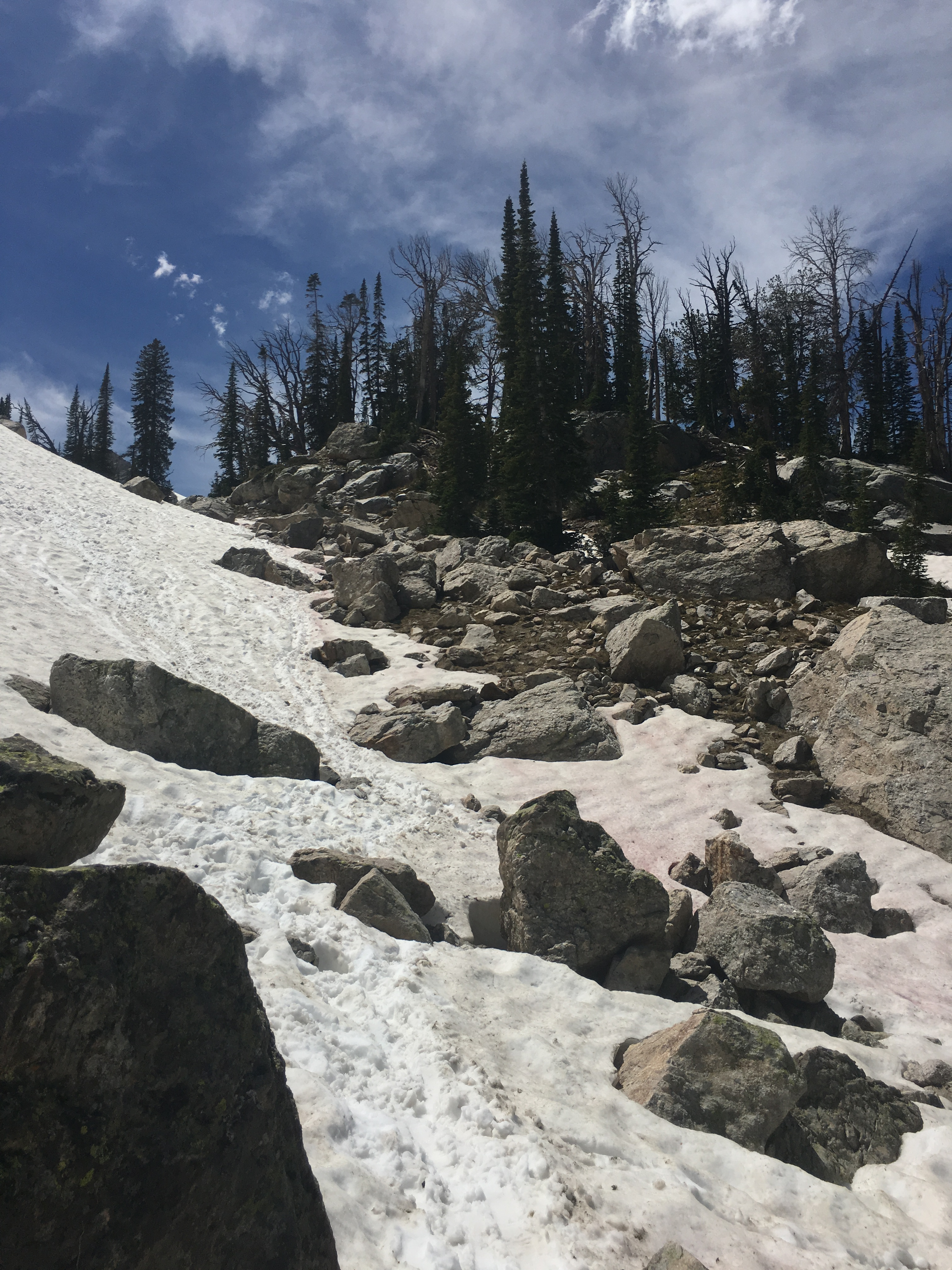
Paintbrush Divide

Paintbrush Divide is a pedestrian mountain pass located in the Teton Range, Grand Teton National Park, in the U.S. state of Wyoming. Situated at approximately 10,720 ft (3,270 m) above sea level, the pass can be accessed from the east by way of the Paintbrush Canyon or Cascade Canyon Trails and involves a nearly 4,000 ft (1,200 m) elevation gain.
