= Rendezvous Mountain Trail =

Hiking trail in Wyoming, United States

Coordinates: 43°35′40″N 110°53′58″W

- Length: 4.8 mi (7.7 km)
- Location: Teton Range
- Trailheads: Top of Rendezvous Mountain; Granite Canyon Trail
- Use: Hiking
- Elevation change: Approximate loss of 2,450 ft (750 m)
- Highest point: Rendezvous Mountain, 10,450 ft (3,190 m)
- Lowest point: Granite Canyon Trail, 8,000 ft (2,400 m)
- Difficulty: Moderate to Strenuous
- Season: Summer to Fall
- Sights: Teton Range
- Hazards: Severe weather

The Rendezvous Mountain Trail is a 4.8-mile (7.7 km) long hiking trail in Grand Teton National Park in the U.S. state of Wyoming. Most often used to descend from the top of Rendezvous Mountain after riding the Jackson Hole Mountain Resort ski lift to the top of the peak, the trail descends 4.8 mi (7.7 km) to junction with the Granite Canyon Trail adjacent to the Upper Granite Canyon Patrol Cabin.

== See also ==
List of hiking trails in Grand Teton National Park
