= Bradley Lake =

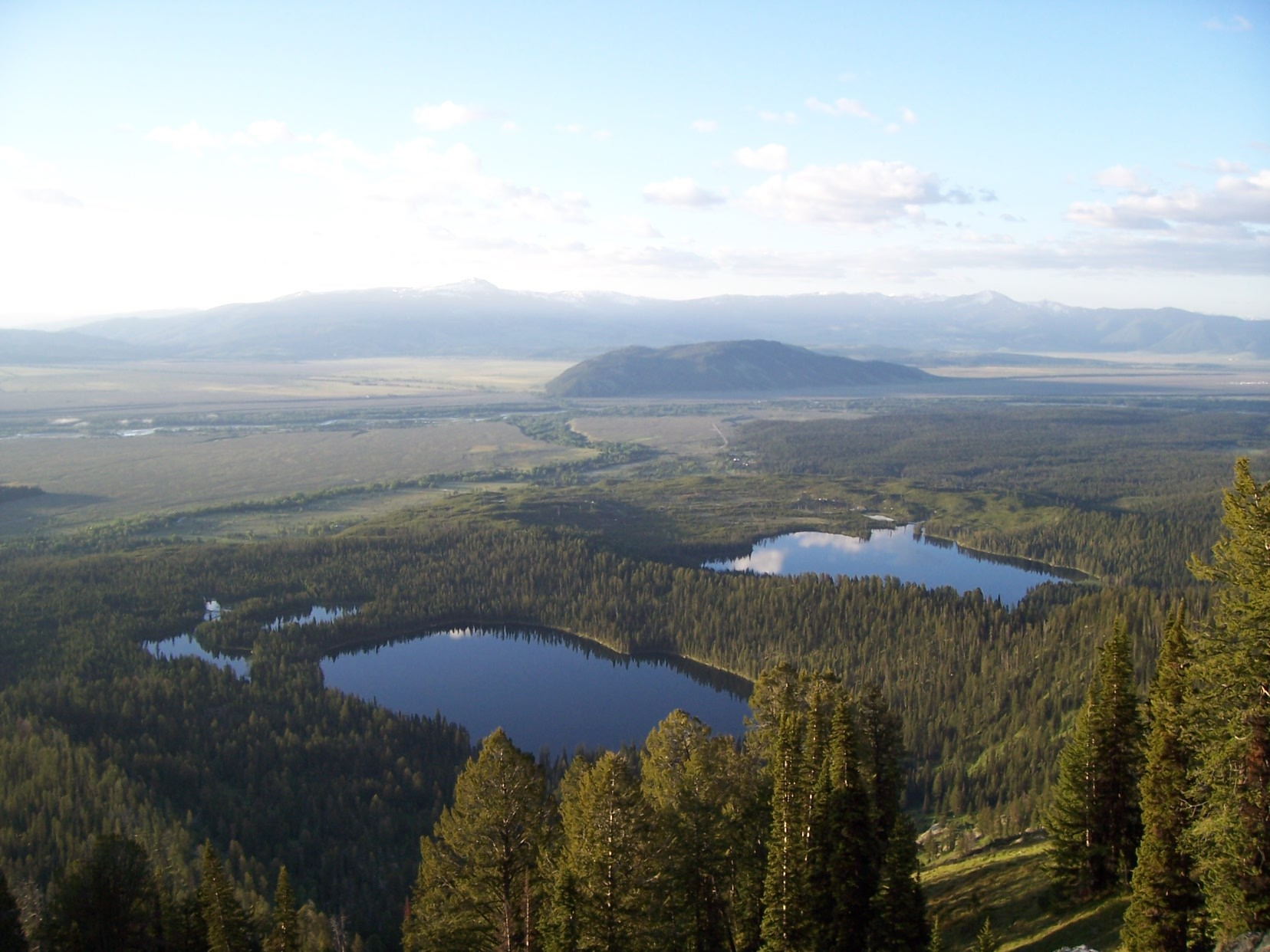
- Bradley Lake, center with Taggart Lake, right.

- Location within Wyoming
- Location: Grand Teton National Park, Teton County, Wyoming, US
- Coordinates: 43°42′51″N 110°45′18″W
- Type: Glacial Lake
- Primary inflows: Garnet Creek
- Primary outflows: Cottonwood Creek
- Basin countries: United States
- Max. length: .75 mi (1.21 km)
- Max. width: .45 mi (0.72 km)
- Surface area: 215 acres (87 ha)
- Surface elevation: 7,027 ft (2,142 m)

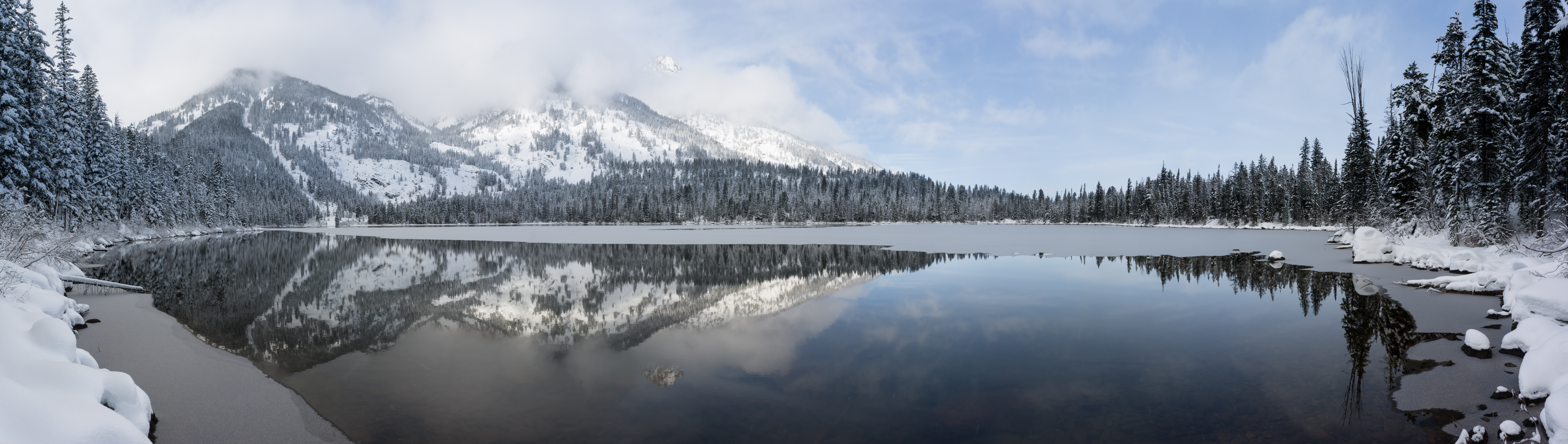
A winter view of Bradley Lake in Grand Teton National Park looking northwest from the southeast corner of the lake. The prominently reflected peak near the center is Teewinot Mountain.

Bradley Lake is located in Grand Teton National Park, in the U. S. state of Wyoming. The glacially formed lake is located near the terminus of Garnet Canyon. Bradley Lake can be accessed by the Bradley Lake Trail, a 4 miles (6.4 km) roundtrip hike commencing from the Taggart Lake trailhead parking area. The lake is less than one and a half miles (2.4 km) north of Taggart Lake.

== See also ==
- Geology of the Grand Teton area
