= Jenny Lake =

Lake in Teton County, Wyoming, United States

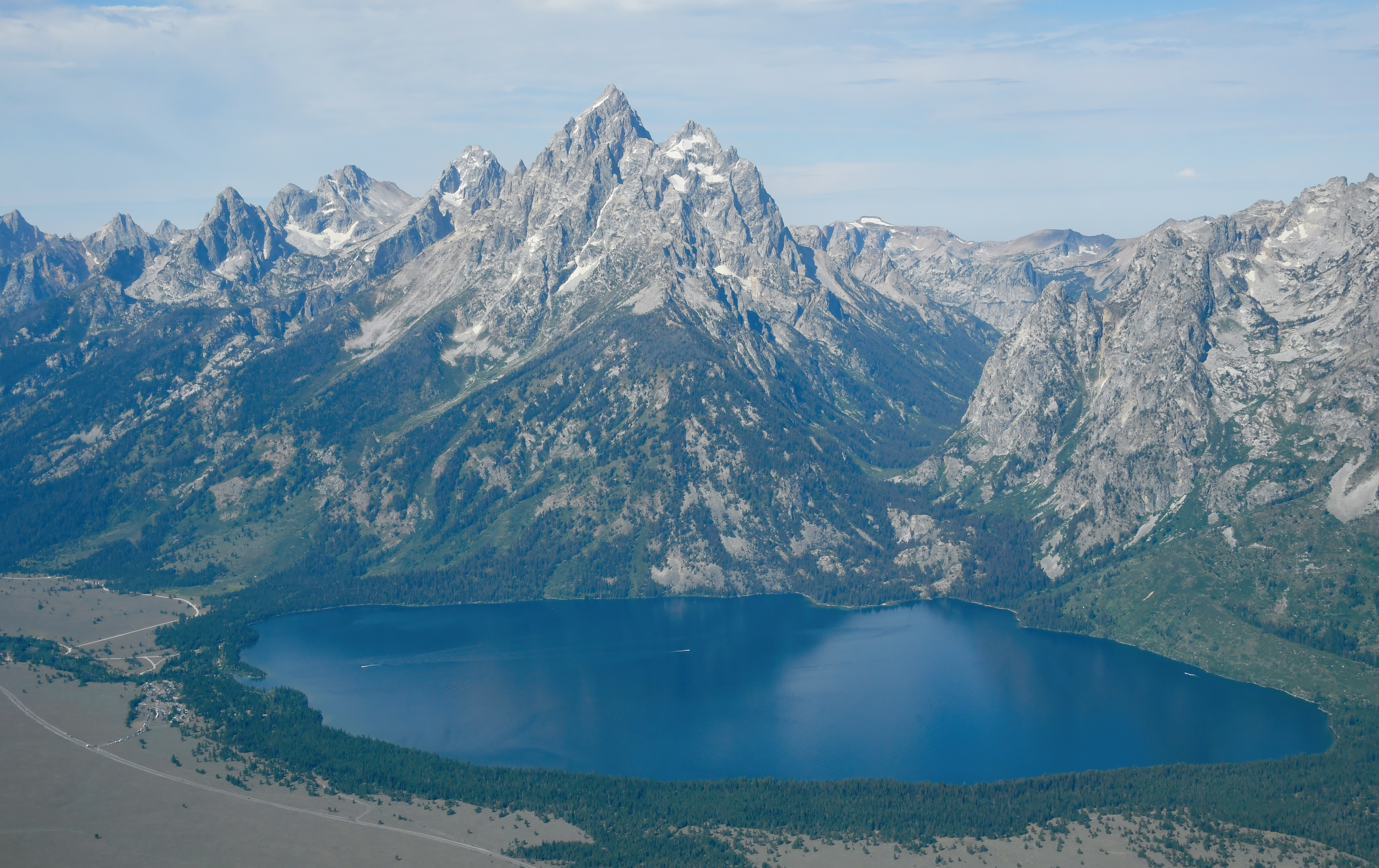
- Aerial view of Jenny Lake in front of the Cathedral Group

- Location within Wyoming
- Location: Grand Teton National Park, Teton County, Wyoming, US
- Coordinates: 43°45′50″N 110°43′48″W
- Type: Glacial Lake
- Primary inflows: Cascade Creek and String Lake
- Primary outflows: Cottonwood Creek
- Basin countries: United States
- Max. length: 2.2 mi (3.5 km)
- Max. width: 1.2 mi (1.9 km)
- Surface area: 1,191 acres (482 ha)
- Max. depth: 456 ft (139 m)
- Surface elevation: 6,783 ft (2,067 m)

Jenny Lake is located in Grand Teton National Park in the U.S. state of Wyoming. The lake was formed approximately 12,000 years ago by glaciers pushing rock debris which carved Cascade Canyon during the last glacial maximum, forming a terminal moraine which now impounds the lake. The lake is estimated to be 256 feet (78 m) deep and encompasses 1,191 acres (482 ha). Jenny Lake is considered to be a major focal point in Grand Teton National Park, with many hiking trails, scenic boat rides, and quick access to the major climbing routes onto the tallest peaks of the Teton Range.

Jenny and Jackson Lakes are the only lakes in Grand Teton National Park where motorboats are permitted; both lakes have scenic tours available. A 2005 study of the water quality of the lakes in Grand Teton National Park indicated that all the lakes in the park were still considered pristine and that they had not been impacted by air or water pollution.

Jenny Lake is a starting point for many day and overnight hiking trips. The 7.1-mile (11.4 km) Jenny Lake Trail loops around the lake and is considered to be relatively easy due to the small elevation gain of 700 feet (210 m). However, the elevation increases rapidly once Cascade Canyon is entered.

Jenny Lake is named after a Shoshone Indian woman who married an Englishman, Richard "Beaver Dick" Leigh. Jenny and their six children died of smallpox in 1876.

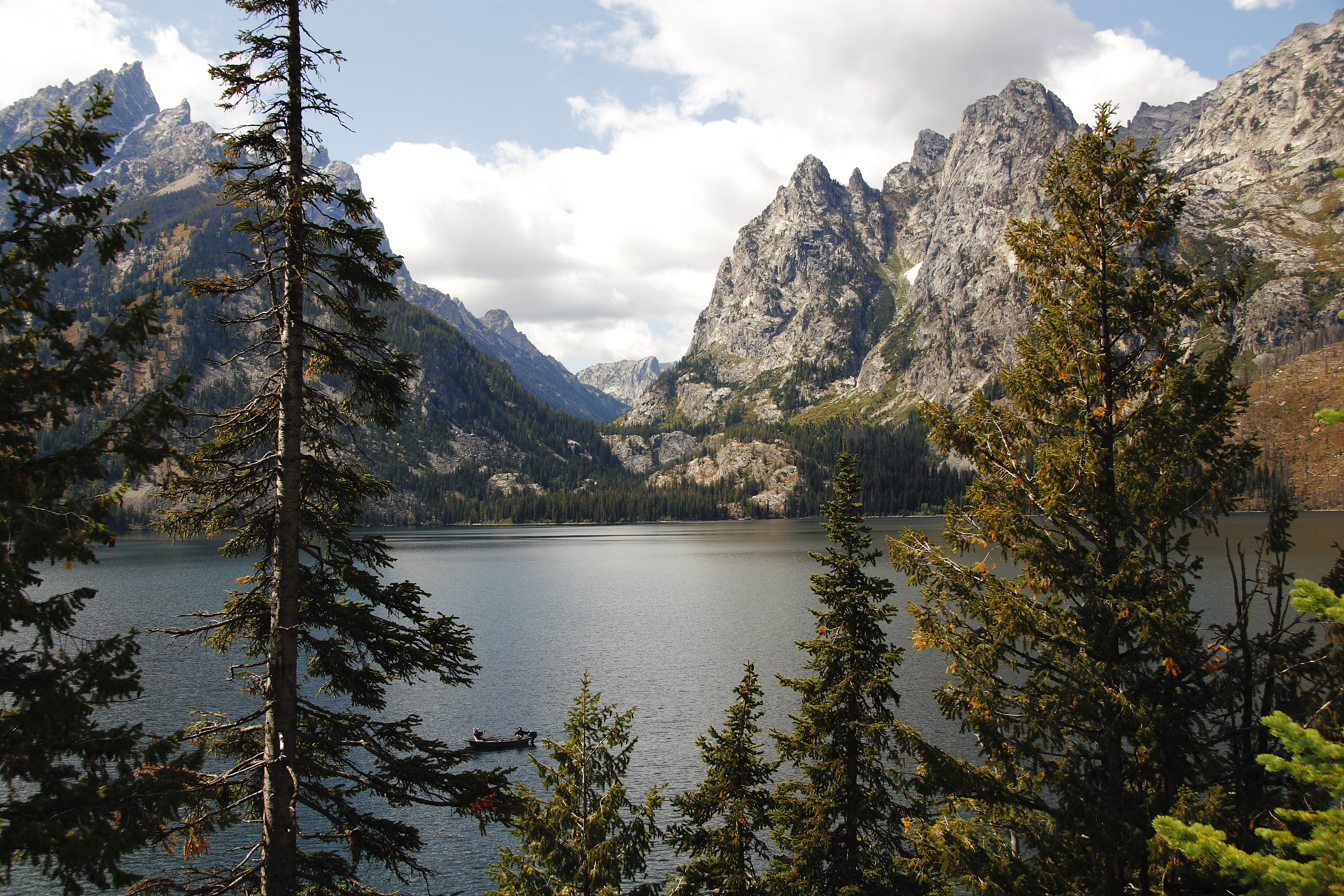
Jenny Lake at the foot of Cascade Canyon

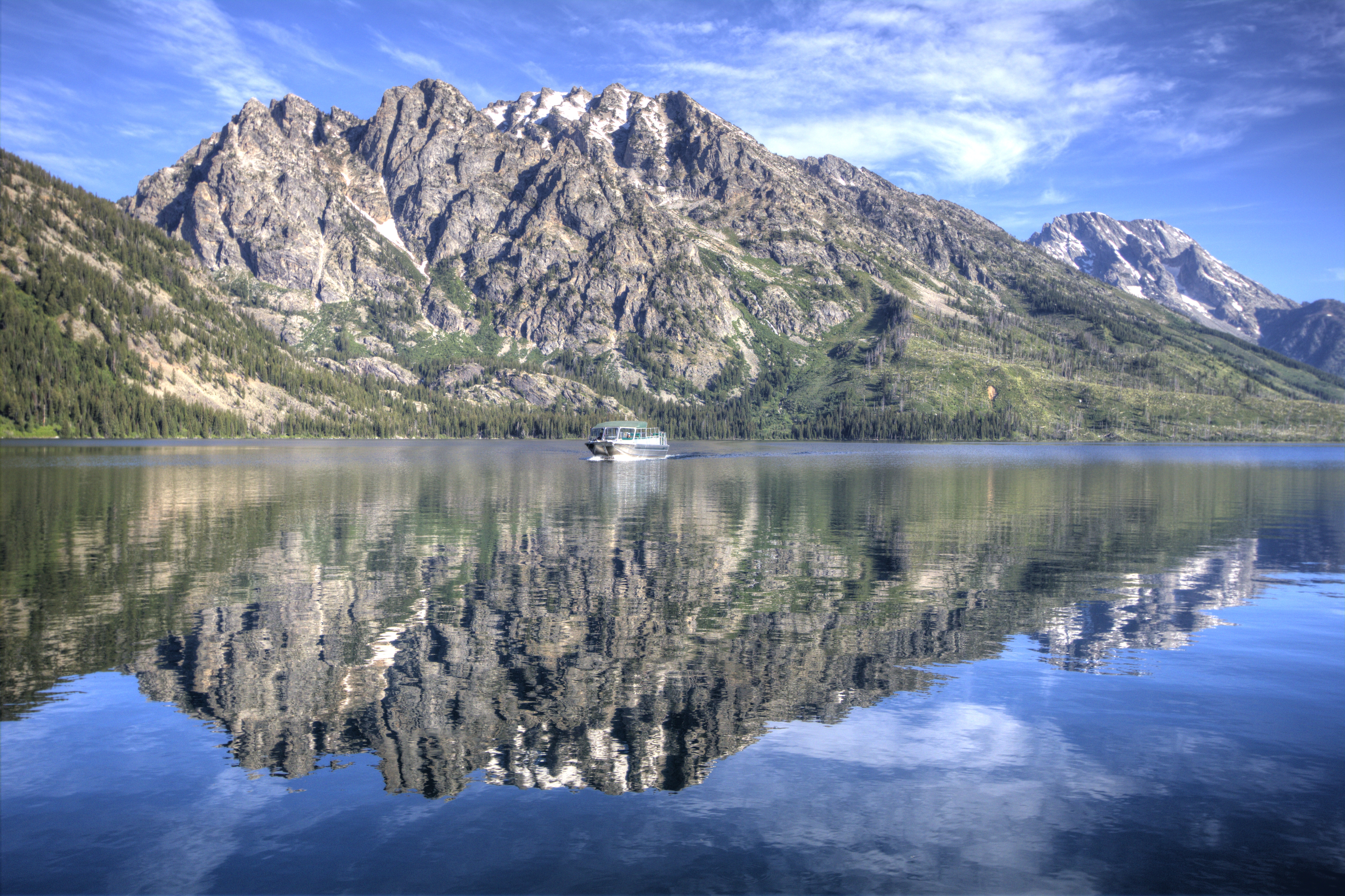
Boat ride across Jenny Lake to Cascade Canyon

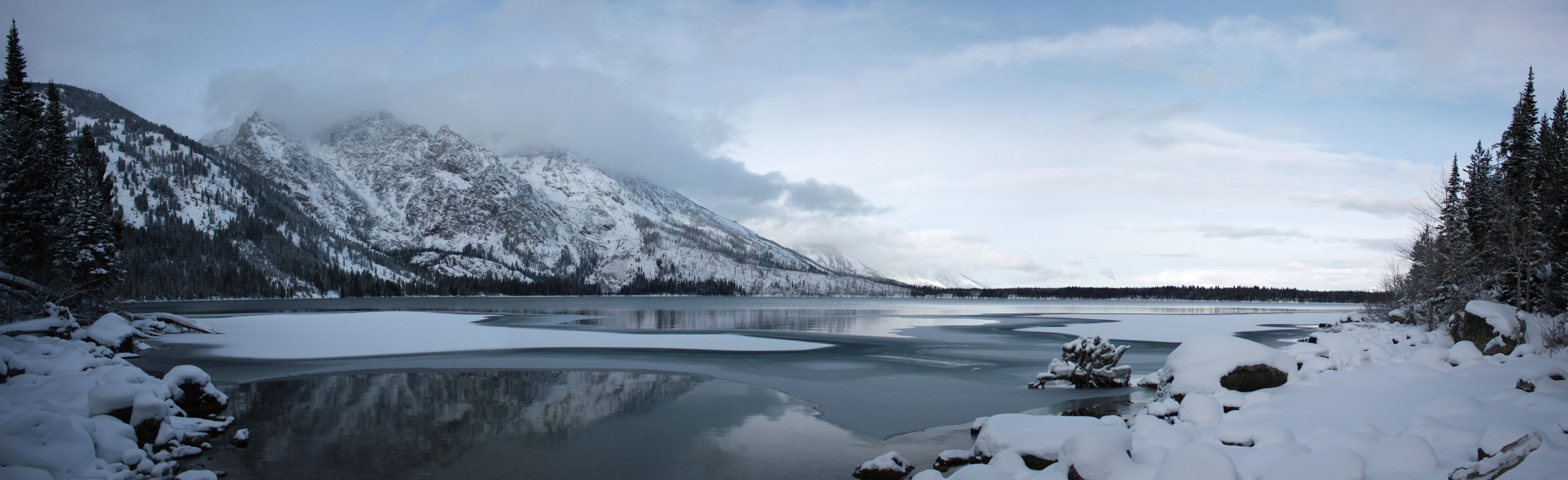
Jenny Lake in December

== See also ==
- Jenny Lake Ranger Station Historic District
