= List of lakes of Wyoming =

Following is a list of lakes in Wyoming. Information listed is taken from the infobox in the associated article unless otherwise specified. Swimming, fishing, and/or boating are permitted in some of these lakes, but not all.

Name	Location	Coordinates
Amphitheater Lake	Grand Teton National Park, Teton County	43°43′47″N 110°46′52″W
Lake Alice	Lincoln County	42°24.7′N 110°44.7′W
Bradley Lake	Grand Teton National Park, Teton County	43°42′51″N 110°45′18″W
Dudley Lake	Grand Teton National Park, Teton County	43°52′48″N 110°46′54″W
Emma Matilda Lake	Grand Teton National Park, Teton County	43°53′11″N 110°31′58″W
Flaming Gorge Reservoir	Sweetwater County	41°09′41″N 109°33′04″W
Fremont Lake	Sublette County	42°56′37″N 109°48′27″W
Jackson Lake	Grand Teton National Park, Teton County	43°54′02″N 110°40′26″W
Jenny Lake	Grand Teton National Park, Teton County	43°45′50″N 110°43′48″W
Leigh Lake	Grand Teton National Park, Teton County	43°48′43″N 110°43′56″W
New Fork Lake	Sublette County	43°5′45″N 109°56′47″W
Phelps Lake	Grand Teton National Park, Teton County	43°38′34″N 110°47′41″W
Lake Solitude	Grand Teton National Park, Teton County	43°47′33″N 110°50′41″W
String Lake	Grand Teton National Park, Teton County	43°47′16″N 110°44′01″W
Taggart Lake	Grand Teton National Park, Teton County	43°42′15″N 110°45′17″W
Ocean Lake	Fremont County	43°11′04″N 108°36′02″W
Two Ocean Lake	Grand Teton National Park, Teton County	43°54′34″N 110°31′25″W
Wrangler Lake	Yellowstone National Park, Park County	44°41′0″N 110°26′5″W
Willow Lake	Sublette County	43°0′09″N 109°52′09″W
Yellowstone Lake	Yellowstone National Park, Teton County	44°28′N 110°22′W
Lake De Smet	Johnson County	44°27′58″N 106°44′18″W

== See also ==
- List of dams and reservoirs in Wyoming
- List of rivers in Wyoming
