= Lakes of Grand Teton National Park =

Lakes of United States Grand Teton National Park in northwestern Wyoming

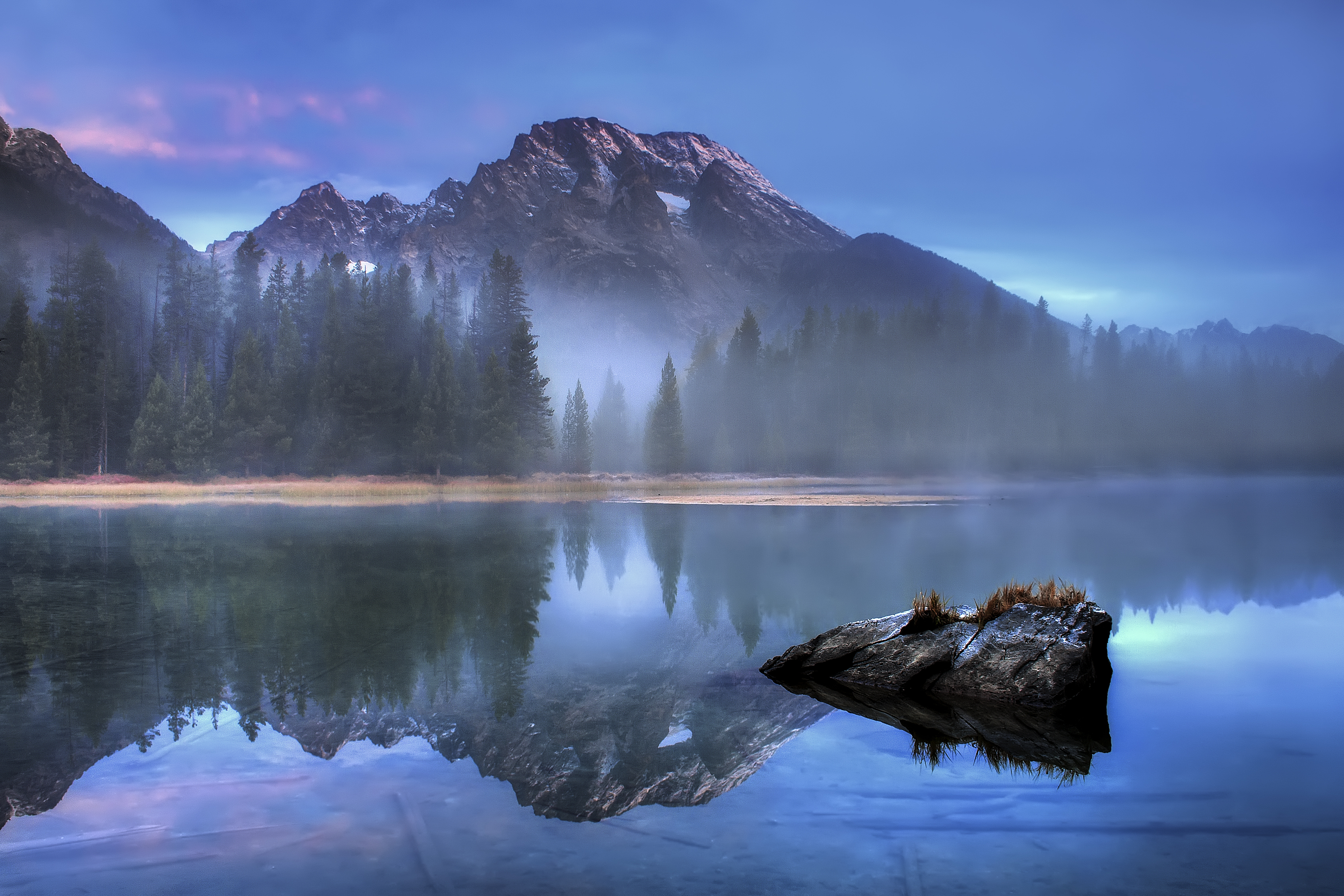
Mount Moran Reflected in String Lake - Grand Teton National Park

There are 44 named and countless unnamed lakes in Grand Teton National Park. The largest of these is Jackson Lake, a natural glacial lake that has been enlarged with the construction of the Jackson Lake Dam. The lakes range in size as well as ease of access. In addition to mountain tarns, there are several large peidmont lakes. Nearly all the lakes are glacial in origin, formed by glacial action that carved out the valleys and left moraine behind that acted as dams to lock in water.

The lakes exist in the near pristine wilderness environment of the park, and recreational use, boating and fishing varies by lake. Elevation of the region classes these as alpine lakes, with Jackson lake being the largest alpine lake in the United States.

== Overview ==
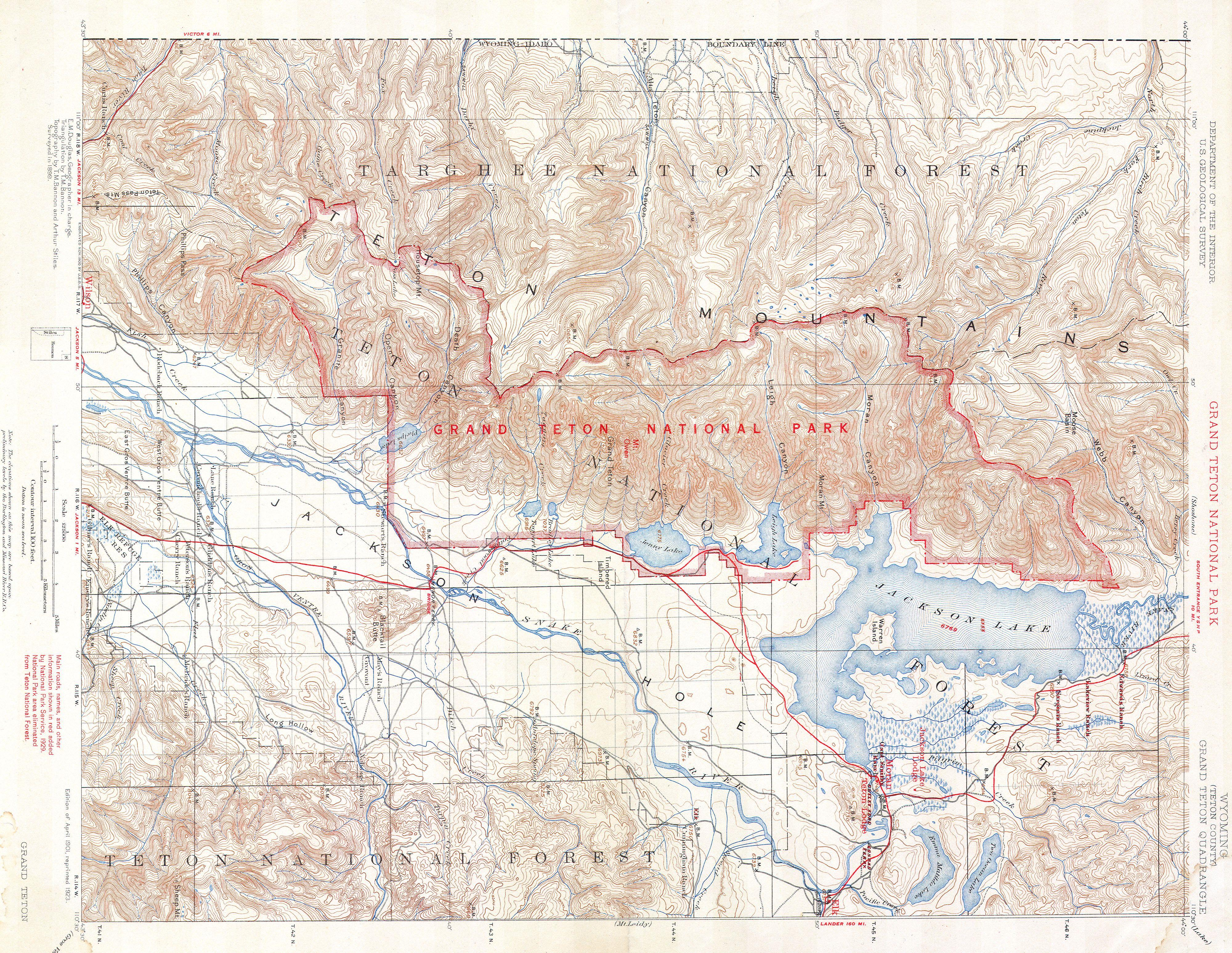
1929 U.S.G.S. Map of Grand Teton National Park, Wyoming - Geographicus - GrandTeton-USGS-1929 (Note: This map was surveyed in 1901 but in this 1931 edition it shows the 1929 boundary of the original Grand Teton National Park, including 6 piedmont lakes as well as the main peaks.)

At its formation in 1929, Grand Teton National Park encompassed just six main lakes at the foot of the park's major peaks, but with the expansion of the park there are now 44 named lakes within the boundary, and countless smaller unnamed lakes and ponds. The peaks were raised in relatively recent geological time and carved by glaciers in the ica age. Most of the lakes in the park were formed by glaciers, which carved out the valleys they sit in, and where glacial morraine formed the dams that created the lakes. The largest lakes are still found at the base of the Teton Range. In the northern section of the park lies Jackson Lake, the largest lake in the park at 15 mi (24 km) in length, 5 mi (8.0 km) wide, and 438 ft (134 m) deep. Though Jackson Lake is natural, the Jackson Lake Dam was constructed at its outlet before the creation of the park, and the lake level was raised almost 40 ft (12 m) consequently. East of the Jackson Lake Lodge lies Emma Matilda and Two Ocean Lakes. South of Jackson Lake, Leigh, Jenny, Bradley, Taggart and Phelps Lakes rest at the outlets of the canyons which lead into the Teton Range. Within the Teton Range, small alpine lakes in cirques are common, and there are more than 100 scattered throughout the high country. Lake Solitude, located at an elevation of 9,035 ft (2,754 m), is in a cirque at the head of the North Fork of Cascade Canyon. Other high-altitude lakes can be found at over 10,000 ft (3,000 m) in elevation and a few, such as Icefloe Lake, remain ice-clogged for much of the year. The park is not noted for large waterfalls; however, 100-foot-high (30 m) Hidden Falls just west of Jenny Lake is easy to reach after a short hike.

A 2005 study of the water quality of the lakes in Grand Teton National Park indicated that the lakes in the park were still considered pristine and that they had not been impacted by air or water pollution.

=== Human history ===
Paleo-Indian presence along the shores of Jackson Lake is attested from 11,000 years ago in what is now Grand Teton National Park. Jackson Hole valley climate at that time was colder and more alpine than the semi-arid climate found today, and the first humans were migratory hunter-gatherers spending summer months in Jackson Hole and wintering in the valleys west of the Teton Range. Along the shores of Jackson Lake, fire pits, tools, and what are thought to have been fishing weights have been discovered. One of the tools found is of a type associated with the Clovis culture, and tools from this cultural period date back at least 11,500 years. Some of the tools are made of obsidian which chemical analysis indicates came from sources near present-day Teton Pass, south of Grand Teton National Park. Though obsidian was also available north of Jackson Hole, virtually all the obsidian spear points found are from a source to the south, indicating that the main seasonal migratory route for the Paleo-Indian was from this direction. Elk, which winter on the National Elk Refuge at the southern end of Jackson Hole and northwest into higher altitudes during spring and summer, follow a similar migratory pattern to this day.From 11,000 to about 500 years ago, there is little evidence of change in the migratory patterns amongst the Native American groups in the region and no evidence that indicates any permanent human settlement.

=== Lake formation ===
Creation of lakes by a receding glacier

Some 34 million years ago, the forces of the Laramide orogeny (Note: The tectonic setting of western North America changed drastically as the Farallon Plate under the Pacific Ocean to the west was shallowly subducted below North American Plate. Called the Laramide orogeny, the compressive forces generated from this collision erased the Cretaceous Seaway, fused the Sierran Arc to the rest of North America and created the Rocky Mountains. This mountain-building event started in the Mesozoic 80 million years ago and lasted well into the first half of the Cenozoic era 30 million years ago.) had uplifted a broad part of western Wyoming into a continuous high plateau. This region includes areas now occupied by the Teton Range, Gros Ventre Range, Wind River Mountains and other mountain ranges to the south and east of the Tetons.

Beginning around 13 million years ago in the Miocene, a 40-mile (64-km) long steeply east dipping geological fault system called the Teton Fault began to vertically move two adjacent blocks. One block, the Jackson Hole basin, moved downwards while the other block, containing the westward-tilting eastern part of the Teton Range, moved up, creating the Teton massif. This very recent event in geological time created some of the youngest mountains in North America.

In the most recent glaciation, known as the Pinedale glaciation in the Rocky Mountains (from 30,000 - 10,000 years ago), the greater Teton and Yellowstone region contained one of the largest mountain glacier ice complexes in the western US. The previous rapid uplift of the Precambrian bedrock of the region and glacial erosion created a dramatic landscape that was carved out by the Pinedale glaciation, leaving significant glacial deposits behind when the ice retreated. The deposits are in the form of moraines, till and outwash. Sediment fill created a region of lakes, creating the natural dams that formed the lakes and also marked the glacial maxima, and marking the glacial retreat.

== Recreation ==
=== Hiking ===
Although some lakes are readily accessible, most can only be reached on foot and some are rarely visited owing to their inaccessibility.

The park has 200 mi (320 km) of hiking trails, ranging in difficulty from easy to strenuous. The Two Ocean Lake Trail is considered to be a relatively easy lake hike in the Jackson Lake Lodge area. Other easy lake hikes include the Valley Trail which runs from Trapper Lake in the north to the south park boundary near Teton Village and the Jenny Lake Trail which circles the lake.

=== Boating and fishing ===
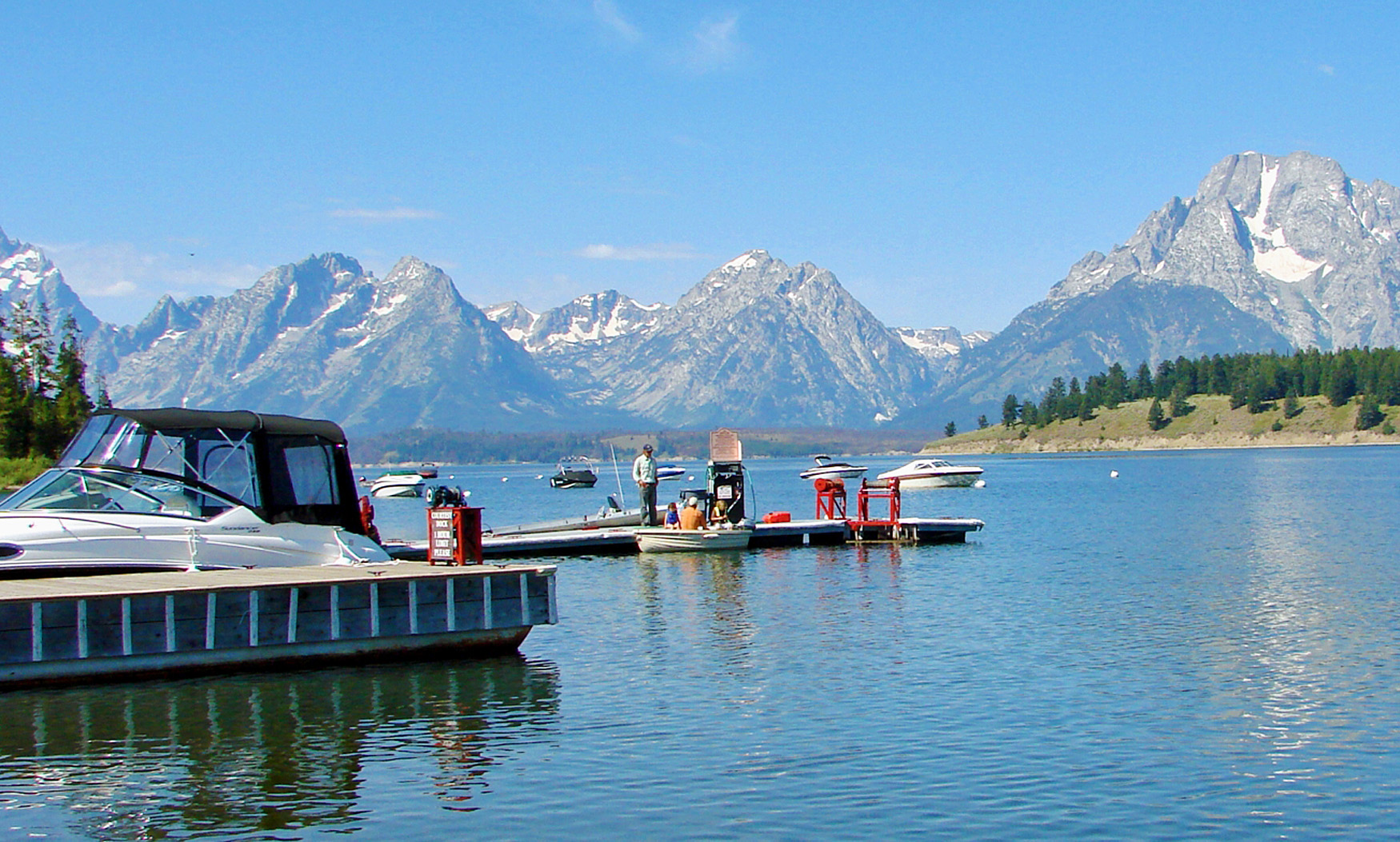
Colter Bay Marina, Jackson Lake

Grand Teton National Park allows boating on all the lakes in Jackson Hole, but motorized boats can only be used on Jackson and Jenny Lakes. While there is no maximum horsepower limit on Jackson Lake (though there is a noise restriction), Jenny Lake is restricted to 10 horsepower. Only non-motorized boats are permitted on Bearpaw, Bradley, Emma Matilda, Leigh, Phelps, String, Taggart and Two Ocean Lakes. There are four designated boat launches located on Jackson Lake and one on Jenny Lake. Additionally, sailboats, windsurfers, and water skiing are only allowed on Jackson Lake and no jet skis are permitted on any of the park waterways. All boats are required to comply with various safety regulations including personal flotation devices for each passenger. Only non-motorized watercraft are permitted on the Snake River. All other waterways in the park are off limits to boating, and this includes all alpine lakes and tributary streams of the Snake River.

In 2010, Grand Teton National Park started requiring all boats to display an Aquatic Invasive Species decal issued by the Wyoming Game and Fish Department or a Yellowstone National Park boat permit. In an effort to keep the park waterways free of various invasive species such as the Zebra mussel and whirling disease, boaters are expected to abide by certain regulations including displaying a self-certification of compliance on the dashboard of any vehicle attached to an empty boat trailer.

Grand Teton National Park fisheries are managed by the Wyoming Fish and Game Department and a Wyoming state fishing license is required to fish all waterways in Grand Teton National Park. The creel limit for trout is restricted to six per day, including no more than three cutthroat trout with none longer than 12 in (30 cm), while the maximum length of other trout species may not exceed 20 in (51 cm), except those taken from Jackson Lake, where the maximum allowable length is 24 in (61 cm). There are also restrictions as to the seasonal accessibility to certain areas as well as the types of bait and fishing tackle permitted.

== The Major Lakes ==
Six glacial piedmont (Note: A piedmont lake is a lake located in a piedmont area, which is an area at the base of a mountain or mountain range.) lakes that lie at the foot of the major peaks of the Tetons were included in the original 1929 boundary of the national park. These were Jenny, Leigh, Bradley, Taggart and Phelps Lakes, along with String Lake although it is not named on the maps. The largest lake, Jackson, was not within the original park boundary.

Piedmont Lakes
| Lake | Elevation | Length | Width | Depth | Coordinates |
|---|---|---|---|---|---|
| Jackson Lake | 6,772 ft (2,064 m) | 15 mi (24 km) | 7 mi (11 km) | 438 ft (134 m) | 43°54′02″N 110°40′26″W |
| Jenny Lake | 6,783 ft (2,067 m) | 2.2 mi (3.5 km) | 1.2 mi (1.9 km) | 456 ft (139 m) | 43°45′50″N 110°43′48″W |
| Leigh Lake | 6,877 ft (2,096 m) | 2.8 mi (4.5 km) | 2.4 mi (3.9 km) | 250 ft (76 m) | 43°48′43″N 110°43′56″W |
| Bradley Lake | 7,027 ft (2,142 m) | .75 mi (1.21 km) | .45 mi (0.72 km) | | 43°42′51″N 110°45′18″W |
| Taggart Lake | 6,902 ft (2,104 m) | .45 mi (0.72 km) | .40 mi (0.64 km) | 80 ft (24 m). | 43°42′15″N 110°45′17″W |
| Phelps Lake | 6,633 ft (2,022 m) | 1.5 mi (2.4 km) | .75 mi (1.21 km) | | 43°38′34″N 110°47′41″W |
| String Lake | 6,870 ft (2,090 m) | 1.3 mi (2.1 km) | .20 mi (0.32 km) | | 43°43′47″N 110°46′52″W |

=== Jackson Lake ===
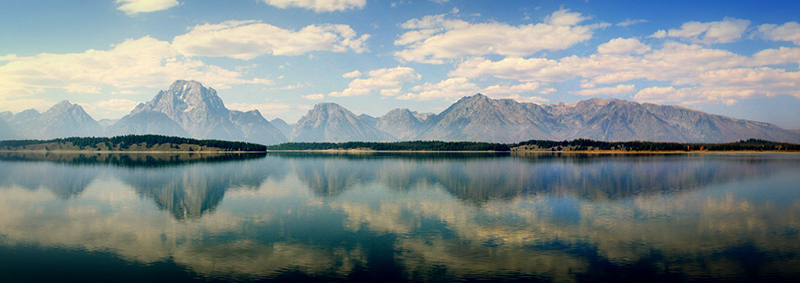
Jackson Lake

Jackson Lake is the largest lake in the national park. Although not within the original park boundary, the lake was incorporated with the Jackson Hole National Monument into the park in 1943. It is a reservoir although it was originally a natural glacial lake. The Jackson Lake Dam extends the size of the lake which provides storage of water for irrigation. The lake is fed by the Snake River. The Snake River then flows from there southward through Jackson Hole, exiting the park just west of the Jackson Hole Airport. The largest lakes in the park all drain either directly or by tributary streams into the Snake River.

Jackson Lake is one of the largest high altitude lakes in the United States, at an elevation of 6,772 ft (2,064 m) above sea level. The lake is up to 15 mi (24 km) long, 7 mi (11 km) wide, and 438 ft (134 m) deep. The water of the lake averages below 60 °F (16 °C), even during the summer.

=== Jenny Lake ===
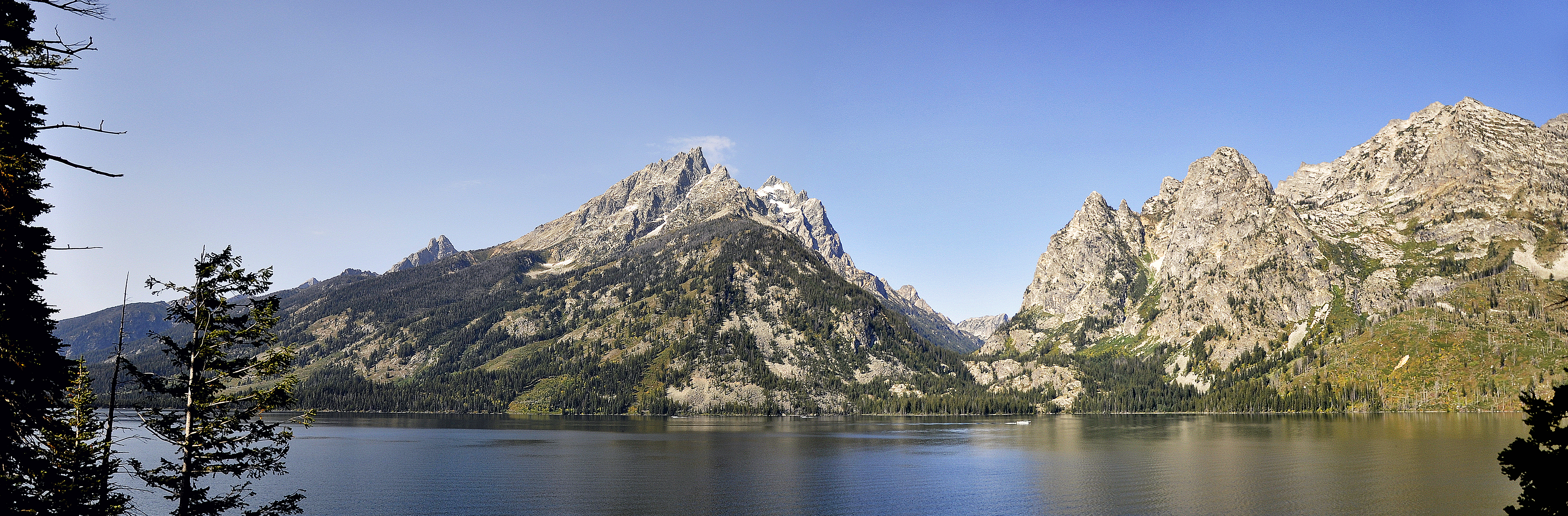
Jenny Lake

Jenny Lake is one of the most visited places in Grand Teton National Park, and home to the Jenny Lake Visitor Centre. The lake is named after a Shoshone Indian woman who married an Englishman, Richard "Beaver Dick" Leigh. Jenny, and their 6 children, died of Smallpox in 1876.

Boating is permitted on this lake, and a shuttle boat crosses it to access the Hidden Falls and other sights.

Two lake is fed by inflows from Cascade Creek, and a stream that emanates from String Lake which lies to the north. The catchment areas of lake's inflows span the full elevation gradient of the major peaks. Jenny Lake is at an elevation of 6,783 ft (2,067 m) and is 2.2 mi (3.5 km) long, 1.2 mi (1.9 km) wide, and 456 ft (139 m) deep.

=== Leigh Lake ===
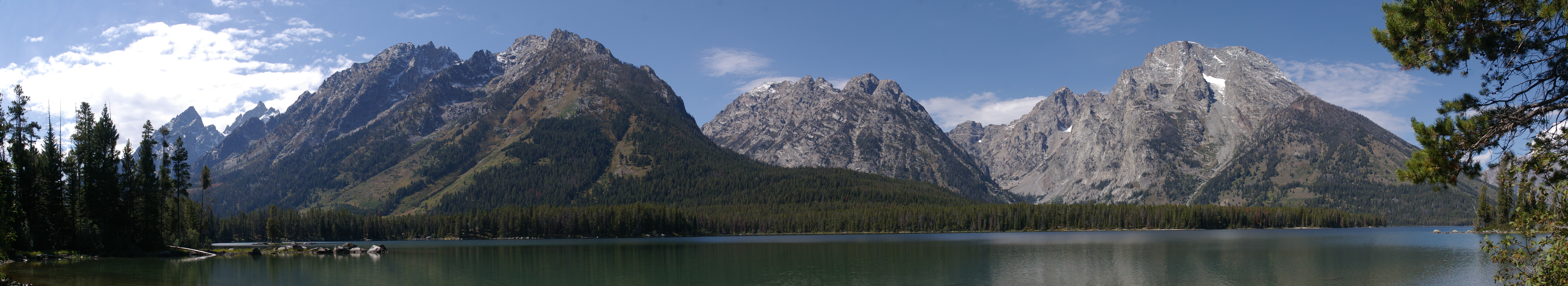
Leigh Lake

Leigh Lake was named for Richard "Beaver Dick" Leigh, husband of Jenny Leigh for whom Jenny Lake is named. Leigh was a mountain guide.

The Leigh Lake Ranger Patrol Cabin is located on the northeast shore of the lake and is on the National Register of Historic Places.

Leigh Lake has an elevation of 6,877 ft (2,096 m) and is 2.8 mi (4.5 km) long, 2.4 mi (3.9 km) wide, and 250 ft (76 m) deep.

=== Bradley and Taggart Lakes ===
Bradley and Taggart lakes are two of the original six lakes enclosed in the 1929 park boundary, lying close together.

Bradley Lake is located near the terminus of Garnet Canyon. Bradley Lake can be accessed by the Bradley Lake Trail, a 4 miles (6.4 km) roundtrip hike commencing from the Taggart Lake trailhead parking area. The lake is less than one and a half miles (2.4 km) north of Taggart Lake. The lake was named for Frank Bradley. It has an elevation of 7,027 ft (2,142 m) and is 0.75 mi (1.21 km) long and 0.45 mi (0.72 km) wide.

Nearby Taggart Lake is located at the terminus of Avalanche Canyon. A number of hiking trails can be found near the lake including a 3 miles (4.8 km) roundtrip hike commencing from the Taggart Lake Trailhead parking area.

Taggart lake was named after William Rush Taggart, an assistant surveyor to Frank Bradley as part of the Snake River division of the Hayden expedition of 1872 to document the geology and topography of the Yellowstone area. It is a touch lower than Bradley Lake, at an elevation of 6,902 ft (2,104 m). The lake is 0.45 mi (0.72 km) long and 0.40 mi (0.64 km) wide with a maximum depth of 80 ft (24 m).

=== Phelps Lake ===
Phelps Lake was mostly included within the original park boundaries, and the remainder of the lake was incorporated with the inclusion of the Jackson Hole National Monument into the park in 1943. It is located at the entrance to Death Canyon in the southern section of the park. A number of hiking trails can be found near the lake, the most popular being a 1.8 mile (2.9 km) roundtrip hike to the Phelps Lake overlook.

The lake lies at an elevation of 6,633 ft (2,022 m), and is 1.5 mi (2.4 km) long and 0.75 mi (1.21 km) wide.

=== String Lake ===
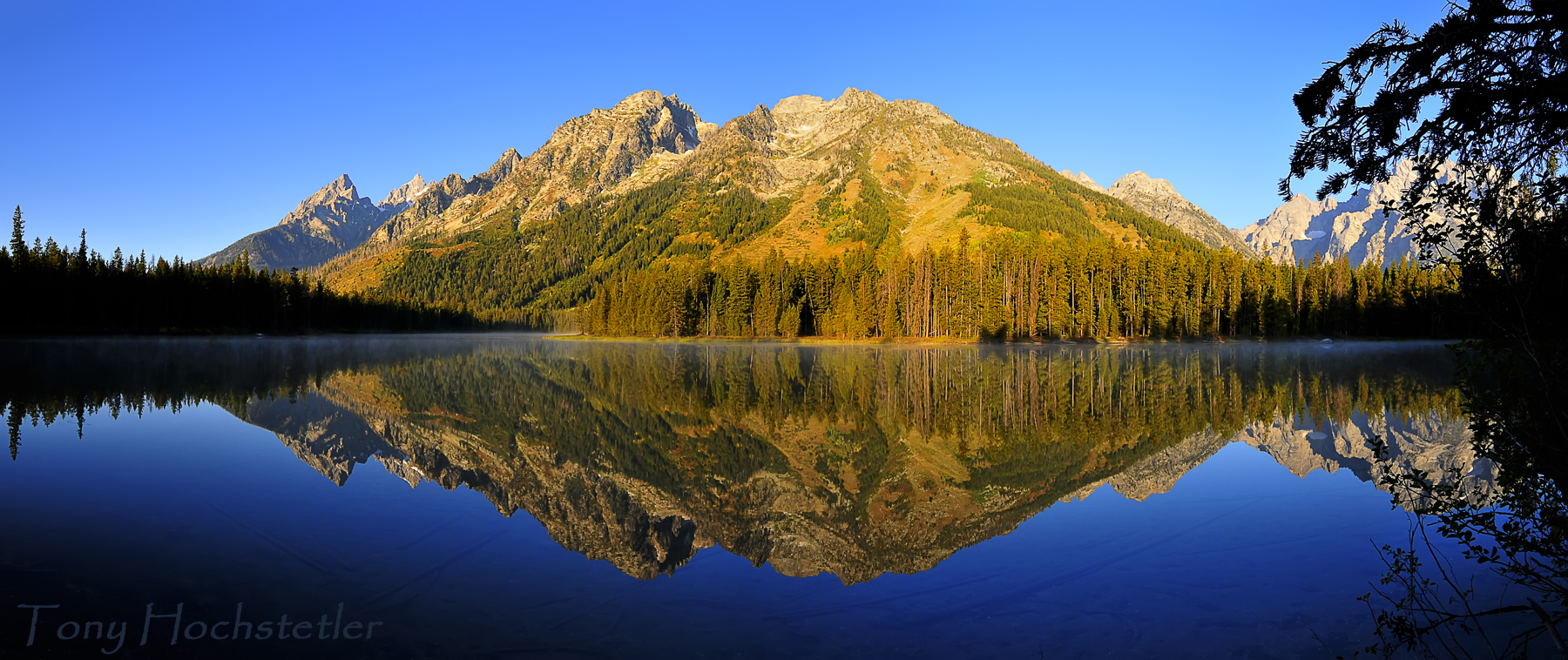
Early morning panorama of String Lake

Although not specifically named, String Lake was the sixth piedmont lake at the base of the main peaks that was included in the original 1929 park boundary.

The lake is located at the outflow of Leigh Lake. A small wetland area is on the northwest side of the lake and is prime moose habitat. A short half mile (.8 km) long creek connects String Lake to Jenny Lake to the south. The lake can easily be accessed by vehicle and a number of trails commence from the String Lake trailhead parking area.

String Lake has an elevation of 6,870 ft (2,090 m) and is 1.3 mi (2.1 km) long and 0.20 mi (0.32 km) wide.

== Other Lakes ==
Minor Named Lakes and Tarns
| Lake | Elevation | Length | Width | Depth | Coordinates |
|---|---|---|---|---|---|
| Amphitheater Lake | 9,698 ft (2,956 m) | 230 yd (210 m) | 150 yd (140 m) | | 43°43′47″N 110°46′52″W |
| Bearpaw Lake (Note: Bearpaw lake lies to the north of Leigh Lake at the eastern base of Mount Moran and snow and glacier meltwaters off Skillet Glacier eventually feed into the lake. There are three backcountry camping sites with designated tent pads at the lake and a backcountry permit is required to use these sites.) | 6,848 ft (2,087 m) | .20 mi (0.32 km) | .10 mi (0.16 km) | | 43°49′47″N 110°43′47″W |
| Cirque Lake | 9,605 ft (2,928 m) | .45 mi (0.72 km) | .30 mi (0.48 km) | | 43°49′47″N 110°50′10″W |
| Cow Lake | 6,850 ft (2,090 m) | .25 mi (0.40 km) | .10 mi (0.16 km) | | 43°49′46″N 110°33′47″W |
| Coyote Lake | 10,201 ft (3,109 m) | 200 yd (180 m) | 150 yd (140 m) | | 43°38′22″N 110°52′14″W |
| Crater Lake | 7,146 ft (2,178 m) | | | | 43°29′53″N 110°55′40″W |
| Delta Lake | 9,016 ft (2,748 m) | 250 yd (230 m) | 150 yd (140 m) | | 43°43′57″N 110°46′22″W |
| Dudley Lake | 8,243 ft (2,512 m) | | | | 43°52′48″N 110°46′54″W |
| Elk Ranch Reservoir | 6,860 ft (2,090 m) | .65 mi (1.05 km) | .25 mi (0.40 km) | | 43°48′20″N 110°28′24″W |
| Emma Matilda Lake | 6,873 ft (2,095 m) | 2.7 mi (4.3 km) | .5 mi (0.80 km) | | 43°53′11″N 110°31′58″W |
| Forget-me-not Lakes | 9,581 ft (2,920 m) | 150 yd (140 m) | 180 yd (160 m) | | 43°39′01″N 110°52′26″W |
| Grizzly Bear Lake | 9,215 ft (2,809 m) | .20 mi (0.32 km) | .15 mi (0.24 km) | | 43°48′11″N 110°48′38″W |
| Halfmoon Lake | 6,782 ft (2,067 m) | | | | 43°49′32″N 110°25′46″W |
| Hechtman Lake | 7,865 ft (2,397 m) | | | | 44°2′44″N 110°47′44″W |
| Holly Lake | 9,416 ft (2,870 m) | .13 mi (0.21 km) | .10 mi (0.16 km) | | 43°47′34″N 110°47′53″W |
| Icefloe Lake | 10,652 ft (3,247 m) | 450 yd (410 m) | 280 yd (260 m) | | 43°43′36″N 110°49′24″W |
| Indian Lake | 9,805 ft (2,989 m) | 500 yd (460 m) | 250 yd (230 m) | | 43°37′54″N 110°53′20″W |
| Kit Lake | 10,367 ft (3,160 m) | 150 yd (140 m) | 120 yd (110 m) | | 43°42′54″N 110°49′56″W |
| Lake of the Crags | 9,565 ft (2,915 m) | .30 mi (0.48 km) | .10 mi (0.16 km) | | 43°46′32″N 110°46′13″W |
| Lake Solitude | 9,565 ft (2,915 m) | .30 mi (0.48 km) | .25 mi (0.40 km) | | 43°47′33″N 110°50′41″W |
| Lake Taminah | 9,055 ft (2,760 m) | .30 mi (0.48 km) | .10 mi (0.16 km) | | 43°42′28″N 110°48′23″W |
| Laurel Lake | 7,510 ft (2,290 m) | 150 yd (140 m) | 100 yd (91 m) | | 43°46′54″N 110°44′31″W |
| Marion Lake | 9,239 ft (2,816 m) | 250 yd (230 m) | 100 yd (91 m) | | 43°37′25″N 110°55′45″W |
| Mica Lake | 9,564 ft (2,915 m) | .15 mi (0.24 km) | .10 mi (0.16 km) | | 43°47′01″N 110°50′39″W |
| Mink Lake | 8,880 ft (2,710 m) | .25 mi (0.40 km) | .10 mi (0.16 km) | | 43°48′38″N 110°50′45″W |
| Moran Lake | 6,769 ft (2,063 m) | | | | 43°51′51″N 110°45′4″W |
| Ortenburger Lake (not official) (Note: The proposed name, submitted to the U.S. Board in 1994, would honor Leigh N. Ortenburger, a local climbing authority. The name was approved by the Wyoming Board of Geographic Names, but not approved by the U.S. Board, citing its Wilderness Naming Policy) | 9,603 ft (2,927 m) | | | | 43°52′30″N 110°50′44″W |
| Pass Lake | 9,512 ft (2,899 m) | | | | 43°38′36″N 110°54′9″W |
| Ramshead Lake | 9,524 ft (2,903 m) | 375 ft (114 m) | 300 ft (91 m) | | 43°46′35″N 110°45′48″W |
| Rimrock Lake | 9,916 ft (3,022 m) | 400 yd (370 m) | 200 yd (180 m) | | 43°39′19″N 110°50′44″W |
| Ski Lake | 8,655 ft (2,638 m) | | | | 43°31′31″N 110°55′56″W |
| Snowdrift Lake | 10,006 ft (3,050 m) | .50 mi (0.80 km) | .20 mi (0.32 km) | | 43°42′31″N 110°49′38″W |
| Surprise Lake | 9,570 ft (2,920 m) | 100 yd (91 m) | 100 yd (91 m) | | 43°43′43″N 110°46′39″W |
| Swan Lake | 6,802 ft (2,073 m) | | | | 43°53′25″N 110°38′3″W |
| Talus Lake | 9,653 ft (2,942 m) | | | | 43°54′01″N 110°48′13″W |
| Timberline Lake | 10,312 ft (3,143 m) | 100 yd (91 m) | 100 yd (91 m) | | 43°41′11″N 110°48′44″W |
| Trapper Lake | 6,919 ft (2,109 m) | 200 yd (180 m) | 100 yd (91 m) | | 43°49′59″N 110°43′57″W |
| Two Ocean Lake | 6,896 ft (2,102 m) | 2.8 mi (4.5 km) | .45 mi (0.72 km) | | 43°54′34″N 110°31′25″W |

== Greater Lake District named lakes ==
=== Amphitheater Lake ===
Amphitheater Lake is only 0.20 miles (0.32 km) west of Surprise Lake and can be accessed via a strenuous climb of just under 10 miles (16 km) round trip from the Lupine Meadows trailhead. Disappointment Peak is .50 miles (0.80 km) WNW of the lake.

=== Bearpaw Lake ===
Bearpaw Lake lies to the north of Leigh Lake at the eastern base of Mount Moran and snow and glacier meltwaters off Skillet Glacier eventually feed into the lake. There are three backcountry camping sites with designated tent pads at the lake and a backcountry permit is required to use these sites.

Bearpaw Lake lies at an elevation of 6,848 ft (2,087 m) and is 0.20 mi (0.32 km) long and 0.10 mi (0.16 km) across.

=== Delta Lake ===
The lake is the source of the Glacier Gulch Creek. It has become a popular day hiking destination due to its attractive aspect below the Grand Teton. An unofficial trail leads hikers up a boulder field from the Amphitheater Lake Trail to the lake.

=== Dudley Lake ===
The lake was discovered in 1932 by park ranger Dudley Hayden. Following his death in 1969, the Jackson Hole Historical Society passed a resolution to rename Hanging Lake to Dudley Lake in his honor. Support for the name change came from then Governor Stan Hathaway, US Senators Gale McGee and Clifford Hansen, and US Congressman John S. Wold. The lake was officially renamed Dudley Lake by the Department of the Interior in 1970. (Note: Renamed in decision list 7004 by the US Board of Geographic Names)

=== Forget-me-not Lakes ===
The Forget-me-not Lakes are a high elevation ecosystem located.The ecosystem is located 8.8 miles (14.2 km) from Moose Wilson Road, in Teton County, and situated 1 mile (1.6 km) west of Rimrock Lake and Prospectors Mountain. The lakes consist of several small bodies of water, the largest 150 yd (140 m) long and 180 yd (160 m) wide. Death Creek has 24 tributary streams, several of which originate from Death Shelf springs; two tributaries originate from Forget-Me-Not Lakes, elevation 9,600 feet (2,900 m) and Rimrock Lake 9,915 feet (3,022 m) and are located in a remote area near the head of Death Canyon on the slopes of Prospectors Mountain.

Backpacker magazine has referred to the Forget-me-not Lakes as a romantic place known for the abundance of wildflowers in the Spring and listed them as one of the recommended backcountry lakes worth a visit in Grand Teton National Park.

=== Lake Taminah ===
Lake Taminah is found within the Avalanche Canyon. It is the source of the North Fork of Taggart Creek. It outflows into Shoshoko Falls.

=== Timberline Lake ===
Timberline Lake sits at the head of Stewart's Draw, in the cirque separating Buck Mountain and Static Peak. An unmaintained trail leads from the area of the Death Canyon trailhead to the lake. It is mostly visited by climbers attempting Buck Mountain's East Ridge or East Face.

=== Trapper Lake ===
Accessible from the Leigh Lake Trailhead, this lake lies at an elevation of 6,919 ft (2,109 m) and is 200 yd (180 m) by 100 yd (91 m) across.

== See also ==
- Grand Teton National Park
- List of national parks of the United States
- List of lakes of Wyoming

== Sources ==
- Crockett, Stephanie (July 24, 2004). "The Prehistoric Peoples of Jackson Hole". A Place Called Jackson Hole. Grand Teton Natural History Association. Archived from the original on November 12, 2012.
- Crockett, Stephanie (July 24, 2004). "The Early Archaic (8,000 to 5,000 BCE)". A Place Called Jackson Hole. Grand Teton Natural History Association. Archived from the original on January 30, 2011.
- Gannett, Henry (1905). The Origin of Certain Place Names in the United States. Govt. Print. Off. pp. 169.
- "Geographic Names Information System (GNIS) | U.S. Geological Survey". www.usgs.gov.
- "Historical Society Plans Koops Visit". The Jackson Hole Guide. 23 July 1970. p. 1.
- Keller, Lynn (2010). "Geologic Features and Processes" (PDF). Grand Teton National Park and John D. Rockefeller Jr. Memorial Parkway Geologic Resources Inventory Report. National Park Service. p. 19. Archived from the original (PDF) on September 23, 2012.
- Kiver, Eugene P. (1999). Geology of U.S. parklands (5th ed.). New York: J. Wiley. ISBN 978-0471332183.
- Larsen, Darren J.; Finkenbinder, Matthew S.; Abbott, Mark B.; Ofstun, Adam R. (15 April 2016). "Deglaciation and postglacial environmental changes in the Teton Mountain Range recorded at Jenny Lake, Grand Teton National Park, WY". Quaternary Science Reviews. 138: 62–75. Bibcode:2016QSRv..138...62L. doi:10.1016/j.quascirev.2016.02.024. ISSN 0277-3791.
- Lomax, Becky (July 6, 2010). Yellowstone & Grand Teton Camping. Avalon Travel Publishing. pp. 65. ISBN 978-1-59880-577-2.
- Mayhew, Bradley; Carolyn McCarthy (2008). Yellowstone & Grand Teton National Parks. Lonely Planet. p. 40. ISBN 978-1-74104-560-4.
- Mishev, Geraldine (2015). "Top Five Lakes in Grand Teton National Park". Travel + Leisure.
- McGee, Diane (2010). "Aquatic Nuisance Species" (PDF). Grand Teton National Park. Archived from the original (PDF) on April 17, 2012.
- "piedmont | National Geographic Society". education.nationalgeographic.org. 2014.
- "Grand Teton NP: A Place Called Jackson Hole (Chapter 4)". National Park Service. 2004.
- "Day Hikes" (PDF). National Park Service. March 2010. Archived from the original (PDF) on November 8, 2012.
- "Floating the Snake River" (PDF). National Park Service. March 2010. Archived from the original (PDF) on November 8, 2012.
- "Lakes and Ponds". Natural Features and Ecosystems. National Park Service. December 7, 2011. Archived from the original on November 8, 2012.
- "Floating the Snake River" (PDF). National Park Service. March 2011. Archived from the original (PDF) on May 22, 2012.
- "Fishing 2011" (PDF). National Park Service. March 2011. Archived from the original (PDF) on February 28, 2013.
- "Boating" (PDF). National Park Service. February 2012. Archived from the original (PDF) on June 21, 2012.
- "Aquatic Nuisance Species-Free Certification" (PDF). National Park Service. Archived from the original (PDF) on April 9, 2012.
- "Day Hikes" (PDF). Plan Your Visit. National Park Service. 2010. Archived from the original (pdf) on May 28, 2010.
- "Boating and Floating". Plan Your Visit. National Park Service. March 22, 2012. Archived from the original on March 27, 2012.
- "Park Statistics". Park Management. National Park Service. December 20, 2011. Archived from the original on November 8, 2012.
- "Backcountry Camping" (PDF). National Park Service. 2018.
- "Cultural History - Grand Teton National Park (U.S. National Park Service)". www.nps.gov. 2019.
- "Geologic Activity - Grand Teton National Park (U.S. National Park Service)". www.nps.gov. 2020.
- "Jenny Lake - Grand Teton National Park (U.S. National Park Service)". www.nps.gov. 2021.
- "Leigh Lake Trailhead" (PDF). National Park Service. Archived from the original (PDF) on August 9, 2012.
- "Wyoming Surface Water Classification List" (PDF). June 21, 2001.
- Ortenburger, Leigh; Reynold Jackson (November 1, 1996). A Climbers Guide to the Teton Range. Mountaineers Books. p. 192. ISBN 978-0-89886-480-9.
- Ortenburger, Leigh; Jackson, Reynold (1996). A Climber's Guide to the Teton Range. Mountaineers. ISBN 9780898864809.
- Pearlman, Michael (2006-10-18). "Cold water no problem for lakes swimmer". Jackson Hole News&Guide.
- Porter, S. C.; Pierce, Kenneth L.; Hamilton, T. D. (1983). "Late Wisconsin mountain glaciation in the western United States". In Wright, HE; Porter, SC (eds.). Late-Quaternary environments of the United States. Vol. 1. University of Minnesota Press. ISBN 978-0-8166-1252-9.
- Rennicke, Jeff (June 1994). Great Lakes A selection of North America's finest watering holes. Vol. 23. Backpacker. p. 48.
- Rennicke, Jeff (August 1995). The Rapture of the Wild. Vol. 23. Backpacker. p. 51.
- Rhea, Darren T.; et al. (February 2005). "Polycyclic Aromatic Hydrocarbons in Water, Sediment and Snow, from Lakes in Grand Teton National Park, Wyoming" (PDF). United States Geological Survey. Archived from the original (PDF) on 2012-04-25.
- Smith, Bruce (1996). "Migratory Behavior of the Jackson Elk Herd" (PDF). National Park Service. Archived from the original (PDF) on January 23, 2012.
- Smith, Robert Baer (2000). Windows into the earth : the geologic story of Yellowstone and Grand Teton National Parks. Oxford: Oxford University Press. ISBN 0195105966.
- Schneider, Bill (2005). Hiking Grand Teton National Park (2nd ed.). Falcon Guides. p. 155. ISBN 978-0-7627-2567-0.
- Coyote Lake Topo Map in Teton County WY (Map). Topozone (USGS Quads).
- "Elevation gradients in aquatic invertebrate assemblages:Gathering baseline information in Grand Teton National Park's high elevation streams and lakes" (PDF). Wyoming Natural Diversity Database, University of Wyoming. 2014. p. 5.
- "Jackson Lake Dam". U.S. Bureau of Reclamation. July 13, 2009. Archived from the original on October 6, 2012.
