= Avalanche Canyon =

Canyon in the state of Wyoming

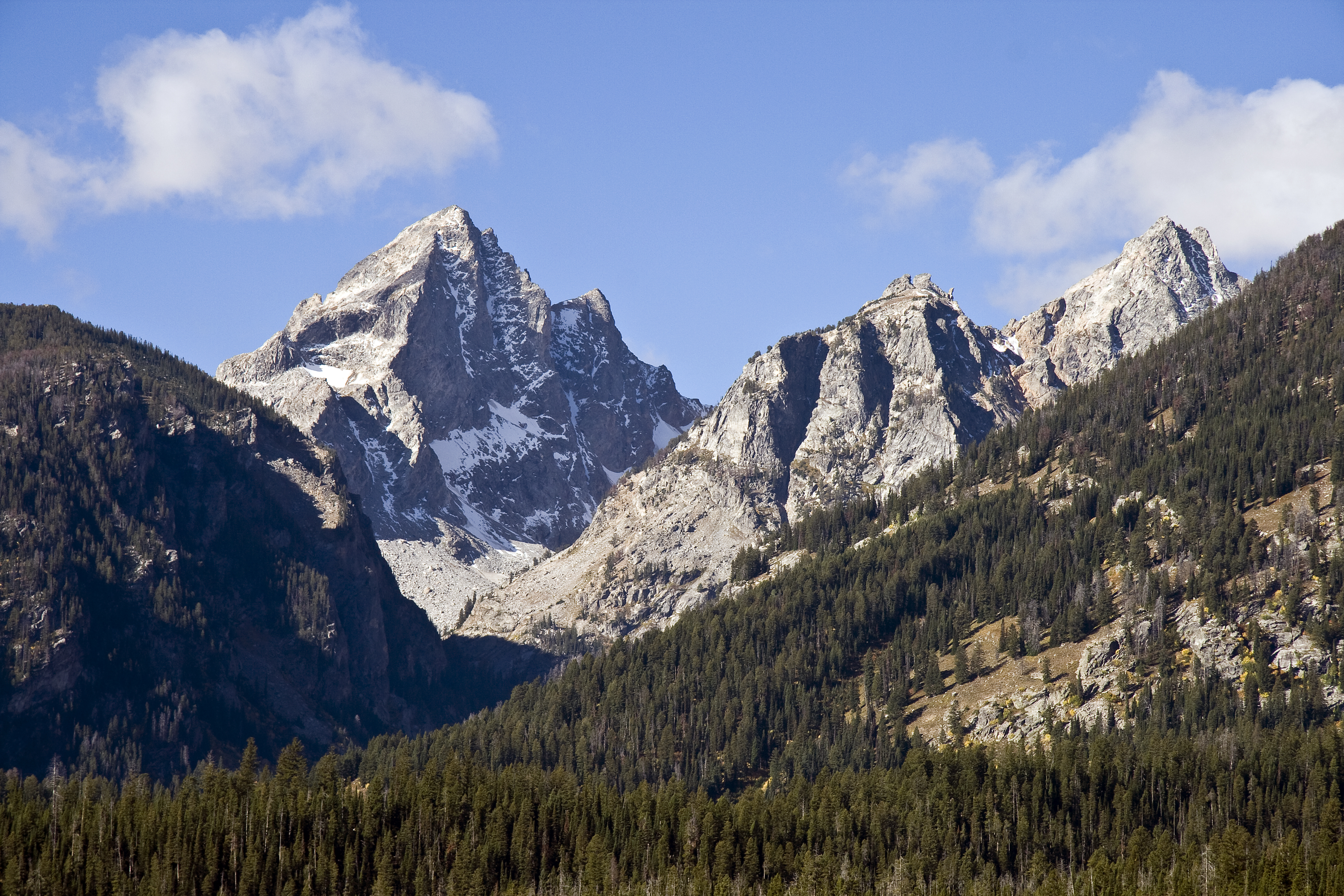
- Avalanche Canyon and Buck Mountain in background

Geography
- Country: United States
- State: Wyoming
- County: Teton
- Coordinates: 43.7069°N 110.765°W
- Interactive map of Avalanche Canyon

Avalanche Canyon is located in Grand Teton National Park, in the U.S. state of Wyoming. The canyon was formed by glaciers which retreated at the end of the Last Glacial Maximum approximately 15,000 years ago, leaving behind a U-shaped valley. To the north of Avalanche Canyon lies South Teton, Cloudveil Dome and Nez Perce Peak while to the southwest lie Mount Wister and Veiled Peak. Snowdrift Lake, Lake Taminah, and Shoshoko Falls are situated at the head of the canyon.

== See also ==
- Canyons of the Teton Range
- Geology of the Grand Teton area
