= Delta Lake (Teton County, Wyoming) =

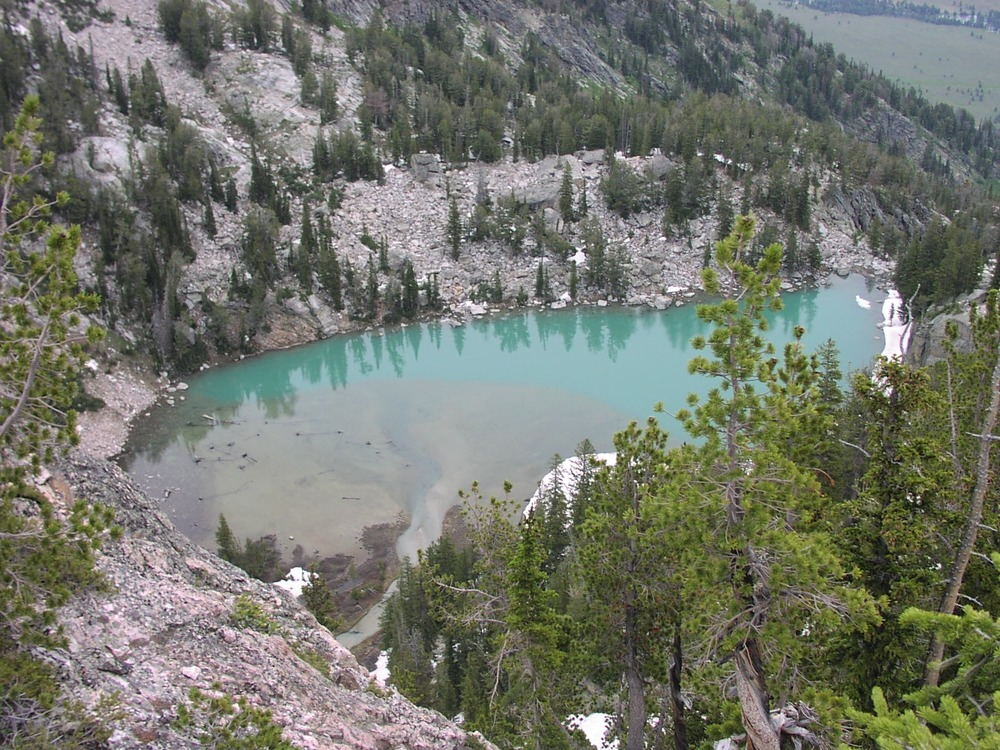
- Delta Lake Grand Teton NP

- Location within Wyoming Location within the United States
- Location: Grand Teton National Park, Teton County, Wyoming, US
- Coordinates: 43°43′57″N 110°46′22″W
- Lake type: Glacial Lake
- Primary inflows: Glacier Gulch
- Primary outflows: Glacier Gulch
- Basin countries: United States
- Max. length: 250 yd (230 m)
- Max. width: 150 yd (140 m)
- Surface elevation: 9,016 ft (2,748 m)

Delta Lake is located in Grand Teton National Park, in the U.S. state of Wyoming. Delta Lake is situated in Glacier Gulch and is fed rock flour (glacial silt) from the Teton Glacier, which turns the water turquoise in appearance. It has been an increasingly popular hiking destination in the park, with the number of hikers increasing 164% from 2016 to 2018. The easiest walk to the lake is by way of a hike commencing from the Lupine Meadows trailhead. Following the trail to Surprise and Amphitheater Lakes and an off trail effort to the north from Surprise Lake provides access to Delta Lake. The effort is considered strenuous as getting to Surprise Lake is nearly a ten mile roundtrip with over 3,000 feet (910 m) of elevation gain. Below Delta Lake lies Glacier Falls, an intermittent 300-foot (91 m) waterfall.

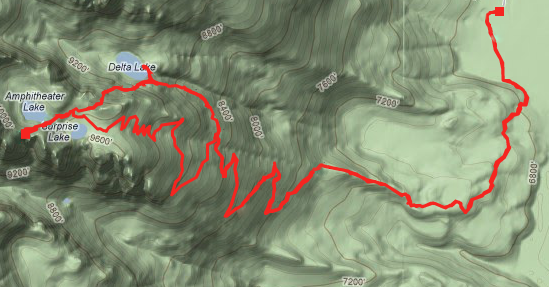
Trail to Delta Lake

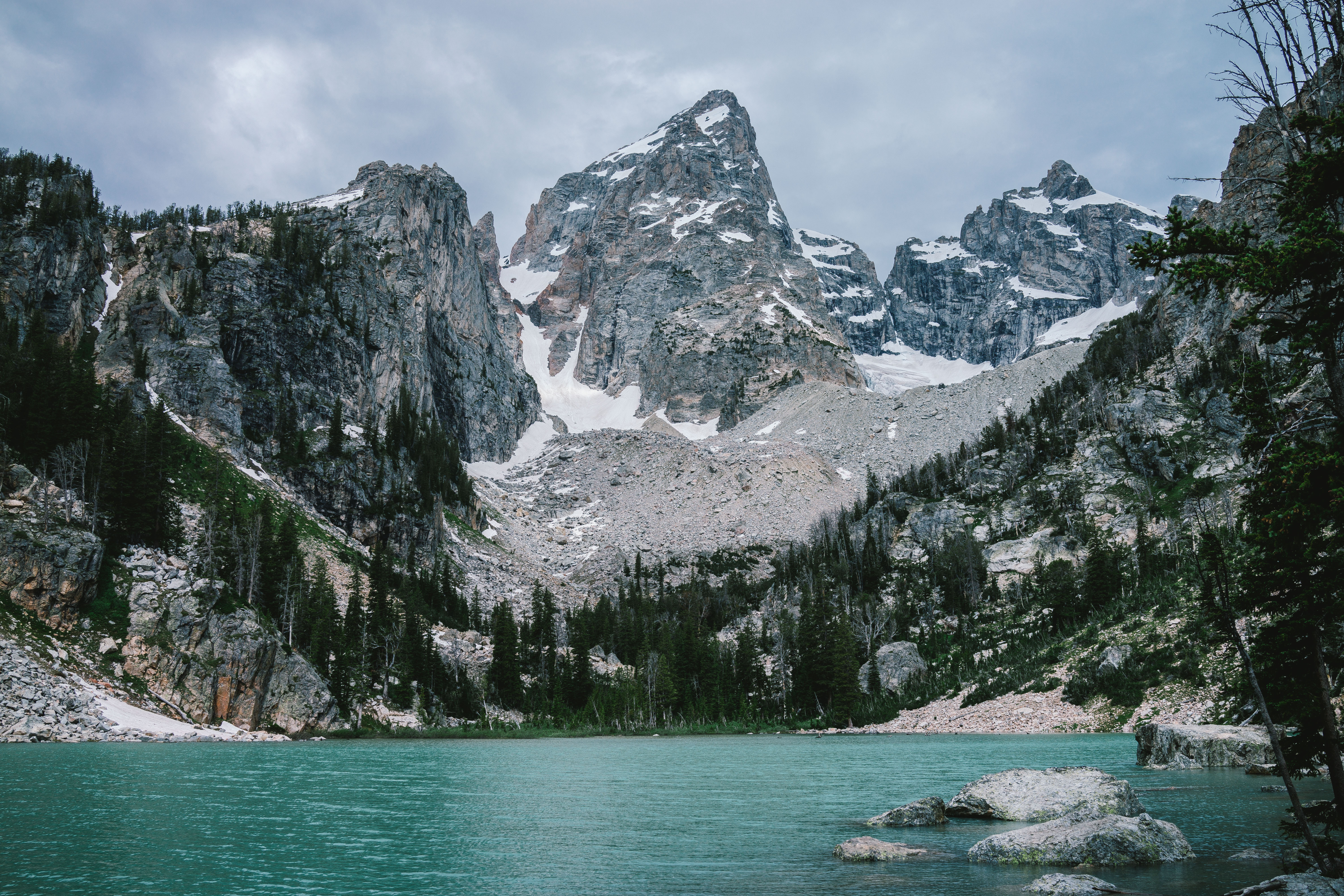
The mountain behind Delta Lake
