= Shoshoko Falls =

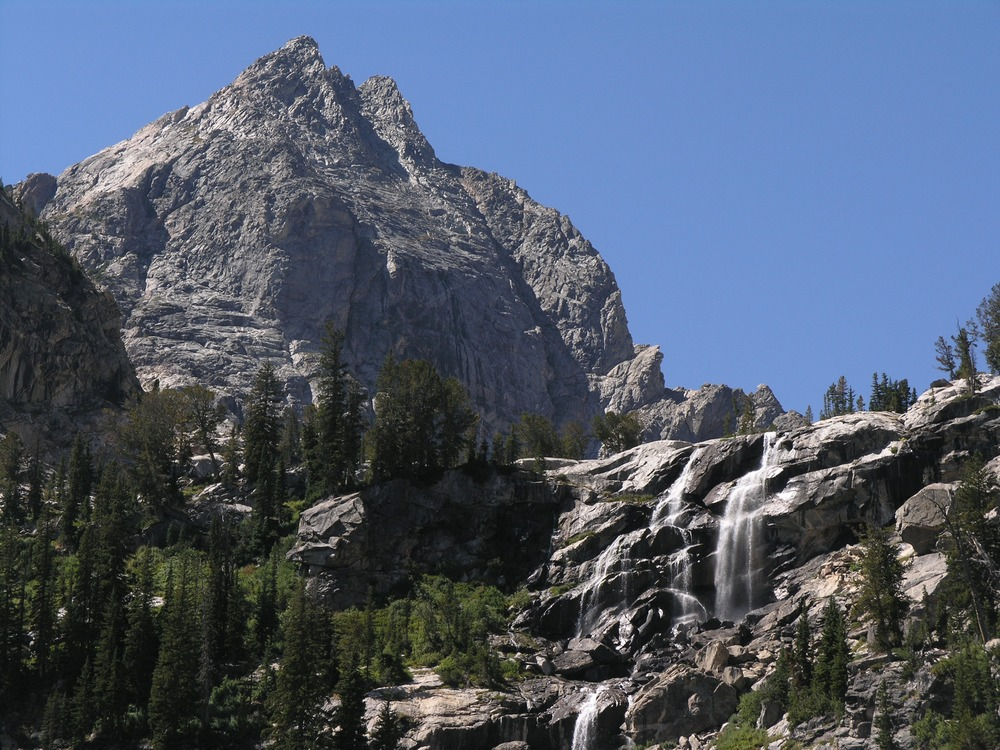
- Shoshoko Falls along with Mount Wister

- Location within Wyoming
- Location: Grand Teton National Park, United States
- Coordinates: 43.708148°N 110.802495°W
- Type: Cascade
- Total height: 200 feet (61 m)
- Watercourse: Taggart Creek

Shoshoko Falls is a cascade located in Avalanche Canyon, Grand Teton National Park in the U.S. state of Wyoming. The cascade drops over 200 feet (61 m) and is intermittent, fed by runoff from snowmelt, and is near the outlet of Taggart Creek from Lake Taminah.
