= Veiled Peak =

Mountain in the state of Wyoming

- Location within Wyoming Location within the United States

Highest point
- Elevation: 11,335 ft (3,455 m)
- Prominence: 450 ft (140 m)
- Coordinates: 43°42′03″N 110°49′34″W

Geography
- Location: Grand Teton National Park, Teton County, Wyoming, U.S.
- Parent range: Teton Range
- Topo map: USGS Grand Teton

Climbing
- Easiest route: Scramble

Veiled Peak (11,335 feet (3,455 m)) is located in the Teton Range, within Grand Teton National Park, U.S. state of Wyoming. Veiled Peak is west of Mount Wister and rises to the south above Snowdrift Lake.
