= Ocean Lake =

Lake in Wyoming, United States

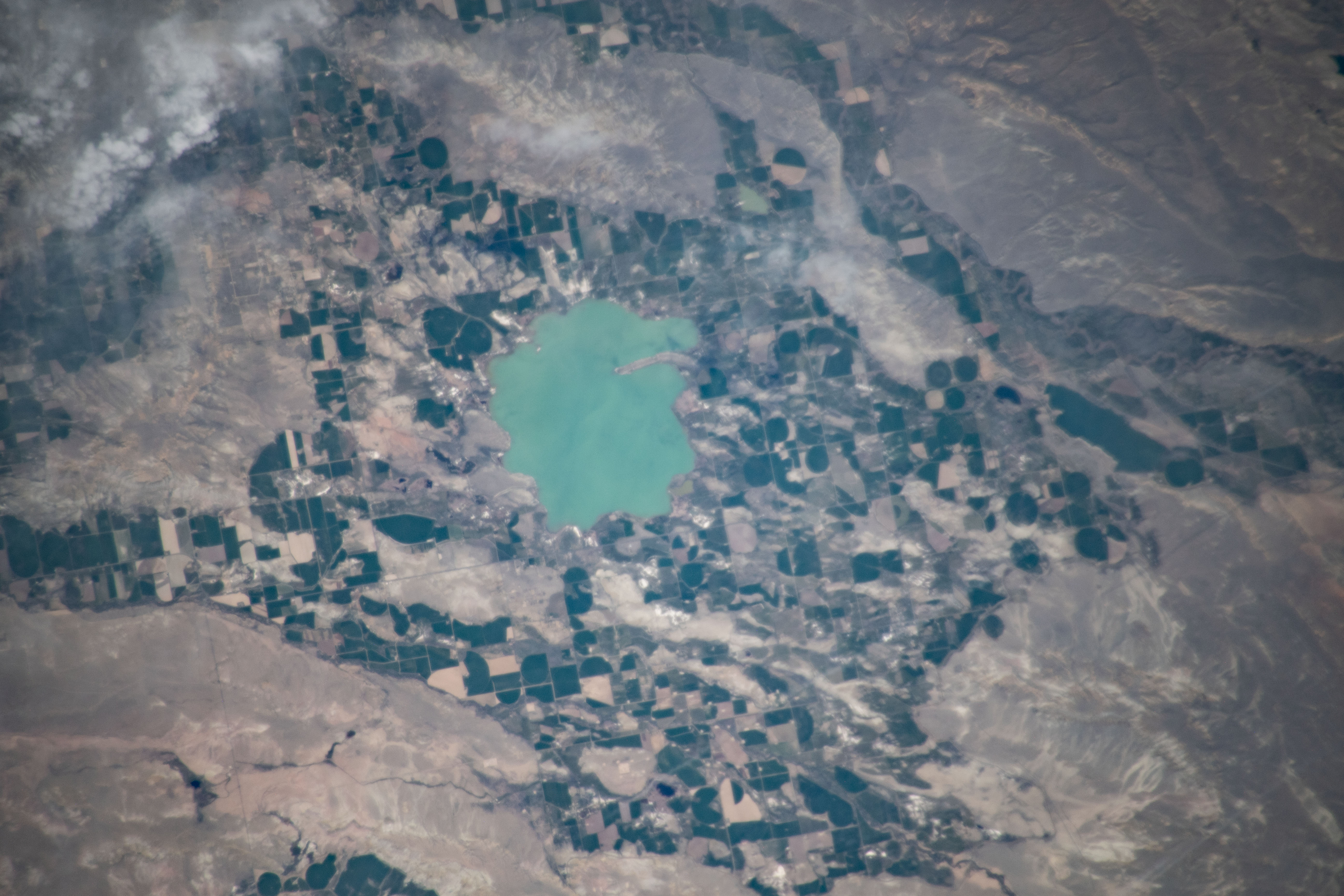

- Location within Wyoming Location within the United States
- Location: Ocean Lake Wildlife Habitat Management Area, Fremont County, Wyoming, US
- Coordinates: 43°11′04″N 108°36′02″W
- Type: Glacial Lake
- Basin countries: United States
- Max. length: 3 mi (4.8 km)
- Max. width: 5 mi (8.0 km)
- Surface elevation: 5,236 ft (1,596 m)

Ocean Lake is located in the U. S. state of Wyoming about 17 miles northwest of Riverton. Ocean Lake resides within the 11,505 acres (4,656 ha) Ocean Lake Wildlife Habitat Management Area. It is an essential breeding ground for thousands of migratory waterfowl. Efforts have been made to enhance wildlife in the area with the construction of man-made ponds and nests.

== See also ==
- List of lakes of Wyoming
- Two Ocean Lake
