= Delta Lake =

Delta Lake may refer to:

- Delta Lake (software), a concept in computer databases
- Delta Lake (Teton County, Wyoming) in Grand Teton National Park
- Delta Reservoir, a reservoir in New York also known as Delta Lake
- Delta Lake State Park in New York
