= Cascade Creek (Grand Teton National Park) =

River in Wyoming, United States

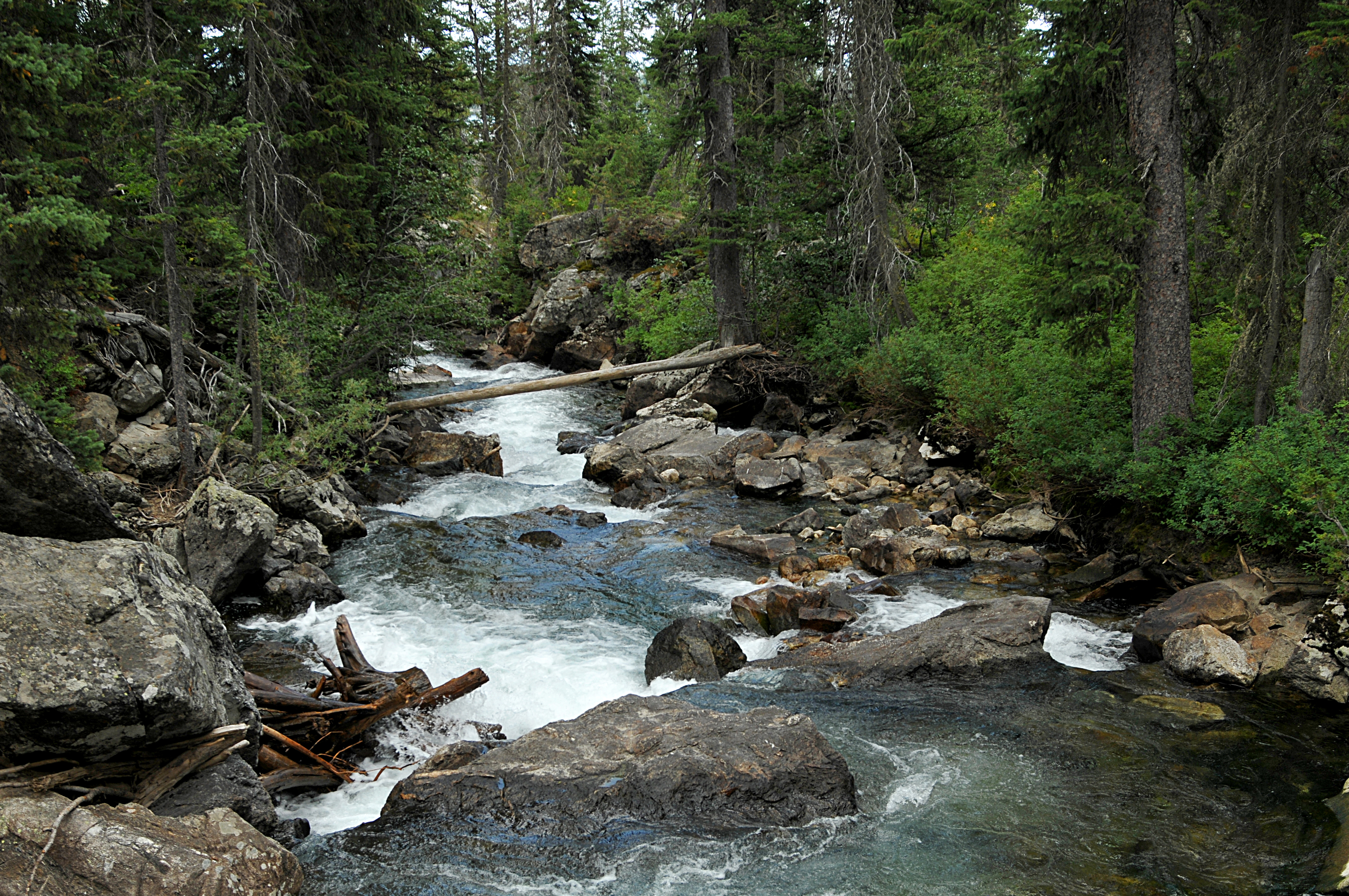

Location
- Country: US

Physical characteristics
- Source
  - location: Lake Solitude
  - coordinates: 43°45′55″N 110°44′29″W
  - elevation: 9,035 ft (2,754 m)
- Mouth
  - location: Jenny Lake
  - coordinates: 43°47′27″N 110°50′33″W
  - elevation: 6,783 ft (2,067 m)

Cascade Creek is a stream located entirely within Grand Teton National Park in the US state of Wyoming. The stream flows from Lake Solitude to Jenny Lake, a distance of approximately 8 miles (13 km). A few miles from its source, Cascade Creek receives water from the South Fork Cascade Creek, doubling its flow. From there, Cascade Creek flows the length of Cascade Canyon and shortly before discharging into Jenny Lake, drops 100 feet (30 m) over Hidden Falls.

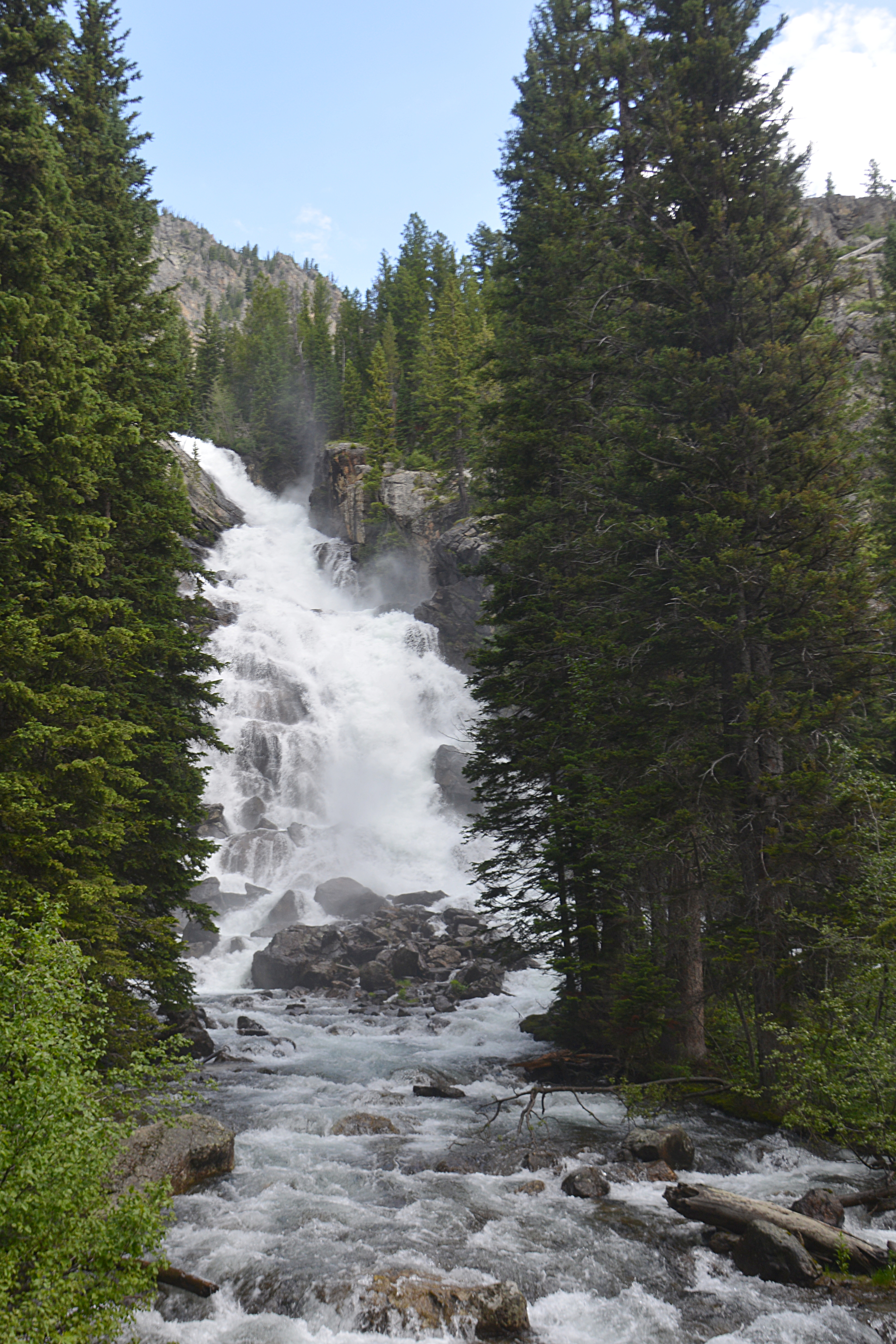
Cascade Creek at Hidden Falls, Grand Teton National Park, WY.
