= Teton Fault =

Geological fault in Wyoming

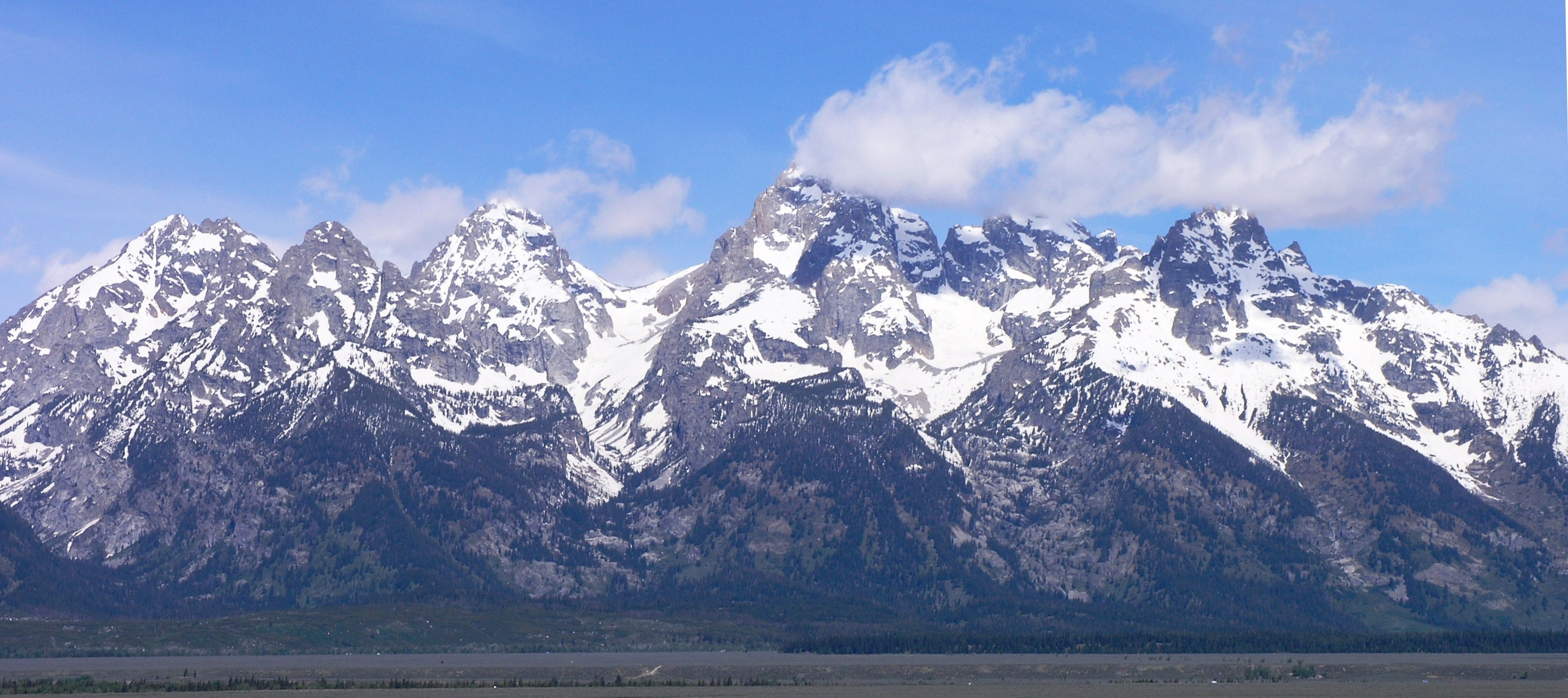
East face of the Teton Range. The Teton fault is located at the base of these mountains.

The Teton fault is a normal fault located in northwestern Wyoming. The fault has a length of 44 miles (70 km) and runs along the eastern base of the Teton Range. Vertical movement on the fault has caused the dramatic topography of the Teton Range.

== Geologic setting ==
The Teton fault is located in a unique geologic setting. The fault is on the boundary of four major geologic provinces: the Basin and Range, Idaho-Wyoming Thrust belt, Rocky Mountain Foreland, and the Yellowstone volcanic plateau. The Basin and Range province is a region of east–west crustal extension. This province adds tension perpendicular to the fault line causing the fault blocks to move apart. The Idaho-Wyoming Thrust belt is located south of the Teton fault and is a region of thick and deformed crust that prevents the fault from extending farther south. The Rocky Mountain Foreland is located east of the Teton fault and is a region of thicker crust. This section of crust is heavier and adds to the vertical downward force on the hanging wall of fault. The Yellowstone volcanic plateau is a region of uplift and expansion that influences both vertical and horizontal forces on the Teton fault.

The Teton fault is unique in that it dips or slopes to the east. The majority of major faults in the Basin and Range province dip to the west. The unique dip of the Teton fault can be explained by the subsidence of the Snake River Plain. The Snake River Plain is located to the west of the Teton fault and was formed by the migration of the Yellowstone hotspot forming prehistoric calderas across southern Idaho. As this section of crust cools it tends to subside causing the footwall of the fault to tilt down toward the west.

The Teton fault is also an important feature in a larger region of seismic activity called the Intermountain Seismic Belt. This region extends from western Montana south to northern Arizona.

== Geologic history ==
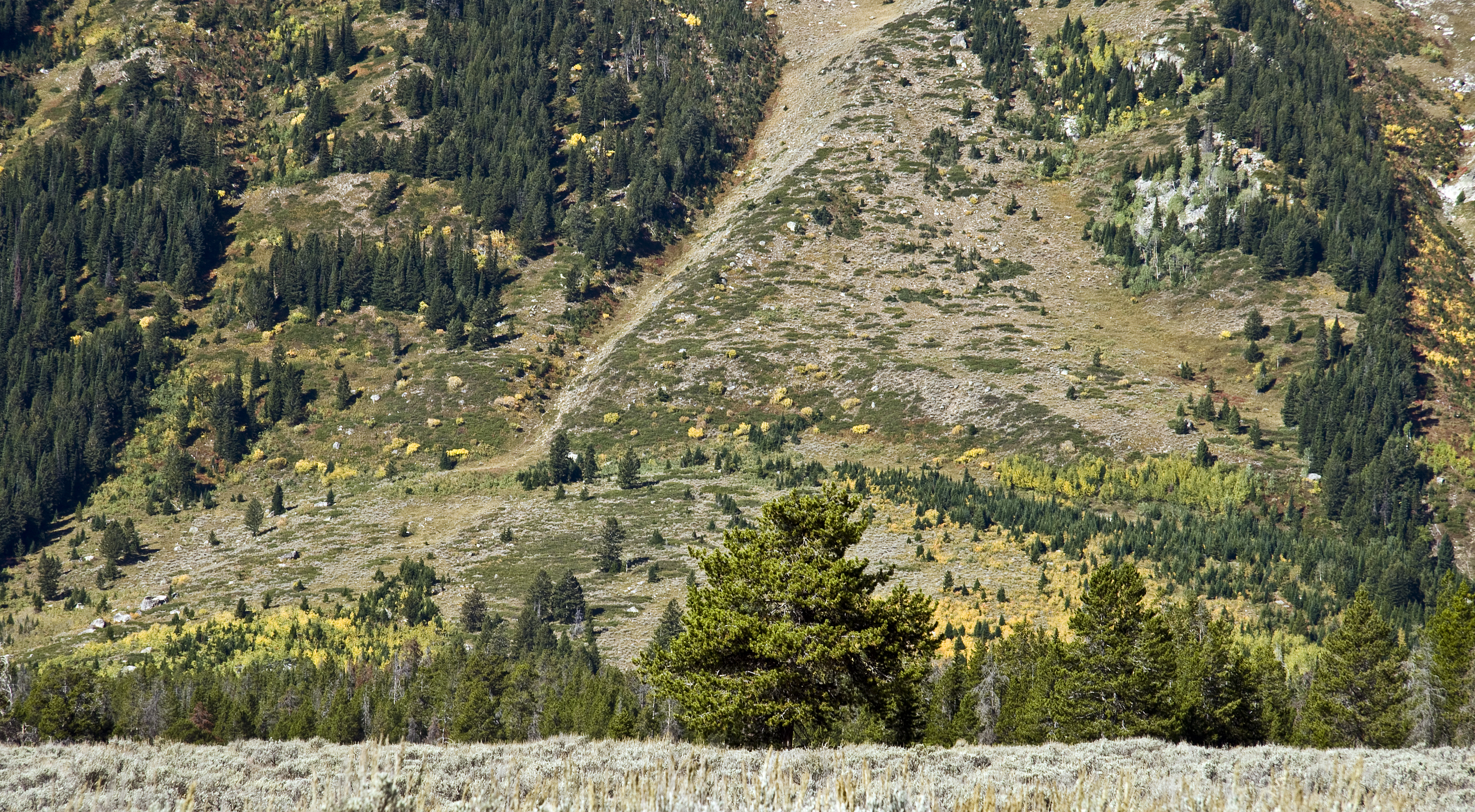
The visible trace of the Teton Fault at the base of Rockchuck Peak at String Lake

The development of the Teton fault has been influenced by many past geologic events. In the Precambrian, extensive plutonism caused metamorphism and deformation of the region that would become the Teton Range. During the Mesozoic and early Tertiary, the region underwent compression and crustal thickening. This formed thrust faults and folds. In the Late Tertiary, compressional forces ceased and extensional forces began. This led to the development of the Basin and Range province beginning 20–17 million years ago. The age of the Teton fault is somewhat controversial. Most estimates range between 2 and 13 million years old with a consensus that most of the movement on the fault occurred within the last 2 million years. Rates of movement on the fault have changed throughout time. At the end of the Pinedale glaciation 16,000 to 14,000 years ago, slip on the fault increased. This was likely due to changing stresses on the fault as glaciers melted.

The largest known earthquakes on the fault in recent history occurred around 4800 and 8000 years ago. The long intervals between large earthquakes on the fault are consistent with other normal faults in the Intermountain Seismic Belt.

== Fault movement ==
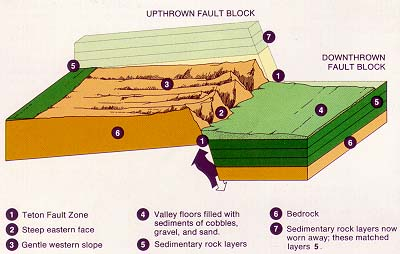
Representation of the Teton fault block. Uplift and erosion of the footwall has resulted in the Teton Range

The Teton fault is a normal fault. Therefore, movement on the fault is primarily in a vertical direction. Movement on the Teton fault occurs on a plane that averages a strike of N10°E and dips 45° to 75° to the east. The 44 mile length of the fault is broken into three segments. These segments may move separately or with other segments. The southern segment extends from the town of Wilson, Wyoming north to Taggart Lake. The middle segment extends from Taggart Lake to the south end of Jackson Lake. The northern segment extends to the north end of Jackson Lake.

The Teton fault is somewhat unusual in the amount of movement that has occurred over a relatively short amount of time. The amount of movement on the fault over its lifetime has been estimated to range from about 20,000 to 30,000 feet (6–9 km). Some evidence suggests total displacement on the fault may be as high as 36,000 feet (11 km). The average rate of movement on the fault for the late Quaternary is about 1.3 millimeters per year.

== Earthquake hazard ==
The earthquake hazard in the Teton-Yellowstone region is the highest in the intermountain west. Large earthquakes of magnitude 6.5 to 7.0 are estimated to occur in this region roughly every 200 years. However, the Teton fault contributes very little in the way of seismic activity as large earthquakes on the fault occur every 1600 to 6000 years. Most large earthquakes in the region are associated with the Yellowstone caldera and other faults in the area. In a study conducted from 1986 to 2002, it was found that the Teton fault had very little seismic activity. Despite its lack of recent seismic activity, it is believed that the Teton fault could produce a 7.5 magnitude earthquake. An earthquake this large would cause severe ground shaking and potential liquefaction in the valley of Jackson Hole. This would damage or destroy infrastructure and buildings not built to seismic standards. An earthquake could cause the valley of Jackson Hole to tilt slightly to the west altering stream and river channels as well as changing groundwater levels. This could cause flooding in some low-lying areas. A large earthquake would also have the potential to trigger other hazards such as landslides, rockslides and avalanches.
