= Beaver Dick =

American mountaineer and explorer

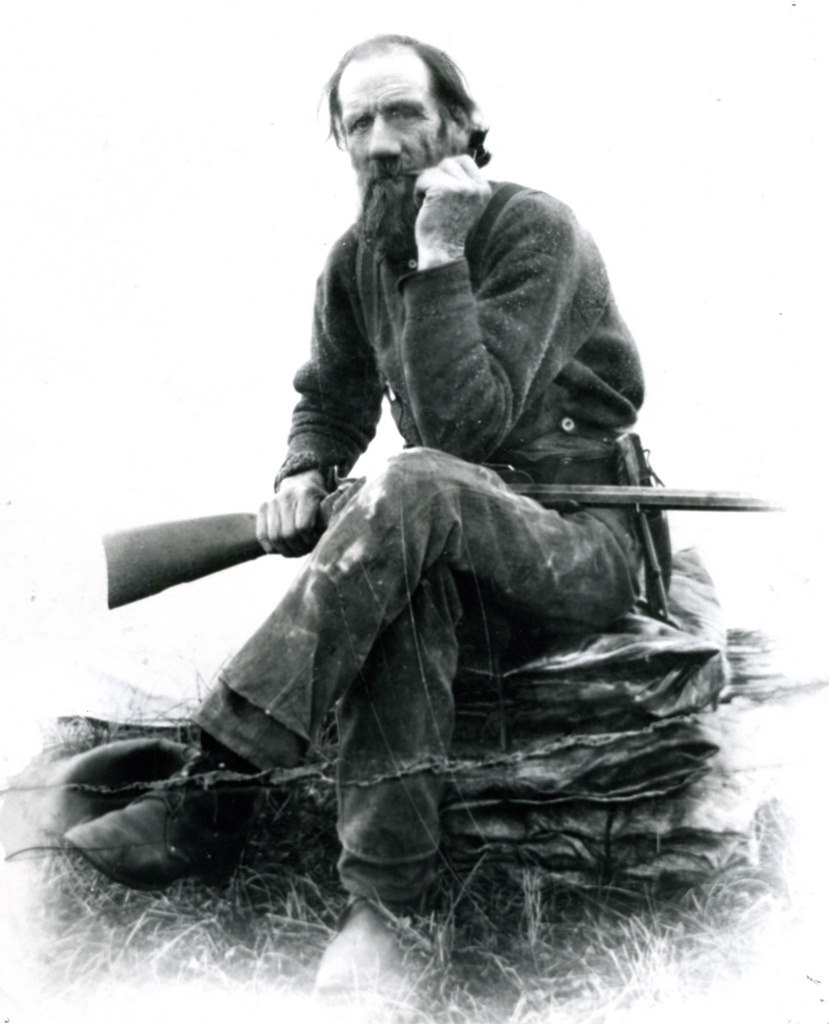
Photograph of Beaver Dick

Richard "Beaver Dick" Leigh (9 January 1831, Manchester – 29 March 1899, Wilford, Idaho) was an English-American trapper, scout, and guide at the end of the 19th century, primarily in the area now known as Jackson Hole, Wyoming, United States. He has been called "possibly the West's last mountain man." He was the guide for F. V. Hayden's survey of the Teton Range in 1872. Leigh Lake was named for Richard Leigh, and nearby Jenny Lake for his first wife, by Hayden's expedition. He corresponded frequently with his longtime friend, Charles B. Penrose, leaving behind diaries and letters that provide a personal, historical, and geographical documentation of the area. He was mentioned by Theodore Roosevelt in 1892, as a local hunter around Two Ocean Pass. His moniker "Beaver Dick" was reportedly given to him by Brigham Young as a tribute to his trapping skills. In 1964, Beaver Dick Park was established near Rexburg, Idaho. Despite what the New York Times reported, it has never been an Idaho State Park.

== Life ==
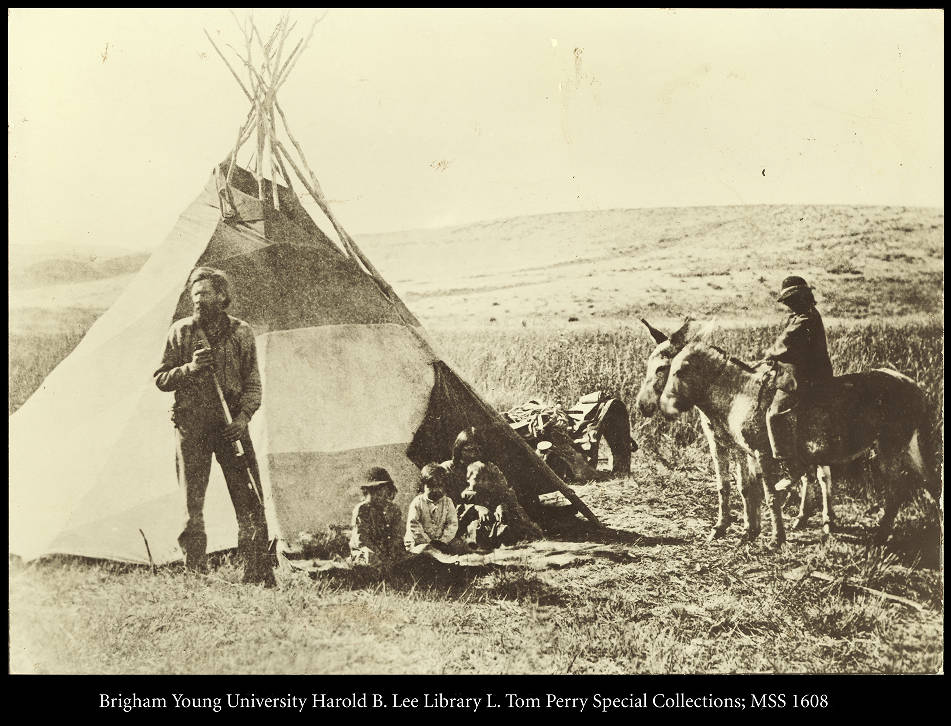
Photograph of Richard "Beaver Dick" Leigh and his family

Born in Manchester, England in 1831, Leigh emigrated to the United States with his family at the age of 7. He briefly lived in Philadelphia and Pennsylvania before joining the Hudson Bay Company in Canada, where he became a fur trapper in the northwestern territories. He then fought in the Mexican-American War. Following the war, Leigh settled in the Salt Lake Valley and later the Snake River Valley, continuing his trapping pursuits. In 1863, Leigh married a Shoshone woman named Jenny, establishing a home on the western slopes of the Teton Range. The couple raised five children together: Dick Jr., Anne Jane, John, William, and Elizabeth. Leigh gained recognition for his expertise in hunting, trapping, and guiding expeditions. Notably, he constructed a free ferry at Eagle Nest Ford on the Snake River. He acted as a liaison between settlers and the Shoshone tribe. Leigh guided Ferdinand Hayden's expedition through Yellowstone in 1871. His contributions were acknowledged by the expedition, with Leigh Lake, Jenny Lake, and String Lake (formerly Beaver Dick Lake) named in his honor and his wife's. In 1876, Jenny and all their children died of smallpox contracted from a visiting Indian woman. Leigh survived and remarried in 1879 to Susan Tadpole. He had three children with Susan: Emma, William, and Rose. Through the end of his life, he continued guiding hunting parties. While camped near Two Ocean Creek in 1891, he was visited by Theodore Roosevelt and his hunting party and Teddy and Richard conversed about their experiences and stories. He remained a respected figure within the community until his death in 1899. He was buried in Wilford, Idaho.

A letter from Beaver Dick Leigh describing the smallpox sickness and deaths of Jenny and five children can be found in Margaret and Olaus Murie’s book Wapiti Wilderness, p. 89.
