= Fremont Lake =

Lake in Wyoming, USA

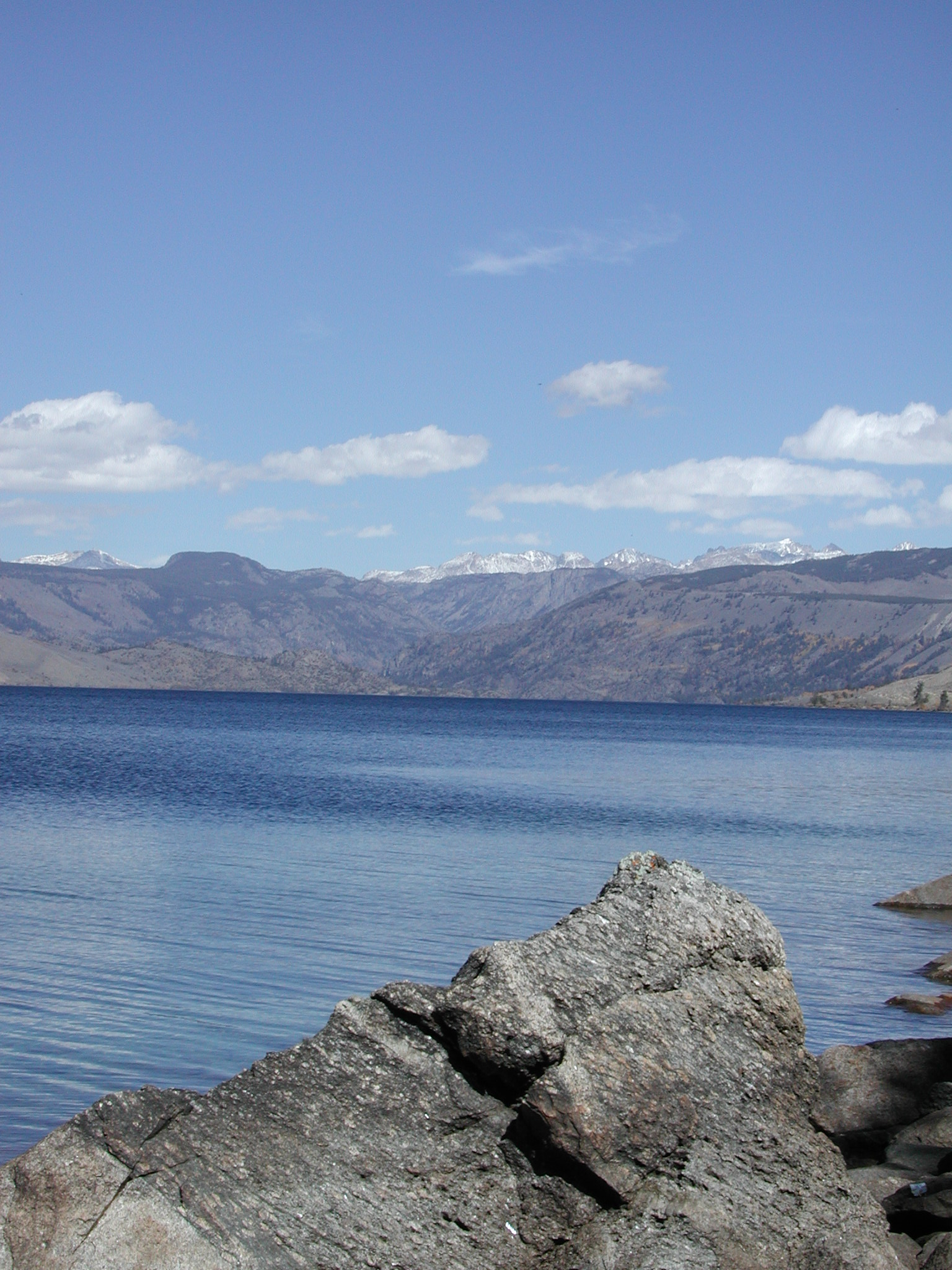

- Location within Wyoming
- Location: Bridger–Teton National Forest, Wyoming
- Coordinates: 42.956°N 109.799°W
- Primary inflows: Pine Creek
- Catchment area: 196 km^{2} (76 sq mi)
- Max. length: 15 km (9.3 mi)
- Max. width: 2 km (1.2 mi)
- Surface area: 2,045 ha (5,050 acres)
- Average depth: 82.5 m (271 ft)
- Max. depth: 690 ft (210 m)
- Surface elevation: 2,262 m (7,421 ft)
- Settlements: Pinedale, Wyoming, 4 km (2.5 mi) SW

Fremont Lake is the second largest natural lake in Wyoming after Yellowstone Lake. It is located in the foothills of the Wind River Range, in a glacially formed basin with the outlet blocked by a terminal moraine. The lake is notable for being very deep at 185 m (607 ft) feet in the deepest spot.

Fremont Lake is a classic example of a high-altitude glacial lake. The elongate lake lies in a granitic trough that was scoured by glacial ice and is underlain by glacial till and granitic bedrock.

Fremont Lake is characterized by steep sides, both above and below the water level. A constriction of Fremont Lake divides the lake into northern and southern parts, separated by a relatively shallow area and marked by narrowing of the lake width. The northern part of Fremont Lake has many bays and an irregular shoreline compared to the fairly regular shoreline and few bays of the southern part. The notably flat bottom of Fremont Lake in the southern part may be due to sediment deposited by density currents.

Peak runoff in the area occurs during May and June, and minimum flow occurs during winter. Outflow from the lake is partly controlled by structures installed to provide water storage for irrigation.

== See also ==
- List of lakes of Wyoming
