= Glacier Falls (Teton County, Wyoming) =

- Location within Wyoming
- Location: Grand Teton National Park, United States
- Coordinates: 43.729108°N 110.759298°W
- Type: Cascade
- Total height: 300 feet (91 m)
- Watercourse: Intermittent stream

Glacier Falls is a cascade located in Glacier Gulch, Grand Teton National Park in the U.S. state of Wyoming. It drops approximately 300 feet (91 m) in Glacier Gulch, fed by runoff from the Teton Glacier. More than .5 miles (0.80 km) below Delta Lake, it is a highly intermittent waterfall, usually at peak flow during the late spring and early summer snowmelt.
