= Emma Matilda Lake Trail =

Hiking trail in Wyoming, United States

Coordinates: 43°53′47″N 110°31′18″W

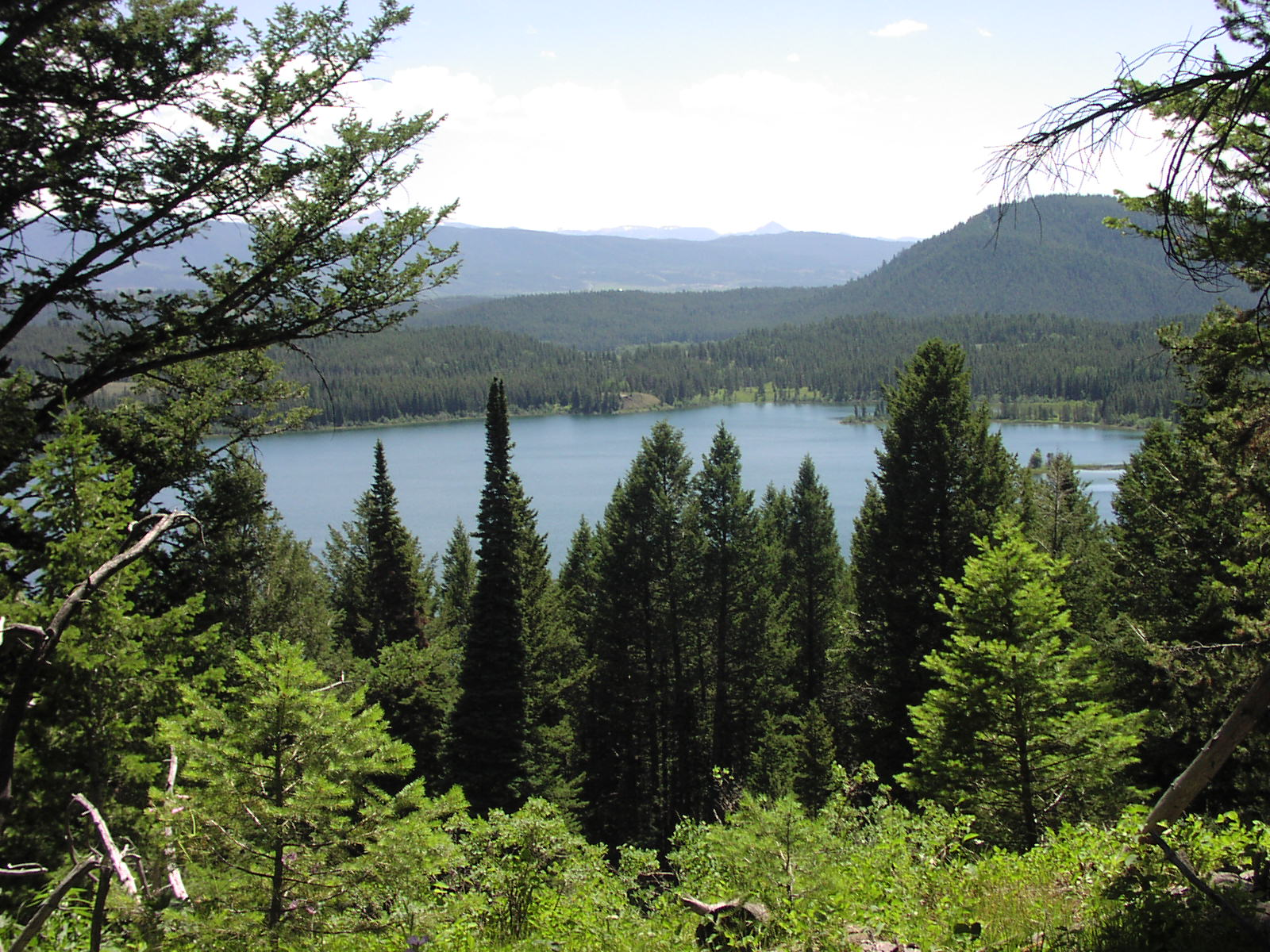
- Emma Matilda Lake from the trail
- Length: 10.7 mi (17.2 km)
- Location: Jackson Hole
- Trailheads: Jackson Lake Lodge
- Use: Hiking
- Elevation change: Approximate gain of 1,350 ft (410 m)
- Highest point: Along trail, 7,300 ft (2,200 m)
- Lowest point: Jackson lake Lodge, 6,840 ft (2,080 m)
- Difficulty: Moderate
- Season: Spring to Fall
- Sights: Teton Range; Emma Matilda Lake
- Hazards: Severe weather

The Emma Matilda Lake Trail is a 10.7-mile (17.2 km) long hiking trail located within the Grand Teton National Park in the U.S. state of Wyoming. This trail and the adjacent lake are named after the wife of William O. Owen, who in 1898 was among the first four climbers in recorded history to climb to the summit of Grand Teton. The trail can be accessed from Jackson Lake Lodge or from the Two Ocean Lake trailhead. The Emma Matilda Lake Trail loops completely around Emma Matilda Lake, and provides views of the lake and the entire Teton Range.

== Fauna ==
A variety of wildlife can be found along the trail as it climbs through various forests, marshes, and meadows. Of particular note are the moose, river otters, beavers, muskrats, coyotes, and mule deer.

== See also ==
List of hiking trails in Grand Teton National Park
