= Two Ocean Lake Trail =

Hiking trail in Wyoming, United States

Coordinates: 43°54′56″N 110°31′16″W

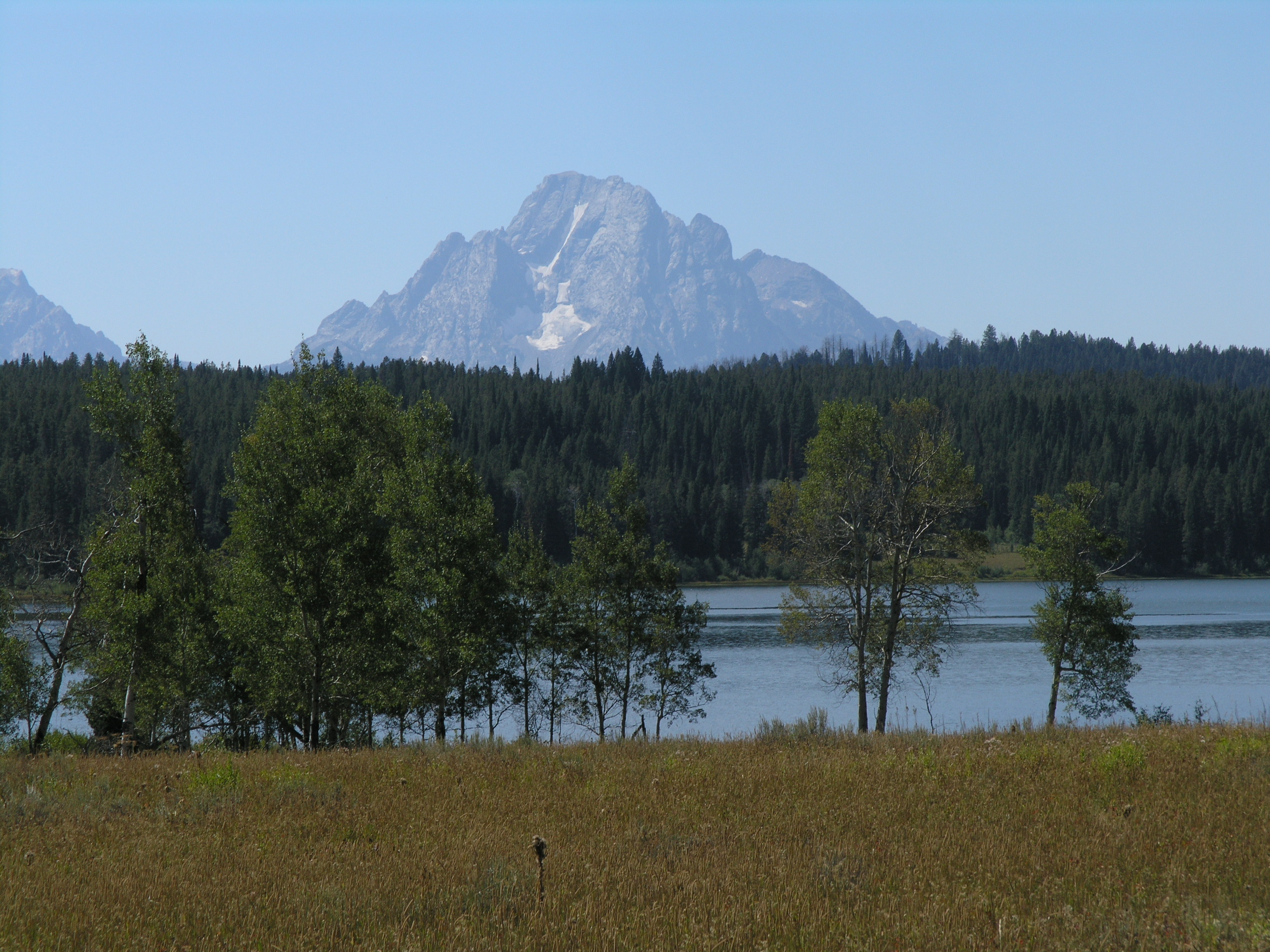
- View of Two Ocean Lake and Mount Moran from the trail
- Length: 6.4 mi (10.3 km)
- Location: Jackson Hole
- Trailheads: Two Ocean Lake trailhead
- Use: Hiking
- Elevation change: Approximate gain of 625 ft (191 m)
- Highest point: Along trail, 7,300 ft (2,200 m)
- Lowest point: Two Ocean Lake trailhead, 6,910 ft (2,110 m)
- Difficulty: Moderate
- Season: Spring to Fall
- Sights: Teton Range; Two Ocean Lake
- Hazards: Severe weather

The Two Ocean Lake Trail is a 6.4-mile (10.3 km) long hiking trail in Grand Teton National Park in the U.S. state of Wyoming. The trail is accessed from the Two Ocean Lake trailhead and loops completely around Two Ocean Lake, providing views of the lake and the Teton Range. Connecting trails lead to the Emma Matilda Lake Trail and a loop of both Two Ocean and Emma Matilda Lakes can be done which covers 13.2 mi (21.2 km).

== See also ==
- List of hiking trails in Grand Teton National Park
