= Hidden Falls (Teton County, Wyoming) =

Waterfall in Grand Teton National Park, Wyoming, USA

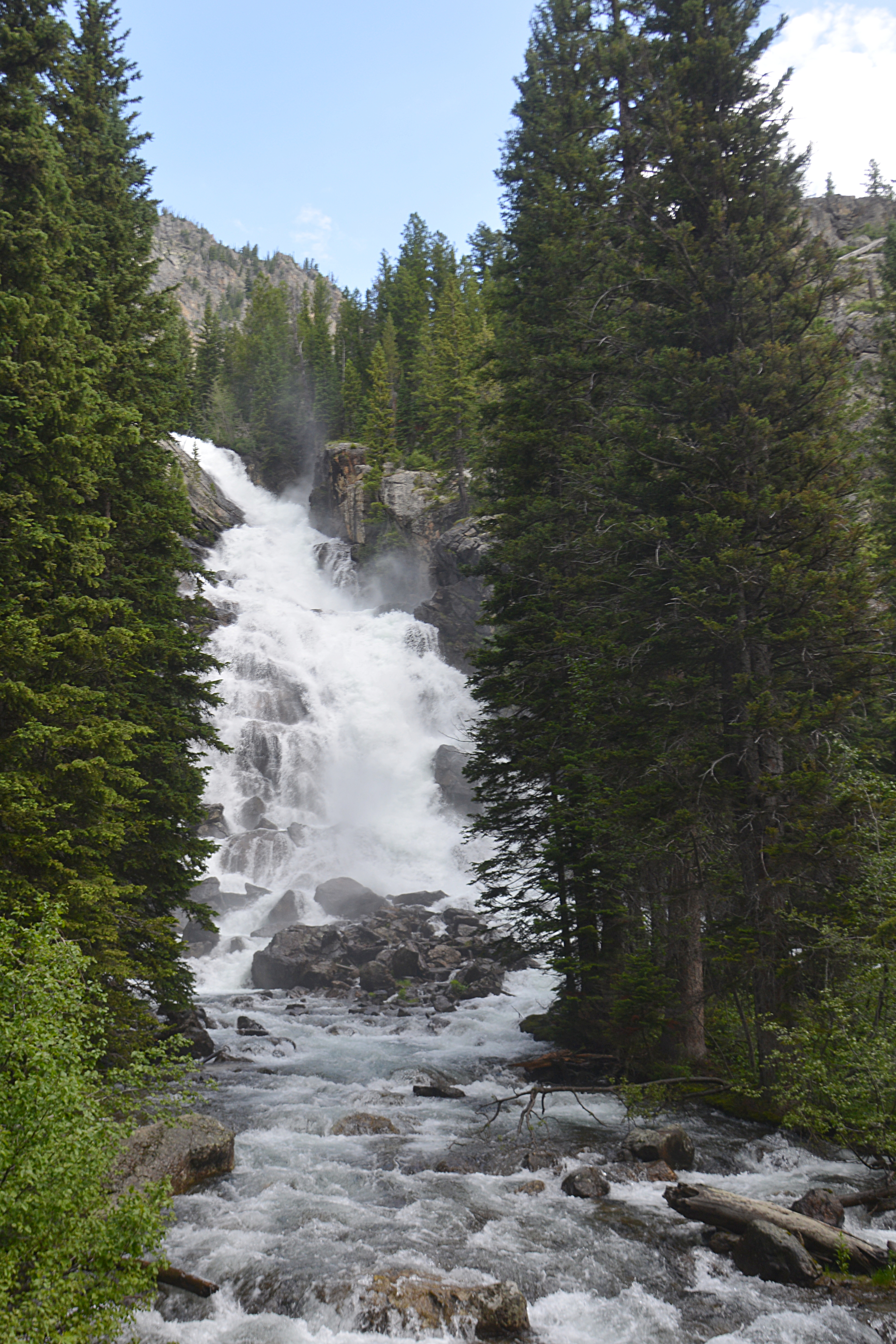
- Hidden Falls (Note: This photo is left-right reversed)

- Location within Wyoming
- Location: Grand Teton National Park, United States
- Coordinates: 43.766599°N 110.756324°W
- Type: Cascade
- Total height: 100 feet (30 m)
- Watercourse: Cascade Creek

Hidden Falls is located on Cascade Creek, Grand Teton National Park in the U.S. state of Wyoming. The falls drop approximately 100 feet (30 m) near the eastern end of Cascade Canyon, and west of Jenny Lake. The easiest way to access the falls is by way of the Jenny Lake boat shuttle which goes from South Jenny Lake to the entrance of Cascade Canyon. From there it is a 1.2-mile (1.9 km) roundtrip hike along the Cascade Canyon Trail to viewing points for the falls. Another option is to hike 5.2 miles (8.4 km) roundtrip from South Jenny Lake on the Jenny Lake Trail. During the summer vacation period, Hidden Falls is one of the busiest tourist attractions in Grand Teton National Park.
