= Mount Wister =

Mountain in the state of Wyoming

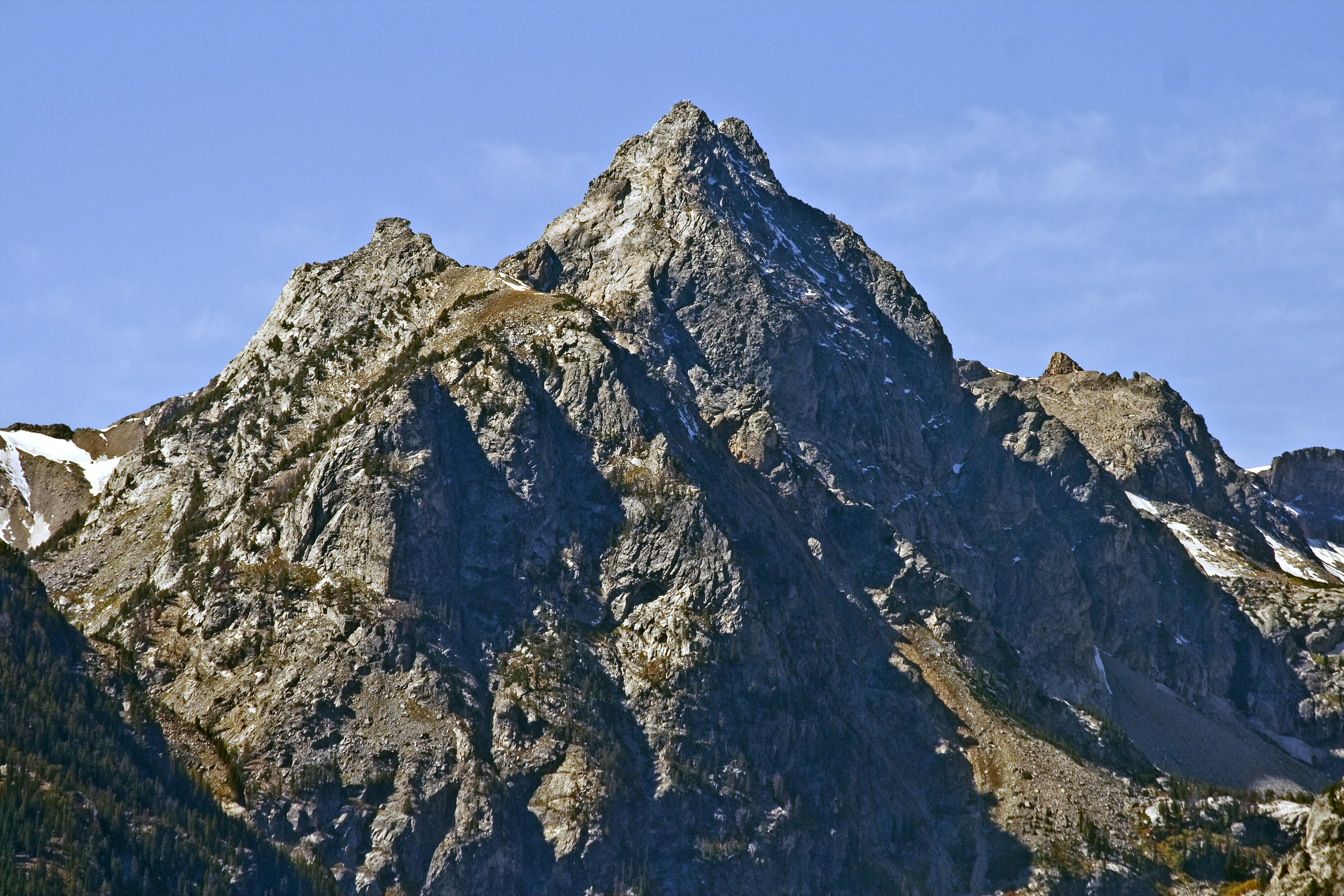
- Mount Wister

Highest point
- Elevation: 11,495 ft (3,504 m) NAVD 88
- Prominence: 690 ft (210 m)
- Coordinates: 43°42′07″N 110°49′01″W

Geography
- Location within Wyoming Location within the United States
- Location: Grand Teton National Park, Teton County, Wyoming, U.S.
- Parent range: Teton Range
- Topo map: USGS Grand Teton

Climbing
- First ascent: 1928 by Phil Smith

Mount Wister (11,495 ft or 3,504 m) is located in the Teton Range, Grand Teton National Park, in the U.S. state of Wyoming. The peak is located 5 miles (8.0 km) west of Taggart Lake and to the south of Avalanche Canyon.

The mountain is named after famed author Owen Wister, an early visitor to the area. Mount Wister was first climbed by Phil Smith in 1928.
