= Amphitheater Lake =

Lake in Wyoming, United States

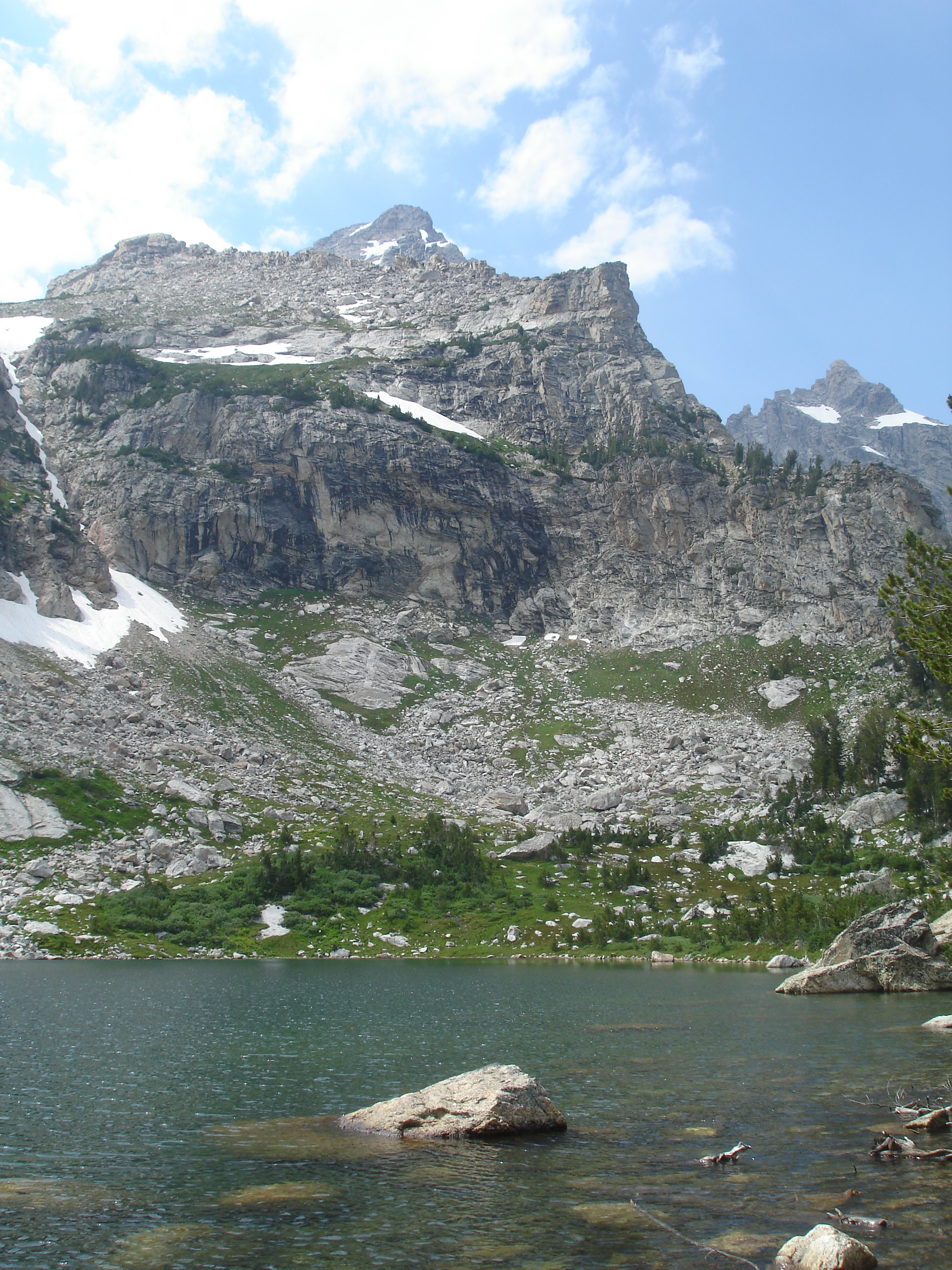

- Location within Wyoming
- Location: Grand Teton National Park, Teton County, Wyoming, US
- Coordinates: 43°43′47″N 110°46′52″W
- Type: Glacial Lake
- Basin countries: United States
- Max. length: 230 yd (210 m)
- Max. width: 150 yd (140 m)
- Surface elevation: 9,698 ft (2,956 m)

Amphitheater Lake is located in Grand Teton National Park, in the U. S. state of Wyoming. Amphitheater Lake is only .20 miles (0.32 km) west of Surprise Lake and can be accessed via a strenuous climb of just under 10 miles (16 km) round trip from the Lupine Meadows trailhead. Disappointment Peak is .50 miles (0.80 km) WNW of the lake.

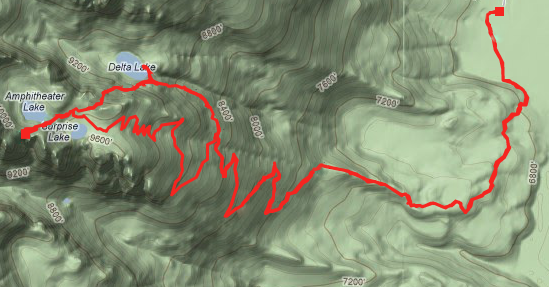
Trail to Amphitheater Lake
