= Surprise Lake (Teton County, Wyoming) =

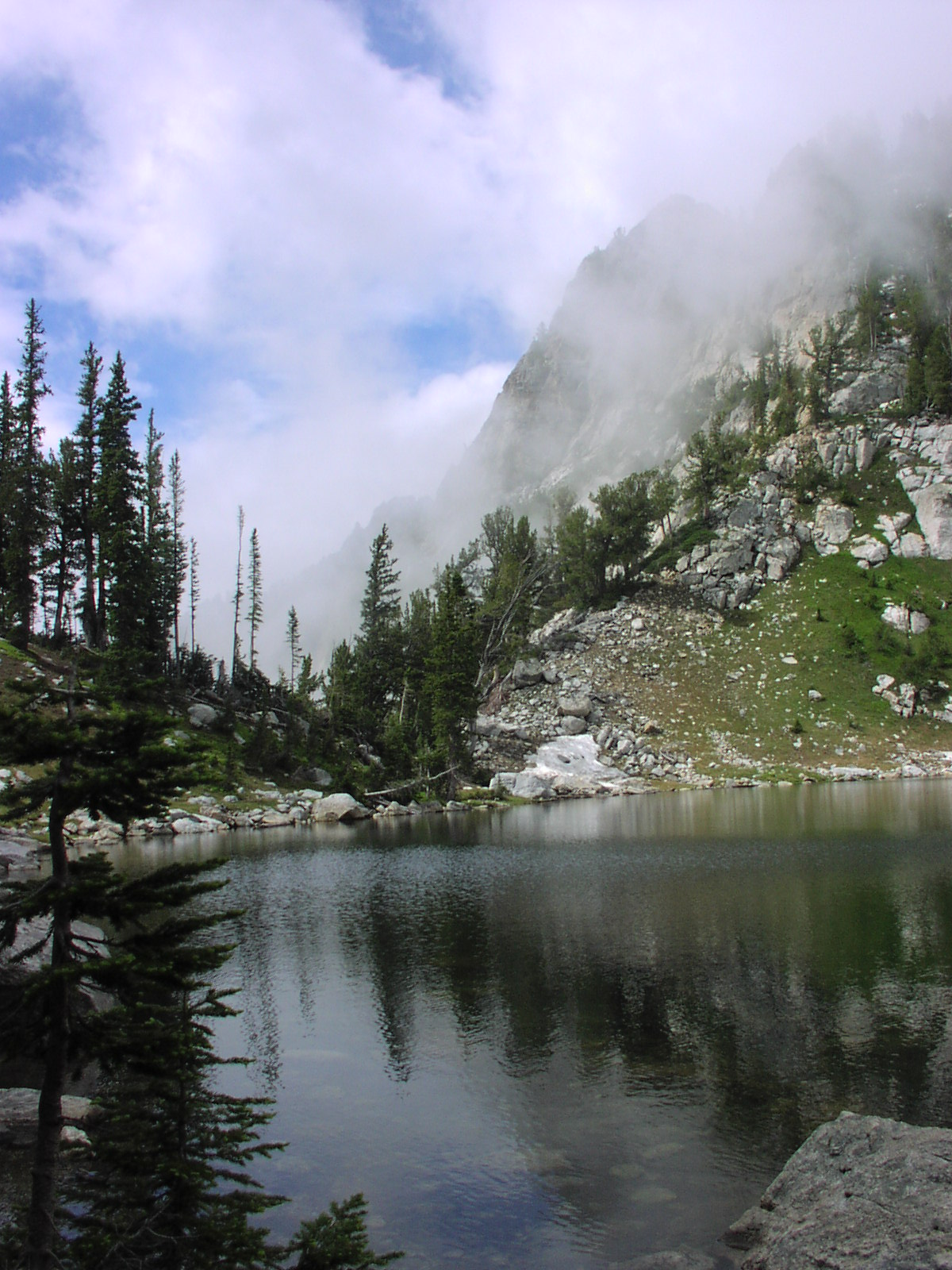
- Surprise Lake

- Location within Wyoming Location within the United States
- Location: Grand Teton National Park, Teton County, Wyoming, US
- Coordinates: 43°43′43″N 110°46′39″W
- Type: Glacial Lake
- Basin countries: United States
- Max. length: 100 yd (91 m)
- Max. width: 100 yd (91 m)
- Surface elevation: 9,570 ft (2,920 m)

Surprise Lake is a lake in Grand Teton National Park, in the U. S. state of Wyoming. Surprise Lake is on .20 miles (0.32 km) east of Amphitheater Lake and can be accessed via a strenuous climb of just under 10 miles (16 km) round trip from the Lupine Meadows trailhead. The National Park Service has three backcountry campsites at Surprise Lake which are allocated by permit only.

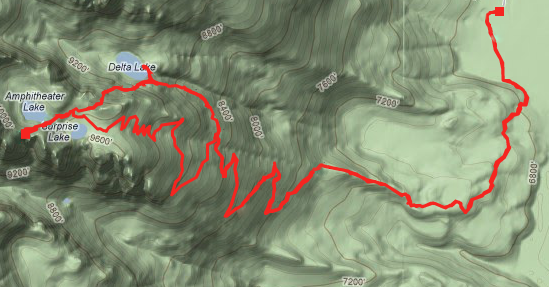
Trail to Surprise Lake
