= Emma Matilda Lake =

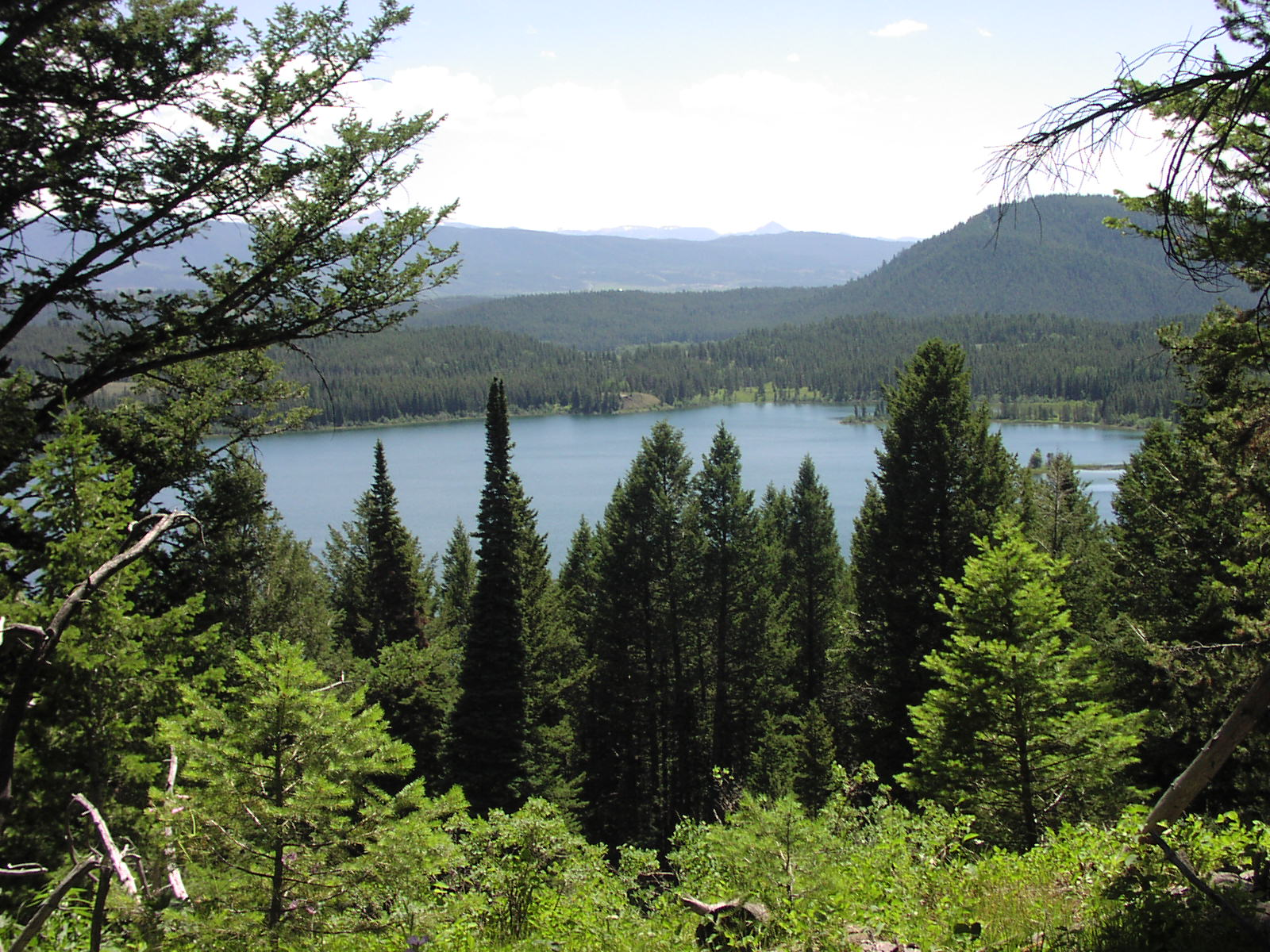
- Emma Matilda Lake

- Location within Wyoming Location within the United States
- Location: Grand Teton National Park, Teton County, Wyoming, US
- Coordinates: 43°53′11″N 110°31′58″W
- Type: natural lake
- Basin countries: United States
- Max. length: 2.7 mi (4.3 km)
- Max. width: .5 mi (0.80 km)
- Surface area: 960 acres (390 ha)
- Surface elevation: 6,873 ft (2,095 m)

Emma Matilda Lake is located in Grand Teton National Park, in the U. S. state of Wyoming. The lake is named after the wife of William O. Owen who was the first, along with three other climbers, to ascend to the summit of Grand Teton in 1898. The natural lake is 2.7 miles (4.3 km) long and can be reached by way of a 1-mile (1.6 km) hike from a parking area at Two Ocean Lake or via a slightly longer hike from Jackson Lake Lodge. The 10.7-mile (17.2 km) Emma Matilda Lake Trail circles the lake and offers distant views of the Teton Range.

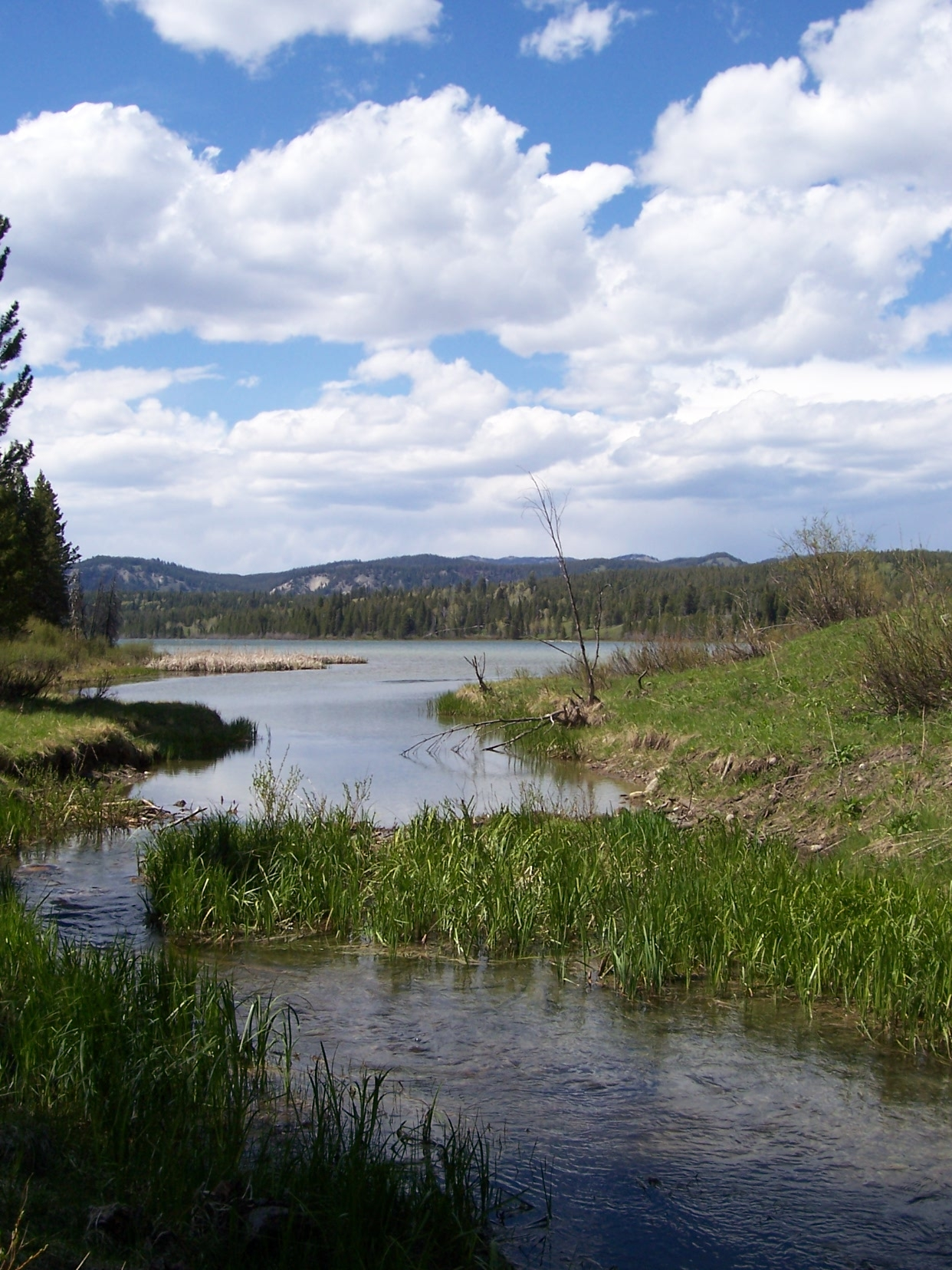
Outlet stream from Emma Matilda Lake

== See also ==
- Geology of the Grand Teton area
