= Two Ocean Lake =

Lake in the American state of Wyoming

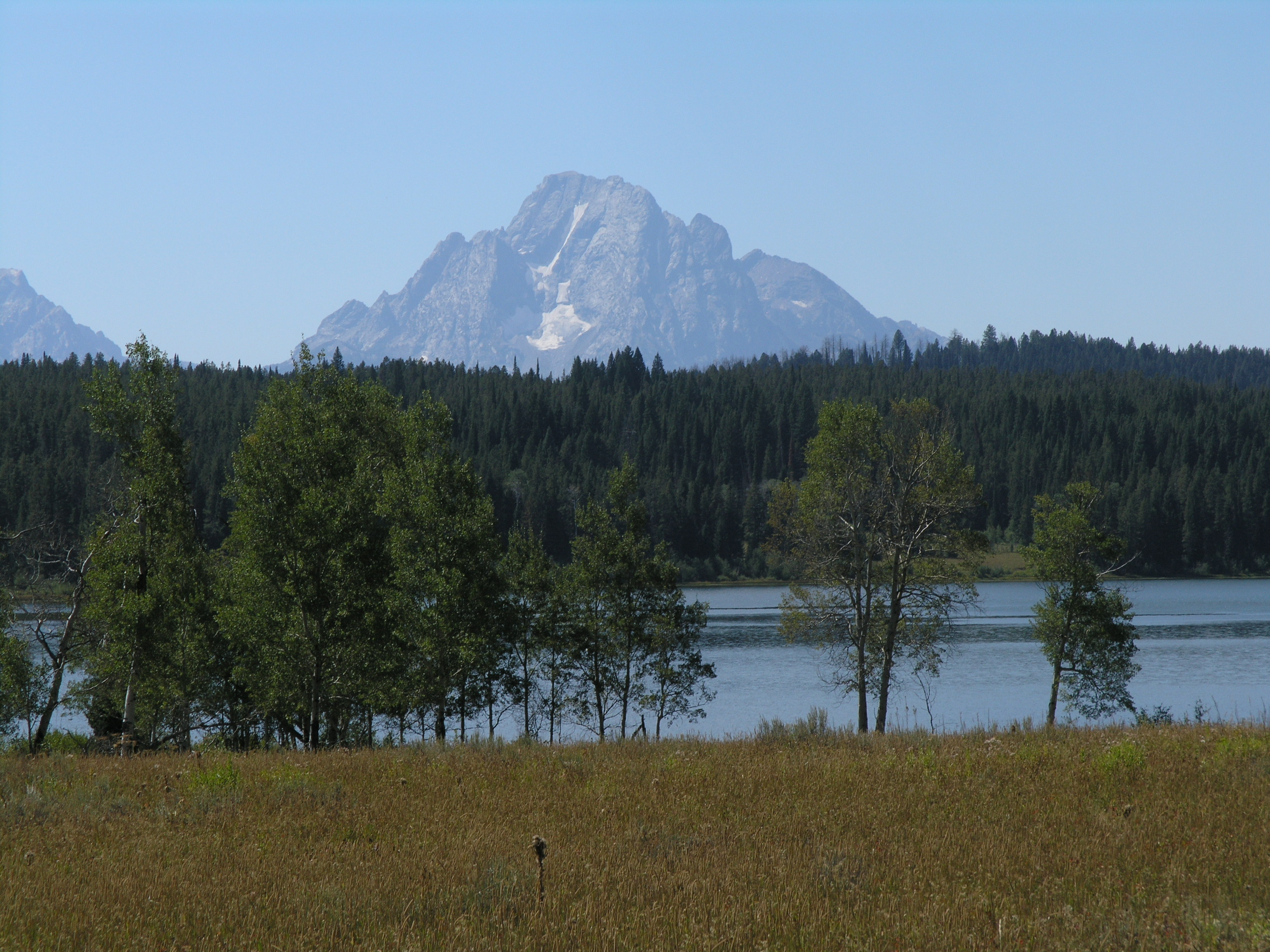
- Two Ocean lake with Mount Moran in the background

- Location within Wyoming Location within the United States
- Location: Grand Teton National Park, Teton County, Wyoming, US
- Coordinates: 43°54′34″N 110°31′25″W
- Type: Glacial Lake
- Primary outflows: Pacific Creek
- Basin countries: United States
- Max. length: 2.8 mi (4.5 km)
- Max. width: .45 mi (0.72 km)
- Surface area: 806 acres (326 ha)
- Surface elevation: 6,896 ft (2,102 m)

Two Ocean Lake is located in Grand Teton National Park, in the U.S. state of Wyoming. The glacially formed lake is 2.4 miles (3.9 km) long and can be reached from a parking area adjacent to the lake. The Two Ocean Lake Trail is 6.4 miles (10.3 km) long and circles the lake passing through forests and clearings. The larger Emma Matilda Lake is one mile (1.6 km) to the south.

Two Ocean Lake, in the northeastern portion of the park near Moran, was named for Two Ocean Pass about 25 miles (40 km) to the northeast where Atlantic Creek flows east and Pacific Creek flows west. Two Ocean Lake only flows into Pacific Creek so the name is a misnomer.

== See also ==
- Geology of the Grand Teton area
