= South Fork Cascade Canyon Trail =

Hiking trail in Grand Teton National Park, Wyoming

Coordinates: 43°45′49″N 110°45′50″W

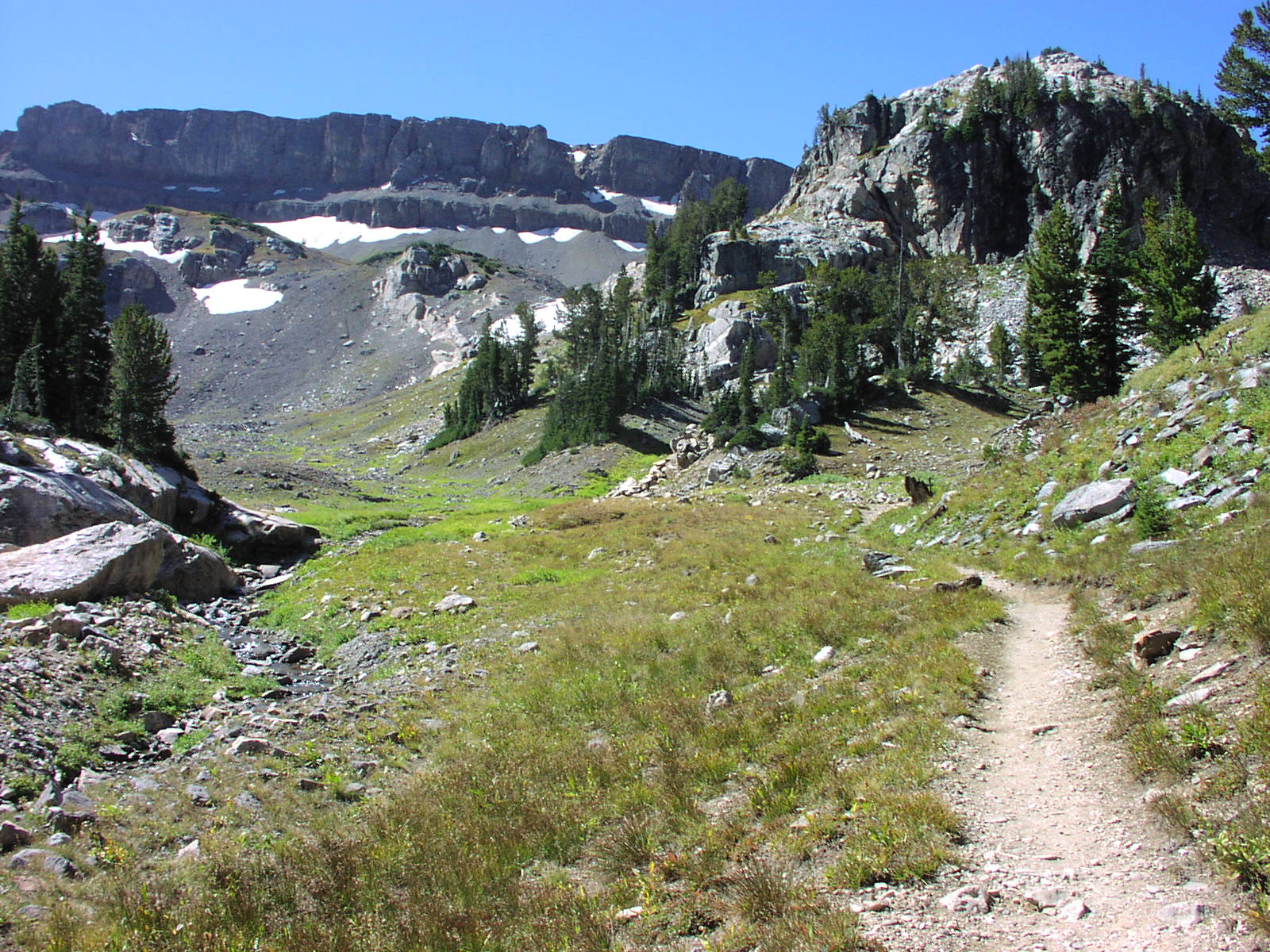
- South Fork Cascade Canyon Trail
- Length: 5.6 mi (9.0 km)
- Location: Teton Range
- Trailheads: Forks of Cascade Canyon
- Use: Hiking
- Elevation change: Approximate gain of 2,200 ft (670 m)
- Highest point: Hurricane Pass, 10,338 ft (3,151 m)
- Lowest point: Forks of Cascade Canyon, 8,100 ft (2,500 m)
- Difficulty: Strenuous
- Season: Summer to Fall
- Sights: Teton Range
- Hazards: Severe weather

The South Fork Cascade Canyon Trail is a 5.6-mile (9.0 km) long hiking trail in Grand Teton National Park in the U.S. state of Wyoming. The trail begins at the Forks of Cascade Canyon and extends to Hurricane Pass. A short connector trail just before Hurricane Pass leads to Schoolroom Glacier. From the Forks of Cascade Canyon and most of the way through South Cascade Canyon, backcountry camping is allowed with a permit. The South Fork Cascade Canyon Trail is also part of the Teton Crest Trail its entire length and to the south beyond Hurricane Pass lies Alaska Basin.

== See also ==
- List of hiking trails in Grand Teton National Park
