= Gunsight Pass (disambiguation) =

Gunsight Pass is a pass in Gunnison County, Colorado, United States.

Gunsight Pass may also refer to:

== In the United States ==
- Gunsight Pass (California), a pass in San Bernardino County, California, United States
- Gunsight Pass (Archuletta County, Colorado), a pass in Archuleta County, Colorado, United States
- Gunsight Pass (Grand County, Colorado), a pass in Grand County, Colorado, United States
- Gunsight Pass (Oh-be-joyful, Colorado), a pass in Gunnison County Colorado, United States
- Gunsight Pass (Montana), a pass on the Continental Divide of the Americas in Glacier National Park, Montana, United States
  - Gunsight Pass Shelter, a historical shelter at the pass
- Gunsight Pass (Lane County, Oregon), a pass in Lane County, Oregon, United States
- Gunsight Pass (Malheur County, Oregon), a pass in Malheur County, Oregon, United States
- Gunsight Pass (Lincoln County, Wyoming), a pass in Lincoln County, Wyoming, United States
- Gunsight Pass (Sauerkraut Lakes), a pass in Sublette County, Wyoming, United States
- Gunsight Pass (Roaring Fork Basin), a pass in Sublette County, Wyoming, United States
- Gunsight Pass (Teton County, Wyoming), a pass in Teton County, Wyoming, United States
- Gunsight Pass: How Oil Came to the Cattle Country and Brought a New West, a novel by William MacLeod Raine

== Elsewhere ==
- Gunsight Pass (Canada), a pass on the Continental Divide of the Americas between Alberta and British Columbia, Canada
- Gunsight Pass (New Zealand), a pass near Lake Ōhau in the South Island

== See also ==
- The Marshal of Gunsight Pass, a Western TV series
- Fury at Gunsight Pass, A Western film
- "Massacre at Gunsight Pass", an episode of the Western TV series Cheyenne
- List of mountain passes
