= Spearhead Peak =

Mountain in Wyoming, United States

- Location within Wyoming Location within the United States

Highest point
- Elevation: 10,131 ft (3,088 m)
- Prominence: 171 ft (52 m)
- Coordinates: 43°38′13″N 110°54′40″W

Geography
- Location: Caribou-Targhee National Forest, Teton County, Wyoming, U.S.
- Parent range: Teton Range
- Topo map: USGS Mount Bannon

Climbing
- Easiest route: Scramble

Spearhead Peak (10,131 feet (3,088 m)) is located in the Teton Range, Caribou-Targhee National Forest in the U.S. state of Wyoming. The peak is situated near the head of Death Canyon and the Teton Crest Trail is immediately west of the peak.
