= Death Canyon Trail =

Hiking trail in Grand Teton National Park, US

Coordinates: 43°39′11″N 110°48′24″W

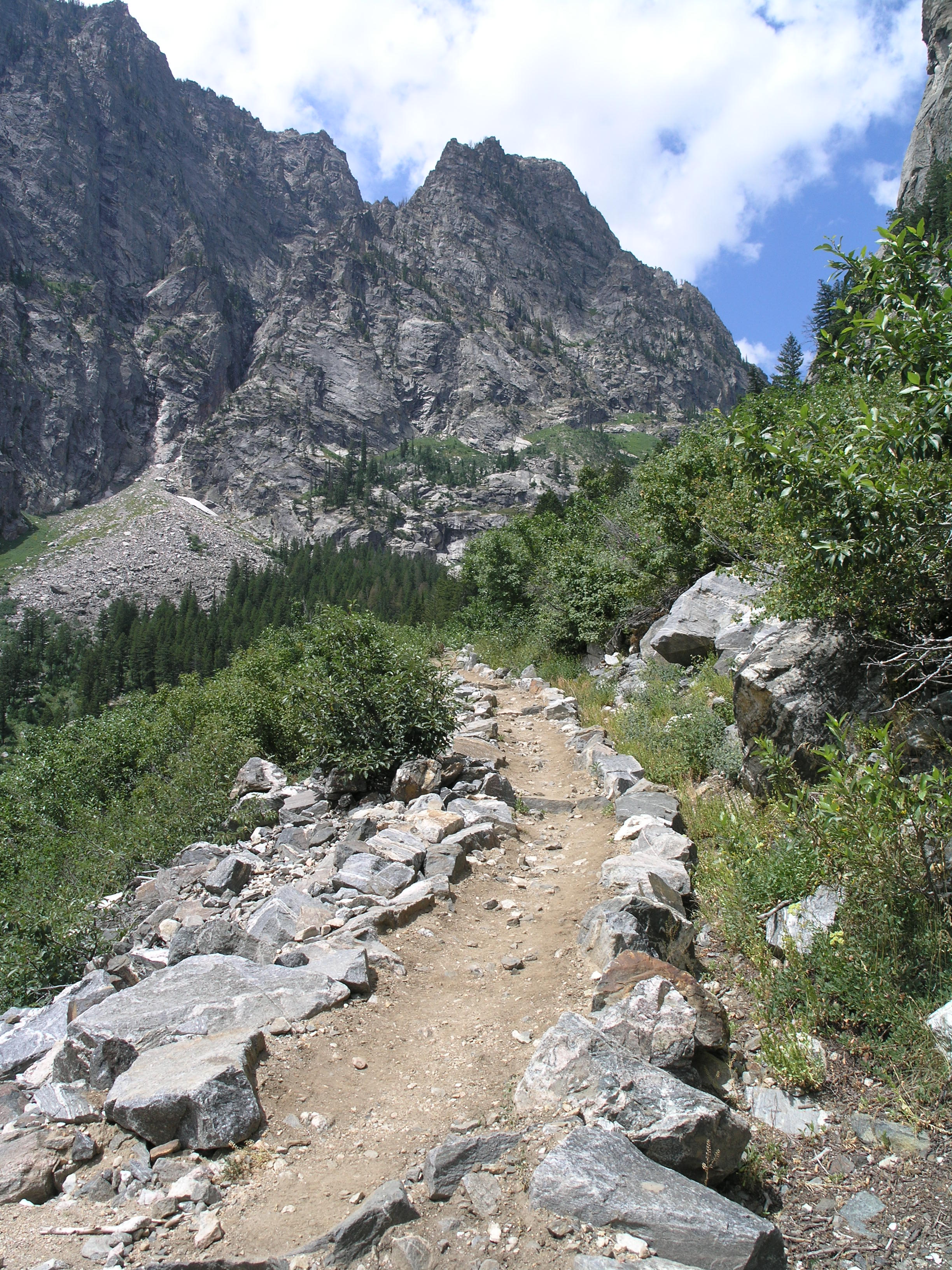
- The Death Canyon Trail traverses the length of Death Canyon
- Length: 10.5 mi (16.9 km)
- Location: Teton Range
- Trailheads: Death Canyon Trailhead; Fox Creek Pass
- Use: Hiking
- Elevation change: Approximate gain of 2,800 ft (850 m)
- Highest point: Fox Creek Pass, 9,570 ft (2,920 m)
- Lowest point: Death Canyon Trailhead, 6,807 ft (2,075 m)
- Difficulty: Strenuous
- Season: Summer to Fall
- Sights: Teton Range
- Hazards: Severe weather

The Death Canyon Trail is a 10.5 mi (16.9 km) long hiking trail in Grand Teton National Park in the U.S. state of Wyoming.

== Route ==
The trail begins west of the White Grass Ranger Station Historic District and ends at Fox Creek Pass where it intercepts the Teton Crest Trail. The trail follows the length of Death Canyon. To get to the trail, the Valley Trail must be accessed at the White Grass Grass Ranger Station then by trending westward just to the north of Phelps Lake. Near Phelps Lake Overlook, the Death Canyon Trail heads west and is flanked by Albright Peak to the north and Prospectors Mountain to the south. After over 2 mi (3.2 km), the canyon widens and is intercepted by the Alaska Basin Trail. The Death Canyon Trail continues west then southwest, climbing steadily to Fox Creek Pass. The camping zone in the canyon extends from just west of the Alaska Basin Trail junction to .5 mi (0.80 km) below Fox Creek Pass and is available by permit.

== See also ==
List of hiking trails in Grand Teton National Park
