= Albright Peak =

Mountain in Wyoming, United States

- Location within Wyoming Location within the United States

Highest point
- Elevation: 10,557 ft (3,218 m)
- Prominence: 312 ft (95 m)
- Coordinates: 43°40′15″N 110°48′50″W

Geography
- Location: Teton County, Wyoming, U.S.
- Parent range: Teton Range
- Topo map: USGS Grand Teton

Climbing
- Easiest route: Scramble

Albright Peak (10,557 feet (3,218 m) is located in the Teton Range, Grand Teton National Park, in the U.S. state of Wyoming. Albright Peak is the only mountain peak named for Horace M. Albright, the second director of the National Park Service. The peak is .8 mi (1.3 km) SSE of Static Peak and towers to the northwest over Phelps Lake. The easiest climbing access to Albright Peak is via the Alaska Basin Trail.
