= Static Peak Divide =

Mountain pass in Wyoming, United States

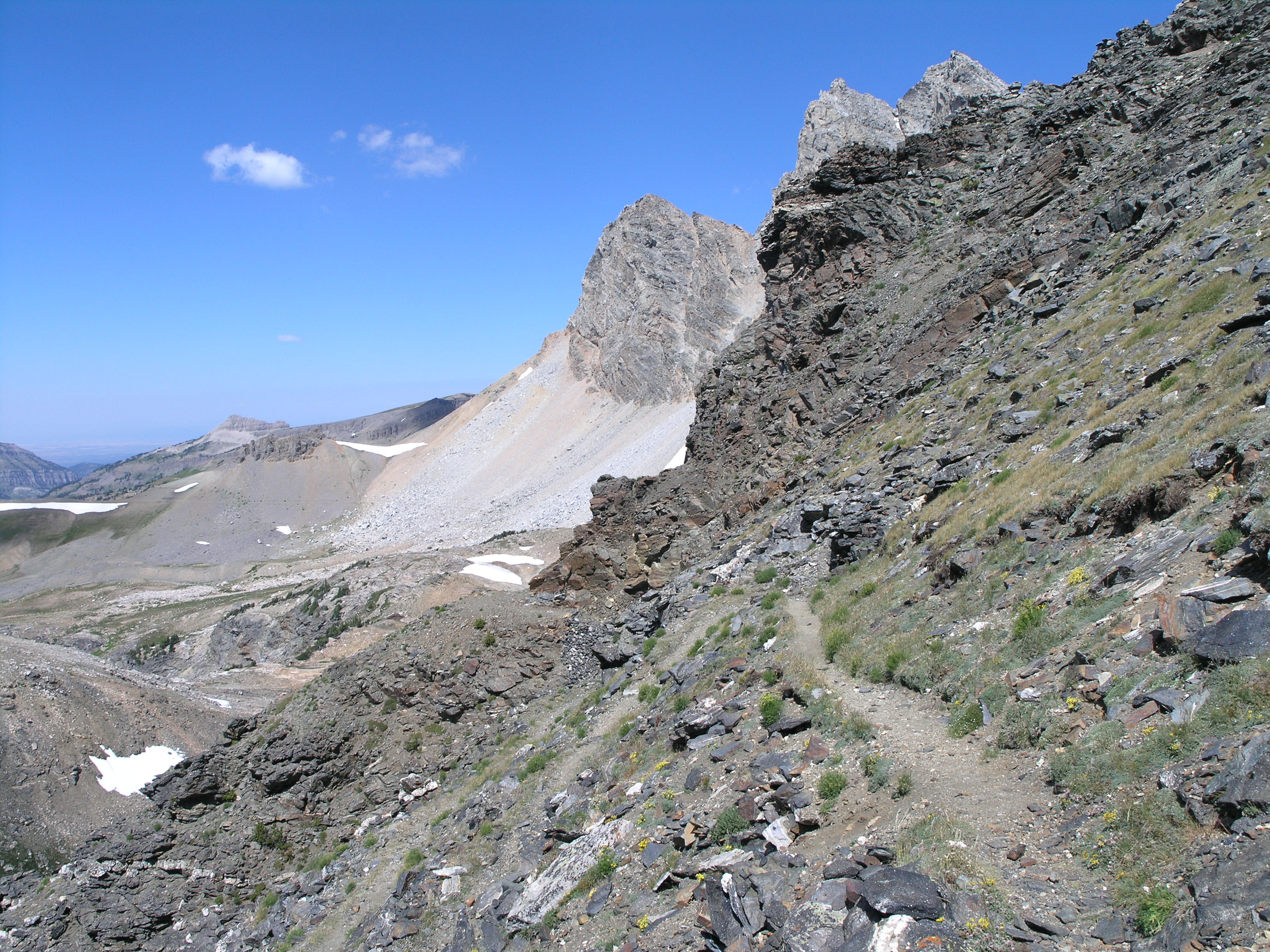
- Looking north from Static Peak Divide. Alaska basin is to the left and Grand Teton is in the background at upper right

- Location within Wyoming
- Elevation: 10,800 ft (3,300 m)
- Traversed by: Alaska Basin Trail; Death Canyon Trail

Third Approach
- Location: Teton County, Wyoming, United States
- Range: Teton Range, Rocky Mountains
- Coordinates: 43°41′13.83″N 110°49′45.71″W
- Topo map: USGS Grand Teton, WY

Static Peak Divide is a pedestrian mountain pass located in the Teton Range, Grand Teton National Park, in the U.S. state of Wyoming. The pass is situated at 10,800 ft (3,300 m) above sea level and is the high point along the Alaska Basin Trail which is accessed from Death Canyon. The Static Peak Divide is the highest altitude mountain pass along any maintained trail in Grand Teton National Park and is just west of Static Peak.
