= List of mountain passes in Wyoming (A–J) =

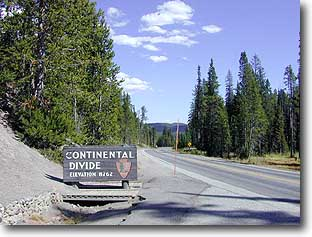
Craig Pass, Teton County, Wyoming

There are at least 250 named mountain passes in Wyoming, a state in the mountain region of the Western United States. Wyoming is the 10th most extensive, but the least populous and the 2nd least densely populated of the 50 United States. The western two thirds of the state is covered mostly with the mountain ranges and rangelands in the foothills of the Eastern Rocky Mountains, while the eastern third of the state is high elevation prairie known as the High Plains.

- Adams Pass, Fremont County, Wyoming, 42°50′40″N 109°07′03″W, el. 10,971 feet (3,344 m)
- Angel Pass, Sublette County, Wyoming, 43°01′06″N 109°33′14″W, el. 11,598 feet (3,535 m)
- Antelope Gap, Platte County, Wyoming, 42°01′52″N 104°48′28″W, el. 5,056 feet (1,541 m)
- Backpackers Pass, Fremont County, Wyoming, 43°10′04″N 109°37′11″W, el. 12,864 feet (3,921 m)
- Bar C Gap, Johnson County, Wyoming, 43°36′30″N 106°51′40″W, el. 5,266 feet (1,605 m)
- Bare Pass, Sublette County, Wyoming, 42°42′48″N 110°30′34″W, el. 9,094 feet (2,772 m)
- Barlow Gap, Natrona County, Wyoming, 42°38′46″N 107°21′40″W, el. 6,939 feet (2,115 m)
- Batrum Gap, Fremont County, Wyoming, 42°47′59″N 108°39′47″W, el. 5,282 feet (1,610 m)
- Battle Pass, Carbon County, Wyoming, 41°09′20″N 106°58′57″W, el. 9,911 feet (3,021 m)
- Bear Creek Pass, Fremont County, Wyoming, 43°50′28″N 109°21′08″W, el. 11,293 feet (3,442 m)
- Bear Cub Pass, Fremont County, Wyoming, 43°47′51″N 110°00′28″W, el. 9,472 feet (2,887 m)
- Bear Cub Pass, Teton County, Wyoming, 43°50′50″N 110°09′23″W, el. 7,592 feet (2,314 m)
- Bear Pass, Fremont County, Wyoming, 43°44′03″N 109°30′29″W, el. 9,468 feet (2,886 m)
- Beartooth Pass, Park County, Wyoming, 44°58′09″N 109°28′18″W, el. 10,948 feet (3,337 m)
- Beartrap Junction, Sublette County, Wyoming, 42°55′43″N 110°34′11″W, el. 8,993 feet (2,741 m)
- Beef Gap, Natrona County, Wyoming, 42°31′54″N 107°25′11″W, el. 6,450 feet (1,970 m)
- Bighorn Pass, Park County, Wyoming, 44°52′21″N 110°52′51″W, el. 9,088 feet (2,770 m)
- Birdseye Pass, Fremont County, Wyoming, 43°27′30″N 108°04′18″W, el. 6,982 feet (2,128 m)
- Bitch Creek Narrows, Teton County, Wyoming, 43°56′11″N 110°53′34″W, el. 7,329 feet (2,234 m)
- Black Gap, Niobrara County, Wyoming, 42°38′42″N 107°02′00″W, el. 6,250 feet (1,900 m)
- Black Rock Gap, Fremont County, Wyoming, 42°36′48″N 107°44′48″W, el. 6,585 feet (2,007 m)
- Blaurock Pass, Fremont County, Wyoming, 43°10′27″N 109°36′27″W, el. 12,749 feet (3,886 m)
- Blazon Gap, Lincoln County, Wyoming, 41°41′18″N 110°32′43″W, el. 6,765 feet (2,062 m)
- Bliss Pass, Park County, Wyoming, 44°59′57″N 110°08′33″W, el. 9,111 feet (2,777 m)
- Blondy Pass, Hot Springs County, Wyoming, 43°36′36″N 108°50′05″W, el. 8,090 feet (2,470 m)
- Blue Gap, Carbon County, Wyoming, 41°15′38″N 107°42′59″W, el. 6,519 feet (1,987 m)
- Boneside Pass, Carbon County, Wyoming, 41°50′33″N 106°56′16″W, el. 6,637 feet (2,023 m)
- Bonneville Pass, Fremont County, Wyoming, 43°46′41″N 109°57′07″W, el. 9,977 feet (3,041 m)
- Bonney Pass, Fremont County, Wyoming, 43°09′53″N 109°38′18″W, el. 12,831 feet (3,911 m)
- Bootjack Gap, Park County, Wyoming, 44°44′54″N 109°53′17″W, el. 9,147 feet (2,788 m)
- Bowles Pass, Fremont County, Wyoming, 43°48′18″N 109°52′52″W, el. 10,797 feet (3,291 m)
- Box Canyon Pass, Lincoln County, Wyoming, 42°40′30″N 110°37′03″W, el. 9,626 feet (2,934 m)
- Bridger Gap, Uinta County, Wyoming, 41°24′38″N 110°37′36″W, el. 6,975 feet (2,126 m)
- Bridger Pass, Carbon County, Wyoming, 41°33′02″N 107°25′51″W, el. 7,588 feet (2,313 m)
- Bull Elk Pass, Fremont County, Wyoming, 43°41′10″N 109°31′28″W, el. 9,360 feet (2,850 m)
- Bull Gap, Albany County, Wyoming, 42°14′02″N 105°31′53″W, el. 7,746 feet (2,361 m)
- Burwell Pass, Park County, Wyoming, 43°54′44″N 109°25′54″W, el. 11,329 feet (3,453 m)
- Cameron Pass, Albany County, Wyoming, 42°20′52″N 105°52′06″W, el. 7,802 feet (2,378 m)
- Camp Creek Saddle, Teton County, Wyoming, 43°19′18″N 110°40′15″W, el. 6,765 feet (2,062 m)
- Cannonball Cut, Albany County, Wyoming, 41°45′10″N 105°49′40″W, el. 6,942 feet (2,116 m)
- Carrot Knoll, Teton County, Wyoming, 44°00′25″N 110°52′35″W, el. 8,816 feet (2,687 m)
- Cedar Gap, Natrona County, Wyoming, 43°17′45″N 107°24′40″W, el. 6,578 feet (2,005 m)
- Cedar Pass, Carbon County, Wyoming, 41°28′57″N 106°33′09″W, el. 8,553 feet (2,607 m)
- Chamberlain Pass, Converse County, Wyoming, 42°29′38″N 105°38′59″W, el. 7,884 feet (2,403 m)
- Cheese Pass, Lincoln County, Wyoming, 42°32′37″N 110°37′03″W, el. 10,453 feet (3,186 m)
- Cheyenne Pass, Laramie County, Wyoming, 41°17′11″N 105°12′53″W, el. 7,057 feet (2,151 m)
- Christina Pass, Fremont County, Wyoming, 42°34′11″N 108°57′54″W, el. 10,731 feet (3,271 m)
- Cliff Creek Pass, Lincoln County, Wyoming, 43°05′51″N 110°35′52″W, el. 8,999 feet (2,743 m)
- Coal Chute Pass, Fremont County, Wyoming, 43°49′18″N 109°18′56″W, el. 11,178 feet (3,407 m)
- Conant Pass, Teton County, Wyoming, 44°00′20″N 110°52′16″W, el. 8,760 feet (2,670 m)
- Cony Pass, Fremont County, Wyoming, 42°47′06″N 108°59′34″W, el. 10,420 feet (3,180 m)
- Cottonwood Pass, Fremont County, Wyoming, 43°28′34″N 107°34′24″W, el. 6,726 feet (2,050 m)
- Cougar Pass, Fremont County, Wyoming, 43°52′45″N 109°39′44″W, el. 10,764 feet (3,281 m)
- Coyote Gap, Niobrara County, Wyoming, 43°05′15″N 104°19′25″W, el. 4,170 feet (1,270 m)
- Craig Pass, Teton County, Wyoming, 44°26′30″N 110°43′11″W, el. 8,323 feet (2,537 m)
- Crilly Gap, Natrona County, Wyoming, 42°39′14″N 107°19′33″W, el. 6,857 feet (2,090 m)
- Crooks Gap, Fremont County, Wyoming, 42°22′03″N 107°51′08″W, el. 6,680 feet (2,040 m)
- Crow Creek Pass, Park County, Wyoming, 44°30′52″N 110°08′29″W, el. 9,872 feet (3,009 m)
- Cube Rock Pass, Sublette County, Wyoming, 43°09′06″N 109°42′47″W, el. 10,722 feet (3,268 m)
- Cumberland Gap, Lincoln County, Wyoming, 41°35′00″N 110°34′08″W, el. 6,585 feet (2,007 m)
- Cyclone Pass, Fremont County, Wyoming, 42°47′40″N 108°59′17″W, el. 10,538 feet (3,212 m)
- Davis Pass, Fremont County, Wyoming, 43°28′01″N 107°36′56″W, el. 6,630 feet (2,020 m)
- De Pass, Fremont County, Wyoming, 43°26′40″N 107°50′44″W, el. 6,968 feet (2,124 m)
- Dead Horse Pass, Teton County, Wyoming, 43°53′11″N 110°52′59″W, el. 9,383 feet (2,860 m)
- Dead Indian Pass, Park County, Wyoming, 44°44′37″N 109°23′06″W, el. 7,874 feet (2,400 m)
- Deer Creek Pass, Park County, Wyoming, 44°08′18″N 109°45′16″W, el. 10,403 feet (3,171 m)
- Devils Gap, Fremont County, Wyoming, 42°37′58″N 108°14′54″W, el. 6,952 feet (2,119 m)
- Devils Gate, Natrona County, Wyoming, 42°26′56″N 107°12′37″W, el. 5,928 feet (1,807 m)
- Devils Pass, Converse County, Wyoming, 42°22′08″N 105°34′40″W, el. 8,222 feet (2,506 m)
- Deweys Gateway, Park County, Wyoming, 44°43′00″N 109°35′13″W, el. 6,893 feet (2,101 m)
- Dirty Gap, Natrona County, Wyoming, 42°37′58″N 107°32′20″W, el. 6,932 feet (2,113 m)
- Dull Knife Pass, Johnson County, Wyoming, 43°46′10″N 106°52′09″W, el. 6,024 feet (1,836 m)
- Dunraven Pass, Park County, Wyoming, 44°47′08″N 110°27′15″W, el. 8,842 feet (2,695 m)
- Dutch Oven Pass, Big Horn County, Wyoming, 44°27′03″N 107°22′19″W, el. 10,522 feet (3,207 m)
- Eagle Pass, Park County, Wyoming, 44°19′26″N 110°00′15″W, el. 9,498 feet (2,895 m)
- East Fork Pass, Fremont County, Wyoming, 43°50′23″N 109°19′47″W, el. 11,122 feet (3,390 m)
- Edelman Pass, Johnson County, Wyoming, 44°27′38″N 107°18′09″W, el. 10,298 feet (3,139 m)
- Elk Pass, Johnson County, Wyoming, 44°32′20″N 107°19′52″W, el. 10,692 feet (3,259 m)
- Ellison Pass, Albany County, Wyoming, 42°20′57″N 105°37′47″W, el. 8,153 feet (2,485 m)
- Elsie Col, Fremont County, Wyoming, 43°09′48″N 109°37′16″W, el. 12,985 feet (3,958 m)
- Emigrant Gap, Niobrara County, Wyoming, 42°50′42″N 106°32′16″W, el. 5,587 feet (1,703 m)
- Fackler Pass, Albany County, Wyoming, 42°24′10″N 105°46′17″W, el. 8,635 feet (2,632 m)
- Fawn Pass, Park County, Wyoming, 44°55′43″N 110°54′14″W, el. 9,104 feet (2,775 m)
- Fenton Pass, Big Horn County, Wyoming, 44°17′14″N 108°33′13″W, el. 5,991 feet (1,826 m)
- Fieldhouse Cut, Carbon County, Wyoming, 42°07′46″N 107°05′06″W, el. 7,054 feet (2,150 m)
- Fish Cut, Sweetwater County, Wyoming, 41°32′52″N 109°30′24″W, el. 6,293 feet (1,918 m)
- Florence Pass, Big Horn County, Wyoming, 44°20′45″N 107°10′51″W, el. 10,928 feet (3,331 m)
- Fontenelle Gap, Lincoln County, Wyoming, 42°05′33″N 110°26′34″W, el. 6,998 feet (2,133 m)
- Fox Creek Gap, Goshen County, Wyoming, 41°42′53″N 104°23′02″W, el. 4,954 feet (1,510 m)
- Fox Creek Pass, Teton County, Wyoming, 43°38′47″N 110°54′37″W, el. 9,570 feet (2,920 m)
- Fraker Pass, Johnson County, Wyoming, 43°46′39″N 106°56′40″W, el. 6,752 feet (2,058 m)
- Freighter Gap, Sweetwater County, Wyoming, 42°00′03″N 108°52′31″W, el. 7,464 feet (2,275 m)
- Geneva Pass, Big Horn County, Wyoming, 44°26′25″N 107°15′20″W, el. 10,308 feet (3,142 m)
- Glacier Pass, Fremont County, Wyoming, 43°10′37″N 109°39′20″W, el. 12,969 feet (3,953 m)
- Golden Gate, Park County, Wyoming, 44°56′06″N 110°43′23″W, el. 7,119 feet (2,170 m)
- Government Gap, Sheridan County, Wyoming, 44°37′51″N 107°02′40″W, el. 4,737 feet (1,444 m)
- Granite Pass, Sheridan County, Wyoming, 44°38′24″N 107°30′12″W, el. 9,035 feet (2,754 m)
- Grants Pass, Teton County, Wyoming, 44°22′55″N 110°49′31″W, el. 8,028 feet (2,447 m)
- Green River Pass, Sublette County, Wyoming, 43°08′46″N 109°44′37″W, el. 10,394 feet (3,168 m)
- Greybull Pass, Park County, Wyoming, 43°53′15″N 109°19′12″W, el. 11,279 feet (3,438 m)
- Gunsight Pass, Sublette County, Wyoming, 43°06′47″N 109°44′11″W, el. 10,522 feet (3,207 m)
- Gunsight Pass, Sublette County, Wyoming, 43°23′06″N 109°51′17″W, el. 10,128 feet (3,087 m)
- Gunsight Pass, Teton County, Wyoming, 43°36′56″N 110°15′58″W, el. 9,216 feet (2,809 m)
- Gunsight Pass, Lincoln County, Wyoming, 42°53′38″N 110°36′21″W, el. 10,020 feet (3,050 m)
- Haily Pass, Sublette County, Wyoming, 42°50′47″N 109°17′19″W, el. 11,178 feet (3,407 m)
- Hat Pass, Sublette County, Wyoming, 42°57′16″N 109°31′46″W, el. 10,882 feet (3,317 m)
- Hay Pass, Fremont County, Wyoming, 43°00′38″N 109°30′14″W, el. 10,964 feet (3,342 m)
- Hazenville Pass, Converse County, Wyoming, 42°42′55″N 105°33′56″W, el. 5,764 feet (1,757 m)
- Hell Gap, Goshen County, Wyoming, 42°23′54″N 104°38′30″W, el. 5,033 feet (1,534 m)
- Hoff Gap, Natrona County, Wyoming, 42°55′49″N 107°22′26″W, el. 6,332 feet (1,930 m)
- Hurricane Pass, Teton County, Wyoming, 43°43′42″N 110°51′03″W, el. 10,338 feet (3,151 m)
- Indian Gap, Sweetwater County, Wyoming, 42°02′40″N 109°05′40″W, el. 7,379 feet (2,249 m)
- Indian Pass, Fremont County, Wyoming, 43°09′52″N 109°28′01″W, el. 11,712 feet (3,570 m)
- Indian Pass, Fremont County, Wyoming, 43°06′39″N 109°35′16″W, el. 12,126 feet (3,696 m)
- Indian Pass, Fremont County, Wyoming, 43°09′54″N 109°32′48″W, el. 11,571 feet (3,527 m)
- Indian Pass, Park County, Wyoming, 44°29′14″N 109°06′29″W, el. 5,377 feet (1,639 m)
- Ishawooa Pass, Park County, Wyoming, 44°13′00″N 109°47′33″W, el. 9,928 feet (3,026 m)
- Jackass Pass, Fremont County, Wyoming, 42°46′10″N 109°12′38″W, el. 10,797 feet (3,291 m)
- Jackass Pass, Teton County, Wyoming, 44°01′42″N 110°52′23″W, el. 8,501 feet (2,591 m)
- Jenkins Pass, Converse County, Wyoming, 42°28′44″N 105°37′11″W, el. 7,349 feet (2,240 m)
- Johnson Canyon, Platte County, Wyoming, 42°14′48″N 105°12′04″W, el. 5,302 feet (1,616 m)
- Johnson Gap, Sweetwater County, Wyoming, 41°58′55″N 109°00′31″W, el. 7,903 feet (2,409 m)
- Jones Pass, Park County, Wyoming, 44°32′07″N 110°10′10″W, el. 9,655 feet (2,943 m)

== See also ==
- List of mountain passes in Wyoming (K–Y)
