= Death Canyon Shelf =

Plateau in Grand Teton National Park, US

Coordinates: 43°40′03″N 110°53′33″W

Death Canyon Shelf is a narrow plateau located in Grand Teton National Park in the U.S. state of Wyoming. The plateau extends from Fox Creek Pass to Mount Meek Pass, a distance of almost 4 miles (6.4 km). The Death Canyon Shelf parallels much of Death Canyon to the east and has cliffs rising several hundred feet to the west for most of the shelf's length. Camping is permitted on Death Canyon Shelf with a permit. The shelf is traversed by the Teton Crest Trail for its entire length, but it is deep in the backcountry, requiring a 10-mile (16 km) hike from the Death Canyon trailhead to access.

== See also ==
- Geology of the Grand Teton area
