= Hurricane Pass =

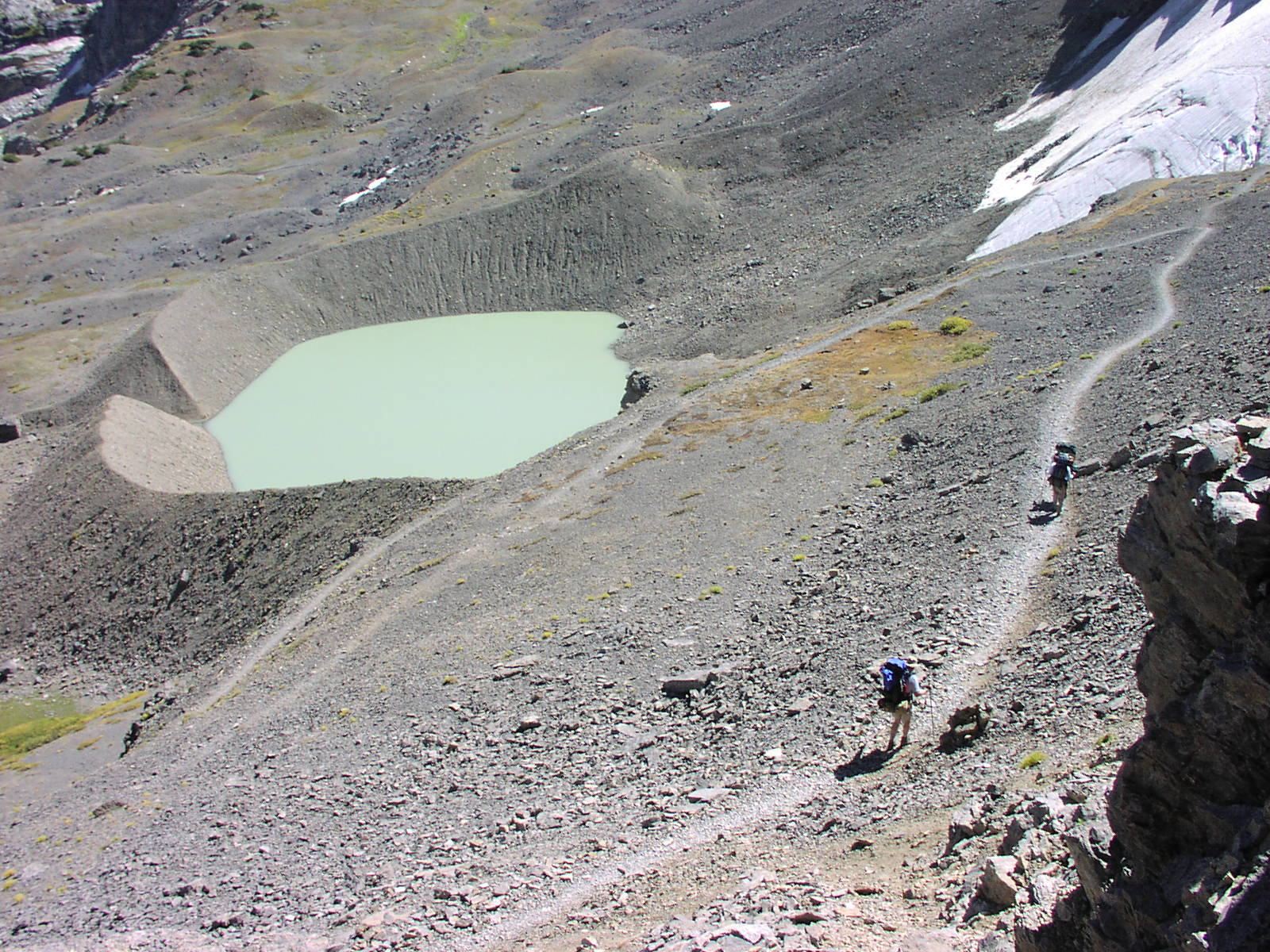
- Schoolroom Glacier from Hurricane Pass

- Location within Wyoming
- Elevation: 10,338 ft (3,151 m)
- Traversed by: Teton Crest Trail; Cascade Canyon Trail

Third Approach
- Location: Teton County, Wyoming, United States
- Range: Teton Range, Rocky Mountains
- Coordinates: 43°43′42″N 110°51′03″W
- Topo map: USGS Grand Teton, WY

Hurricane Pass is a pedestrian mountain pass located in the Teton Range, Grand Teton National Park, in the U.S. state of Wyoming. Situated at approximately 10,338 ft (3,151 m) above sea level, the pass can be accessed from the south by way of the Teton Crest Trail or from the north via the South Fork Cascade Canyon Trail. From Jenny Lake the roundtrip hike is 24.8 mi (39.9 km) with a 4,500 ft (1,400 m) elevation gain. Schoolroom Glacier is 100 yd (91 m) from the pass. Views of the west slopes of several of the highest Teton Range peaks as well as Alaska Basin and Battleship Mountain in Caribou-Targhee National Forest are available at the pass.
