= Alaska Basin Trail =

Hiking trail in Wyoming, United States

Coordinates: 43°42′15″N 110°51′50″W

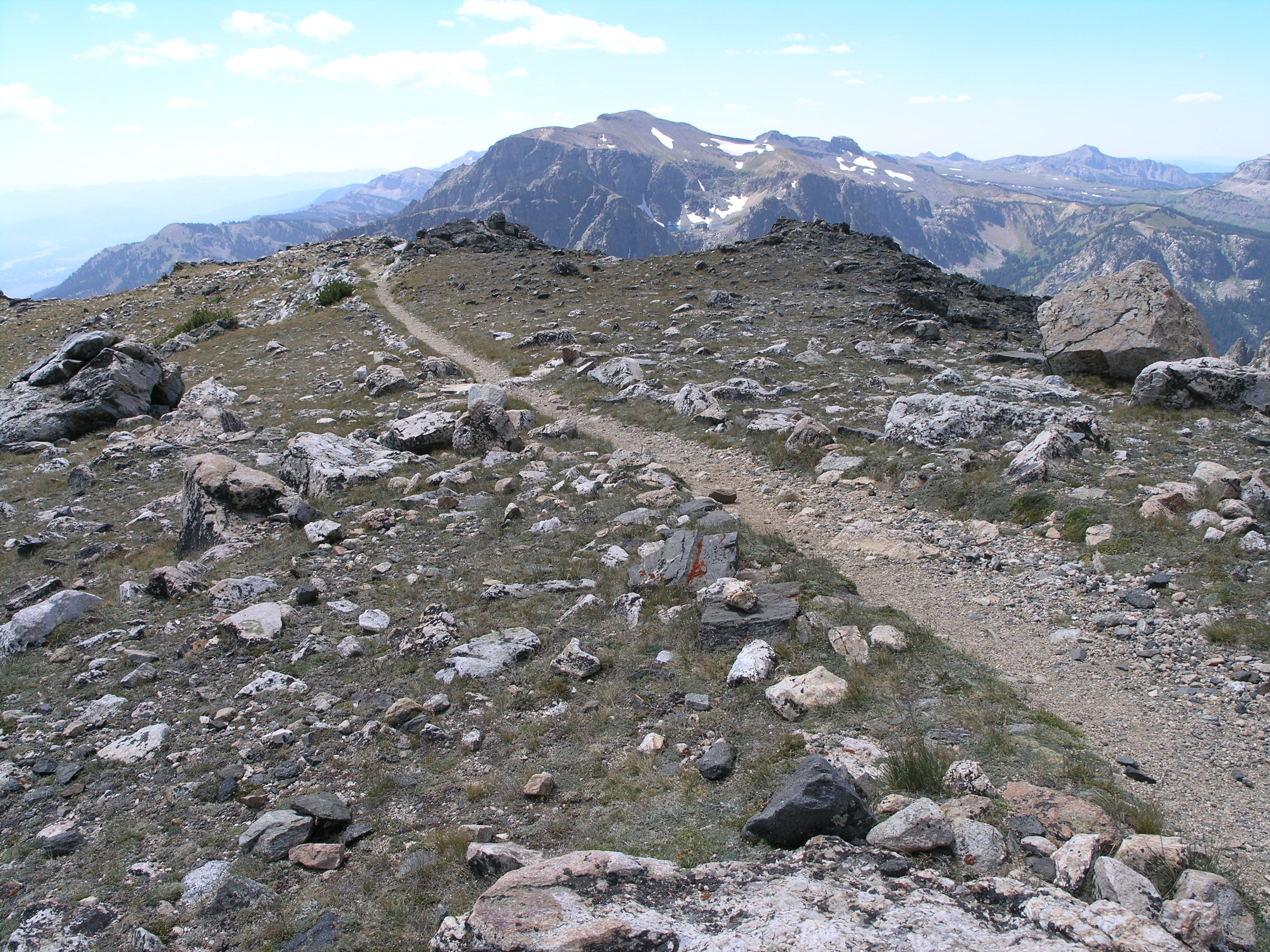
- Looking south near Static Peak Divide
- Length: 7.5 mi (12.1 km)
- Location: Teton Range
- Trailheads: Death Canyon Trail; Teton Crest Trail
- Use: Hiking/Pack animals
- Elevation change: Approximate gain of 3,000 ft (910 m)
- Highest point: Static Peak Divide, 10,800 ft (3,300 m)
- Lowest point: Death Canyon Trail junction, 7,800 ft (2,400 m)
- Difficulty: Strenuous
- Season: Summer to Fall
- Sights: Teton Range
- Hazards: Severe weather Grizzly bears

The Alaska Basin Trail is a 7.5 mi (12.1 km) long hiking trail in Grand Teton National Park and Bridger-Teton National Forest in the U.S. state of Wyoming. The trail begins at a junction on the Death Canyon Trail near the Death Canyon Barn and climbs steeply to Static Peak Divide. From the divide, the trail soon splits with a western branch descending into Alaska Basin and the eastern trail (also known as the Alaska Basin Shelf Trail) continuing north to junction with the Teton Crest Trail. There are no camping zones on the trail within Grand Teton National Park, however in National Forest lands within Alaska Basin, camping is permitted anywhere more than 200 ft (61 m) away from lakes, though no open fires are allowed. The Alaska Basin Trail is oftentimes used by climbers attempting to make ascents of Buck Mountain and Veiled Peak.

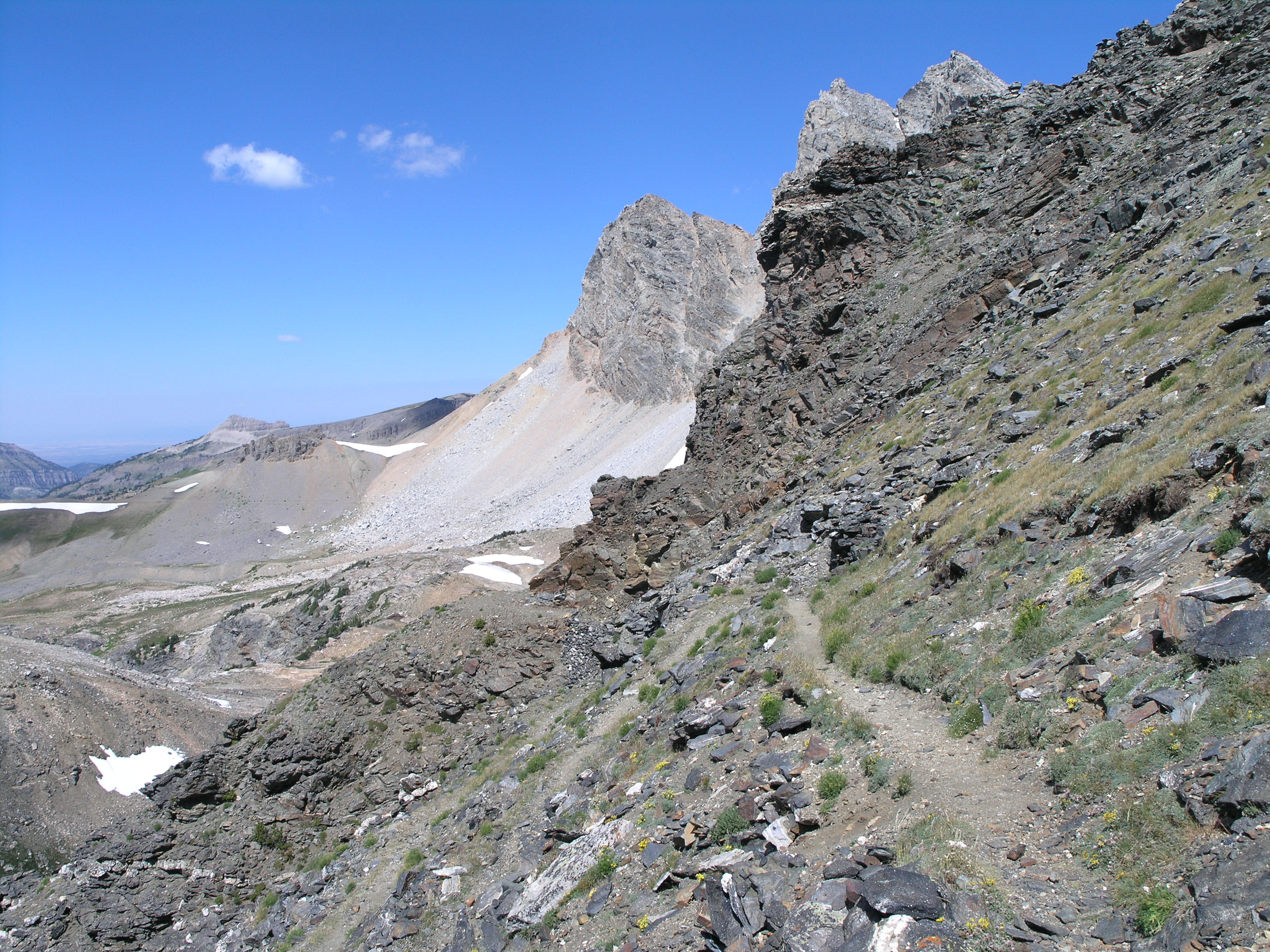
Looking north from Static Peak Divide. Alaska basin is to the left and Grand Teton is in the background at upper right.

== See also ==
- List of hiking trails in Grand Teton National Park
