= Mount Meek =

Mountain in the state of Wyoming

- Location within Wyoming Location within the United States

Highest point
- Elevation: 10,686 ft (3,257 m)
- Prominence: 631 ft (192 m)
- Coordinates: 43°41′09″N 110°52′56″W

Geography
- Location: Grand Teton National Park, Caribou-Targhee National Forest, Teton County, Wyoming, U.S.
- Parent range: Teton Range
- Topo map: USGS Mount Bannon

Climbing
- Easiest route: Scramble

Mount Meek (10,686 feet (3,257 m)) is located in the Teton Range, on the border of Caribou-Targhee National Forest and Grand Teton National Park, U.S. state of Wyoming. Mount Meek is west of Mount Meek Pass and about .53 miles (0.85 km) ENE of Mount Jedediah Smith.
