= Death Canyon Barn =

- U.S. National Register of Historic Places
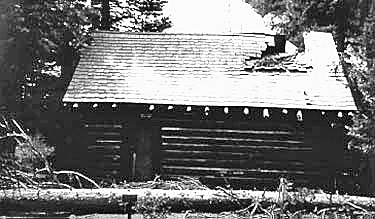

- Location within Wyoming Location within the United States
- Nearest city: Moose, Wyoming
- Coordinates: 43°39′53″N 110°49′45″W
- Built: 1945
- Architectural style: National Park Service Rustic
- MPS: Grand Teton National Park MPS
- NRHP reference No.: 98001024
- Added to NRHP: August 25, 1998

The Death Canyon Barn is a combination barn and ranger patrol cabin in Grand Teton National Park. The barn was built in Death Canyon on the Death Canyon Trail at its junction with the Alaska Basin Trail by the Civilian Conservation Corps in 1935 in the National Park Service rustic style. Located with a clear view of Prospector Mountain, it shares a common style and purpose with the Cascade Canyon Barn to the north in the park, with minor differences attributable to available materials and the preferences of the work crews building the barns.

== History ==
The 1 1/2 story log building was designed by the National Park Service Branch of Plans and Design. Built as a barn, it became a patrol cabin in 1945. It was built by workers from CCC Hot Springs Camp #NP-3 or Jenny Lake Camp #NP-4, working out of the Phelps Lake Spike Camp. A proposed cabin to house trail maintenance tools and personnel was never completed, so the barn was converted to that purpose shortly after the CCC was dissolved. In the 1950s it briefly housed a seasonal ranger station.

== Design ==
The rustic log cabin features saddle-notched log corners on a stone foundation. The foundation is buttressed at the corners to support the projecting log ends, a feature typical of Park Service designs of the era. The original wide barn door has been filled in with windows and a personnel door. The interior consists of a large main room with a small tack room in the southwest corner, now used for tool storage. The partition uses vertical poles faced with 4-1/2: wide tongue and groove planks. A loft is framed with logs and 8" rough-cut decking, reached by a milled-lumber stairway. The loft deck is covered with 6" wide flooring planks. The roof structure is open to the underside of the roof, with exposed log trusses.The hayloft was converted to a sleeping loft. The furnishings include a rodent-proof food storage bock and a propane stove. The adjoining corral enclosure is listed as a contributing feature, with standing trees supporting most of the fence enclosure.

The Death Canyon Barn was listed on the National Register of Historic Places on August 25, 1998.

== See also ==
- Historical buildings and structures of Grand Teton National Park
