= Static Peak =

Mountain in Wyoming, United States

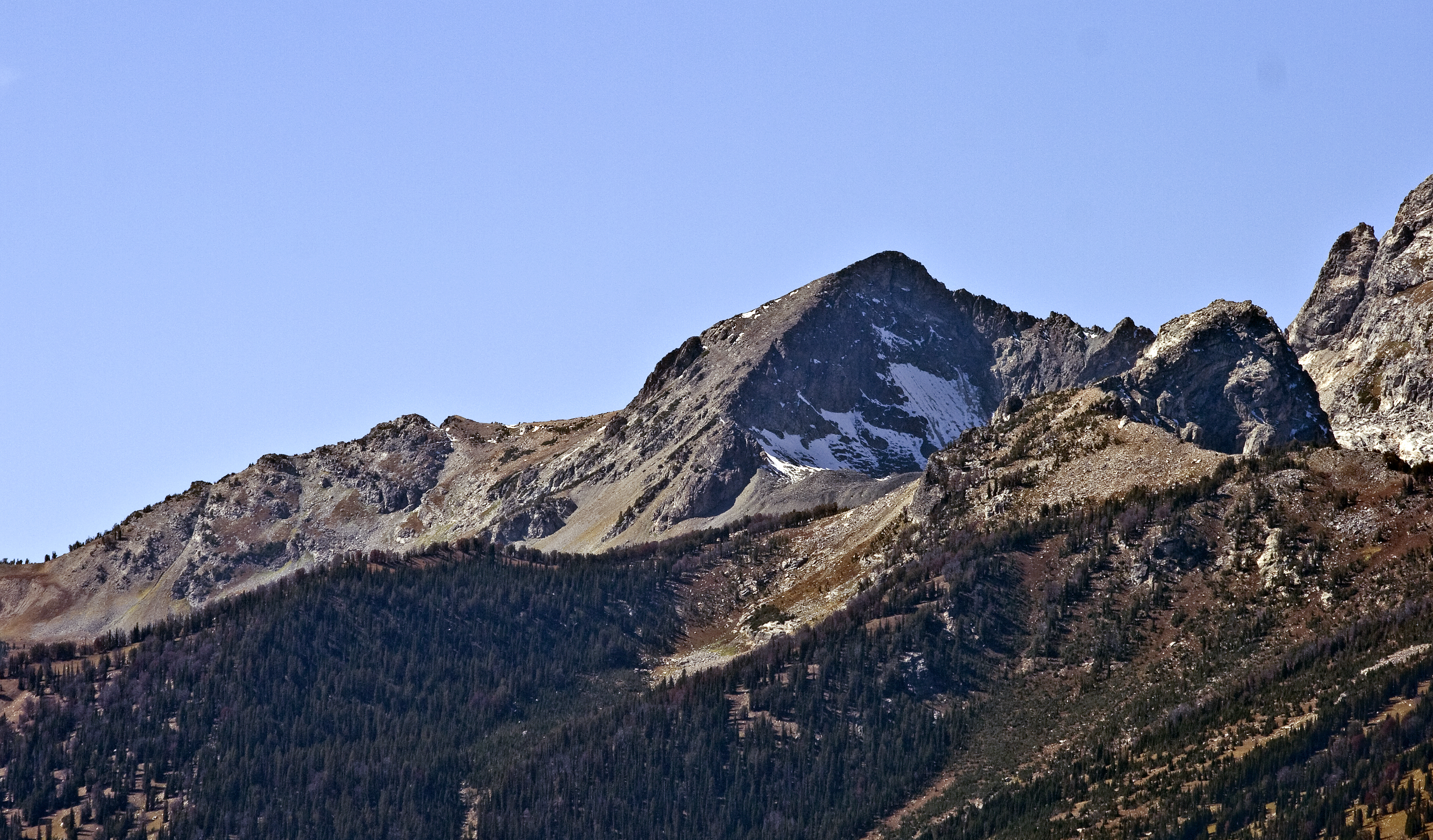
- Static Peak

Highest point
- Elevation: 11,308 ft (3,447 m)
- Prominence: 343 ft (105 m)
- Coordinates: 43°40′58″N 110°48′58″W

Geography
- Location within Wyoming Location within the United States
- Location: Grand Teton National Park, Teton County, Wyoming, U.S.
- Parent range: Teton Range
- Topo map: USGS Grand Teton

Climbing
- Easiest route: Scramble/Technical class 3 to 5.8

Static Peak (11,308 feet (3,447 m)) is located in the Teton Range, Grand Teton National Park, in the U.S. state of Wyoming. Located .48 miles (0.77 km) southeast of Buck Mountain, the summit is also east of the Alaska Basin Trail, from a point known as Static Peak Divide, the summit can be climbed in a scramble. Below the summit on the north face, a small remnant glacier persists, sheltered from direct sunlight by steep cliffs. Timberline Lake lies to the north of the peak. On April 1, 2025, an April Fool’s story was published suggesting Static Peak would be renamed in honor of Grizzly 399.
