= Battleship Mountain =

Mountain in the state of Wyoming

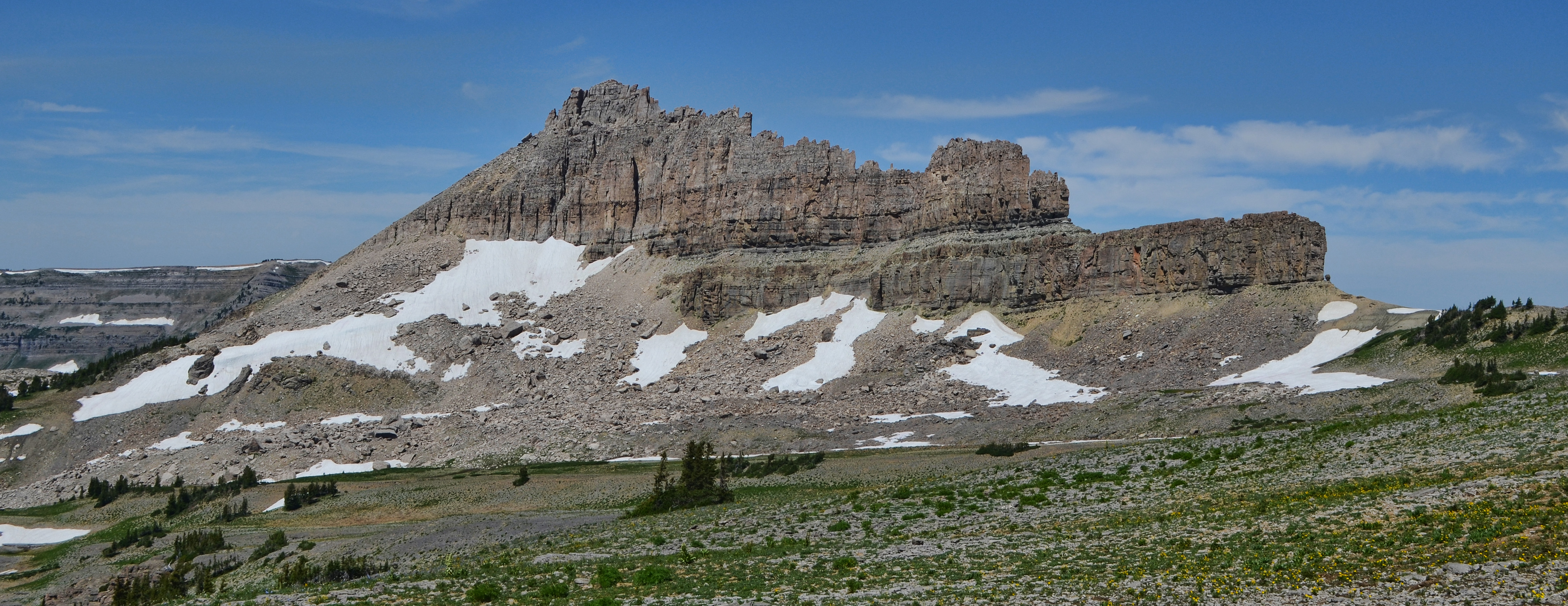
- Battleship Mountain

Highest point
- Elevation: 10,679 ft (3,255 m)
- Prominence: 359 ft (109 m)
- Coordinates: 43°43′24″N 110°52′09″W

Geography
- Location within Wyoming Location within the United States
- Location: Caribou-Targhee National Forest, Teton County, Wyoming, U.S.
- Parent range: Teton Range
- Topo map: USGS Grand Teton

Climbing
- Easiest route: Scramble

Battleship Mountain (10,679 feet (3,255 m) is located in the Teton Range in the U.S. state of Wyoming. The peak is in the Jedediah Smith Wilderness of Caribou-Targhee National Forest and is west of Hurricane Pass.
