= Mount Meek Pass =

Mountain pass in the state of Wyoming

- Location within Wyoming
- Elevation: 9,718 ft (2,962 m)
- Traversed by: Teton Crest Trail

Third Approach
- Location: Teton County, Wyoming, United States
- Range: Teton Range, Rocky Mountains
- Coordinates: 43°41′03″N 110°52′29″W
- Topo map: USGS Grand Teton, WY

Mount Meek Pass is a pedestrian mountain pass located in the Teton Range, Grand Teton National Park, in the U.S. state of Wyoming. The pass is situated at 9,718 ft (2,962 m) above sea level and is accessed by way of the Teton Crest Trail and is immediately east of Mount Meek. Mount Meek Pass is more than 12 mi (19 km) from the nearest trailhead. To the south of the pass lies Death Canyon Shelf within Grand Teton National Park, while to the north can be found the region known as Alaska Basin, which is in Caribou-Targhee National Forest.
