= Cascade Canyon Barn =

- U.S. National Register of Historic Places
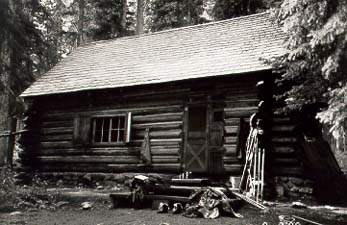

- Location within Wyoming Location within the United States
- Nearest city: Moose, Wyoming
- Coordinates: 43°46′3″N 110°49′7″W
- Built: 1935
- Architect: Civilian Conservation Corps
- Architectural style: National Park Service Rustic
- MPS: Grand Teton National Park MPS
- NRHP reference No.: 98001023
- Added to NRHP: August 18, 1998

The Cascade Canyon Barn was designed by the National Park Service to standard plans and built by the Civilian Conservation Corps in 1935. The National Park Service rustic style barn is 5 miles (8 km) west of Jenny Lake in Grand Teton National Park in the U.S. state of Wyoming.

The rustic log cabin features saddle-notched log corners on a stone foundation. The foundation is buttressed at the corners to support the projecting log ends, a feature typical of Park Service designs of the era. The original wide barn door has been filled in with windows and a personnel door. The interior consists of a large main room with a small tack room in the southwest corner, now used for tool storage. The partition uses vertical poles faced with 4-1/2: wide tongue and groove planks. The room is furnished with built-in cupboards and a wood-burning cookstove. A loft is framed with logs and 8" rough-cut decking, reached by a milled-lumber stairway. The loft deck is covered with 6" wide flooring planks. The roof structure is open to the underside of the roof, with exposed log trusses.

Positioned deep in Cascade Canyon, the cabin was originally used as a barn, but after an avalanche destroyed the Cascade Canyon patrol cabin in 1960, the barn was converted to a patrol cabin. It shares a common design and purpose with the Death Canyon Barn to the south in the park, with minor differences attributable to available materials and the preferences of the work crews building the barns. Crews from either CCC Hot Springs camp NP3 or Jenny Lake Camp NP 4 built the barn. On August 18, 1998, the barn was listed on the National Register of Historic Places.

== See also ==
- Historical buildings and structures of Grand Teton National Park
