= Mount Jedediah Smith =

Mountain in Wyoming, United States

- Location within Wyoming Location within the United States

Highest point
- Elevation: 10,615 ft (3,235 m)
- Prominence: 450 ft (140 m)
- Coordinates: 43°40′56″N 110°53′31″W

Geography
- Location: Grand Teton National Park and Caribou-Targhee National Forest, Teton County, Wyoming, U.S.
- Parent range: Teton Range
- Topo map: USGS Mount Bannon

Climbing
- Easiest route: Scramble

Mount Jedediah Smith (10,615 feet (3,235 m) is located in the Teton Range, on the border of Caribou-Targhee National Forest and Grand Teton National Park in the U.S. state of Wyoming. Mount Jedediah Smith is about .53 miles (0.85 km) WSW of Mount Meek.
