= Phillips Pass =

Mountain pass in Teton Range, Wyoming, US

- Location within Wyoming
- Elevation: 8,932 feet (2,722 m)
- Traversed by: Teton Crest Trail

Third Approach
- Location: Teton County, Wyoming, US
- Range: Teton Range, Rocky Mountains
- Coordinates: 43°32′54″N 110°55′56″W
- Topo map: USGS Rendezvous Peak, WY

Phillips Pass is a pedestrian mountain pass located in the Teton Range in the U.S. state of Wyoming. The pass is along the crest of the range and the borders between Bridger-Teton National Forest to the east and Caribou-Targhee National Forest to the west. The pass is traversed by the Teton Crest Trail and can be accessed via trails from Teton Pass to the southwest or the Phillips Canyon Trail to the east.
