= Fox Creek Pass =

Pedestrian mountain pass in Grand Teton National Park, Wyoming, USA

- Location within Wyoming
- Elevation: 9,570 ft (2,920 m)
- Traversed by: Teton Crest Trail; Death Canyon Trail

Third Approach
- Location: Teton County, Wyoming, United States
- Range: Teton Range, Rocky Mountains
- Coordinates: 43°38′47″N 110°54′37″W
- Topo map: USGS Mount Bannon, WY

Fox Creek Pass is a pedestrian mountain pass located in the Teton Range, Grand Teton National Park, in the U.S. state of Wyoming. The pass is situated at 9,570 ft (2,920 m) above sea level and is at the head of Death Canyon. Fox Creek Pass can be accessed by way of the Teton Crest Trail or the Death Canyon Trail from the east. To the north lies the Death Canyon Shelf in Grand Teton National Park while Fossil Mountain and Caribou-Targhee National Forest are to the west and south, respectively.
