= Horace M. Albright =

American conservationist (1890-1987)

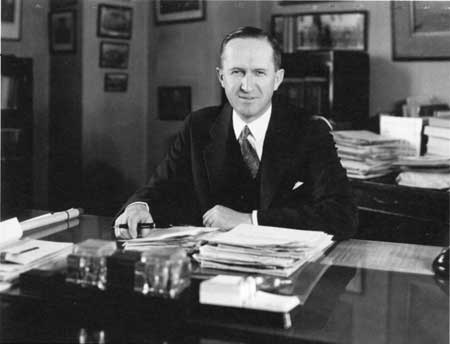

2nd Director of the National Park Service
- In office January 12, 1929 – August 9, 1933
- President: Calvin Coolidge; Herbert Hoover; Franklin D. Roosevelt
- Preceded by: Stephen Mather
- Succeeded by: Arno B. Cammerer

Personal details
- Born: January 6, 1890 Bishop, California, U.S.
- Died: March 28, 1987 (aged 97) Van Nuys, California, U.S.
- Spouse: Grace Noble
- Children: 2
- Occupation: Conservationist
- Awards: Audubon Medal; Berkeley Citation; Presidential Medal of Freedom

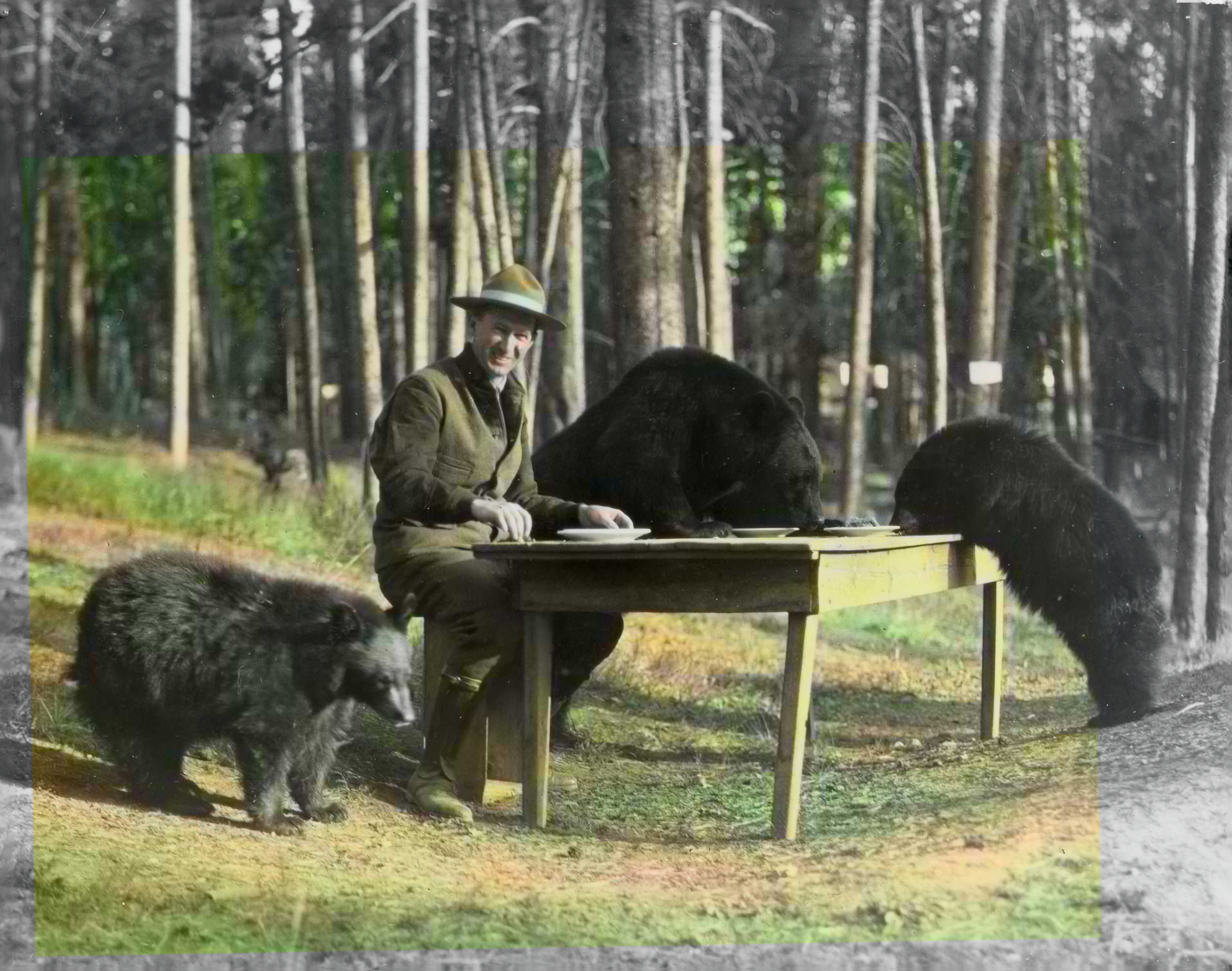
Albright enjoys a "bear dinner", Yellowstone National Park, 1922

Horace Marden Albright (January 6, 1890 – March 28, 1987) was an American conservationist and the second director of the National Park Service. He played a key role in shaping the early National Park System and expanding its mission to include the preservation of historic sites.

== Early life and education ==
Horace Albright was born in 1890 in Bishop, California, the son of George Albright, a miner. He graduated from the University of California, Berkeley in 1912, and earned a law degree from Georgetown University in 1914. Albright married his college classmate Grace Noble and they had two children.

== Early career ==
After graduation, he worked for the Department of the Interior in Washington, D.C. Albright worked as a lawyer until being introduced to Stephen Mather who took him on as an assistant. When Mather became Assistant Secretary in charge of the national parks, Albright assisted Mather when the National Park Service (NPS) was established in 1916. As legal assistant, he helped acquire land for several new national parks in the east. After the first year and a half of being a part of the newly created park service, Albright created a list of management policies that were looked over by a wide group of people including conservationists which was sent to NPS director Mather by Franklin Lane in what is called the "Lane Letter". When Mather suffered a nervous breakdown in 1917, Albright served as acting director of the NPS and managed its operations during his recovery.

In the early years of the national parks idea, Horace Albright and Stephen Mather focused on getting people to come to the parks which influenced Albright's policies related to the preservation and use of the parks. Together, they also pushed for expanded park boundaries to accommodate more wildlife habitat and, in the case of Yellowstone National Park, added the Grand Teton mountain range as a visitor attraction to complement Yellowstone National Park.

He later served as superintendent of Yellowstone National Park from 1919 to 1929. He viewed Yellowstone as the flagship of the National Park Service and worked to make it a model for park management. During his tenure, he established visitor services and park museums, which became foundational elements of the National Park Service. His leadership in Yellowstone set standards that influenced the management of other national parks. In the early years of being superintendent, Albright would get the support of John D. Rockefeller Jr. who bought land around the Teton Mountain range to preserve it and eventually make a park. He would also be a key person who helped preserve the culture and lands of Jackson Hole town which helped the community support the creation of the Grand Teton park idea.

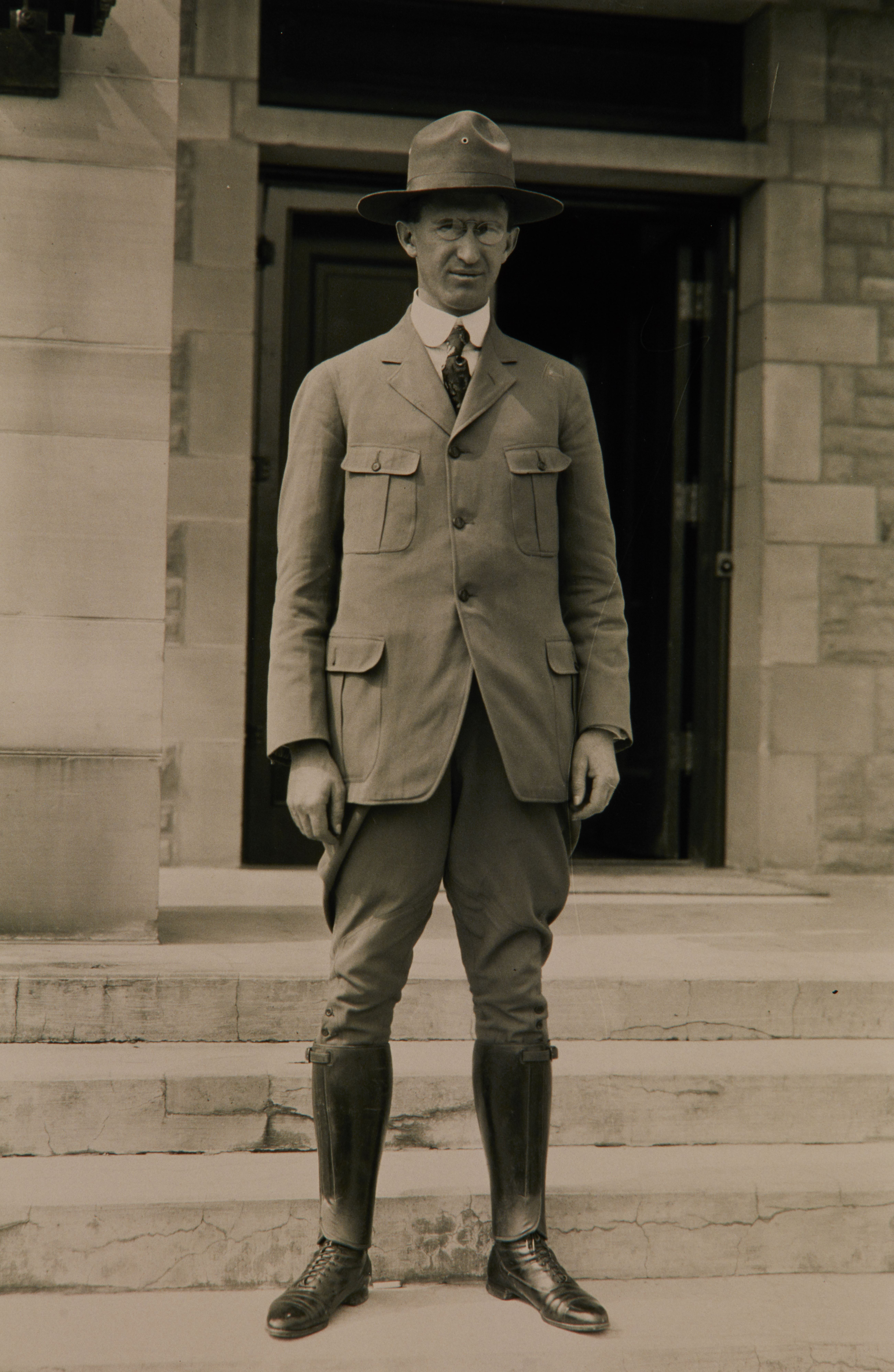
Horace Albright as Superintendent of Yellowstone

For a short time he served as superintendent of Yosemite National Park. On October 18, 1922, he was elected Associate Member of the Boone and Crockett Club, a wildlife conservation organization founded by Theodore Roosevelt and George Bird Grinnell, in 1887.

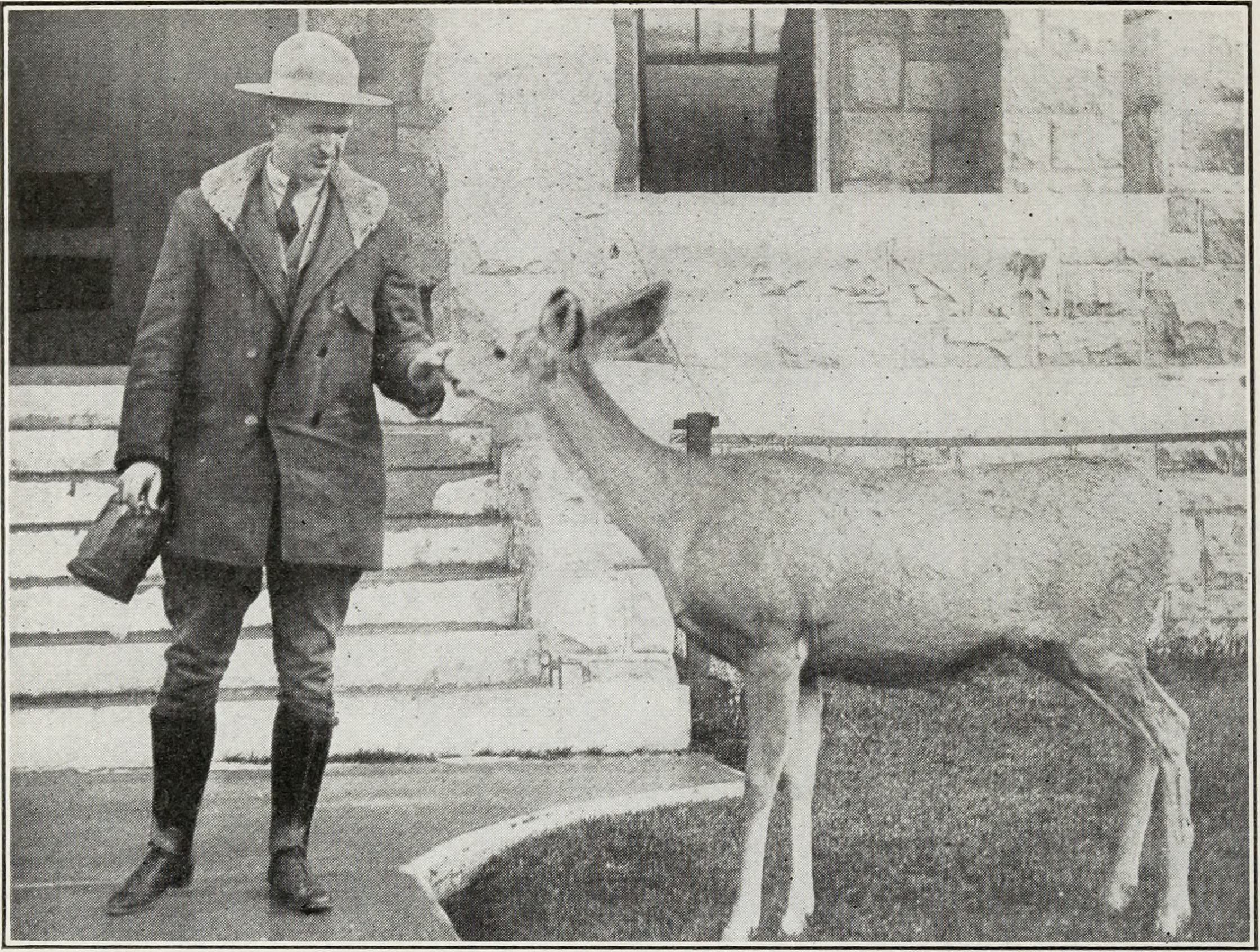
Horace M. Albright, Superintendent of Yellowstone, 1922

== Director of NPS ==
On January 12, 1929, Albright succeeded Mather as the second director of the NPS and held the post until August 9, 1933. As the new director of the NPS, Albright advocated that the preservation of animals should still have ways in which to make interactions with the visitors possible. This view was opposed by many biologists such as George Melendez Wright at Yellowstone National Park, where this practice had animals such as bison being seen as more of a tourist attraction compared to the other wildlife at the park. Albright would continue to put visitor use over biological concerns when they came up as he saw the parks being more for the people rather than the animals both during his time as director and after.

Albright was instrumental in transferring historical sites and military parks from the War Department to the Interior Department with the National Park Service. He did this by saying that the NPS had more administrative freedom than the War Department and that they were more accustomed to doing interpretation and educational work. This move broadened the agency's mission to include cultural and historical preservation alongside natural conservation.

Along with adding historical military sites, Albright also helped create and develop a history program for the National Park Service. He appointed Verne E. Chatelain as the service's first Chief Historian, and one of their early achievements was establishing the National Historical Park at Morristown. Additionally, the first Branch of Research and Education was created under Albright to help collect data about the various wildlife and natural resources in order to develop facilities to educate visitors and expand the known knowledge of the park. In 1931, Albright decided to place a limit on overnight visitors to facilities located in the Giant Forest in Sequoia National Park which added preservation concerns alongside the tourism concerns.

During his time as Director of the National Parks, Albright was instrumental in adding new national parks such as the Everglades, Great Smoky Mountains, and the Grand Tetons. When Albright was invited in 1930 to the Everglades to see the place that different groups of people wanted to either preserve or destroy, he decided at the end of the trip to put forth the concept of it becoming a national park although it would take a few years.

== Late Life ==
After leaving the National Park Service in 1933, he next worked for the U.S. Potash Corporation and U.S. Borax and Chemical Corporation, serving variously as director, vice president, and general manager. During this time, the Albrights lived in New Rochelle, New York. In 1937, Albright's portrait was painted by artist Herbert A. Collins. Albright retired from the U.S Potash Corporation in 1965, but continued to engage in both conservation and national parks issues.

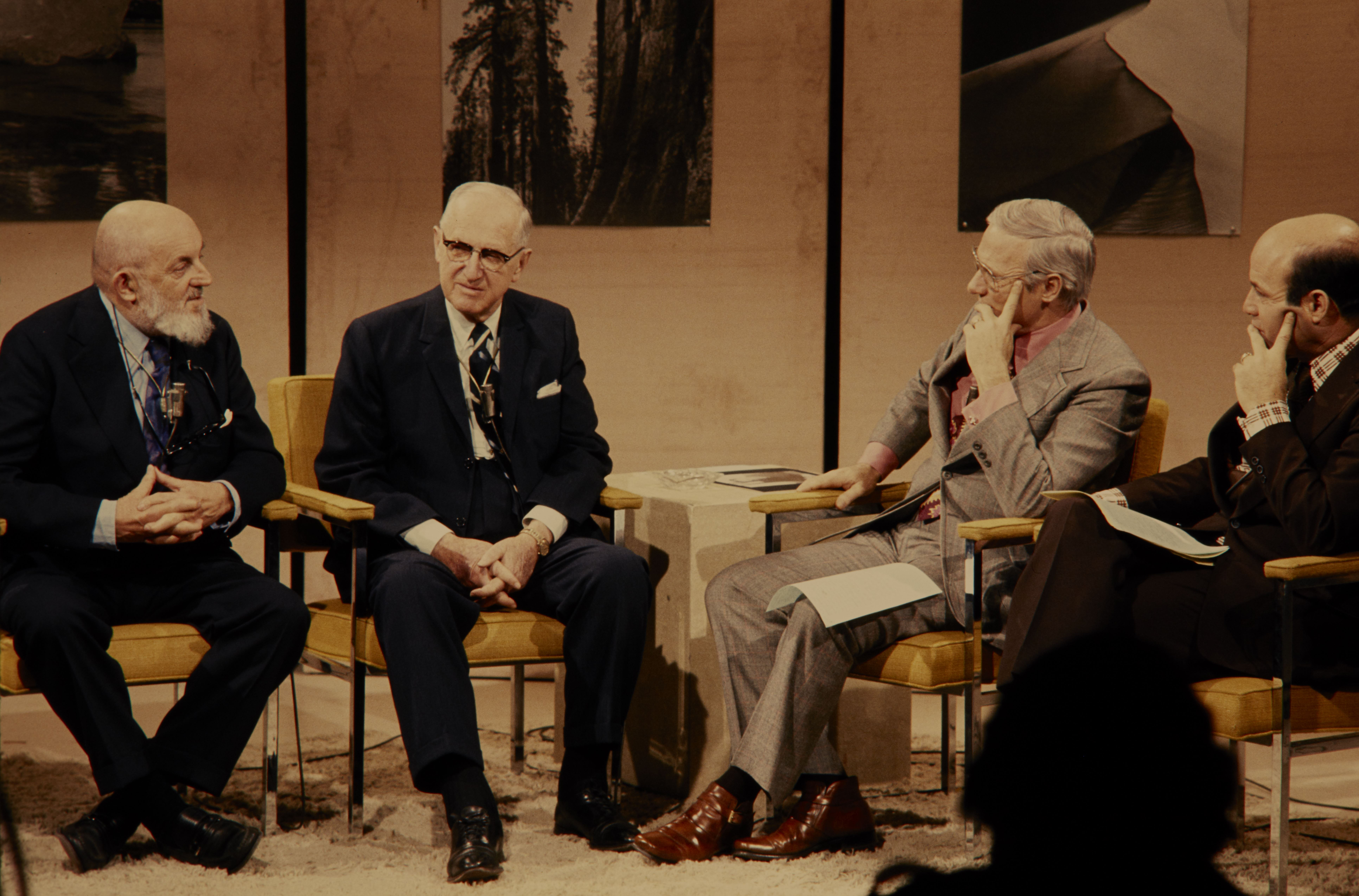
Horace Albright on the 1972 Centennial NBC Today Show

Albright was friends with many U.S presidents. He worked to expedite the signing of the 1916 National Park Service Act by President Woodrow Wilson. In 1985, President Ronald Reagan sent Albright a congratulatory cable for his contributions to conservation and the National Park Service

Albright died of heart failure at age 97 in Van Nuys, California, in 1987. At the time of his death, he was the last surviving member of the group that first founded the National Park Service.

== Legacy ==
In 1969, Albright received the National Audubon Society's highest honor, the Audubon Medal, which recognized his lifelong contribution to conservation and the National Park Movement

On the 64th anniversary of the National Park Service, Albright was honored with the nation's highest civilian award, the Presidential Medal of Freedom. President Jimmy Carter announced the award in August 1980, and Assistant Secretary of the Interior Robert L. Herbst presented it during a ceremony held in Van Nuys, California, on December 8th of that year.

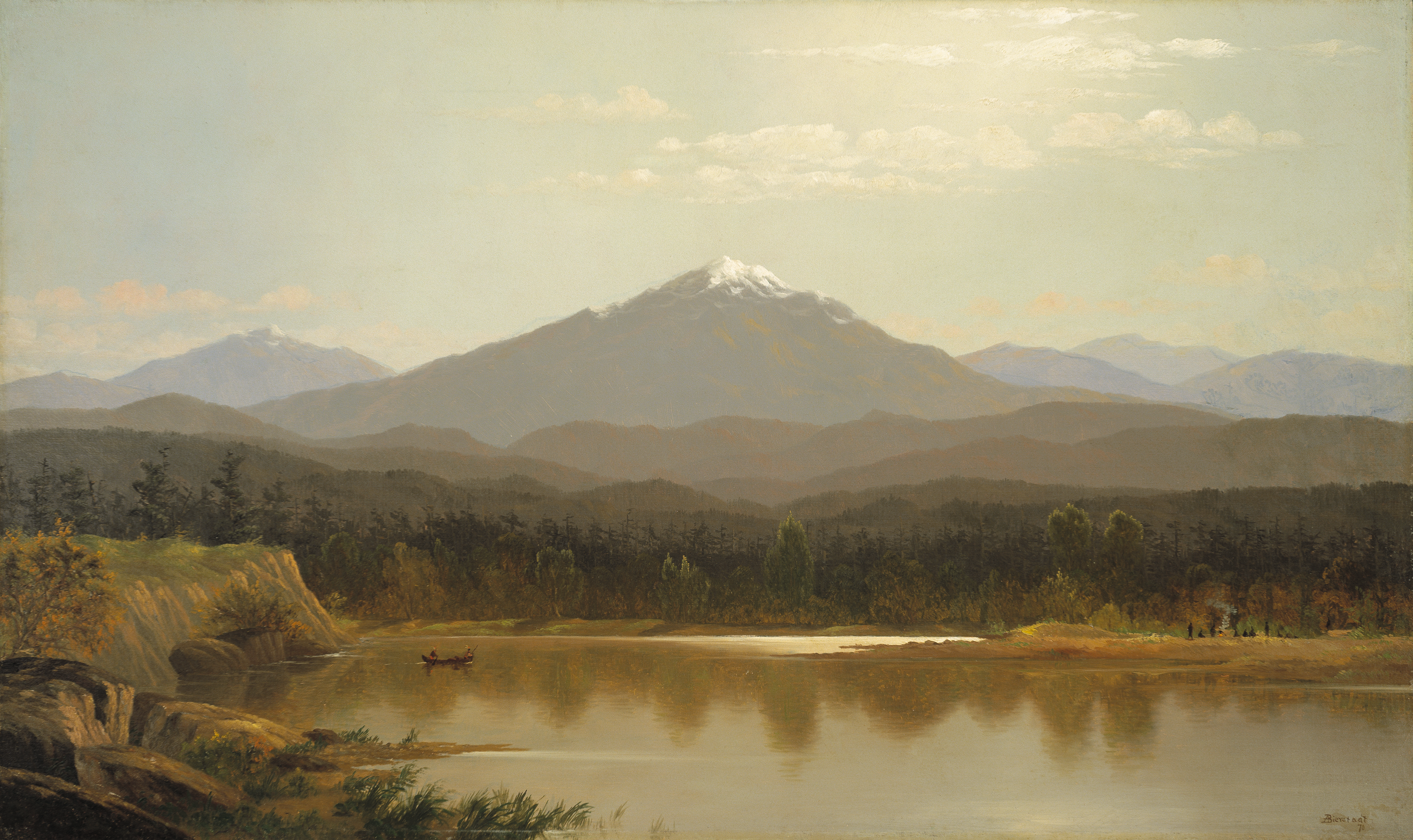
Albright Peak Grand Tetons National Park

Albright Grove, a grove of old-growth hemlocks and tulip poplars located in the Great Smoky Mountains National Park, was named in Albright's honor. The Albright Training Center at Grand Canyon National Park, the Albright Visitor Center at Yellowstone National Park, and Albright Peak in Grand Teton National Park also bear his name.

Government offices
Preceded by Stephen Mather	Director of the National Park Service; 1929–1933	Succeeded by Arno B. Cammerer
