= Gunsight Pass =

Mountain pass in Colorado, USA

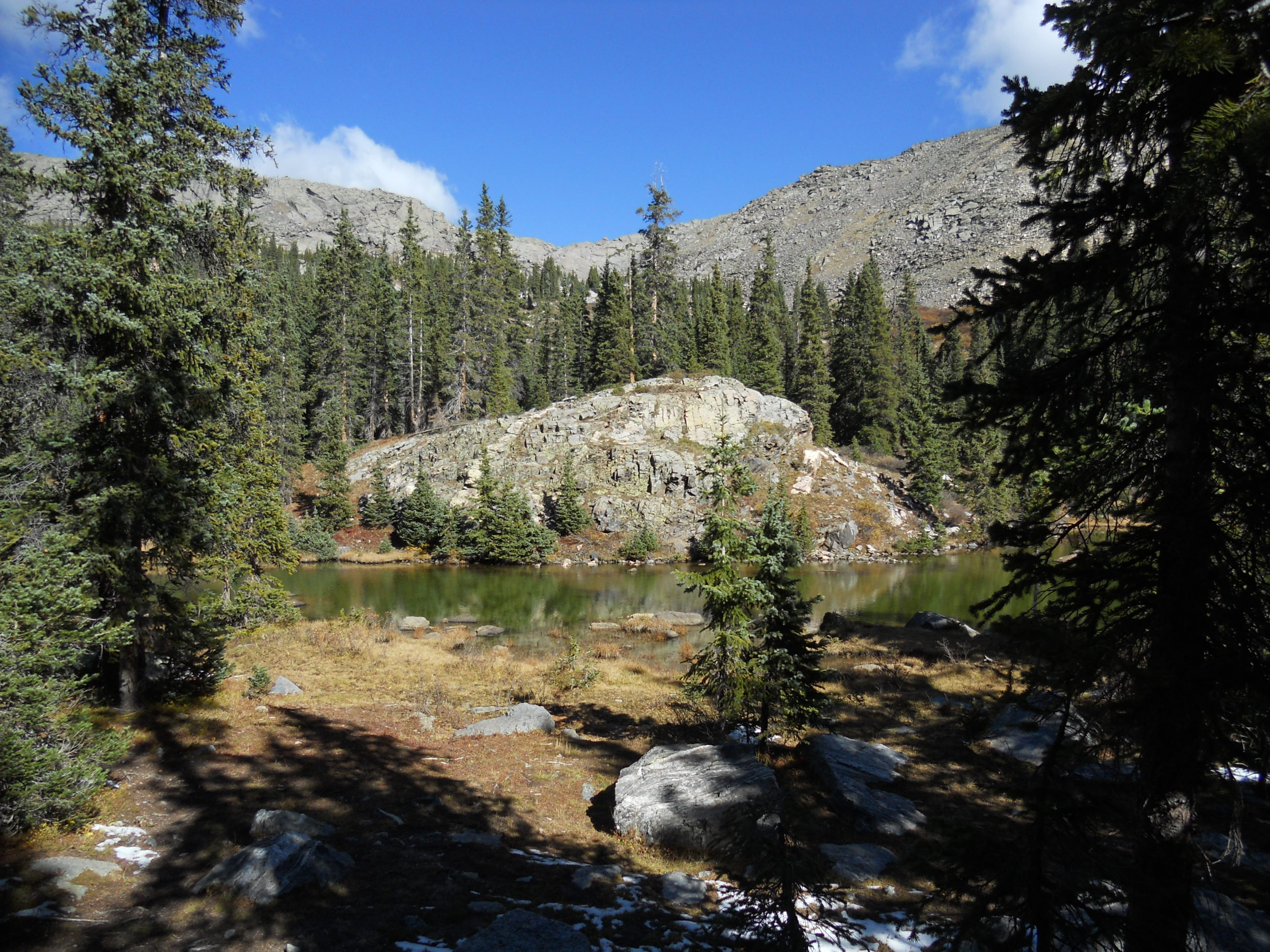
- Gunsight Pass viewed from the south.

- Location within Colorado
- Elevation: 12,185 feet (3,714 m)
- Traversed by: Forest Trail 428

Third Approach
- Location: Gunnison County, Colorado, U.S.
- Range: Sawatch Range
- Coordinates: 38°41′00″N 106°35′59″W
- Topo map: Fairview Peak

Gunsight Pass is a high mountain pass in the Sawatch Range of the Rocky Mountains of Colorado. It is located in Gunnison County and in the Fossil Ridge Wilderness, which is managed by the Gunnison National Forest. The pass is at an elevation of 12,185 feet (3,714 m)) on a ridge connecting Square Top Mountain to the west and Broncho Mountain to the east. It divides the watersheds of Brush Creek to the north and Lamphier Creek to the south.

The pass is traversed by Forest Trail 428, the South Lottis Creek Trail, which is 10.5 miles (16.9 km) long. The trail is accessed from the north at the Lottis Creek Trailhead on Gunnison County Road 742. From the south, the trail is accessed at the Gold Creek Trailhead located on Gunnison County Road 771. The trail lies within the Fossil Ridge Wilderness, and only foot and horse travel are allowed. No permits are required to enter this wilderness area.

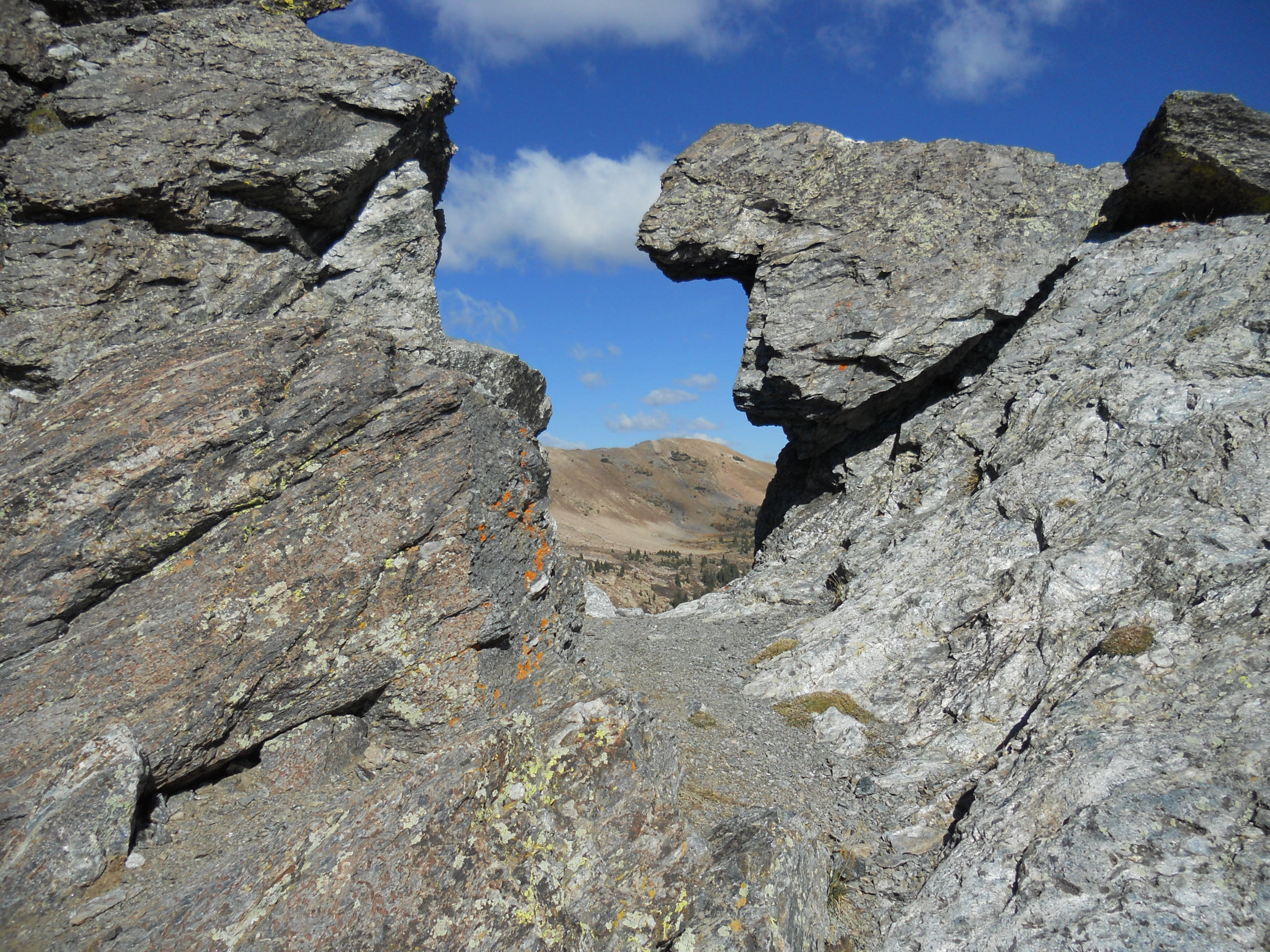
Gunsight Pass showing the small gap that gives the pass its name.

Evidence of Pleistocene glaciation dominates the area around Gunsight Pass. The pass is the low point on an arête that separates two glacial cirques. Moraines are found in the valleys below and the glacial cobble can make hiking along Forest Trail 428 difficult in spots. The ridge itself is composed of Proterozoic metasedimentary and metavolcanic rocks.

In about 1900, area resident John Gardiner blasted a hole in the ridge to allow passage of his pack trains. The resulting notch gives the pass its name.
