= Jackson Hole Aerial Tram =

Aerial tramway in Wyoming, United States

Coordinates: 43°35′15″N 110°49′41″W

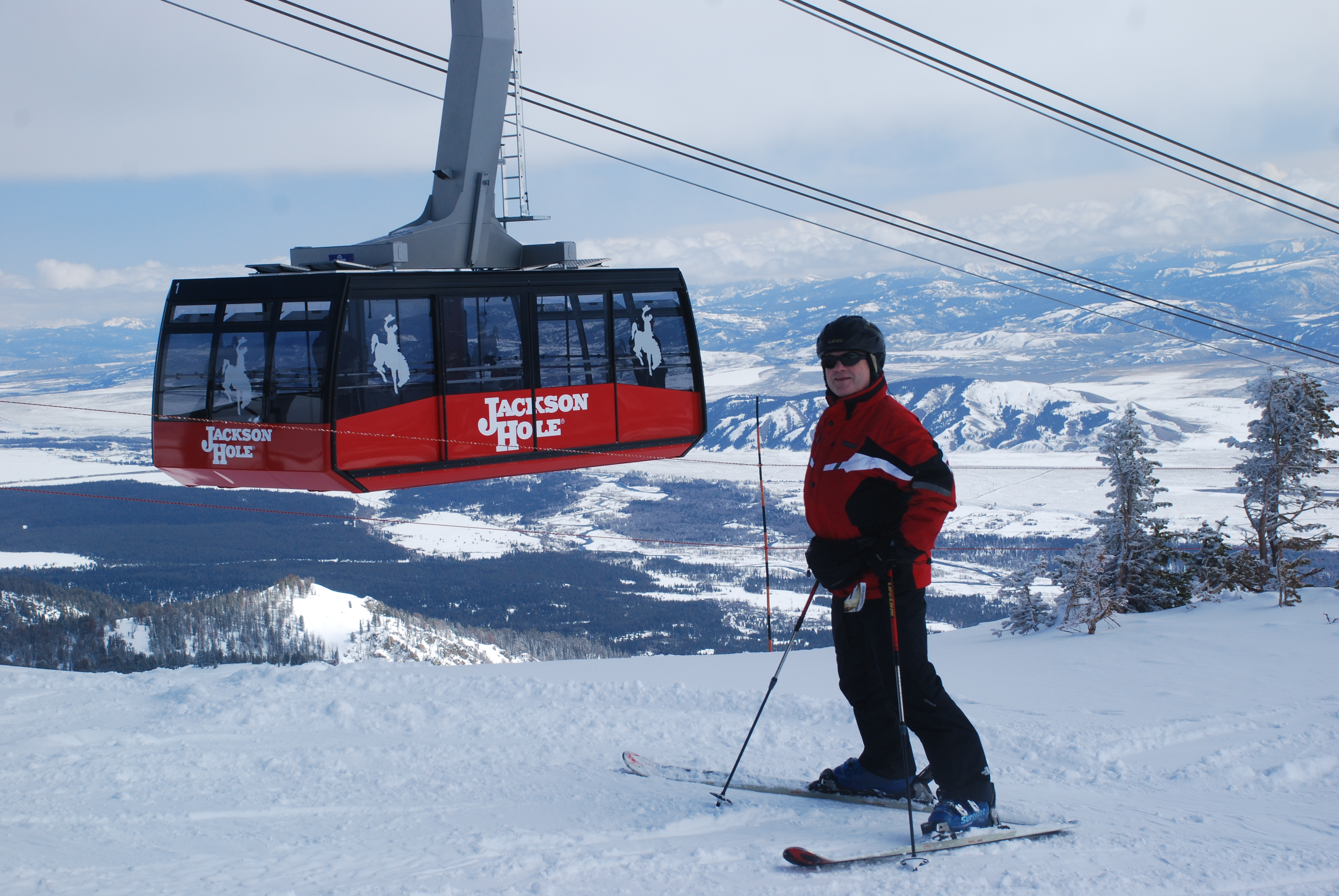
Current tram

The Jackson Hole Aerial Tram (also known as the Musical Tram) is an aerial tramway located at Jackson Hole Mountain Resort in Jackson Hole, Wyoming, and has become an iconic symbol of the Valley. The tram takes people to the top of Rendezvous Mountain, at a summit of 3,185 meters (10,450 feet). The first tram started operation on July 31, 1966, while the second tram started operation on December 20, 2008. The current tram holds 100 skiers and 1 operator in the winter. At 4,000 feet in elevation gain, it is the longest ski lift in North America. The original tram carried 62 skiers and 1 conductor, and took 10.5 minutes

== History ==
=== Original tram ===
The original tram took a total of 26 months to build, from May 1964-July 1966. Its maiden voyage was on July 31, 1966. Just like the current tram, it has 5 Cable towers with tower 1 being the tallest at 65 Meters or 196 ft. It carried 62 skiers and 1 conductor in winter and 45 passengers and 1 conductor in summer to the top in 12 minutes. Still to this day, the trams slows down in the summer for sight seeing. Two thirds of the money for construction in the 1960s came from the federal government. $1 million of a $1.6 million grant came from a government program called Area Redevelopment Administration which proposed to loan funds to seasonally depressed communities.

=== Replacement ===
After 40 years of service, the Kemmerer family (the owners of the resort) decided to retire the tram in September 2005. An inspection revealed that the tram would last for a couple more years, but the family thought it best to decommission it before any safety hazards raised. One of the many problems was that the almost 41 year old cables were starting to unwind and unravel. Designs for the new tram were released and approved in early 2007 with demolition and construction beginning in April of that year, the day after the resort closed for the 2006-2007 ski season. The Austrian company Doppelmayr Garaventa created the five steel towers, terminals and mechanics. In March 2008 the company shipped everything to Houston, Texas, in 50 sea containers. From there, all the components traveled on train or road to Jackson Hole, Wy. Construction was completed on time in December 2008. The original $20 million they thought it was going to take to make the new tram later became $31 million which was completely funded by the resort.

The launch of the new tram happened on December 19, 2008. 20,000 people came to show their support that night.

== Seasons ==
=== Winter ===
In winter, skiers take the tram to the top of the mountain where they are able to ski Rendezvous Mountain as well as out of bounds locations. Many also eat at Corbet's Cabin, which serves World Famous waffles. You pay for your ticket in your ski pass at the ticket office under Resort restaurant RPK 3, originally Nick Wilson's Cafe.

=== Summer ===
In summer, tourists as well as locals take the tram in order to look at the views, where on a clear day you are able to see the town of Jackson, the Jackson hole Valley, Grand Teton National Park, and the summit of the Teton mountains. Many go for sightseeing, paragliding, and hiking.
