= Alaska Basin =

Subarctic basin in Wyoming, United States

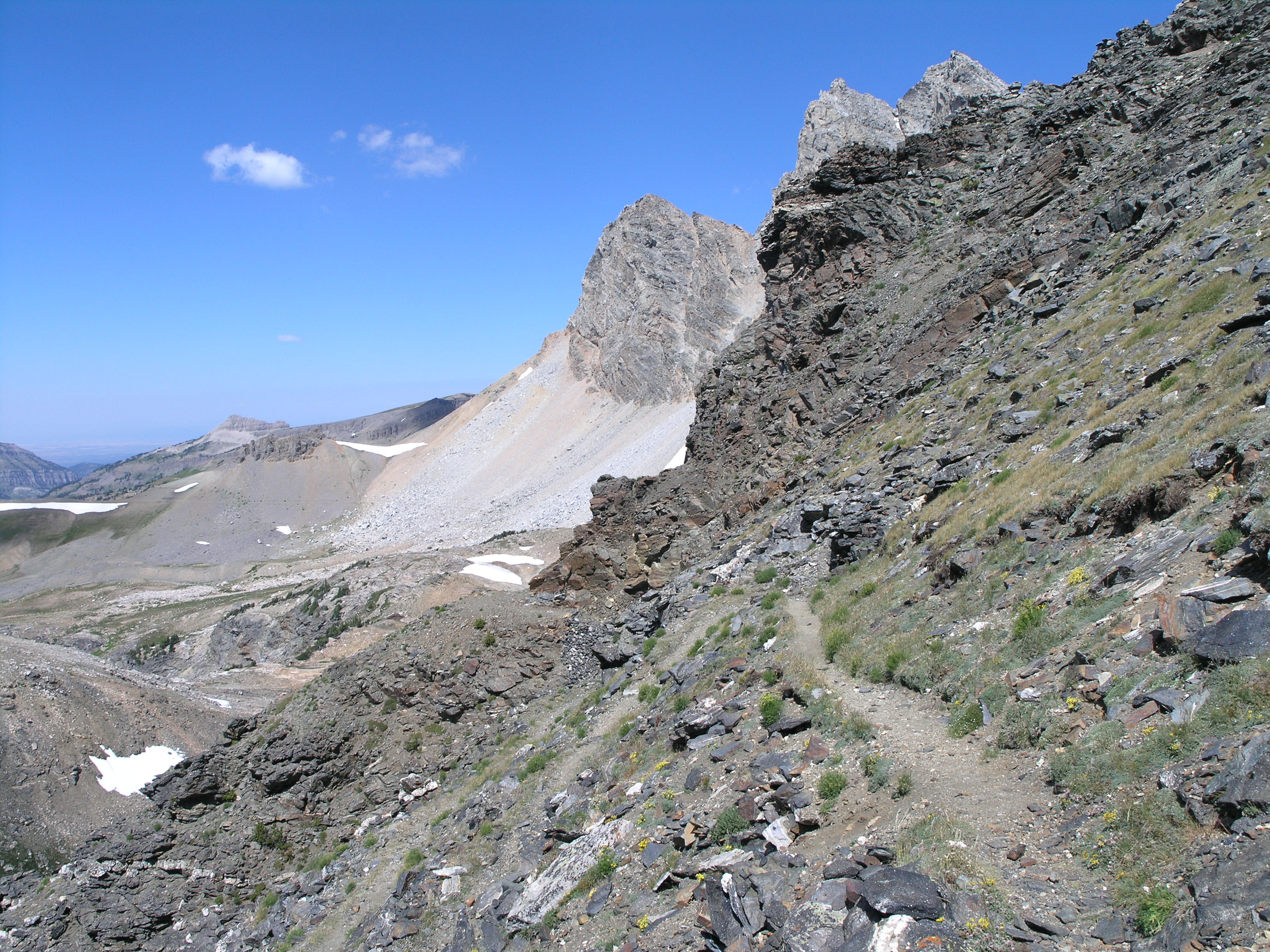
- Alaska Basin Trail with Alaska Basin to the left
- Floor elevation: 9,400 ft (2,900 m)
- Area: 8 mi^{2} (21 km^{2})

Geography
- Country: United States
- State: Wyoming
- Region: Teton Range
- Coordinates: 43°42′04″N 110°51′16″W
- Interactive map of Alaska Basin

Alaska Basin is a subalpine basin on the west slopes of the Teton Range, in the U.S. state of Wyoming. Located on the western border of Grand Teton National Park, Alaska Basin is within the Jedediah Smith Wilderness of Caribou-Targhee National Forest. The drainage for the basin is to the northwest along Teton Creek through Teton Canyon. Access into the basin is by trail only and the basin is bisected by the Teton Crest Trail which connects Mount Meek Pass to the south with Hurricane Pass to the north. The Alaska Basin Trail also enters Alaska Basin and connects with the Teton Crest Trail near Sunset Lake. Alaska Basin can also be accessed from the west by starting at the Teton Canyon campground. From there the hike to the summit of Table Mountain is 12 miles (19 km) roundtrip with a total elevation gain of 4,150 feet (1,260 m).

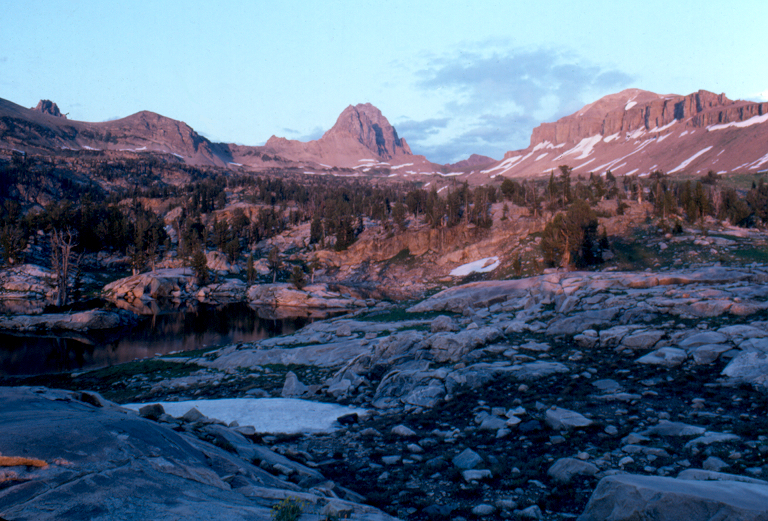
Alaska Basin at sunset
