= Schoolroom Glacier =

Glacier in the United States

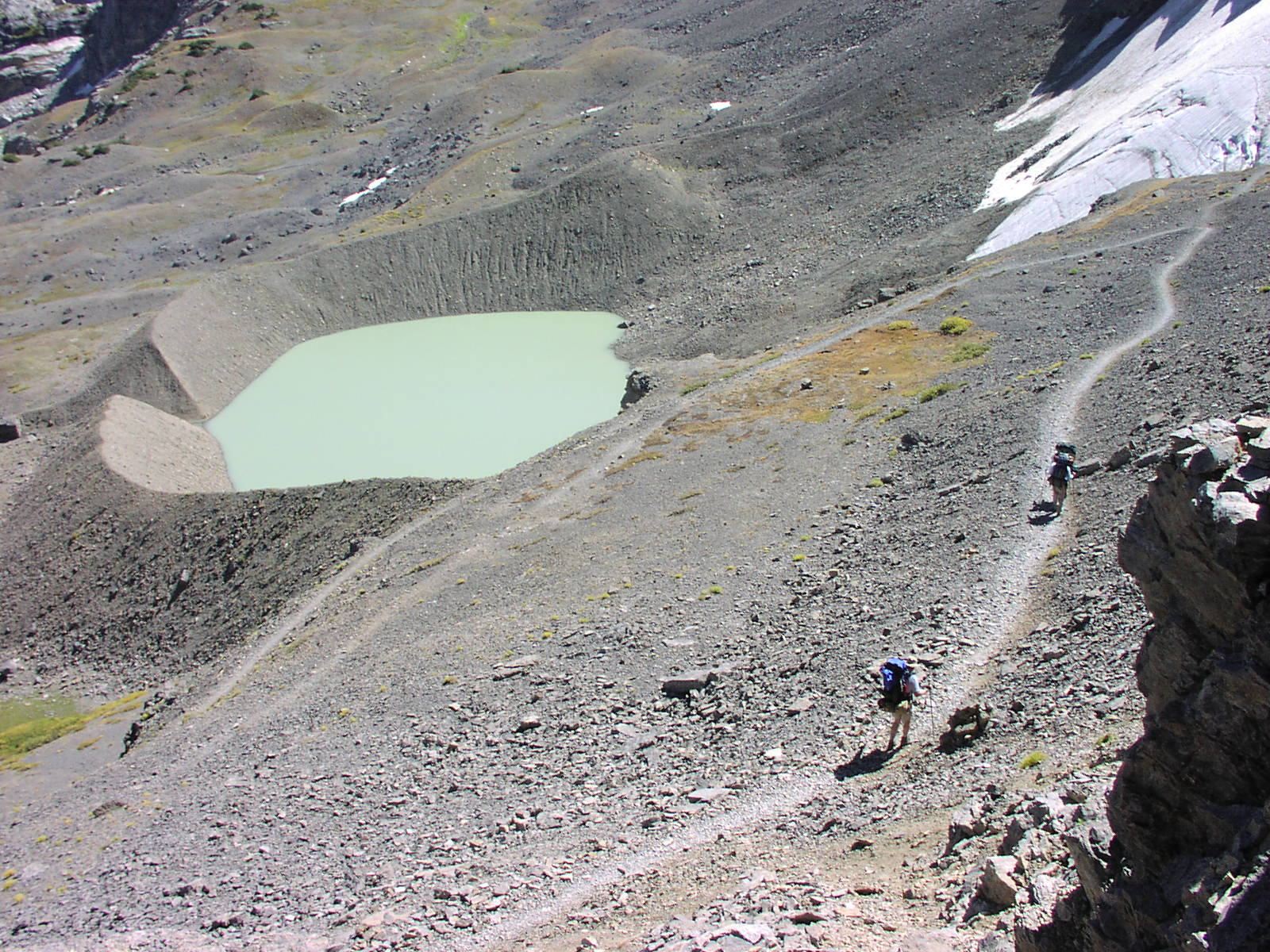
- Schoolroom Glacier at right from Hurricane Pass. Below the glacier is a proglacial lake impounded by lateral and terminal moraines left behind by the retreat of the glacier

- Location within Wyoming
- Type: Mountain/Hanging glacier
- Location: Grand Teton National Park, Teton County, Wyoming, United States
- Coordinates: 43°43′33″N 110°50′56″W
- Area: 2 acres (0.0081 km^{2})
- Length: 325 ft (100 m)
- Terminus: Moraine/Talus slope
- Status: Retreating

Schoolroom Glacier is a small glacier in Grand Teton National Park in the U.S. state of Wyoming. This Teton Range glacier lies adjacent to the south Cascade Canyon trail at an altitude of 10,400 ft (3,200 m), approximately 12 mi (19 km) from the trailhead at Jenny Lake. The glacier has many of the classic textbook details of a glacier, namely, well defined terminal and lateral moraines, crevasses, a proglacial lake (or tarn) and related features which led to the naming schoolroom.

As is true for a vast majority of glaciers worldwide, Schoolroom Glacier has been in a state of retreat for many decades, and if current climatic conditions persist, the glacier is anticipated to disappear by the year 2030, if not sooner.

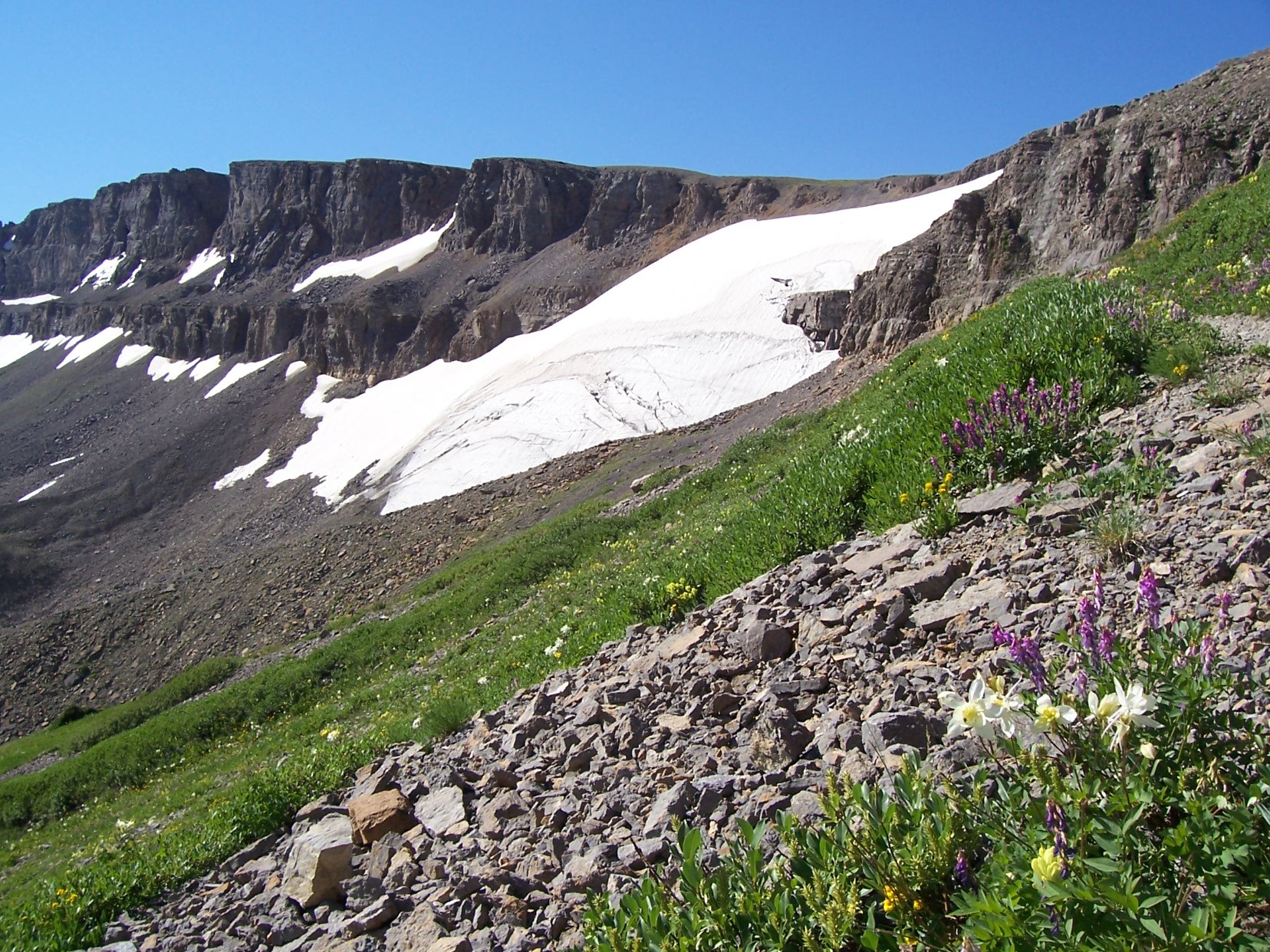
Schoolroom Glacier

== See also ==
- Retreat of glaciers since 1850
- List of glaciers in the United States
