= Teton Crest Trail =

Hiking trail in the state of Wyoming

Coordinates: 43°42′52″N 110°51′18″W

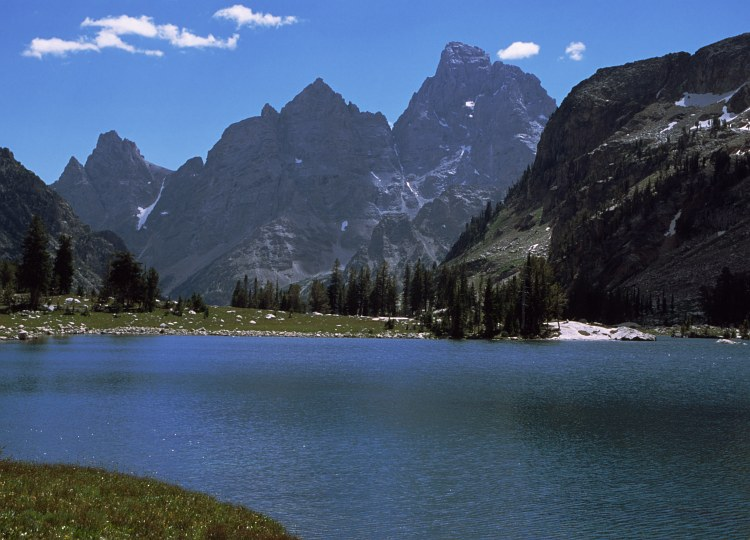
- Lake Solitude and the northwest view of Grand Teton from the Teton Crest Trail
- Length: 40 mi (64 km)
- Location: Teton Range
- Trailheads: Phillips Pass, Wyoming; String Lake, Grand Teton National Park, Wyoming
- Use: Hiking
- Elevation change: 3,775 ft (1,151 m)
- Highest point: Paintbrush Divide, 10,645 ft (3,245 m)
- Lowest point: String Lake, 6,870 ft (2,090 m)
- Difficulty: Strenuous
- Season: Summer to Fall
- Sights: Teton Range
- Hazards: Severe weather Grizzly bears

The Teton Crest Trail is a 40-mile (64 km) long hiking trail in the U.S. state of Wyoming that extends from Phillips Pass, on the border of Bridger Teton and Caribou-Targhee National Forests, to String Lake in Grand Teton National Park. Backpacker Magazine calls the Trail one of the "Best Hikes Ever," with "mesmerizing and constant views of jagged peaks."

Beginning in the south, the Teton Crest Trail can be accessed in several ways. From inside the National Park, the Granite Canyon Trail provides a gradual ascent into the Range, where it connects with the TCT. The Trail is most easily accessed by riding the Jackson Hole Aerial Tram, which transports sightseers and hikers from the Teton Village Resort to the top of Rendezvous Mountain. From outside the Park, the Teton Crest Trail can be accessed via the Phillips Pass Trail, one of several routes through adjacent National Forest lands.

Continuing from the south, it is a 32-mile (51 km) trek to String Lake, passing in and out of Caribou-Targhee National Forest twice, traversing the Death Canyon Shelf and several high passes including Mount Meek Pass, Hurricane Pass and Paintbrush Divide. It is a challenge with 9,681 feet total ascent and 10,779 feet total descent. The trail also traverses the high alpine meadows of Alaska Basin in the Caribou-Targhee National Forest. From Hurricane Pass, the trail provides easy access to Schoolroom Glacier, and parallels the west side of major peaks of the Cathedral Group as it follows the North and South forks of the Cascade Creek.

== Gallery ==
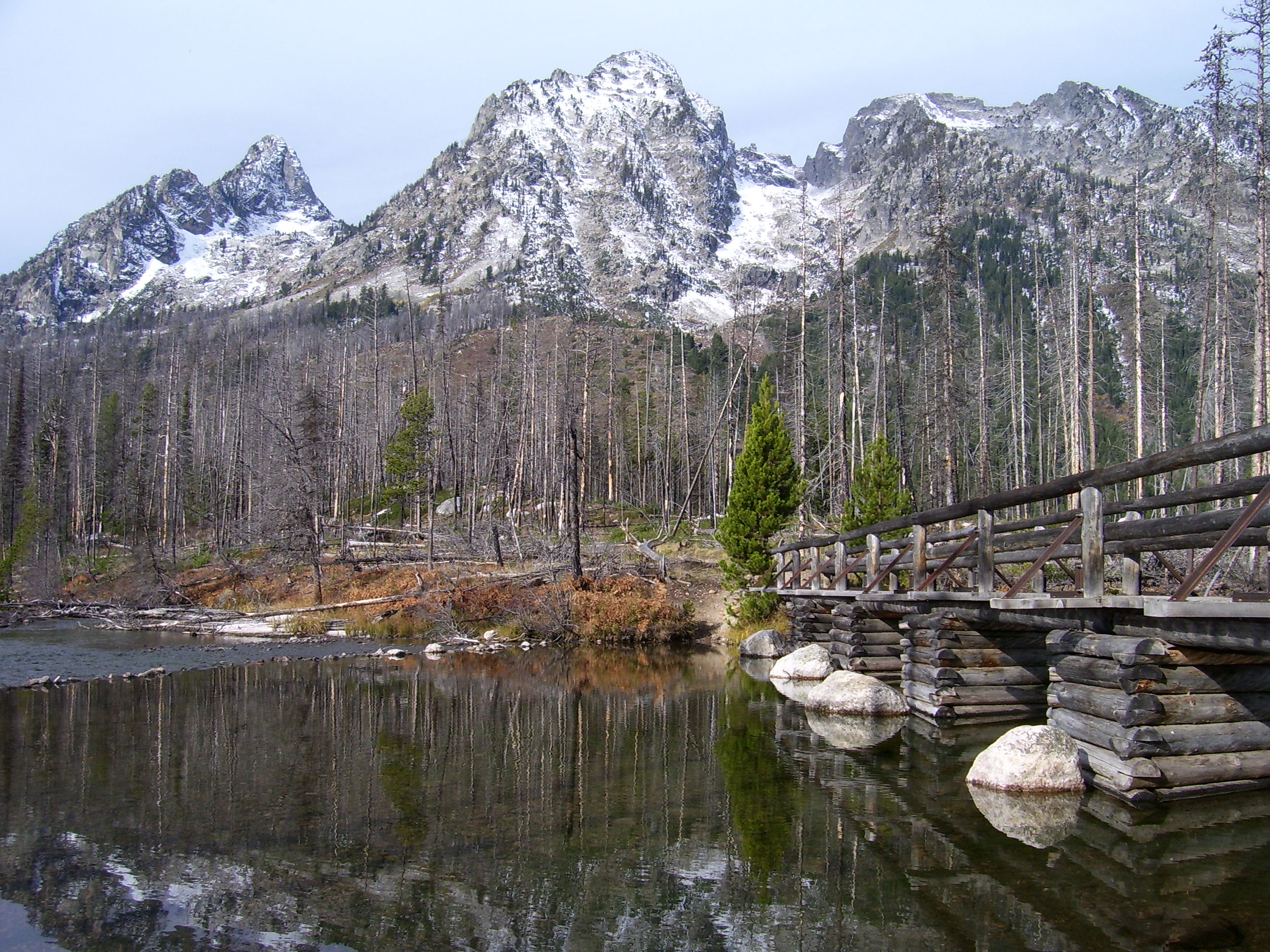
Footbridge across String Lake

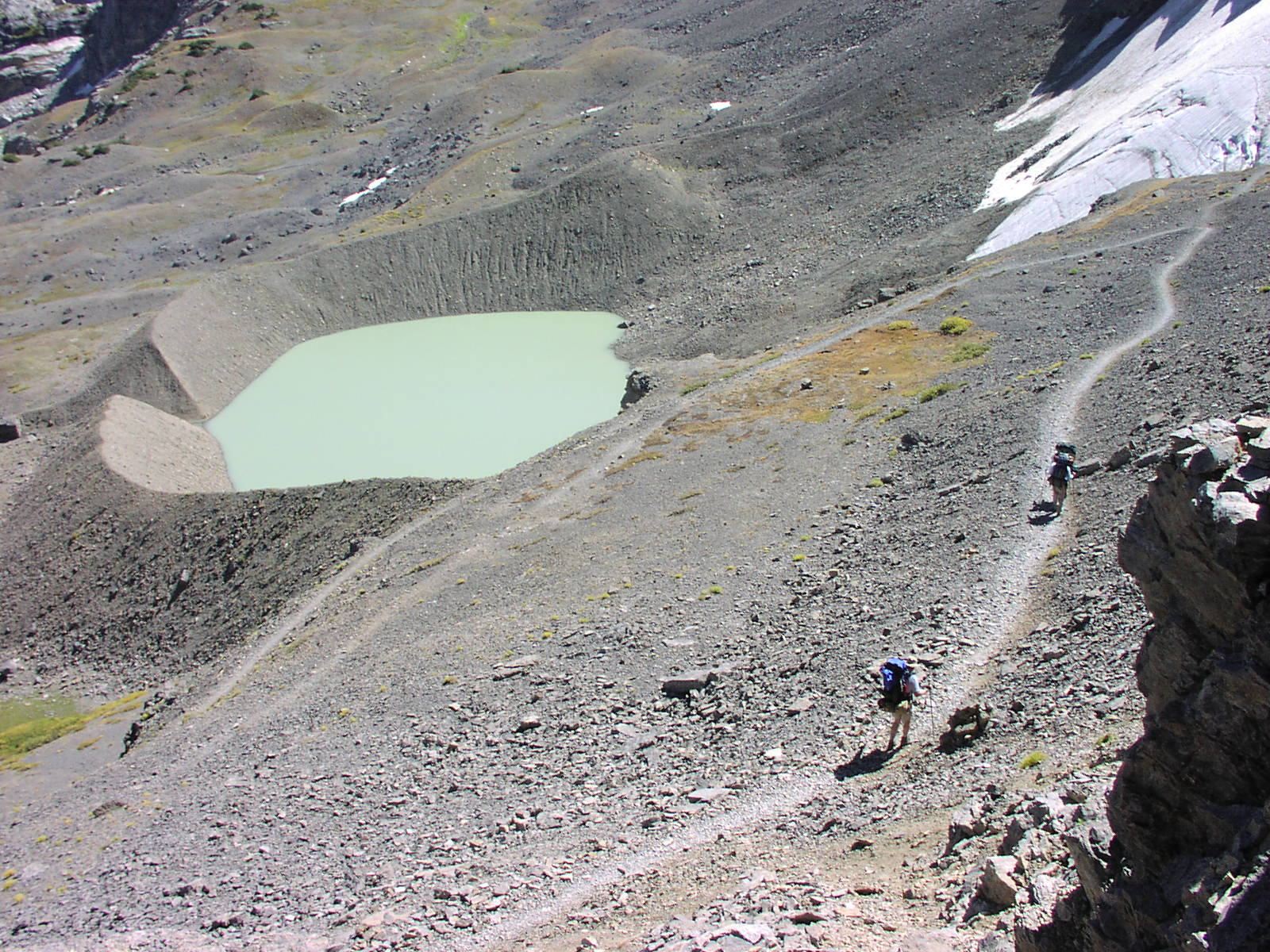
Schoolroom Glacier from Hurricane Pass

== See also ==
- List of hiking trails in Grand Teton National Park
- Backpacking
- Trip report with many pictures and maps of the Teton Crest Trail
