= Death Canyon =

Canyon located in Grand Teton National Park

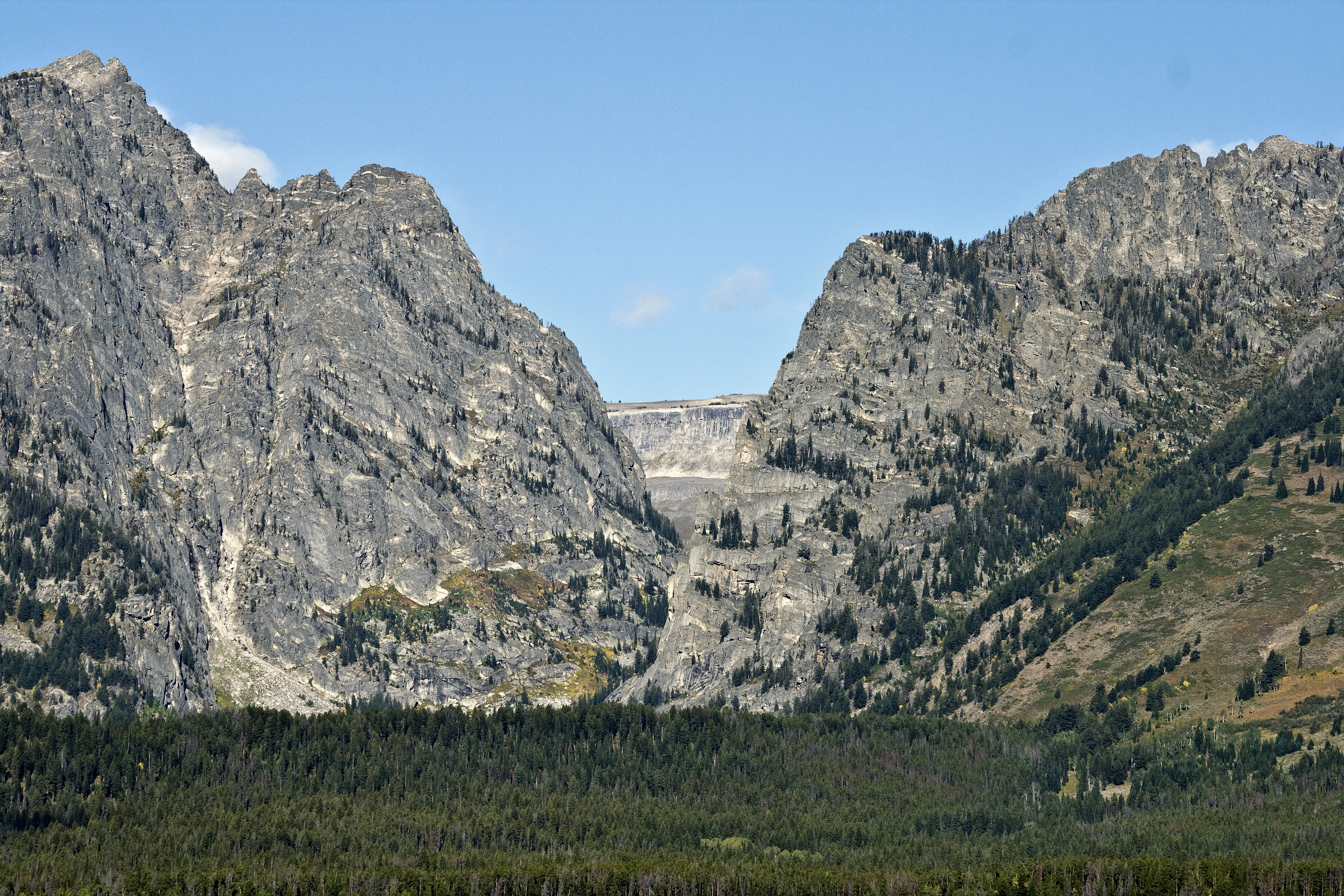
- Death Canyon from Jackson Hole

Geography
- Country: United States
- State: Wyoming
- County: Teton
- Coordinates: 43°39′06″N 110°48′18″W
- Lake: Phelps Lake
- Interactive map of Death Canyon

Death Canyon is located in Grand Teton National Park, in the U.S. state of Wyoming. The canyon was formed by glaciers which retreated at the end of the Last Glacial Maximum approximately 15,000 years ago, leaving behind a U-shaped valley. The trailhead for the canyon is located on a side road off the Moose-Wilson Road, approximately 5 miles (8.0 km) from the park headquarters at Moose, Wyoming. At the base of the canyon is Phelps Lake which was created by glacial activity. The Death Canyon Trail extends the length of the canyon to Fox Creek Pass, at which point the Death Canyon Shelf, a relative narrow and level plateau, can be traversed. The canyon has many Whitebark Pine stands, particularly near the tree line. At the junction of the Death Canyon and the Alaska Basin trails, the historic Death Canyon Barn is preserved after being listed on the National Register of Historic Places in 1998.

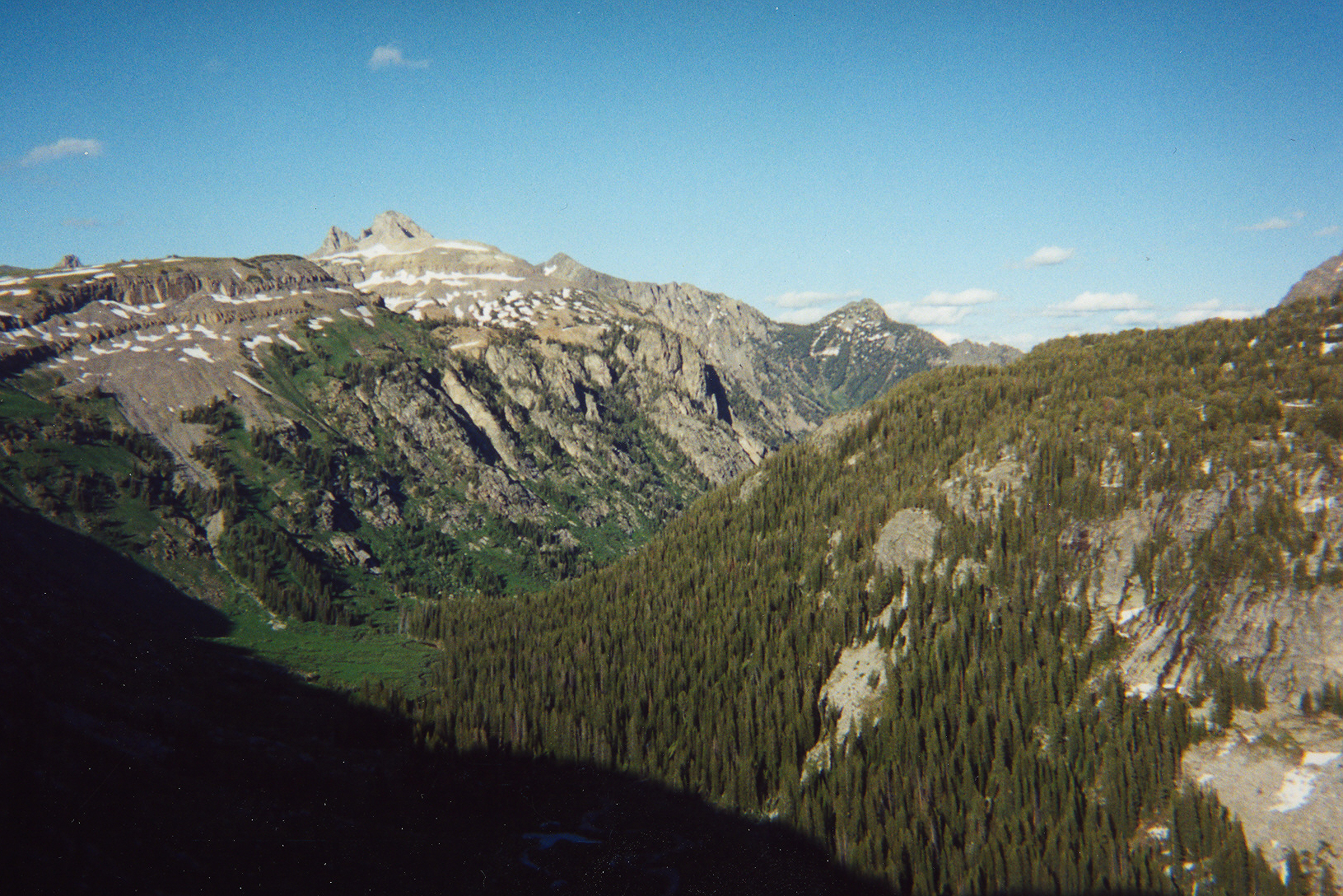
Death Canyon from the Death Canyon Shelf

== See also ==
- Canyons of the Teton Range
- Geology of the Grand Teton area
