= Geology of the Grand Teton area =

The geology of the Grand Teton area consists of some of the oldest rocks and one of the youngest mountain ranges in North America. The Teton Range, partly located in Grand Teton National Park, started to grow some 9 million years ago. An older feature, Jackson Hole, is a basin that sits aside the range.

The 2.5 billion year old metamorphic rocks that make up the east face of the Tetons are marine in origin and include some volcanic deposits. These same rocks are today buried deep inside Jackson Hole. Paleozoic rocks were deposited in warm shallow seas while Mesozoic deposition transitioned back and forth from marine to non-marine sediments with the Cretaceous Seaway periodically covering the area late in that era.

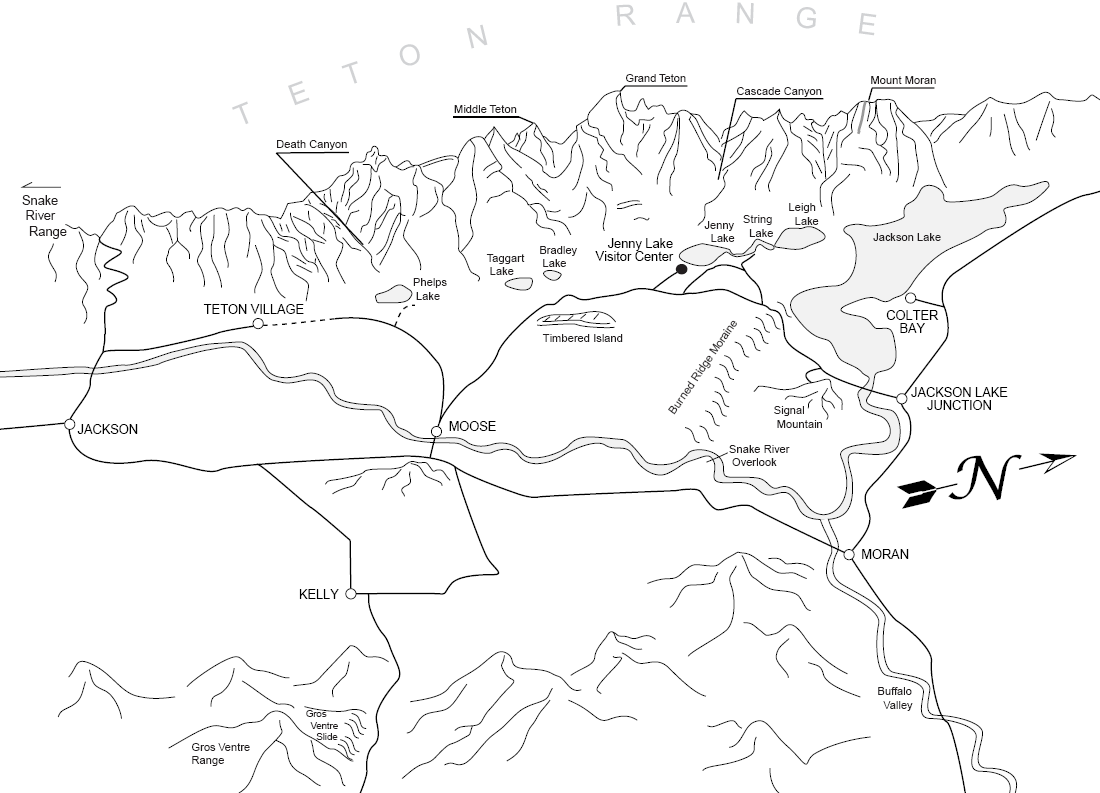
A panoramic perspective map of the Teton area

== Precambrian deposition, metamorphism, and intrusion ==
Perhaps 3 billion years ago in Precambrian time, sand, limey ooze, silt and clay were deposited in a marine trough (accurate dating is not possible, due to subsequent partial recrystallization of the resulting rock). Between these layers were volcanic deposits, probably from an island arc. These sediments were later lithified into sandstones, limestones, and various shales. These rocks were 5 to 10 miles (8.0 to 16.1 km) below the surface when orogenies (mountain-building episodes) around 2.8 to 2.7 billion years ago intensely folded and metamorphosed them, creating alternating light and dark banded gneiss and schist. Today these rocks dominate the east side of the Teton Range with good examples easily viewable in Death Canyon and other canyons. The green to black serpentine created was used by Native Americans to make bowls.

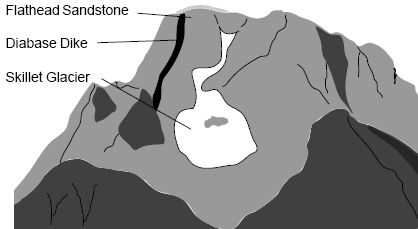
The prominent black diabase dike on Mount Moran is representative of similar dikes formed about 1.3 billion years ago.

Sometime around 2.5 billion years ago, blobs of magma intruded into the older rock, forming plutons of granitic rock. Extensive exposures of this rock are found in the central part of the range. About 1.3 to 1.4 billion years ago in Late Precambrian, 5-to-200-foot (1.5 to 61.0 m) thick black diabase dikes intruded as well, forming the prominent vertical dikes seen today on the faces of Mount Moran and Middle Teton (the dike on Mount Moran is 150 feet (46 m)). Some of the large dikes can be seen from the Jenny Lake and String Lake areas.

More than 700 million years elapsed between intrusion of the black dikes and deposition of the first Paleozoic sedimentary rocks. The Precambrian rocks were uplifted during this gap in the geologic record known as an unconformity; exposed to erosion they were gradually worn to a nearly featureless plain, perhaps resembling the vast flat areas in which similar Precambrian rocks are now exposed in central and eastern Canada. At the close of Precambrian time, about 600 million years ago, the plain slowly subsided and the site of the future Teton Range disappeared beneath shallow seas that were to wash across it intermittently for the next 500 million years.

== Paleozoic deposition ==
Deposition resumed in the Cambrian period and continued through the Paleozoic era, creating nine major formations which together are 4,000 feet (1,200 m) thick (the only geologic period in the Paleozoic not represented is the Silurian). These formations were deposited in a shallow sea and later became a discontinuous mix of dolomites, limestones, sandstones, and shales. These formations are relatively undeformed for their age even though periodic upwarp exposed them to erosion, creating uncomformities. Fossilized brachiopods, bryozoans, corals, and trilobites are found in the carbonate rocks with the best examples found outside of the park in the Alaska Basin. The most complete examples of these formations are found to the west, north, and south of park borders.

=== On the edge of a shallow seaway ===
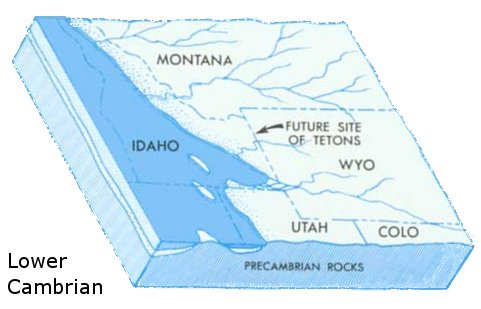
In the Lower (early) Cambrian, the Teton region was on the edge of a shallow seaway called the Cordilleran trough.

Early in Cambrian time a shallow seaway, called the Cordilleran trough, extended from southern California northeastward across Nevada into Utah and Idaho. The vast gently rolling plain on Precambrian rocks to the east was drained by sluggish westward-flowing rivers that carried sand and mud into the sea. The site of the Teton Range was part of this plain. Slow subsidence of the land caused the sea to spread gradually eastward during Middle Cambrian time flooding the Precambrian plain. Sand accumulated along the beaches just as it does today. As the sea moved still farther east, mud was deposited on the now-submerged beach sand. In the Teton area, the oldest sand deposit is the 175 to 200 feet (53 to 61 m) thick Flathead Sandstone. The partly marine Flathead Sandstone is reddish-brown, very hard, brittle and exposures can be found on the north and west flanks of the Teton Range and Gros Ventre Range.

Mud was laid down on top of the Flathead Sandstone as the shoreline advanced eastward across the Teton area. The resulting soft greenish-gray shale with beds of purple and green sandstone near its base, became the 100 feet (30 m) thick Wolsey Shale Member of the Gros Ventre Formation. Some shale shows patterns of cracks that formed when the accumulating mud was briefly exposed to the air along tidal flats. Small phosphatic-shelled animals called brachiopods inhabited these tidal flats but as far as is known, nothing lived on land. Many shale beds are marked with faint trails and borings of worm-like creatures, and a few contain the remains of tiny trilobites.

=== Covered by a shallow sea ===
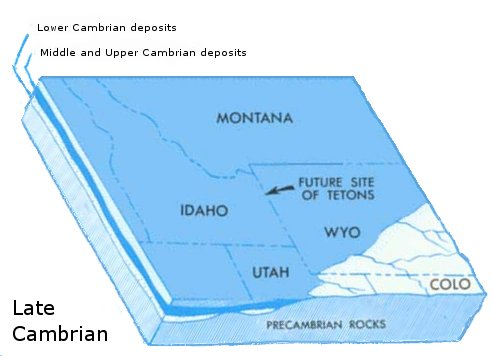
The region was covered by the shallow seaway by the end of the Late Cambrian.

As the shoreline continued to move eastward, the 285-foot-thick (87 m) Death Canyon Limestone Member of the Gros Ventre Formation was laid down in clear water farther from shore. It consists of two thick beds of dark blue-gray limestone that are separated by 15 to 20 feet (4.6 to 6.1 m) of shale. The Death Canyon contains abundant fossil of brachiopods and trilobites in some places. Following this the sea retreated to the west for a short time. The 220-foot-thick (67 m) Park Shale Member of the Gros Ventre Formation was deposited in the shallow muddy water resulting from this retreat. It is a gray-green shale that contains beds of platy limestone conglomerate along with fossils of trilobites and brachiopods. Underwater expanses of algae flourished in places on the sea bottom and built extensive reefs. Periodically shoal areas were hit by violent storm waves that tore loose platy fragments of recently solidified limestone and swept them into nearby channels where they were buried and cemented into thin beds of jumbled fragments called 'edgewise' conglomerate. These are widespread in the shale and in overlying and underlying limestone layers.

By Late Cambrian, the shoreline had once again crept eastward, resulting in clearer water that was probably 100 to 200 feet (30 to 61 m) deep. The 100-foot-thick (30 m) Gallatin Limestone was formed. It consists of blue-gray limestone that is mottled with irregular rusty or yellow patches. Interrupting the limestone are a few beds of 'edgewise' conglomerate that are indicative of sporadic storms. Now at its maximum extent, the sea covered all of Idaho, Montana, most of Wyoming and extended eastward across the Dakotas to connect with shallow seas that covered the eastern United States. Soon after, a slow uplift caused the sea to gradually retreat westward. The site of the Teton Range emerged above sea level, where, as far as is known, it may have been exposed to erosion for nearly 70 million years.

=== Uplift puts the area back on the sea's edge ===
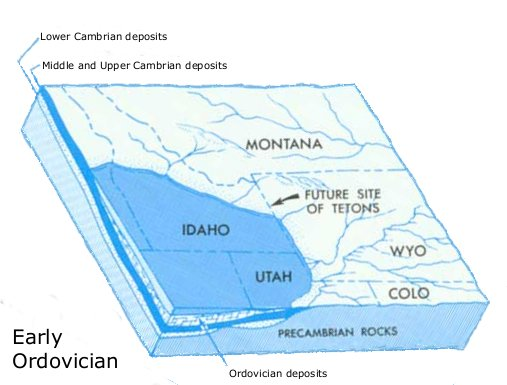
Regional uplift had brought the Teton area above sea level by the early Ordovician.

The Ordovician Bighorn Dolomite forms ragged hard massive light-gray to white cliffs 100 to 200 feet (61 m) high. Dolomite is calcium-magnesium carbonate, but the original sediment probably was calcium carbonate mud that was altered by magnesium-rich sea water shortly after deposition. Corals and other marine animals were abundant in the clear warm seas at this time.

Dolomite in the Devonian Darby Formation differs greatly from the Bighorn Dolomite; in the Darby is dark-brown to almost black, has an oily smell, and contains layers of black, pink, and yellow mudstone and thin sandstone. The sea bottom during deposition of these rocks was foul and frequently the water was turbid. Abundant fossil fragments indicate fishes were common for the first time. Exposures of the Darby Formation are recognizable by their distinctive dull-yellow thin-layered slopes between the prominent gray massive cliffs of formations below and above.

The Mississippian Madison Limestone is 1,000 feet (300 m) thick and is exposed in spectacular vertical cliffs along canyons in the north, west, and south parts of the Tetons. It is noted for the abundant remains of beautifully preserved marine organisms. The fossils and the relatively pure blue-gray limestone in which they are embedded indicate deposition in warm tranquil seas. The Fossil Mountain Ice Cave—Wind Cave system on the west side of the Teton range was dissolved out of this rock by water.

The Pennsylvanian system is represented by the Amsden Formation and the Tensleep Sandstone. Cliffs of the Tensleep Sandstone can be seen along the Gros Ventre River at the east edge of the park. The Amsden, below the Tensleep, consists of red and green shale, sandstone, and thin limestone. The shale is especially weak and slippery when exposed to weathering and saturated with water. These are the strata that make up the glide plane of the Lower Gros Ventre Slide east of the park.

The Phosphoria Formation and its equivalents of Permian age are unlike any other Paleozoic rocks because of their extraordinary content of uncommon elements. The formation consists of sandy dolomite, widespread black phosphate beds and black shale that is unusually rich not only in phosphorus, but also in vanadium, uranium, chromium, zinc, selenium, molybdenum, cobalt, and silver. The formation is mined extensively in nearby parts of Idaho and in Wyoming for phosphatic fertilizer, for the chemical element phosphorus, and for some of the metals that can be derived from the rocks as by-products. These elements and compounds are not everywhere concentrated enough to be of economic interest, but their dollar-value is, in a regional sense, comparable to that of some of the world's greatest mineral deposits.

== Mesozoic deposition ==
Western Interior Seaway 95 million years ago.

Mesozoic deposition changed from primarily marine to a mix of marine, transitional, and continental that varied over time as crustal conditions altered the region. By the close of this era, 10,000 to 15,000 feet (3,000 to 4,600 m) of sediment accumulated in 15 recognized formations. The most extensive non-marine formations were deposited in the Cretaceous period when the eastern part of the Cretaceous Seaway (a warm shallow sea that periodically divided North America in that period) covered the region. Their sediment came from rock eroded from a mountain chain east of the seaway interspersed with ash from volcanos west of the seaway in the Sierran Arc (a long volcanic island chain like the modern Andes Mountains but in island form). This ash eventually became bentonite, a clay which expands in water and thus causes landslides in the park.

Regional uplift in latest Cretaceous time caused the seaway to retreat and transformed the Grand Teton area into a low-lying coastal plain that was frequented by dinosaurs (a fossilized Triceratops was found east of the park near Togwotee Pass). Coalbeds were eventually created from the swamps and bogs left behind after the last stand of the seaway retreated. Coal outcrops can be found near abandoned mines in and outside of the eastern margin of the park. Outcrops of older Mesozoic-aged formations can be found north, east, and south of the park.

=== Sundance Sea covers older deposits ===
Most of the basal part of the Mesozoic sequence consists of the more than 1,000 feet (300 m) thick, soft, bright-red, and Triassic-aged rocks known as the Chugwater Formation. The distribution of Mud cracks, fossilized reptiles and amphibians suggest deposition in a tidal flat environment with a sea several kilometers southwest of Jackson Hole. Evaporite deposits of a few beds of white gypsum (calcium sulfate) were likely formed after shallow bodies of salt water were cut off from the sea. A small amount of iron oxide creates the red color and the formation erodes into colorful hills east and south of the park.

As the Triassic gave way to the Jurassic, wind spread salmon-red colored sand across the red beds of the Chugwater Formation to form the Nugget Sandstone. The Nugget in turn was buried by the deposits of thin red shale and thick gypsum of the Gypsum Springs Formation. Later, a warm, muddy, shallow sea with abundant marine mollusks called the Sundance Sea started to spread from Alaska south to Wyoming. More than 500 feet (150 m) of soft gray fossil-rich shale and thin beds of limestone and sandstones were deposited. After the sea withdrew, the Jurassic and Lower Cretaceous-aged Morrison and Cloverly Formations were laid down on low-lying tropically humid flood plains. These formations erode into colorful badlands of red, pink, purple, and green claystones and mudstones, and yellow to buff sandstones. Large and small dinosaurs roamed the abundant vegetation and swamps.

=== Western Interior Seaway expands and retracts ===
Brightly colored rocks continued to be deposited as the final period of the Mesozoic, the Cretaceous dawned. Another warm, shallow sea, the Western Interior Seaway, then partly and sometimes completely covered the Teton region along with most of Wyoming, About 10,000 feet (3,000 m) of drab-colored sand, silt, and clay with some coal beds, volcanic ash layers, and minor amounts of gravel were deposited.

The Western Interior Seaway retreated eastward from the Teton region around 85 million years ago, marked by deposition of the Bacon Ridge Sandstone. Extensive coal swamps formed along and followed the retreating seashore, leaving coal beds 5 to 10 feet (3.0 m) thick in the Upper Cretaceous strata. Examples of these coal beds are visible in abandoned mines found in the eastern margin of the park. A modern analog of this depositional environment is the hot and humid climate of the Florida Everglades. About 5 feet (1.5 m) of compacted plant material is needed to form 1-inch (25 mm) of coal.

Fine-grained volcanic ash from volcanoes west and northwest of the Teton area was periodically deposited in the quiet shallow water of the Western Interior Seaway throughout Cretaceous time. Ash deposited in this manner was later altered to bentonite; a type of clay used in the foundry industry and as a component of oil well drilling mud. Elk and deer in Jackson Hole use exposures of bentonite as a (bitter) salt lick. Bentonite swells when wet, which causes landslides that sometimes block access roads into Jackson Hole.

Cretaceous-aged rocks in the Teton region form part of a huge east-thinning wedge of crust that is locally almost 2 miles (3.2 km) thick. Most of these rocks are from debris eroded from slowly rising mountains in the west. Bentonite, crude oil and natural gas are commonly produced from the various Cretaceous formations. Enormous coal reserves, with some beds reaching 50 to 100 feet (30 m) thick, are a potentially vast resource.

By the end of the Cretaceous, slightly more than 80 million years ago, the region's landscape was flat and monotonous; a condition that persisted during most of the Late Cretaceous.

=== Rocky Mountains rise ===
The period of uplift that resulted in the formation of the ancestral Rocky Mountains is called the Laramide orogeny. Mountains already existed west and southwest of Wyoming, with progressively older mountains (up to Jurassic age) trending west into Nevada. Latest Cretaceous time saw the formation of a low broad northwest-trending arch along the approximate area of the present Teton Range and Gros Ventre Mountains.

Part of the evidence for the first Laramide mountain building west of the Teton region is the several hundred cubic miles of quartzite boulders derived from the Targhee uplift, which was located north and west of the northern end of the present-day Teton Range. Streams carried boulders, sand, and clay from the uplift eastward and southeastward across what would become Jackson Hole. Flakes of gold and some mercury are in the resulting Harebell Formation. Two huge depositional troughs were formed in central and southern Wyoming from fine-grained debris carried farther east and southeast. Many of the larger boulders were derived from Precambrian and possibly lower Paleozoic quartzites, meaning that at least 15,000 feet (4,600 m) of Paleozoic and Mesozoic rock must have been stripped from the Targhee uplift before the quartzites were exposed to erosion.

== Tertiary uplift and deposition ==
The tectonic setting of western North America changed drastically as the Farallon Plate under the Pacific Ocean to the west was shallowly subducted below North American Plate. Called the Laramide orogeny, the compressive forces generated from this collision erased the Cretaceous Seaway, fused the Sierran Arc to the rest of North America and created the Rocky Mountains. This mountain-building event started in the Mesozoic 80 million years ago and lasted well into the first half of the Cenozoic era 30 million years ago.

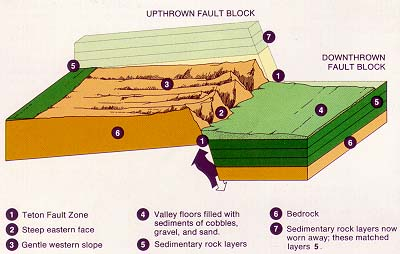
Teton fault block

Some 60 million years ago, these forces uplifted the low-lying coastal plain in the Teton region and created the north–south-trending thrust faults of the nearby Wyoming Overthrust Belt. Uplift intensified and climaxed a few million years later early in the Eocene epoch when large thrust and reverse faults created small mountain ranges separated by subsiding sedimentary basins. One of the reverse faults, the north–south trending 10 miles (16 km) long Buck Mountain Fault, elevated what is today the central part of the Teton Range.

By about 34 million years ago, these forces had uplifted a broad part of western Wyoming into a continuous high plateau. This region includes areas now occupied by the Teton Range, Gros Ventre Range, Wind River Mountains and other mountain ranges to the south and east of the Tetons. A separate area of uplift called the Targhee Uplift formed north of park borders around this time.

Subsequent erosion of the Targhee Uplift was driven by steepened stream gradients. Gravel, quartzite cobbles, and sand from this erosion eventually became the 5,000-foot (1,500 m) thick Harebell Formation seen today as various conglomerates and sandstones in the northern and northeastern parts of the park. In the Paleocene epoch large amounts of clastic sediment derived from uplifted areas covered the Harebell Formation to become the Pinyon Conglomerate. The lower members of this formation consist of coal beds and claystone with conglomerate made of quartzite from the Targhee uplift above.

The subducting Farallon Plate was eventually completely consumed below the North American Plate, bringing an end to the Laramide orogeny. Hot and semi-plastic rock deep below western North America responded to the lack of compression beginning 30 million years ago by slowly rising; gradually pushing the overlying rock sideways both east and west. Blocks of the brittle upper crust responded by breaking along roughly parallel north-to-south trending normal faults that each have a subsiding basin on one side and a mountain range on the other. This stretching may have begun to tear apart the previously mentioned high plateau in western Wyoming around this time, but evidence from ancient sediments indicates that the Teton Fault system developed much later (see below). An eastward-moving intensification of this process began 17 million years ago, creating the Basin and Range geologic province in Nevada and western Utah. Stretching of the crust in this region eventually exceeded 200 miles (320 km), doubling the distance between Reno, Nevada, and Salt Lake City, Utah.

Waning of the Laramide orogeny coincided with volcanic eruptions from two parallel volcanic chains separated by a long valley in the Yellowstone-Absaroka area to the north. Huge volumes of volcanic material such as tuff and ash accumulated to great depth in the Grand Teton area, forming the Absaroka Volcanic Supergroup. Additional eruptions east of Jackson Hole deposited their own debris in the Oligocene and Miocene epochs.

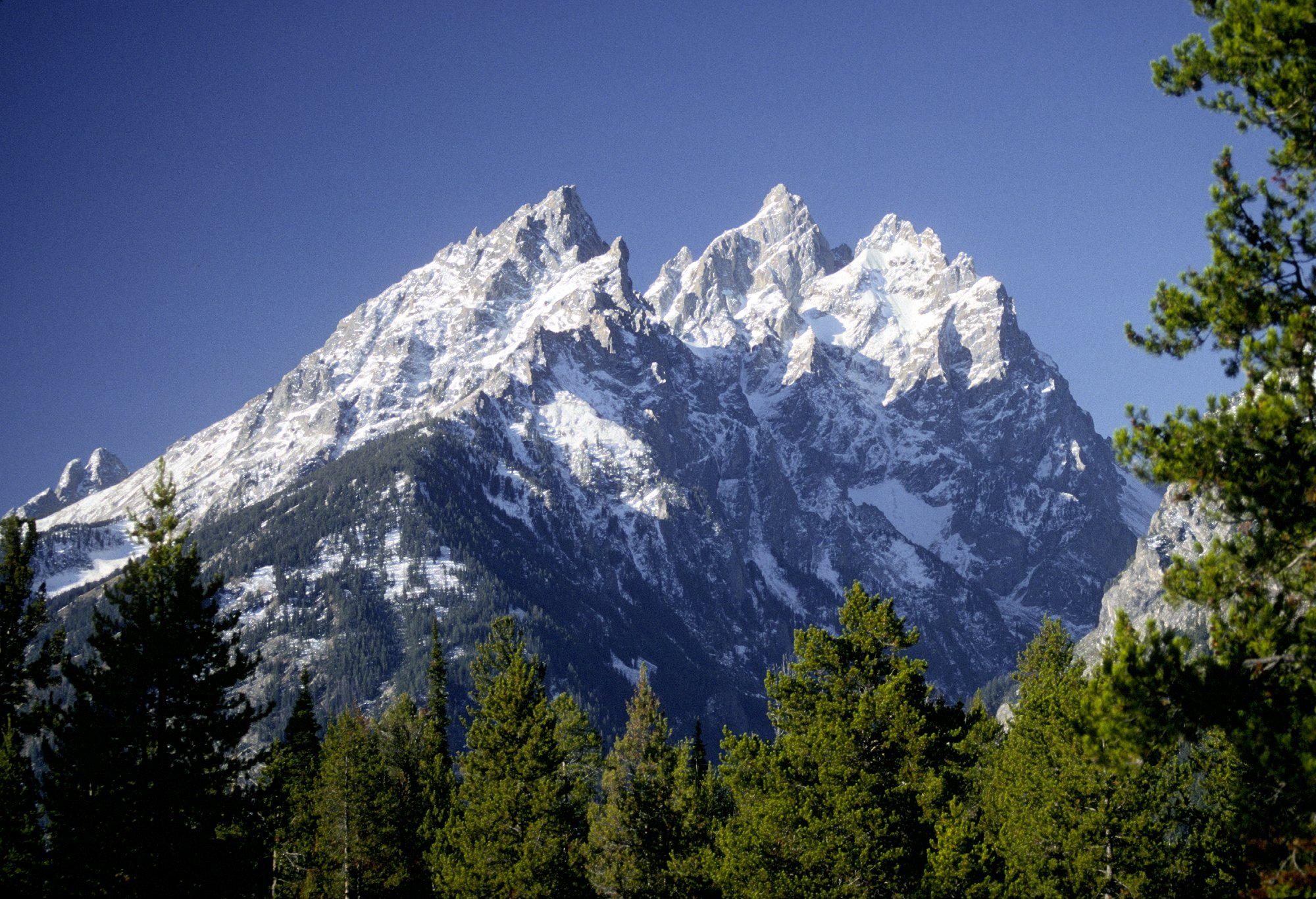
The northern portion of the Cathedral Group of high peaks, with Teewinot Mountain on the left, Grand Teton center and Mount Owen at right.

Sediment collected in various lakes in the area from around 17 to 15 million years ago, becoming the Miocene-aged Colter Formation. Beginning around 13 million years ago (also in the Miocene), a 40-mile (64-km) long steeply east dipping normal fault system called the Teton Fault started to vertically move two adjacent blocks. One block, the Jackson Hole basin, moved down while the other block, containing the westward-tilting eastern part of the Teton Range, moved up; thus creating the youngest mountain range in the Rocky Mountains. Most of the downward movement occurred right next to the fault, resulting in a 15° tilt of the Colter Formation. No sediment was deposited on top of the tilted Colter Formation for up to three million years, resulting in an angular unconformity as the tilted Colter partially eroded away.

Around 10 million years ago, Jackson Hole's first large freshwater lake was impounded by east–west fault movement in what is today the southern end of the park. Geologists call this fault-scarp dammed body of shallow water Lake Teewinot and it persisted for around 5 million years. The resulting Teewinot Formation of lakebed sediments sits directly on the Colter and consists of limestones and claystones mixed with volcanic material and fossilized clams and snails. All told, sediments in the Tertiary period attained an aggregate thickness of around 6 miles (9.7 km), forming the most complete non-marine Tertiary geologic column in the United States. Most of these units within the park are, however, buried under younger deposits.

Eventually all the Mesozoic rock from the Teton Range was stripped away and the same formations in Jackson Hole were deeply buried. A prominent outcrop of the pink-colored Flathead Sandstone exists 6,000 feet (1,800 m) above the valley floor on the summit of Mount Moran. Drilling in Jackson Hole found the same formation 24,000 feet (7,300 m) below the valley's surface, indicating that the two blocks have been displaced 30,000 feet (9,100 m) from each other. Thus an average of one foot of movement occurred every 300 years (1 cm per year on average).

== Quaternary volcanic deposits and ice ages ==
Massive volcanic eruptions from the Yellowstone Volcano northwest of the area occurred 2.2 million, 1.3 million, and 630,000 years ago. Each catastrophic caldera-forming eruption was preceded by a long period of more conventional eruptions along even earlier volcanic episodes. One such event sent large amounts of Rhyolitic lava into the northern extent of Teewinot Lake. The resulting obsidian (volcanic glass) has been potassium-argon dated to 9 million years and was used by Native Americans starting thousands of years ago to make arrowheads, knives, and spear points. The lake was dry by the time a series of enormous pyroclastic flows from the Yellowstone area buried Jackson Hole under welded tuff. Older exposures of this tuff are exposed in the Bivouac Formation at Signal Mountain and Pleistocene-aged tuffs are found capping East and West Gros Venture Buttes (both the mountain and buttes are small fault blocks).

Climatic conditions in the area gradually changed through the Cenozoic as plate tectonics moved North America northwest from a sub-tropical to a temperate zone by the Pliocene epoch. The onset of a series of glaciations in the Pleistocene epoch saw the introduction of large glaciers in the Teton and surrounding ranges, which flowed all the way to Jackson Hole during at least three ice ages. Cascade, Garnet, Death and Granite Canyons were all carved by successive periods of glaciation.

The first and most severe of the known glacial advances in the area was caused by the Buffalo glaciation. In that event the individual alpine (mountain valley) glaciers from the Tetons' east side coalesced to form a 2,000-foot (610 m) thick apron of ice that overrode and abraded Signal Mountain and the other three buttes at the south end of Jackson Hole. Similar dramas were repeated on other ranges in the region, eventually forming part of the Canadian Ice Sheet, which at its maximum, extended into eastern Idaho. This continental-sized glacial system stripped all the soil and vegetation from countless valleys and many basins, leaving them a wasteland of bedrock strewn with boulders after the glaciers finally retreated. Parts of Jackson Hole that were not touched by the following milder glaciations still cannot support anything but the hardiest plants (smaller glaciers deposit glacial till and small rocks relatively near their source, while continental glaciers transport all but the largest fragments far away).

A less severe glaciation, known as Bull Lake, started sometime between 160 and 130 thousand years ago. Bull Lake helped repair some of the damage of the Buffalo event by forming smaller glaciers which deposited loose material over the bedrock. In that event, the large glacier which ran down Jackson Hole only extended just south of where Jackson, Wyoming, now sits and melted about 100,000 years ago.

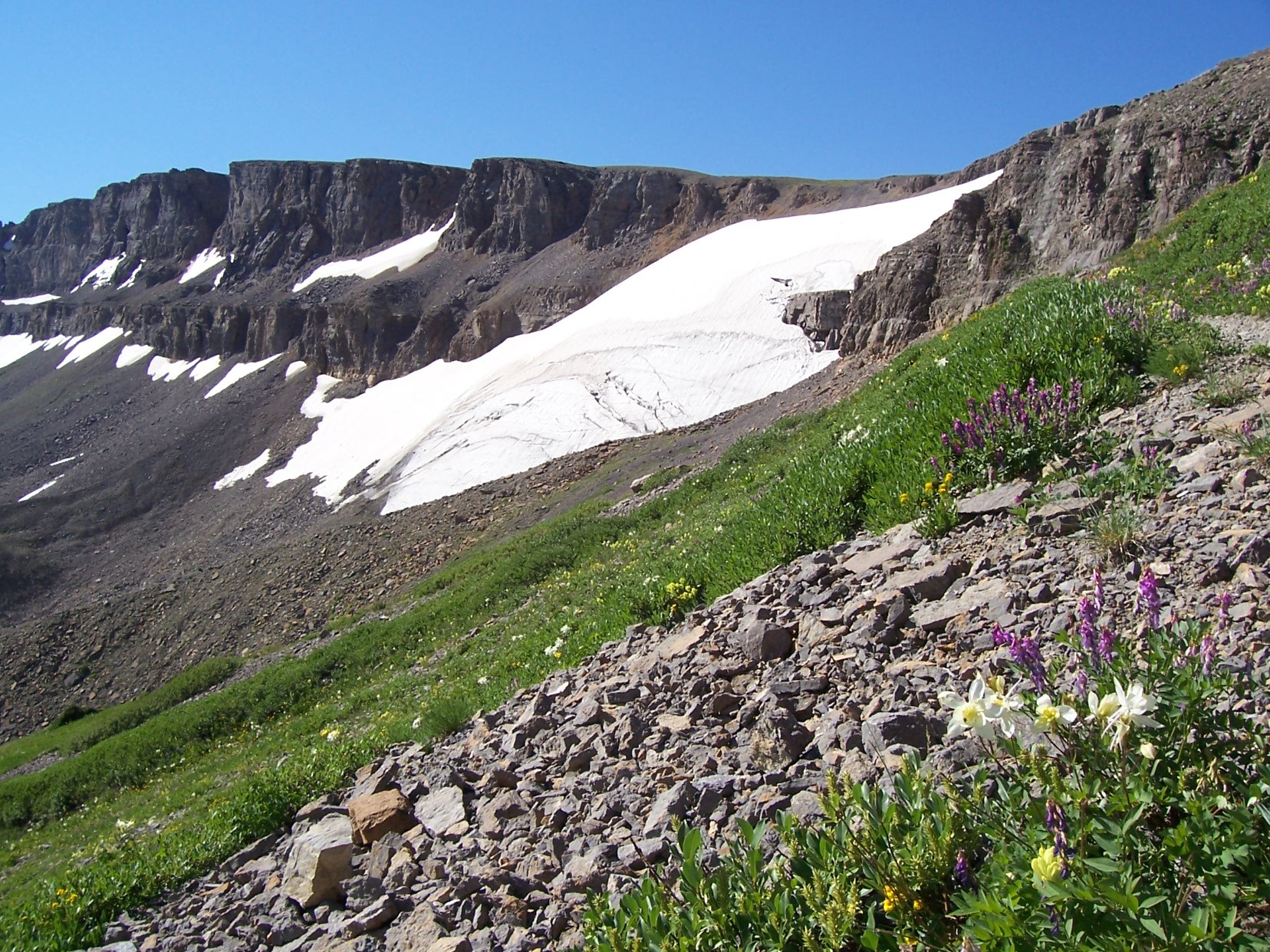
Schoolroom Glacier is a small remnant glacier left behind from the last major glaciation

Then from 25,000 to 10,000 years ago the lower volume Wisconsin glaciation carved many of the glacial features seen today. Burned Ridge is made of the terminal moraine (rubble dump) of the largest of these glaciers to affect the area. Today this hummocky feature is covered with trees and other vegetation. Smaller moraines from a less severe part of the Pinedale were formed just below the base of each large valley in the Teton Range by alpine glaciers. Many of these piles of glacial rubble created depressions that in modern times are filled with a series of small lakes (Leigh, String, Jenny, Bradley, Taggart, and Phelps). Jackson Lake is the largest of these and was impounded by a recessional moraine left by the last major glacier in Jackson Hole. A collection of kettles (depressions left by melted stagnant ice blocks from a retreating glacier) south of the lake is called the Potholes. The basins that hold Two Ocean Lake and Emma Matilda Lake were created during the Bull Lake glaciation. Since then humans have built a dam over Jackson Lake's outlet to increase its size for recreational purposes.

All Pinedale glaciers probably melted away soon after the start of the Holocene epoch. The dozen small cirque glaciers seen today were formed during a subsequent neoglaciation 5000 years ago. Mount Moran has five such glaciers with Triple Glaciers on the north face, Skillet Glacier on the east face, and Falling Ice Glacier on the southeast face. All the glacial action has made the peaks of the Teton Range jagged from frost wedging. Other glaciers include Teton Glacier, below the east face of Grand Teton, Middle Teton Glacier, situated on the northeast slopes of Middle Teton, and the fast retreating Schoolroom Glacier, west of Grand Teton at Hurricane Pass.

Mass wasting events such as the 1925 Gros Ventre landslide continue to change the area. On June 22, 1925, an earthquake with an estimated magnitude of 4 weakened the side of a mountain located three miles (4.8 km) outside of the current park's southeastern border. The next day, 50 million cubic yards (38 million cubic meters) of water-saturated Pennsylvanian-aged Tensleep Sandstone slid 1.5 miles (2.4 km) from its source on Sheep Mountain and into the Gros Ventre River valley 2,100 feet (640 m) below, damming the river. Stressed by snow melt, the resulting 5 miles (8.0 km) long and 200 feet (61 m) deep lake breached the debris dam on May 18, 1927, and flooded the town of Kelly, Wyoming, killing six.
