= Fossil Mountain (Wyoming) =

Mountain in the state of Wyoming

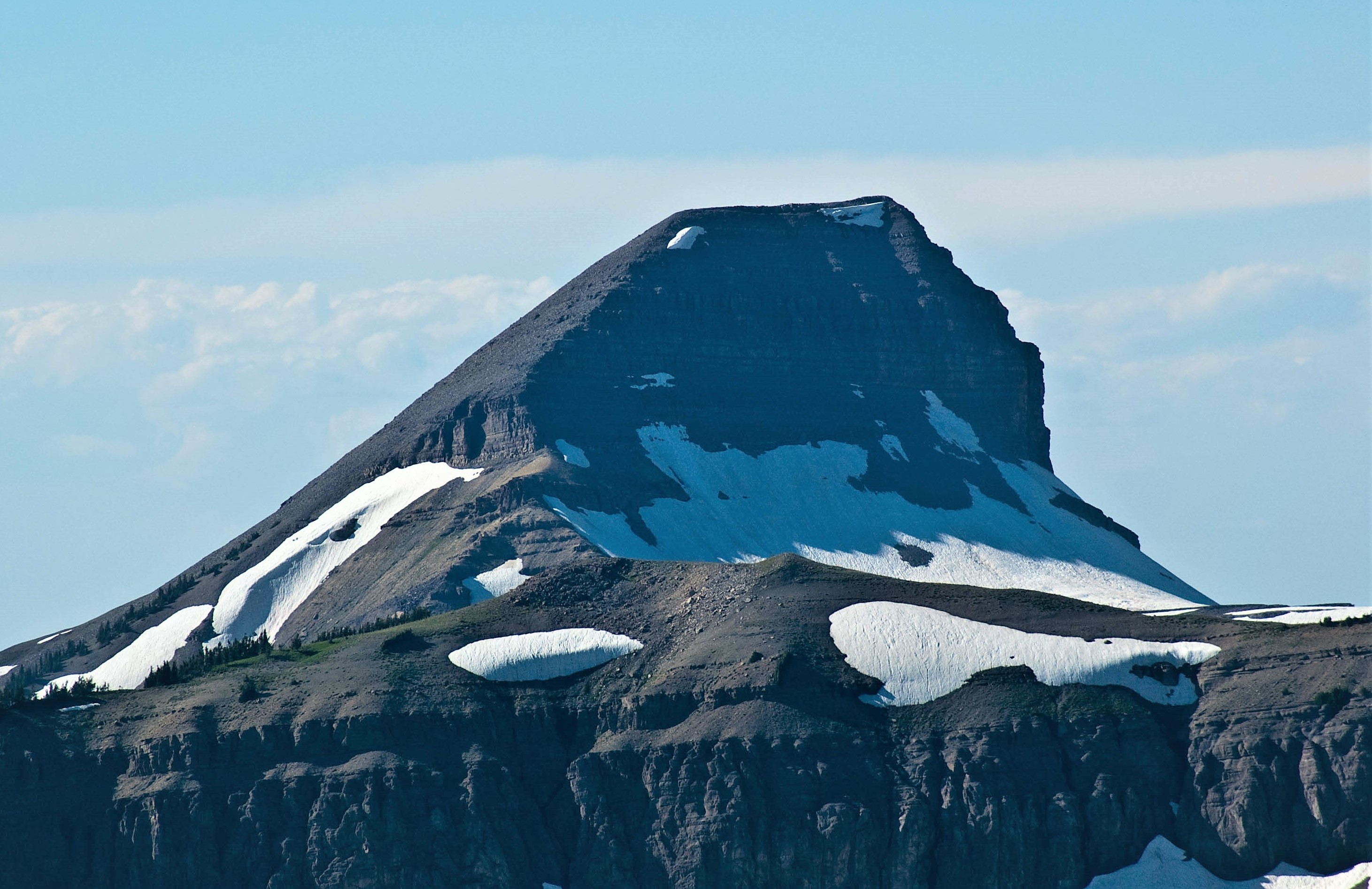
- South aspect

Highest point
- Elevation: 10,921 ft (3,329 m)
- Prominence: 756 ft (230 m)
- Coordinates: 43°39′13″N 110°55′08″W

Geography
- Location within Wyoming
- Location: Caribou-Targhee National Forest, Teton County, Wyoming, U.S.
- Parent range: Teton Range
- Topo map: USGS Mount Bannon

Fossil Mountain (10,921 feet (3,329 m)) is located in the Teton Range, within the Jedediah Smith Wilderness of Caribou-Targhee National Forest, U.S. state of Wyoming.

As mapped by J. D. Love and others, the peak of Fossil Mountain consists of relatively flat-lying beds of the Mississippian Madison Limestone and underlying Devonian Darby Formation. Underlying the Darby Formation and exposed in shear cliffs and floors of glacially modified valleys are the Ordovician Bighorn Dolomite, Cambrian Gallatin Formation, Gros Ventre Formation and Flathead Sandstone. In all, there is about 2,700 feet (820 m) of lower and middle Paleozoic sedimentary strata exposed within the area of Fossil Mountain.

The study of the sedimentary strata within the Teton Range, shows that these strata consist mostly of limestones and dolomites. The Madison Limestone consists of a basal, dark-colored, fine-grained dolomitic limestones overlain by hundreds of feet of gray limestone that is classified as fossiliferous oosparite and fossiliferous pelsparite. Abundant fossils of shells and corals, which are protected by federal laws, have been found in the Madison Limestone at Fossil Mountain. Underlying the Madison Limestone, the Darby Formation consists mostly of dolomites and limestones that commonly contain discontinuous layers of calcareous shale or sandstone.

== Fossil Mountain Ice Cave ==
Fossil Mountain Ice Cave is a notable solutional cave in the Madison Limestone west of Fossil Mountain. This cave is also known as Darby Ice Cave, Darby Canyon Caves, or Wind Cave. It has about 3 mi (4.8 km) of passage. The underground distance between entrances is about 1.5 mi (2.4 km) of travel underground 1 mi (1.6 km) on the surface. It is noted for the presence of layered ice and sediments deposits up to 42 ft (13 m) thick.

Fossil Mountain Ice Cave has a combination of hazards that have resulted in frequent rescues. The safe exploration of this cave requires the participation of cavers with previous experience with this cave; expertise in ice and rock caving; specialized and appropriate caving equipment; and detailed planning and preparation, including the prepositioning of ropes, for a visit to this cave. Also, visiting this cave has detrimental effects on the preservation of scientifically significant ice deposits found within this cave. For example, visitor-induced melting of ice deposits was noted as early as 1975.

The analysis of measurements of stable isotopes of oxygen and hydrogen recovered form samples of ice collected from Fossil Mountain Ice Cave provided a record of paleotemperatures of this part of the Teton Range for the past 175 years. They showed a continuing increase in local temperatures over the past the past 160 years. In addition, two consecutive very cold years in the early 1870s were found.

== See also ==
- Geology of the Grand Teton area
