= Thor Peak (Wyoming) =

Mountain in Wyoming, United States

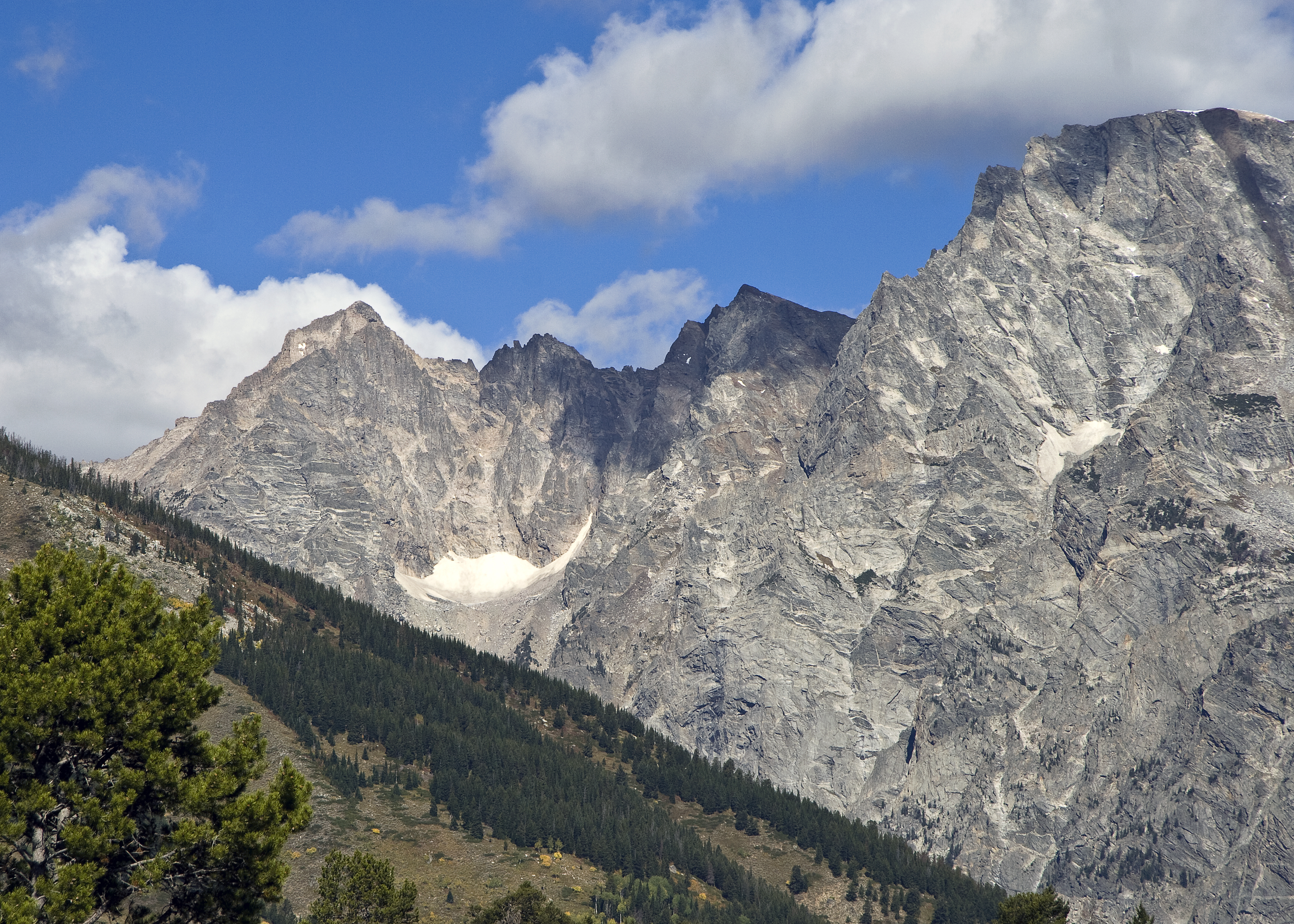
- Thor Peak at left and Mount Moran at right

Highest point
- Elevation: 12,033 ft (3,668 m)
- Prominence: 348 ft (106 m)
- Coordinates: 43°49′51″N 110°47′42″W

Geography
- Location within Wyoming Location within the United States
- Location: Grand Teton National Park, Teton County, Wyoming, U.S.
- Parent range: Teton Range
- Topo map: USGS Mount Moran

Climbing
- First ascent: August 1930, Paul Petzoldt and Bruton Strange

Thor Peak (12,033 feet (3,668 m)) is in the northern Teton Range, Grand Teton National Park, in the U.S. state of Wyoming. Mount Moran is 1 mile (1.6 km) to the east. The summit is the eighth-highest in the Teton Range. Several semi-permanent snowfields as well as the Triple Glaciers are located on the east and northern slopes of the mountain. While the easiest route up the mountain, the south slope, is only rated a class 4, the mountain's remoteness and difficulty of approach make it a challenging mountain to summit.
