= Triple Glaciers =

Glaciers in Wyoming, United States

- Location within Wyoming
- Type: Mountain glacier
- Location: Grand Teton National Park, Teton County, Wyoming, USA
- Coordinates: 43°50′19″N 110°47′05″W
- Length: .25 mi (0.40 km)
- Terminus: moraine
- Status: unknown

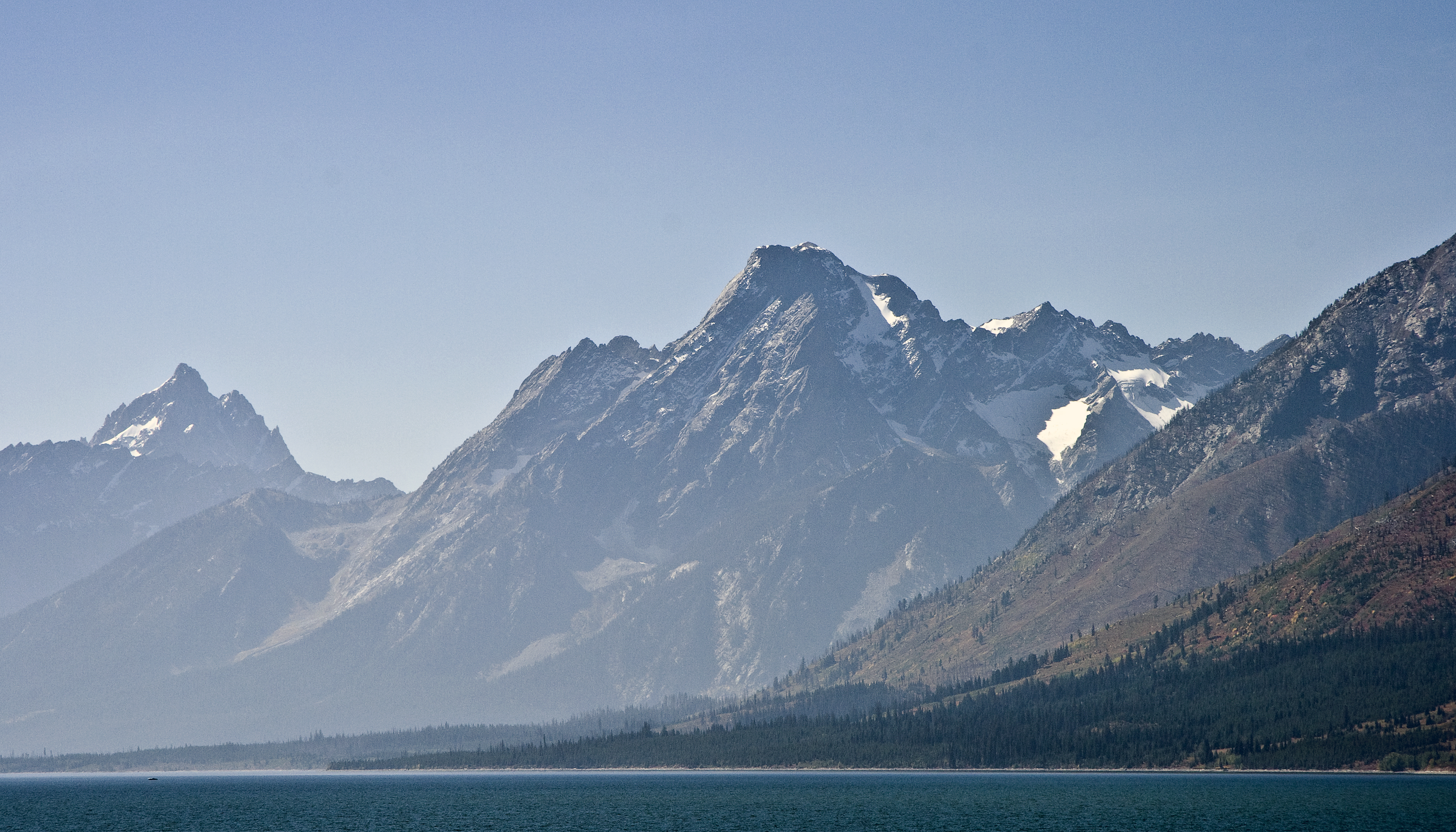
Mount Moran (center) with Grand Teton on left behind Mt. St. John, seen over Jackson Lake from the north, Grand Teton National Park, Wyoming, USA

Triple Glaciers are in Grand Teton National Park, Wyoming, United States. The glaciers are disconnected from each other and occupy three separate cirques on the northwest face of Mount Moran and northeast of Thor Peak. The glaciers are unofficially referred to as East, Middle and West Triple Glacier.

== See also ==
- List of glaciers in the United States
- Geology of the Grand Teton area
