= Wolsey Shale =

Geologic formation in Montana

- Stratigraphic range: Cambrian
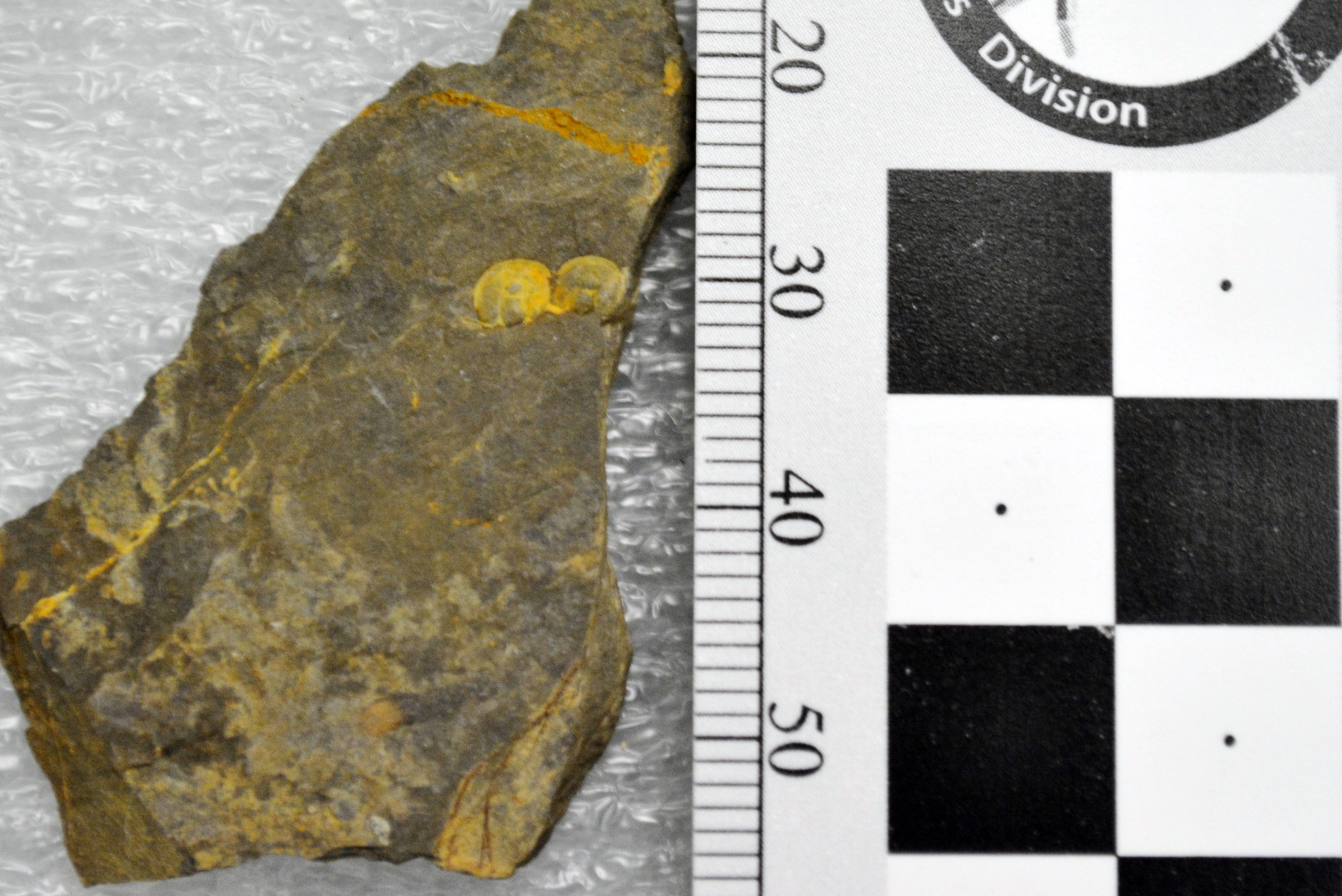
- Fossils from the Wolsey Shale
- Type: Formation
- Unit of: Gros Ventre Formation
- Underlies: Death Canyon Limestone
- Overlies: Flathead Sandstone

Location
- Region: Montana
- Country: United States

The Wolsey Shale is a geologic formation in Montana. It preserves fossils dating back to the Cambrian period.

== See also ==
- List of fossiliferous stratigraphic units in Montana
- Paleontology in Montana
