= Park Shale =

Geologic formation in Wyoming

- Stratigraphic range: Cambrian
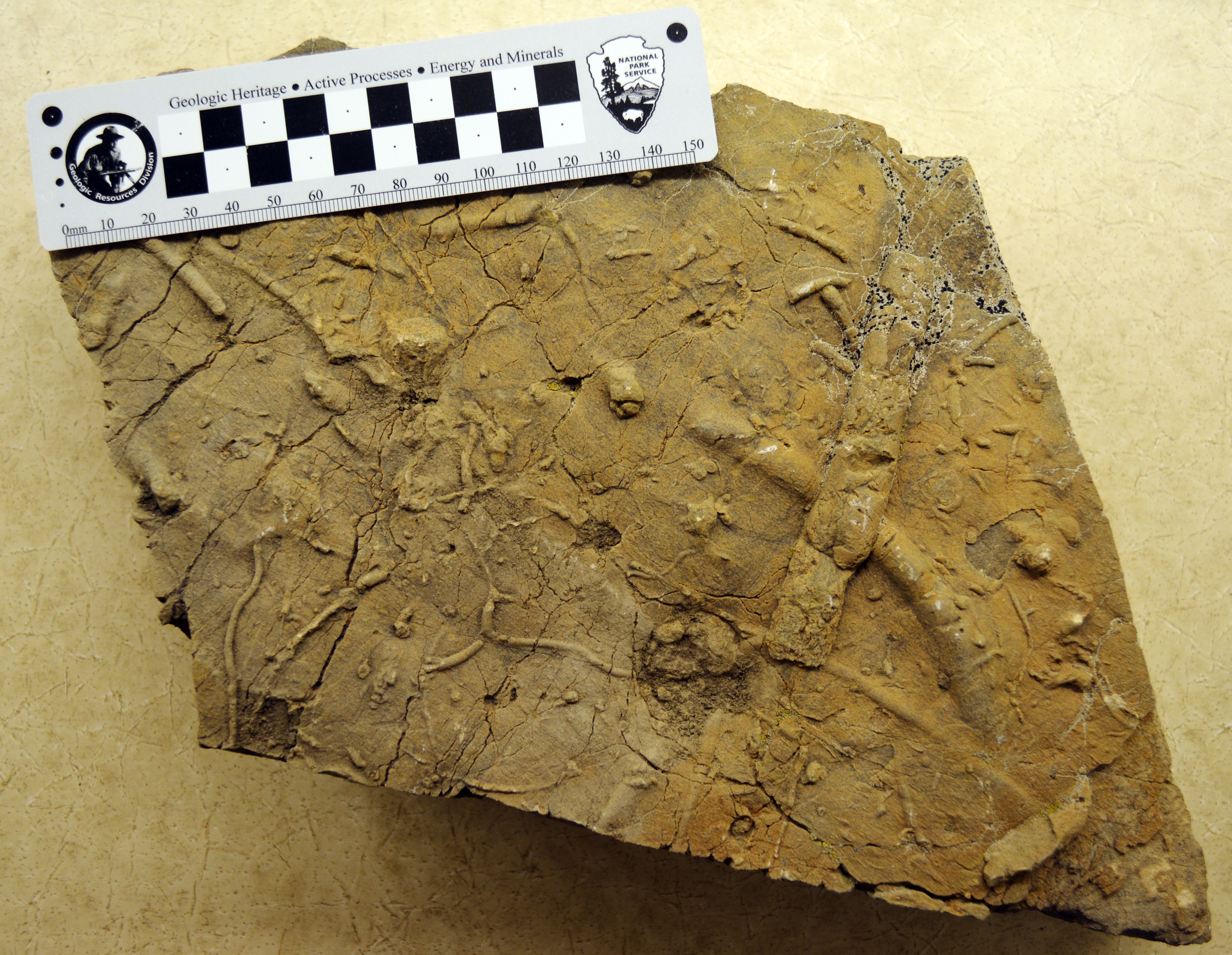
- Trace fossils from the Park Shale
- Type: Formation
- Unit of: Gros Ventre Formation

Location
- Region: Wyoming
- Country: United States

The Park Shale is a geologic formation in Wyoming. It preserves fossils dating back to the Cambrian period.

== See also ==
- List of fossiliferous stratigraphic units in Wyoming
- Paleontology in Wyoming
