= Skillet Glacier =

Glacier in the United States

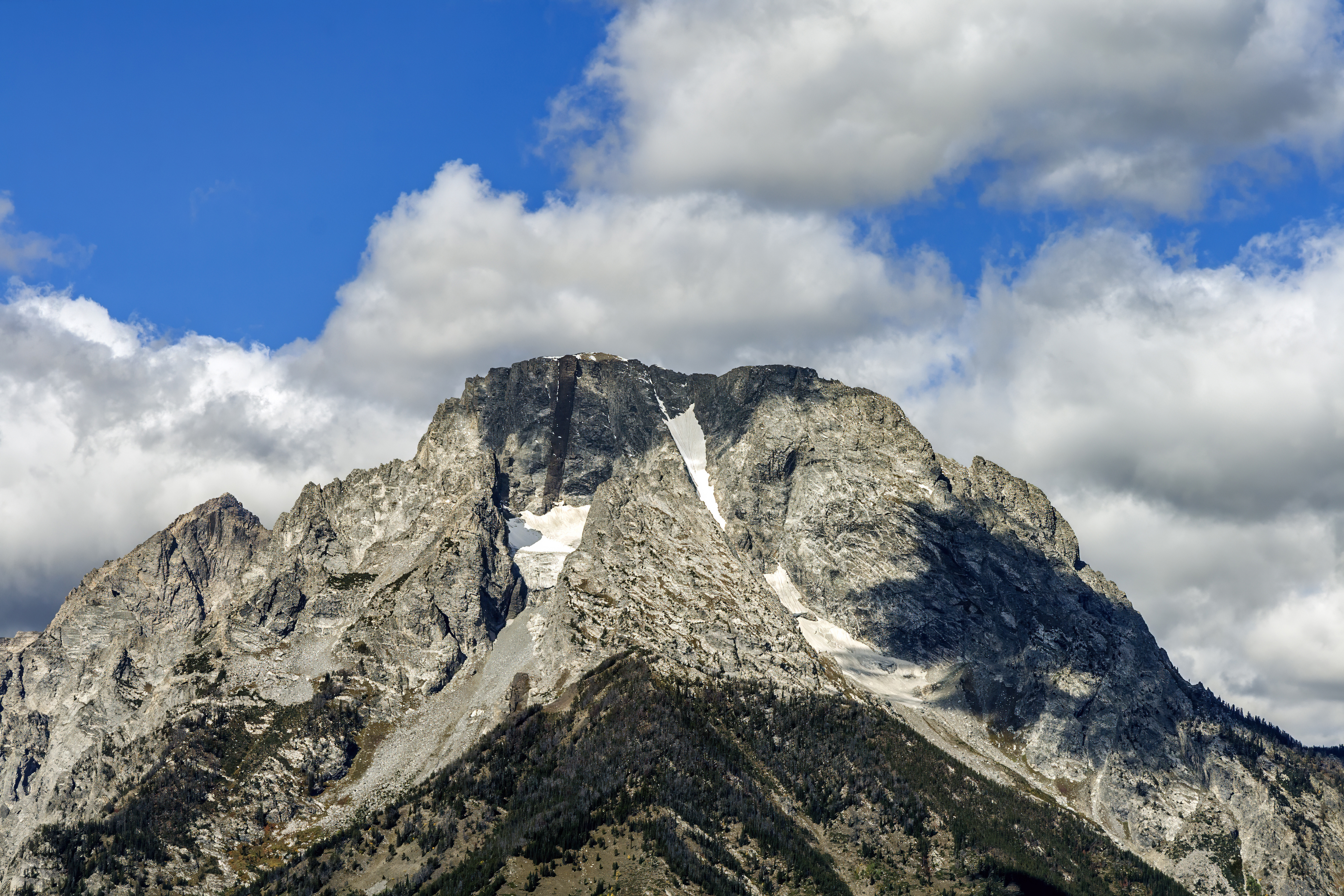
- Skillet Glacier on Mount Moran is at right. On the left is Falling Ice Glacier

- Location within Wyoming
- Type: Mountain glacier
- Location: Grand Teton National Park, Teton County, Wyoming, USA
- Coordinates: 43°50′12″N 110°45′57″W
- Area: 175 acres (0.71 km^{2})
- Length: 0.5 mi (0.80 km)
- Terminus: rockfall
- Status: unknown

Skillet Glacier is in Grand Teton National Park, Wyoming, United States. The glacier is situated on the eastern cliffs of Mount Moran and is easily seen from Jackson Hole. The shape of the glacier led to the naming as the uppermost section of the glacier is long and narrow and then broadens abruptly more than halfway down the mountain into a larger area, giving it the shape of a skillet or frying pan. The glacier is one of twelve that remain in Grand Teton National Park and one of five glaciers located on Mount Moran. Mountain climbers consider the Skillet Glacier route to be the fastest and one of the easiest ways to climb Mount Moran, and was the route taken when the peak was first climbed in 1922, though it is rarely used in late summer due to poor footing. On November 21, 1950, A DC-3 crashed into Mount Moran, adjacent to Skillet Glacier, killing all 21 passengers aboard. The remains of the passengers and the plane are still on the mountain.

== See also ==
- List of glaciers in the United States
- Geology of the Grand Teton area
