= Falling Ice Glacier =

Glacier in Wyoming, United States

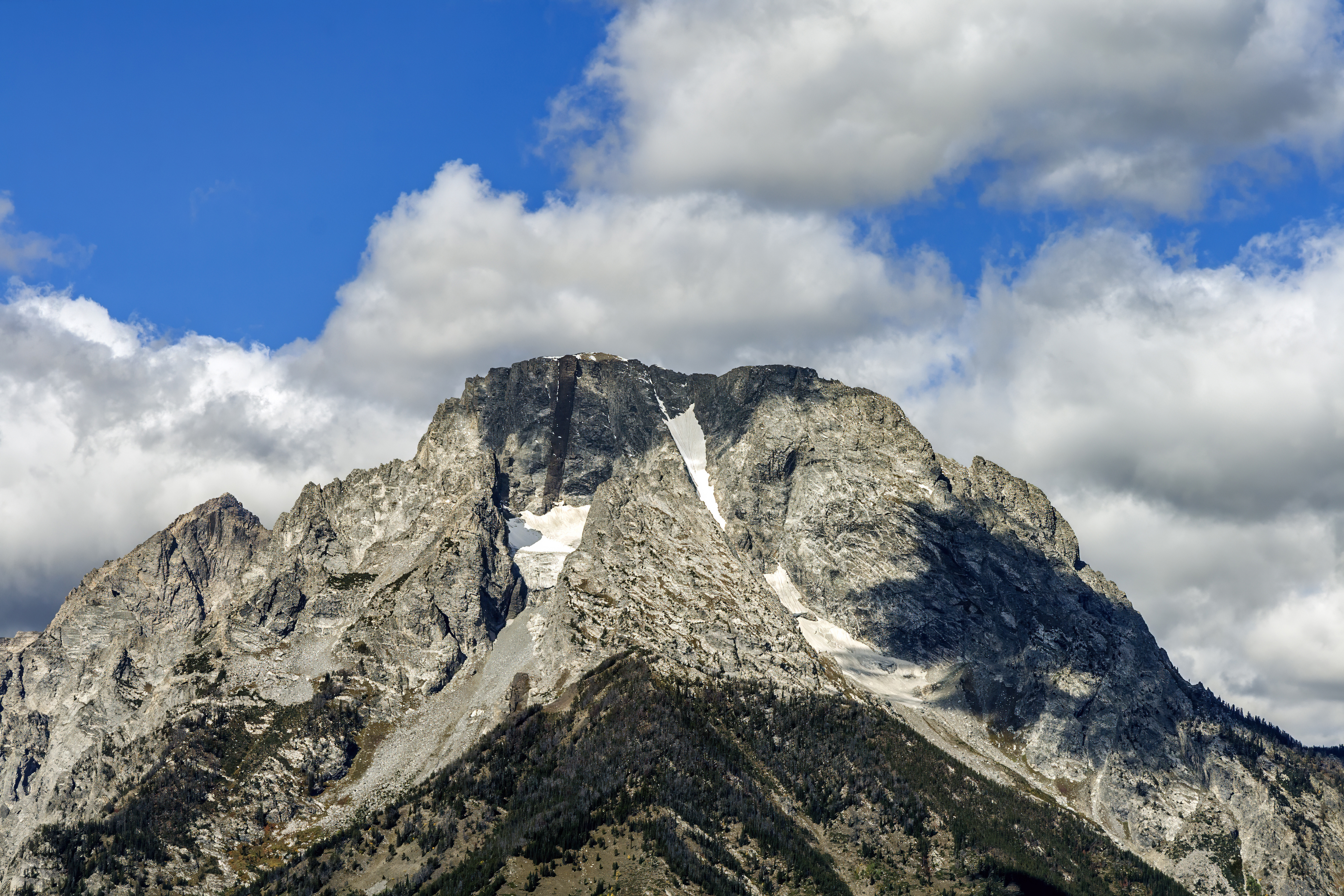
- Falling Ice Glacier on Mount Moran on left. The other glacier visible is Skillet Glacier at right

- Location within Wyoming
- Type: Mountain glacier
- Location: Grand Teton National Park, Teton County, Wyoming, USA
- Coordinates: 43°50′00″N 110°46′13″W
- Terminus: rockfall
- Status: unknown

Falling Ice Glacier is located in the Grand Teton National Park, Wyoming, United States. The glacier is situated on the southeastern cliffs of Mount Moran and can be seen from Jackson Hole. Runoff from the glacier flows into Leigh Lake. The glacier is located in a high altitude cirque and is along one of the major climbing routes to the summit of Mount Moran. All of the existing glaciers in Grand Teton National Park were created during the Little Ice Age (1350–1850 A.D.) and have been in a general state of retreat since the mid-19th century.

== See also ==
- List of glaciers in the United States
- Geology of the Grand Teton area
