= Gallatin Formation =

Geologic formation in Wyoming and Montana

- Stratigraphic range: Cambrian
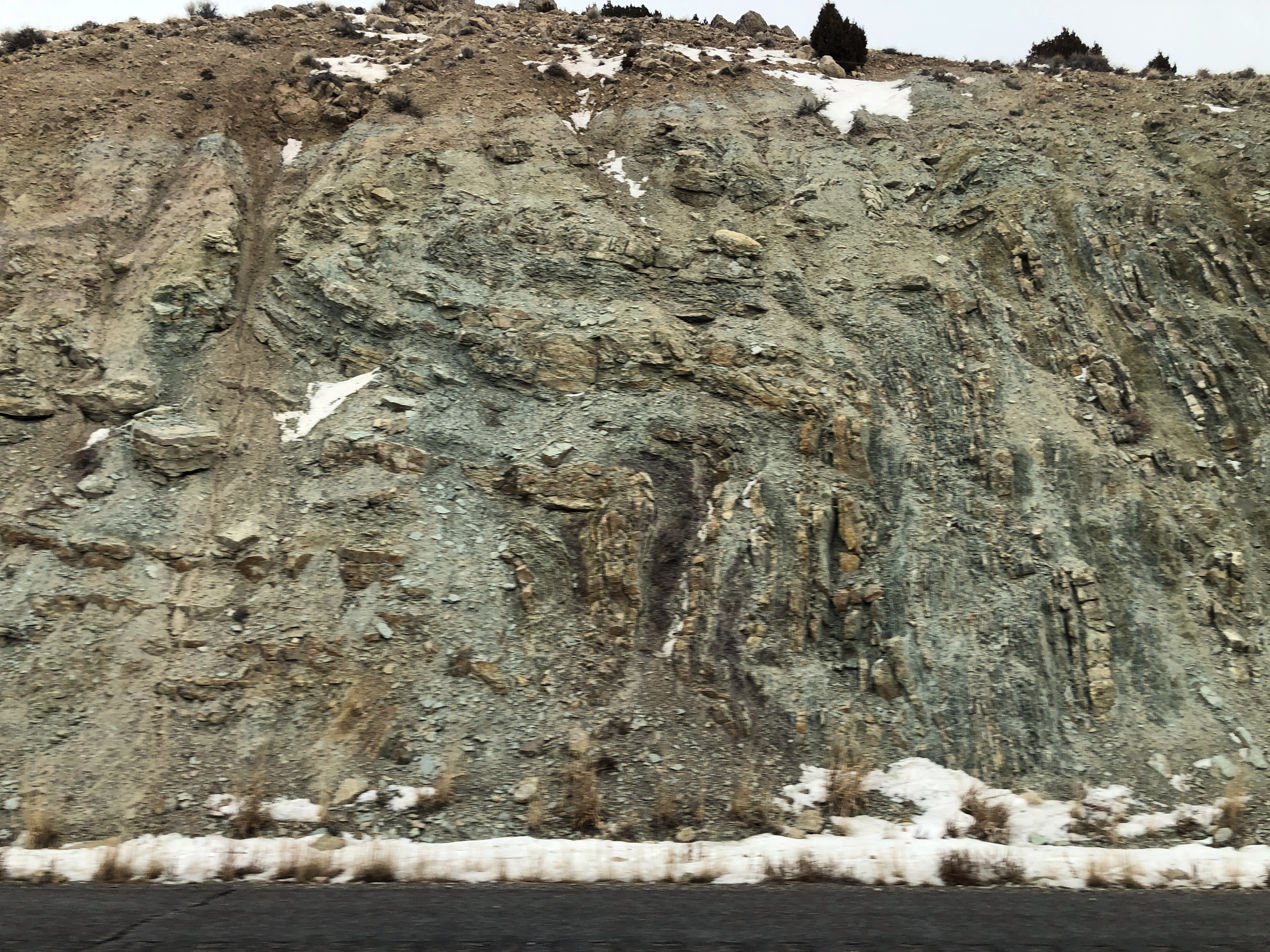
- Gallatin Formation with fault on the south side of the Big Horn Mountains
- Type: Formation
- Underlies: Bighorn Dolomite
- Overlies: Gros Ventre Formation
- Thickness: 180-300 feet

Lithology
- Primary: Limestone

Location
- Region: Wyoming, Montana
- Country: United States

The Gallatin Formation is a geologic formation in Wyoming and Montana. It preserves fossils dating back to the Cambrian period.

== See also ==
- List of fossiliferous stratigraphic units in Wyoming
- Paleontology in Wyoming
