= Darby Formation =

Geologic formation in Wyoming, United States

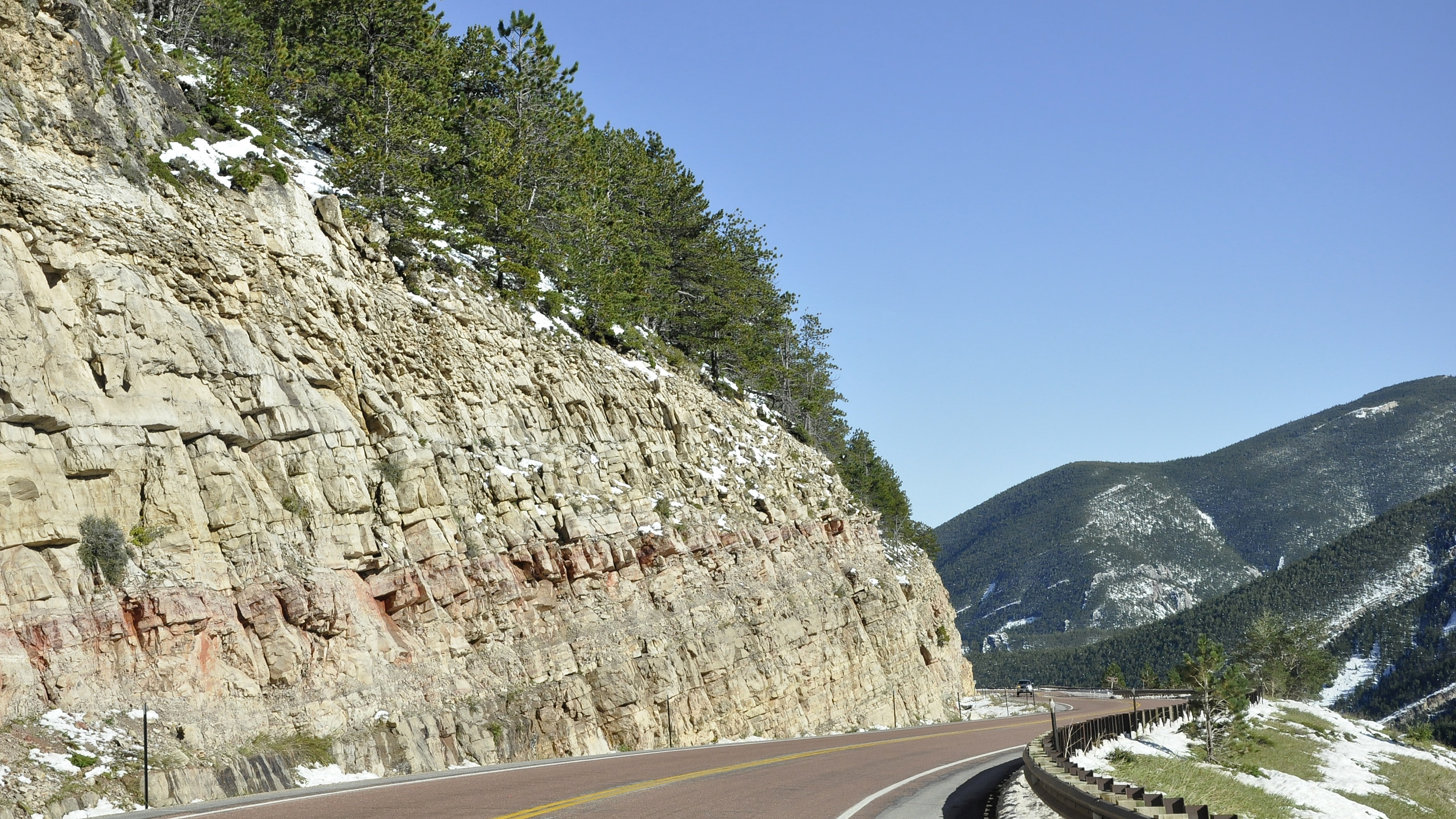
The Darby Formation at the Bighorn Scenic Byway

The Darby Formation is a Devonian geological formation. It consists mostly of dolomites and limestones that commonly contain discontinuous layers of calcareous shale or sandstone.

This formation underlies the Madison Formation in the Fossil Mountain in Wyoming. It is also visible at the Bighorn Scenic Byway.
