= Gros Ventre Formation =

Geologic formation in Wyoming, United States

- Stratigraphic range: Cambrian
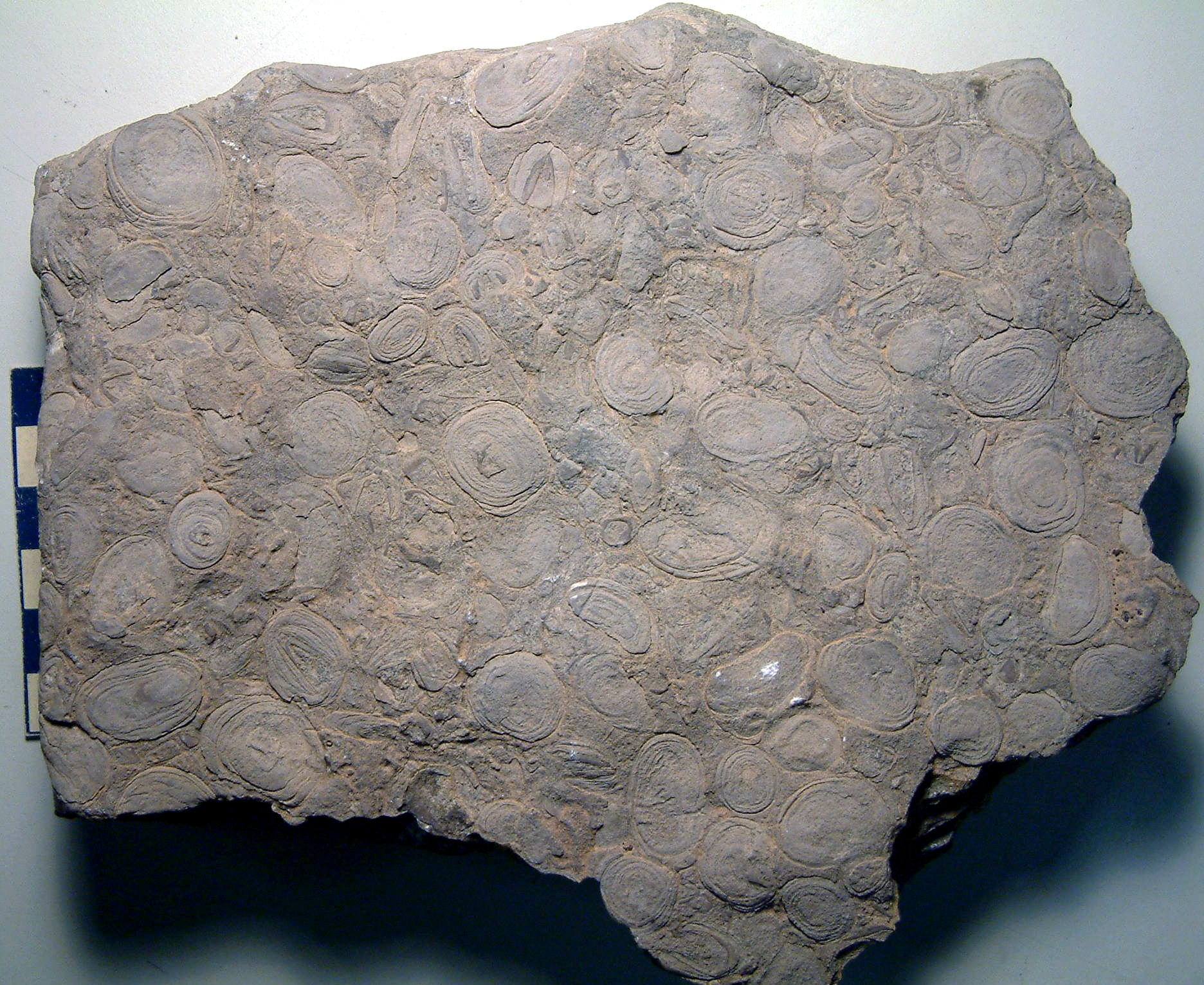
- Oncolitic limestone from the Gros Ventre Formation
- Type: Formation
- Sub-units: Wolsey Shale, Death Canyon Limestone, Park Shale
- Underlies: Gallatin Formation
- Overlies: Flathead Formation
- Thickness: 675 Feet

Lithology
- Primary: Shale, Limestone

Location
- Region: Wyoming
- Country: United States

The Gros Ventre Formation is a geologic formation in Wyoming, USA. It preserves fossils dating back to the Cambrian period. The Gros Ventre consists of three main members; the Wolsey Shale, the Death Canyon Limestone, and the Park Shale.

== See also ==
- List of fossiliferous stratigraphic units in Wyoming
- Paleontology in Wyoming
