= Mount Moran =

Mountain in Wyoming, United States

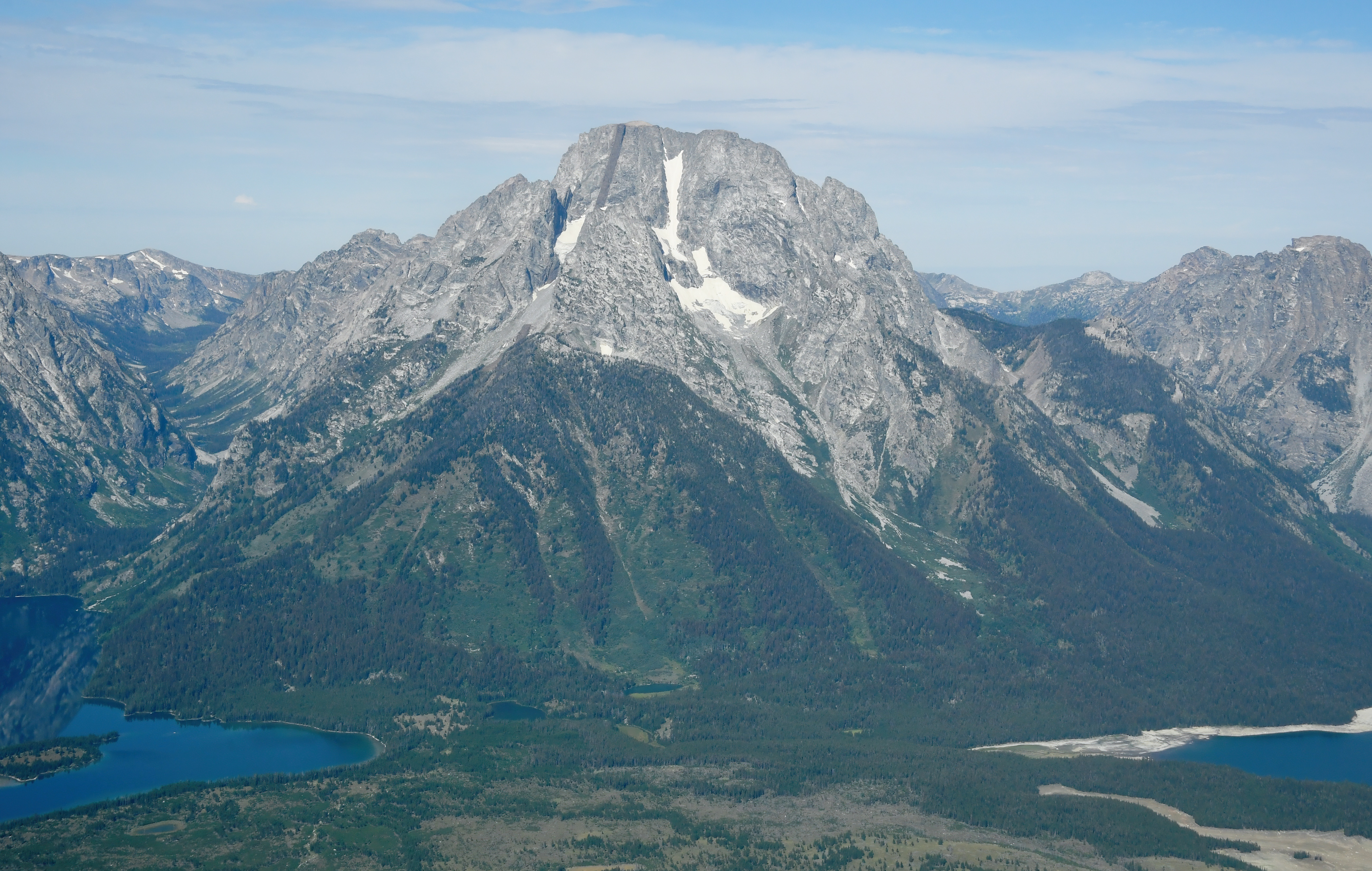
- Aerial view of Mount Moran from the east

Highest point
- Elevation: 12,610 ft (3,840 m)
- Prominence: 2,605 ft (794 m)
- Coordinates: 43°50′07″N 110°46′35″W

Geography
- Location within Wyoming
- Location: Grand Teton National Park, Teton County, Wyoming, U.S.
- Parent range: Teton Range
- Topo map: USGS Mount Moran

Climbing
- First ascent: LeGrand Hardy, Bennet McNulty, and Ben C. Rich, July 22, 1922
- Easiest route: CMC Face class 5.4

Mount Moran (12,610 feet (3,840 m)) is a mountain in Grand Teton National Park of western Wyoming, USA. The mountain is named for Thomas Moran, an American western frontier landscape artist. Mount Moran dominates the northern section of the Teton Range rising 6,000 feet (1,800 m) above Jackson Lake. Several active glaciers exist on the mountain with Skillet Glacier plainly visible on the monolithic east face. Like the Middle Teton in the same range, Mount Moran's face is marked by a distinctive basalt intrusion known as the Black Dike.

== Climbing ==
Mount Moran is a massive and impressive mountain which would make it attractive to mountaineers. However, the comparative difficulty of the approach to the climbs makes it a much less popular climb than the Grand Teton and other peaks to the south. No trails to Mount Moran have been maintained for over twenty years, and any approach overland requires a great deal of bushwhacking through vegetation, deadfalls, and bogs along the perimeter of Leigh Lake. Instead, most climbers choose to canoe from String Lake, across Leigh Lake and then pick their way to their respective route; but even this may require some overland route finding. As a result, most climbs on Mount Moran tend to take several days even when the technical portion of the climb is comparatively brief.

Aerial view of Mount Moran's western aspect, with Jackson Lake and the Absaroka Range to the east

The first ascent of Mount Moran was made on July 22, 1922 by LeGrand Hardy, Bennet McNulty, and Ben C. Rich of the Chicago Mountaineering Club, via the Skillet Glacier route. It still provides perhaps the easiest and most direct route to the summit, and is rated 5.4. As the name implies, most of the climb is on the steep snow and ice of Skillet Glacier, thus an ice axe and crampons are used during the ascent.

The most popular route up Mount Moran is the CMC route, named for the Chicago Mountaineering Club. The CMC is rated 5.5, and ascends the east face just south of the Black Dike. The CMC climbs good rock and is essentially free of snow and ice. It also has the advantage of a good camp high on the flank of the mountain.

The Direct South Buttress, a grade IV claim rated from 5.7 A3 to 5.9 C1, is a technical route suited for aid and Alpine climbing. It has a vertical gain of approximately 1,500 feet (460 m), and features 11 pitches. This route is featured in the historic climbing text Fifty Classic Climbs of North America, and was first ascended by Richard Emerson, Don Decker, and Leigh Ortenburger, August 30–31, 1953.

== Climate ==
Climate data for Mount Moran 43.8334 N, 110.7756 W, Elevation: 11,864 ft (3,616 m) (1991–2020 normals)
Month	Jan	Feb	Mar	Apr	May	Jun	Jul	Aug	Sep	Oct	Nov	Dec	Year
Mean daily maximum °F (°C)	19.4 (−7.0)	18.6 (−7.4)	23.4 (−4.8)	28.4 (−2.0)	38.0 (3.3)	48.9 (9.4)	59.3 (15.2)	58.6 (14.8)	49.5 (9.7)	36.6 (2.6)	24.7 (−4.1)	18.7 (−7.4)	35.3 (1.9)
Daily mean °F (°C)	10.1 (−12.2)	8.5 (−13.1)	12.7 (−10.7)	17.2 (−8.2)	26.1 (−3.3)	35.9 (2.2)	45.1 (7.3)	44.4 (6.9)	36.2 (2.3)	25.0 (−3.9)	15.5 (−9.2)	9.7 (−12.4)	23.9 (−4.5)
Mean daily minimum °F (°C)	0.8 (−17.3)	−1.7 (−18.7)	2.0 (−16.7)	5.9 (−14.5)	14.5 (−9.7)	23.0 (−5.0)	30.8 (−0.7)	30.2 (−1.0)	22.8 (−5.1)	13.4 (−10.3)	6.3 (−14.3)	0.7 (−17.4)	12.4 (−10.9)
Average precipitation inches (mm)	8.88 (226)	7.27 (185)	7.04 (179)	6.40 (163)	5.43 (138)	3.94 (100)	1.53 (39)	1.66 (42)	2.97 (75)	4.73 (120)	7.37 (187)	8.78 (223)	66 (1,677)
Source: PRISM Climate Group

== Incidents ==
On November 21, 1950, a DC-3C cargo plane owned by the New Tribes Mission crashed on Mount Moran during a storm, killing all 21 on board. A rescue party organized by Paul Petzoldt located the wreckage on November 25, but the extreme location of the crash made it impossible to recover the plane or the bodies. The wreckage remains on the mountain today, but the Park Service discourages climbs to the site.

On August 25, 1977 Gerald and Susan Huntley experienced a severe rappel accident while climbing the East Ridge of Mt. Moran. A rappel anchor failed and Gerald fell, fracturing his skull, spine and wrist. As Susan went for help, she fell and was killed after breaking her neck. Gerald survived with serious injuries.

On July 14, 1986, two women climbers fell uncontrollably while hiking on Mount Moran. Abigail Mackey was fatally injured and Nicola Rotberg was seriously injured after falling over 1,000 feet.

On May 17, 2015, Luke Lynch and Stephen P. Adamson Jr. were climbing Mount Moran's northeast face via The Sickle route when they were caught in a wet slough avalanche. Lynch was killed instantly and Adamson Jr. succumbed to his injuries days later.

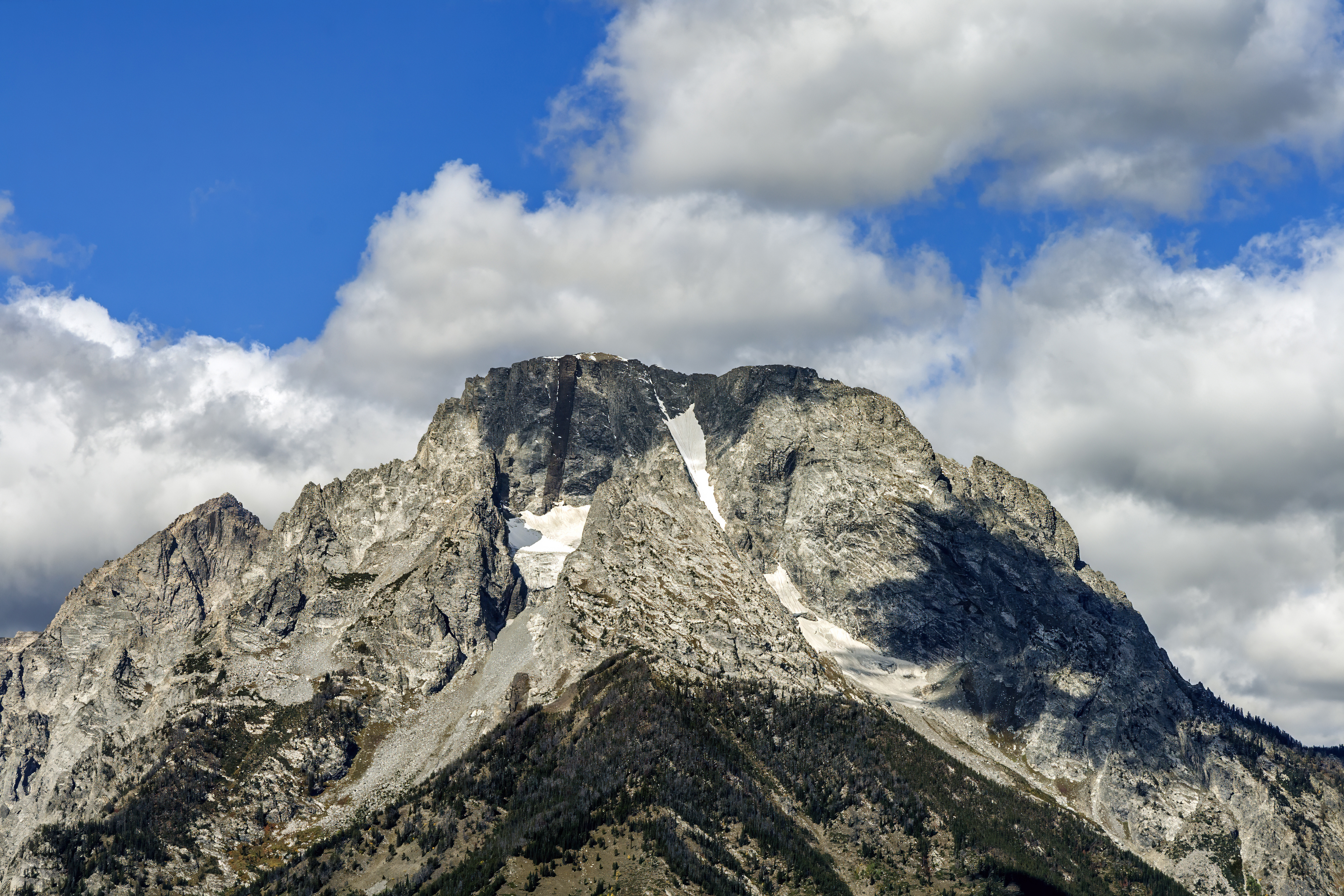
Mount Moran summit with Falling Ice Glacier at left and Skillet Glacier at right

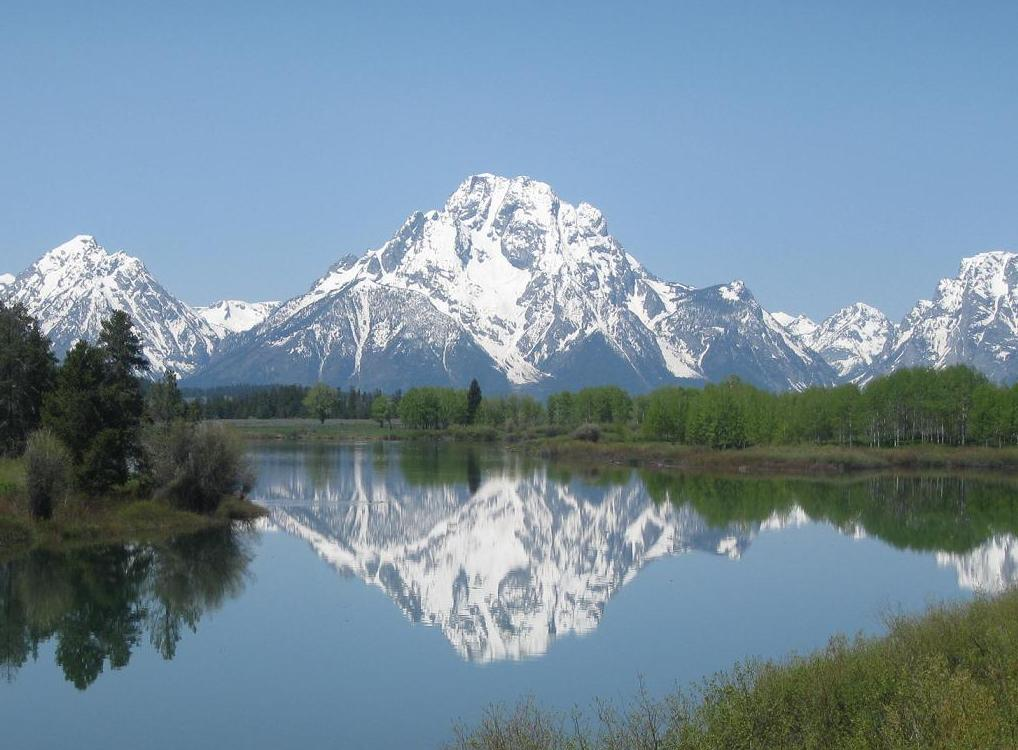
Mount Moran with the Snake River in the foreground

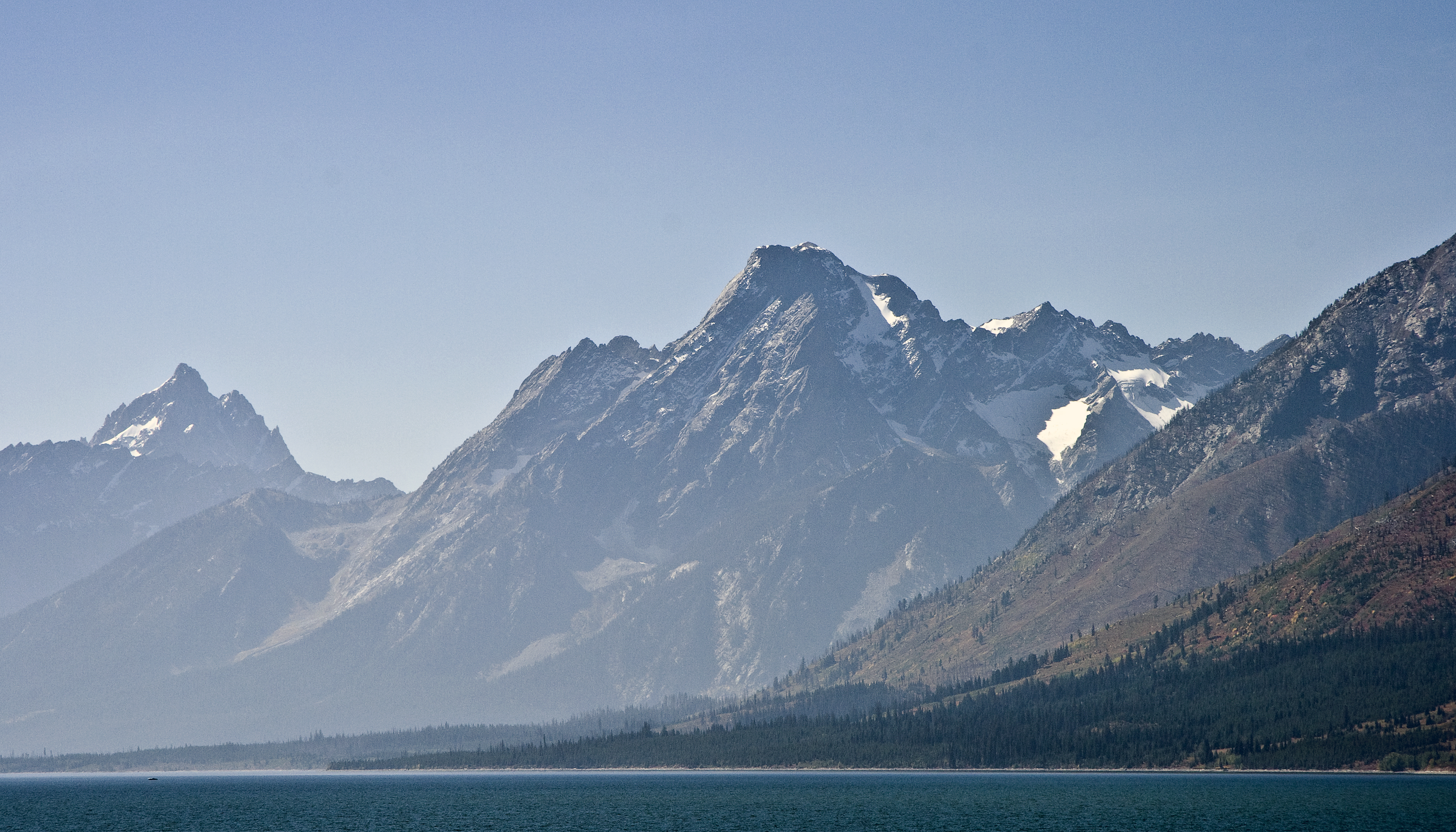
Mount Moran rises abruptly above Jackson Lake. Grand Teton can be seen in the background at left

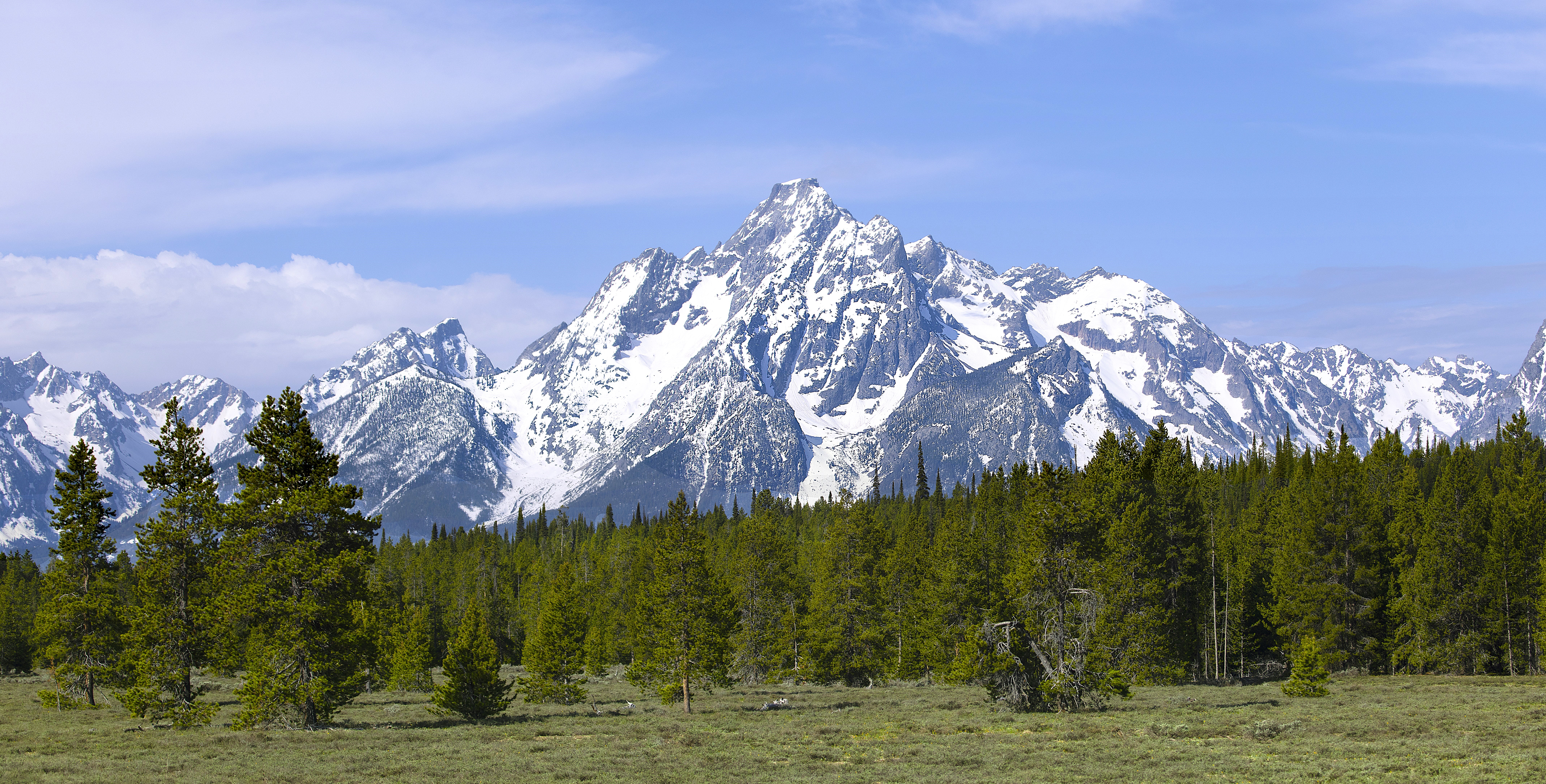
Northeast aspect

== See also ==
- Geology of the Grand Teton area
