= Bighorn Dolomite =

Ordovician geologic formation in Wyoming

- Stratigraphic range: Ordovician
- Type: Formation

Location
- Region: Wyoming
- Country: United States

The Bighorn Dolomite is a geologic formation in Wyoming. It preserves fossils dating back to the Ordovician period.

== See also ==
- List of fossiliferous stratigraphic units in Wyoming
- Paleontology in Wyoming
