= List of trails in Park County, Wyoming =

There are at least 100 named trails in Park County, Wyoming according to the U.S. Geological Survey, Board of Geographic Names. A trail is defined as: "Route for passage from one point to another; does not include roads or highways (jeep trail, path, ski trail)."

- Anderson Creek Trail, 44°04′5″N 109°26′42″W, el. 8,606 feet (2,623 m)
- Beartooth Highlakes Trail, 44°58′5″N 109°35′25″W, el. 9,767 feet (2,977 m)
- Beartooth Loop National Recreation Trail, 44°56′5″N 109°26′59″W, el. 10,141 feet (3,091 m)
- Beauty Lake Trail, 44°57′5″N 109°34′43″W, el. 9,403 feet (2,866 m)
- Beaver Lakes Loop Trail, 44°59′5″N 110°42′44″W, el. 6,532 feet (1,991 m)
- Beaver Lakes Loop Trail, 44°59′5″N 110°42′12″W, el. 6,388 feet (1,947 m)
- Bighorn Pass Trail, 44°53′5″N 110°53′22″W, el. 8,468 feet (2,581 m)
- Blackwater Trail, 44°26′5″N 109°45′27″W, el. 6,952 feet (2,119 m)
- Boulder Basin Trail, 44°05′5″N 109°28′35″W, el. 9,455 feet (2,882 m)
- Buffalo Plateau Trail, 44°59′5″N 110°24′26″W, el. 7,405 feet (2,257 m)
- Buffalo Plateau Trail, 44°59′5″N 110°17′27″W, el. 7,654 feet (2,333 m)
- Butte Creek Trail, 44°07′5″N 109°49′20″W, el. 8,917 feet (2,718 m)
- Cascade Creek Trail, 43°50′5″N 109°18′08″W, el. 10,827 feet (3,300 m)
- Clay Butte Trail, 44°57′5″N 109°37′58″W, el. 9,380 feet (2,860 m)
- Clear Creek Trail, 44°29′5″N 110°11′51″W, el. 8,238 feet (2,511 m)
- Copeland Lake Trail, 44°59′5″N 109°41′57″W, el. 8,730 feet (2,660 m)
- Cougar Creek Trail, 44°43′5″N 110°51′47″W, el. 7,858 feet (2,395 m)
- Coyote Creek Trail, 45°01′5″N 110°24′14″W, el. 7,451 feet (2,271 m)
- Coyote Creek Trail, 44°59′5″N 110°25′31″W, el. 6,440 feet (1,960 m)
- Crandall Cutoff Trail, 44°50′5″N 109°40′14″W, el. 6,611 feet (2,015 m)
- Crandall Trail, 44°48′5″N 109°50′38″W, el. 7,444 feet (2,269 m)
- Crazy Lakes Trail, 44°58′5″N 109°45′33″W, el. 8,084 feet (2,464 m)
- Crazy Mountain Trail, 44°59′5″N 109°44′35″W, el. 8,376 feet (2,553 m)
- Crescent Trail, 43°50′5″N 109°48′56″W, el. 8,976 feet (2,736 m)
- Fawn Pass Trail, 44°55′5″N 110°55′07″W, el. 9,009 feet (2,746 m)
- Fire Memorial Trail, 44°24′5″N 109°45′31″W, el. 7,424 feet (2,263 m)
- Frost Lake Trail, 44°39′5″N 110°01′14″W, el. 8,189 feet (2,496 m)
- Glacial Boulder Trail, 44°44′5″N 110°27′06″W, el. 8,077 feet (2,462 m)
- Gneiss Creek Trail, 44°43′5″N 110°59′14″W, el. 6,742 feet (2,055 m)
- Gooseberry Trail, 43°55′5″N 109°04′55″W, el. 7,628 feet (2,325 m)
- Granite Loop Trail, 44°57′5″N 109°38′58″W, el. 8,166 feet (2,489 m)
- Greybull River Trail, 43°58′5″N 109°24′15″W, el. 8,799 feet (2,682 m)
- Greybull River Trail, 43°53′5″N 109°19′35″W, el. 10,617 feet (3,236 m)
- Haymaker Timber Creek Trail, 44°02′5″N 109°21′10″W, el. 9,685 feet (2,952 m)
- Howard Eaton Trail, 44°44′5″N 110°43′39″W, el. 7,503 feet (2,287 m)
- Ice Lakes Trail, 44°43′5″N 110°38′11″W, el. 7,920 feet (2,410 m)
- Ishawooa Mesa Trail, 44°13′5″N 109°33′42″W, el. 7,224 feet (2,202 m)
- Ishawooa Trail, 44°15′5″N 109°32′46″W, el. 6,660 feet (2,030 m)
- Jack Creek Trail, 44°06′5″N 109°21′06″W, el. 7,631 feet (2,326 m)
- Jim Bridger Trail, 44°43′5″N 108°39′58″W, el. 4,167 feet (1,270 m)
- Jim Bridger Trail, 44°53′5″N 108°39′57″W, el. 4,258 feet (1,298 m)
- Jones Pass Trail, 44°31′5″N 110°11′44″W, el. 8,894 feet (2,711 m)
- Lake Reno Trail, 44°59′5″N 109°44′33″W, el. 8,320 feet (2,540 m)
- Lamar River Trail, 44°40′5″N 110°01′44″W, el. 7,431 feet (2,265 m)
- Lewis and Clark National Historic Trail, 44°51′5″N 109°33′02″W, el. 6,047 feet (1,843 m)
- Little Venus Cutoff Trail, 44°01′5″N 109°27′03″W, el. 9,252 feet (2,820 m)
- Lodgepole Trail, 44°46′5″N 109°38′44″W, el. 8,205 feet (2,501 m)
- Lost Lake Trail, 44°58′5″N 109°43′53″W, el. 7,913 feet (2,412 m)
- Lower Blacktail Trail, 44°59′5″N 110°34′44″W, el. 5,961 feet (1,817 m)
- Lower Blacktail Trail, 44°58′5″N 110°35′44″W, el. 6,427 feet (1,959 m)
- Marbel Mountain Trail, 44°01′5″N 109°25′48″W, el. 8,297 feet (2,529 m)
- Miller Creek Trail, 44°45′5″N 110°01′56″W, el. 7,359 feet (2,243 m)
- Mist Creek Trail, 44°37′5″N 110°06′26″W, el. 8,074 feet (2,461 m)
- Morrison Trail, 44°50′5″N 109°24′45″W, el. 9,327 feet (2,843 m)
- Mount Holmes Trail, 44°48′5″N 110°47′57″W, el. 7,661 feet (2,335 m)
- Mount Washburn Spur Trail, 44°47′5″N 110°24′43″W, el. 9,383 feet (2,860 m)
- Mountain Creek Trail, 44°17′5″N 110°00′19″W, el. 8,530 feet (2,600 m)
- Natural Bridge Trail, 44°23′5″N 109°47′36″W, el. 9,016 feet (2,748 m)
- North Crandall Trail, 44°53′5″N 109°50′52″W, el. 7,805 feet (2,379 m)
- Open Creek Trail, 44°10′5″N 109°54′56″W, el. 8,402 feet (2,561 m)
- Pahaska Sunlight Trail, 44°34′5″N 109°57′51″W, el. 7,057 feet (2,151 m)
- Papoose Trail, 44°46′5″N 109°47′22″W, el. 9,006 feet (2,745 m)
- Pass Creek Trail, 44°08′5″N 109°52′02″W, el. 8,619 feet (2,627 m)
- Pelican Cone Trail, 44°37′5″N 110°11′41″W, el. 8,543 feet (2,604 m)
- Pelican Creek Trail, 44°33′5″N 110°16′28″W, el. 7,887 feet (2,404 m)
- Pilot Creek Trail, 44°57′5″N 109°52′13″W, el. 7,789 feet (2,374 m)
- Piney Creek Trail, 44°06′5″N 109°21′08″W, el. 7,625 feet (2,324 m)
- Plateau Trail, 44°39′5″N 110°36′25″W, el. 8,304 feet (2,531 m)
- Reef Creek Trail, 44°49′5″N 109°34′53″W, el. 8,392 feet (2,558 m)
- Republic Trail, 44°59′5″N 109°56′23″W, el. 8,291 feet (2,527 m)
- Rescue Creek Trail, 45°00′5″N 110°38′48″W, el. 6,243 feet (1,903 m)
- Rescue Creek Trail, 44°58′5″N 110°37′07″W, el. 6,696 feet (2,041 m)
- Ribbon Lake Trail, 44°43′5″N 110°28′15″W, el. 7,775 feet (2,370 m)
- Sepulcher Loop Trail, 44°58′5″N 110°44′35″W, el. 8,254 feet (2,516 m)
- Sevenmile Hole Trail, 44°45′5″N 110°25′47″W, el. 7,999 feet (2,438 m)
- Shoshone Trail, 43°50′5″N 109°47′15″W, el. 8,396 feet (2,559 m)
- Smuggler Gulch Trail, 43°51′5″N 109°17′11″W, el. 11,148 feet (3,398 m)
- Sour Creek Trail, 44°42′5″N 110°28′20″W, el. 7,713 feet (2,351 m)
- South Fork Trail, 44°06′5″N 109°38′12″W, el. 6,601 feet (2,012 m)
- South Fork Trail, 43°59′5″N 109°41′37″W, el. 7,316 feet (2,230 m)
- South Piney Trail, 44°06′5″N 109°24′51″W, el. 9,705 feet (2,958 m)
- Specimen Ridge Trail, 44°51′5″N 110°17′50″W, el. 8,504 feet (2,592 m)
- Sportsman Lake Trail, 44°59′5″N 110°50′14″W, el. 8,645 feet (2,635 m)
- Squaw Creek Trail, 44°53′5″N 109°43′24″W, el. 8,392 feet (2,558 m)
- Table Mountain Trail, 44°24′5″N 109°29′46″W, el. 8,665 feet (2,641 m)
- Tern Lake Trail, 44°40′5″N 110°15′46″W, el. 8,228 feet (2,508 m)
- Thorofare Trail, 44°07′5″N 110°01′24″W, el. 8,054 feet (2,455 m)
- Thunderer Cutoff Trail, 44°55′5″N 110°03′42″W, el. 8,192 feet (2,497 m)
- Timber Creek Trail, 43°58′5″N 109°09′11″W, el. 9,199 feet (2,804 m)
- Trout Creek Trail, 44°34′5″N 109°26′13″W, el. 7,805 feet (2,379 m)
- Upper Granite Loop Trail, 44°58′5″N 109°38′28″W, el. 8,953 feet (2,729 m)
- Venus Basin Trail, 44°02′5″N 109°25′53″W, el. 8,248 feet (2,514 m)
- Vick Creek Cutoff Trail, 44°06′5″N 109°27′09″W, el. 9,764 feet (2,976 m)
- Wapiti Lake Trail, 44°42′5″N 110°19′12″W, el. 8,904 feet (2,714 m)
- Warhouse Trail, 44°06′5″N 109°24′57″W, el. 9,006 feet (2,745 m)
- Wolf Lake Trail, 44°43′5″N 110°36′50″W, el. 7,936 feet (2,419 m)
- Yellowstone River Trail, 44°59′5″N 110°28′30″W, el. 6,286 feet (1,916 m)
- Yellowstone Trail, 44°02′5″N 110°01′08″W, el. 8,202 feet (2,500 m)
- Zig-Zag Trail, 44°05′5″N 109°24′08″W, el. 8,166 feet (2,489 m)

== See also ==
- List of trails in Wyoming
