= Highline =

Highline, High Line, or Hi-Line may also refer to:

== Parks ==
- High Line, a park along a former elevated freight rail spur in Manhattan, New York City, United States.
- Camden Highline, an abandoned proposal for an elevated park in Camden Town, London, United Kingdom
- Highline Lake State Park, a Colorado state park
- Min Hi Line, a proposed linear park and shared-use path in Minneapolis, Minnesota, United States.

== Transport ==
=== Rail ===
- The Highline, a segment of the Western Pacific Railroad in Northern California, linking Portola with Bieber
- Highline Bridge (Kansas City, Kansas), an elevated line from Armourdale to Union Station
- Hi-Line, the name of a subdivision of the Northern Transcon railway, often applied to the entire line
  - Hi-Line (Montana), an area of northern Montana named for the railway
  - Hi-Line Railroad Bridge, a historic bridge on the railway located over the Sheyenne River in North Dakota
- West Philadelphia Elevated, also known as the West Philadelphia High Line, a section of the Harrisburg Subdivision railroad line in Pennsylvania

=== Waterways ===
- High Line Canal, a waterway in the Denver-Aurora Metropolitan Area of Colorado

== Schools ==
- Highline College, a community college in Des Moines, Washington
- Highline High School, a public high school in Burien, Washington

== Media ==
- Highline (band), Australian indie rock band
- The Hi-Line, a 1999 film

== Other ==
- High line, an overhead form of a picket line used to tie up horses
- HighLine, a development tool for the Ruby programming language
- Daihatsu Hi-Line, a series of trucks

== See also ==
- Highliner, a railcar
- High Liner Foods, a frozen seafood company
- High Lines, a 2005 album by Michael Galasso
- Highlining, a type of slacklining
- Viaduct, a multi-span elevated bridge
- Highline Trail (disambiguation), a number of higher-altitude or converted railroad highline trails
