= List of trails in Carbon County, Wyoming =

There are at least 13 named trails in Carbon County, Wyoming according to the U.S. Geological Survey, Board of Geographic Names. A trail is defined as: "Route for passage from one point to another; does not include roads or highways (jeep trail, path, ski trail)."

- Arlington Pack Trail, 41°28′5″N 106°10′39″W, el. 10,003 feet (3,049 m)
- Custer National Forest Trail, 45°02′5″N 109°19′59″W, el. 9,609 feet (2,929 m)
- Elkhorn Stock Driveway, 41°00′5″N 106°59′39″W, el. 8,451 feet (2,576 m)
- Emigrant Trail, 41°28′5″N 107°29′07″W, el. 7,247 feet (2,209 m)
- Fireline Trail, 41°00′5″N 106°51′44″W, el. 9,288 feet (2,831 m)
- Green Ridge Trail, 41°11′5″N 107°17′59″W, el. 8,314 feet (2,534 m)
- Main Fork Trail, 41°05′5″N 107°47′44″W, el. 6,306 feet (1,922 m)
- Medicine Bow Trail, 41°20′5″N 106°19′56″W, el. 11,558 feet (3,523 m)
- Sandstone Divide Trail, 41°08′5″N 107°17′24″W, el. 7,989 feet (2,435 m)
- State Line Trail (Wyoming), 40°59′5″N 106°40′02″W, el. 9,997 feet (3,047 m)
- State Line Trail (Wyoming), 41°00′5″N 106°38′46″W, el. 9,619 feet (2,932 m)
- Troublesome Trail, 41°25′5″N 106°33′55″W, el. 8,330 feet (2,540 m)

== See also ==
- List of trails in Wyoming
