= List of trails in Wyoming =

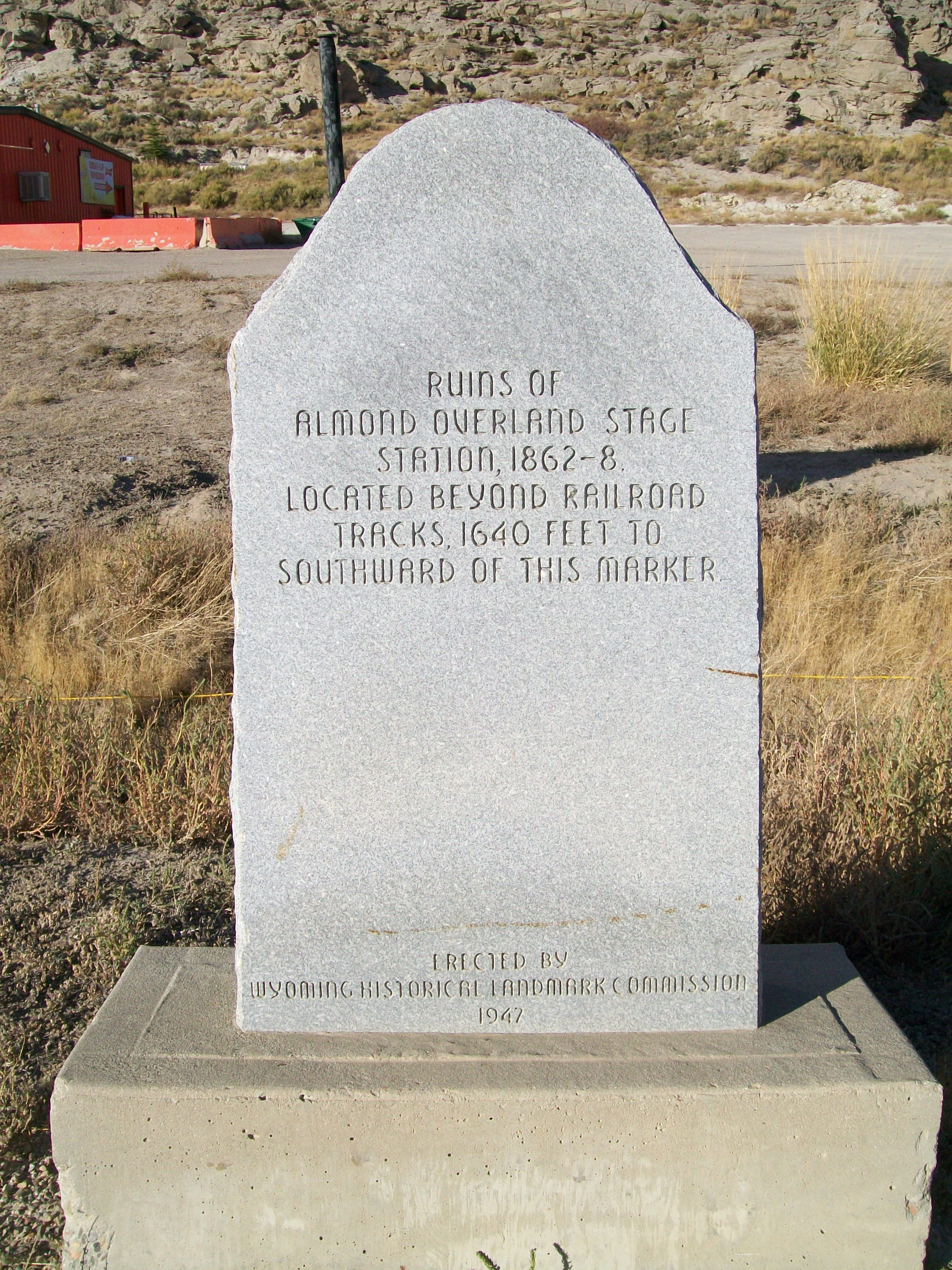
Overland trail marker, Sweetwater County, Wyoming

There are at least 429 named trails in Wyoming according to the U.S. Geological Survey, Board of Geographic Names. A trail is defined as: "Route for passage from one point to another; does not include roads or highways (jeep trail, path, ski trail)."

- Albany County, Wyoming
  - Brady Rock Trail, 41°12′5″N 105°21′09″W, el. 8,159 feet (2,487 m)
  - Buford Trail, 41°09′5″N 105°19′08″W, el. 8,005 feet (2,440 m)
  - Circle Trail, 41°21′5″N 106°17′33″W, el. 10,810 feet (3,290 m)
  - Horse Creek Trail, 41°17′5″N 105°22′25″W, el. 8,094 feet (2,467 m)
  - Lakes Trail, 41°20′5″N 106°19′04″W, el. 10,682 feet (3,256 m)
  - Lincoln Trail, 41°13′5″N 105°25′52″W, el. 8,524 feet (2,598 m)
  - Overland Trail, 41°29′5″N 106°01′20″W, el. 7,661 feet (2,335 m)
  - Overland Trail, 41°05′5″N 105°31′44″W, el. 7,621 feet (2,323 m)
  - Pole Mountain Trail, 41°14′5″N 105°24′44″W, el. 8,884 feet (2,708 m)
  - Ridge Camp Trail, 41°20′5″N 105°25′49″W, el. 8,448 feet (2,575 m)
- Big Horn County, Wyoming
  - List of trails in Big Horn County, Wyoming
- Carbon County, Wyoming
  - List of trails in Carbon County, Wyoming
- Crook County, Wyoming
  - Geis Trail, 44°41′5″N 104°19′39″W, el. 4,547 feet (1,386 m)
  - Lanning Trail, 44°35′5″N 104°19′48″W, el. 4,990 feet (1,520 m)
  - Nilson Trail, 44°40′5″N 104°20′06″W, el. 4,655 feet (1,419 m)
  - Rauth Trail, 44°38′5″N 104°24′16″W, el. 4,760 feet (1,450 m)
  - Simmons Trail, 44°38′5″N 104°25′34″W, el. 4,780 feet (1,460 m)
  - Table Mountain Trail, 44°36′5″N 104°18′32″W, el. 4,797 feet (1,462 m)
- Fremont County, Wyoming
  - List of trails in Fremont County, Wyoming
- Hot Springs County, Wyoming
  - Rock Creek Trail, 43°47′5″N 109°10′30″W, el. 10,971 feet (3,344 m)
  - Wind River Trail, 43°50′5″N 109°03′18″W, el. 10,043 feet (3,061 m)
  - Wind River Trail, 43°48′5″N 109°13′23″W, el. 8,868 feet (2,703 m)
- Johnson County, Wyoming
  - Angeline Trail, 44°18′5″N 107°03′43″W, el. 9,698 feet (2,956 m)
  - Bozeman Trail, 44°00′5″N 106°26′35″W, el. 4,803 feet (1,464 m)
  - Cash Trail, 43°52′5″N 106°54′06″W, el. 6,719 feet (2,048 m)
  - Penrose Park Trail, 44°31′5″N 107°04′04″W, el. 8,245 feet (2,513 m)
- Laramie County, Wyoming
  - Lattas Ranch Trail, 41°09′5″N 105°18′41″W, el. 7,838 feet (2,389 m)
- Lincoln County, Wyoming
  - Emigrant Trail, 41°58′5″N 110°11′14″W, el. 6,624 feet (2,019 m)
  - Oregon Trail - Lander Cutoff, 42°28′5″N 110°49′25″W, el. 7,474 feet (2,278 m)
  - Pine Creek Trail, 42°07′5″N 110°24′12″W, el. 7,684 feet (2,342 m)
  - Smiths Fork Greys River Stock Driveway, 42°28′5″N 110°48′33″W, el. 7,516 feet (2,291 m)
  - Stewart Trail, 43°04′5″N 110°45′54″W, el. 7,657 feet (2,334 m)
  - Wyoming Range Trail, 42°48′5″N 110°38′12″W, el. 9,951 feet (3,033 m)
- Natrona County, Wyoming
  - Bates Hole Stock Trail, 42°35′5″N 106°31′00″W, el. 5,695 feet (1,736 m)
  - E-k Trail, 43°22′5″N 107°16′24″W, el. 8,668 feet (2,642 m)
  - Okie Trail, 43°17′5″N 107°28′34″W, el. 6,214 feet (1,894 m)
- Park County, Wyoming
  - List of trails in Park County, Wyoming
- Sheridan County, Wyoming
  - Bear Gulch Trail, 44°38′5″N 107°07′43″W, el. 5,682 feet (1,732 m)
  - Dry Fork Trail, 44°50′5″N 107°34′06″W, el. 7,677 feet (2,340 m)
  - Dry Fork Trail, 44°55′5″N 107°38′17″W, el. 6,657 feet (2,029 m)
  - Game Creek Trail, 44°37′5″N 107°15′06″W, el. 8,087 feet (2,465 m)
  - Little Horn Trail, 44°55′5″N 107°41′13″W, el. 5,607 feet (1,709 m)
  - Roosevelt Trail, 44°43′5″N 107°15′37″W, el. 7,638 feet (2,328 m)
  - Stockwell Trail, 44°33′5″N 107°03′09″W, el. 7,766 feet (2,367 m)
  - Story Penrose Trail, 44°33′5″N 106°57′36″W, el. 6,808 feet (2,075 m)
  - Tepee Trail, 44°37′5″N 107°08′56″W, el. 7,395 feet (2,254 m)
  - Wolf Creek Trail, 44°43′5″N 107°20′00″W, el. 8,169 feet (2,490 m)

- Sublette County, Wyoming
  - List of trails in Sublette County, Wyoming
- Sweetwater County, Wyoming
  - Canyon Road Trail, 41°00′5″N 109°26′54″W, el. 6,460 feet (1,970 m)
  - Emigrant Trail, 41°54′5″N 109°47′36″W, el. 6,325 feet (1,928 m)
  - Emigrant Trail, 42°15′5″N 109°49′11″W, el. 7,067 feet (2,154 m)
  - Emigrant Trail, 42°15′5″N 109°14′34″W, el. 6,847 feet (2,087 m)
  - Overland Trail, 41°37′5″N 108°45′17″W, el. 6,558 feet (1,999 m)
- Teton County, Wyoming
  - List of trails in Teton County, Wyoming
- Uinta County, Wyoming
  - Emigrant Trail, 41°09′5″N 111°01′05″W, el. 6,955 feet (2,120 m)
  - Emigrant Trail, 41°09′5″N 110°58′44″W, el. 6,972 feet (2,125 m)
  - Emigrant Trail, 41°28′5″N 110°27′40″W, el. 6,624 feet (2,019 m)
  - Emigrant Trail, 41°30′5″N 110°07′56″W, el. 6,443 feet (1,964 m)
  - Emigrant Trail, 41°10′5″N 110°46′00″W, el. 7,713 feet (2,351 m)

== See also ==
- List of trails of Montana
- Emigrant Trail in Wyoming
- Trails of Yellowstone National Park
