= List of trails in Big Horn County, Wyoming =

There are at least 13 named trails in Big Horn County, Wyoming according to the U.S. Geological Survey, Board of Geographic Names. A trail is defined as: "Route for passage from one point to another; does not include roads or highways (jeep trail, path, ski trail)."

- Adelaide Trail, el. 8,008 feet (2,441 m)
- Bench Trail, el. 7,359 feet (2,243 m)
- Burnt Trail, el. 5,771 feet (1,759 m)
- Cliff Lake Trail, el. 10,298 feet (3,139 m)
- Dry Horse Trail, el. 7,592 feet (2,314 m)
- Edelman Trail, el. 9,636 feet (2,937 m)
- Elkhorn Trail, el. 7,293 feet (2,223 m)
- Kinky White Trail, el. 8,609 feet (2,624 m)
- Main Paint Rock Trail, el. 8,553 feet (2,607 m)
- Mistymoon Trail, el. 9,413 feet (2,869 m)
- North High Park Trail, el. 9,623 feet (2,933 m)
- Solitude Trail, el. 10,663 feet (3,250 m)

== See also ==
- List of trails in Wyoming

== Notes ==
44°32′5″N 107°28′42″W 44°34′5″N 107°34′59″W 44°55′5″N 108°03′04″W 44°25′5″N 107°14′06″W 44°37′5″N 107°42′21″W 44°26′5″N 107°20′19″W 44°39′5″N 107°43′30″W 44°21′5″N 107°21′32″W 44°21′5″N 107°20′26″W 44°17′5″N 107°13′04″W 44°23′5″N 107°20′50″W 44°22′5″N 107°04′02″W
