= Highline Trail =

Highline Trail or High Line Trail may refer to:

- Highline Trail in Canmore, Alberta, Canada

== United States ==
- Highline National Recreation Trail, in Arizona
- Highline Canal National Recreation Trail, in Denver, Colorado
- Highline Loop National Recreation Trail, a Colorado trail in Montezuma and La Plata counties
- Frisco Highline Trail, in Springfield, Missouri
- Highline Trail (Glacier National Park), in Montana
- Uinta Highline Trail, in Utah
- Highline Trail, in Mount Adams Recreation Area, Washington
- Highline Trail, a trail in Sublette County, Wyoming
- Granite Highline Trail, a trail in Teton County, Wyoming
