= List of trails in Sublette County, Wyoming =

The path followed by the Oregon Trail, California Trail and Mormon Trail (collectively referred to as the Emigrant Trail) spans 400 miles (640 km) through the U.S. state of Wyoming. (The name on the map titled "South Pass" is in southwestern Wyoming.)

There are at least 92 named trails in Sublette County, Wyoming according to the U.S. Geological Survey, Board of Geographic Names. A trail is defined as: "Route for passage from one point to another; does not include roads or highways (jeep trail, path, ski trail)."

- Baldy Lake Trail, 42°59′5″N 109°34′05″W, el. 10,968 feet (3,343 m)
- Bell Lakes Trail, 42°59′5″N 109°35′30″W, el. 10,390 feet (3,170 m)
- Big Sunday Trail, 42°43′5″N 109°13′58″W, el. 9,560 feet (2,910 m)
- Bluff Creek Trail, 43°03′5″N 109°51′28″W, el. 8,960 feet (2,730 m)
- Boulder Basin Trail, 43°08′5″N 109°55′54″W, el. 9,317 feet (2,840 m)
- Boulder Canyon Trail, 42°52′5″N 109°31′48″W, el. 8,366 feet (2,550 m)
- Boundary Creek Trail, 42°44′5″N 109°21′47″W, el. 9,678 feet (2,950 m)
- Burnt Lake Trail, 42°53′5″N 109°39′00″W, el. 7,920 feet (2,410 m)
- Chilcoot Trail, 42°46′5″N 109°25′53″W, el. 9,649 feet (2,941 m)
- Clear Creek Trail, 43°17′5″N 109°48′51″W, el. 8,136 feet (2,480 m)
- Cook Lake Trail, 43°02′5″N 109°35′44″W, el. 10,216 feet (3,114 m)
- Cottonwood Trail, 42°45′5″N 109°24′45″W, el. 9,570 feet (2,920 m)
- Crossover Trail, 42°49′5″N 109°22′09″W, el. 10,236 feet (3,120 m)
- Crows Nest Trail, 42°37′5″N 109°14′32″W, el. 8,947 feet (2,727 m)
- Crows Nest Trail, 42°38′5″N 109°13′07″W, el. 9,547 feet (2,910 m)
- Diamond Lake Trail, 42°42′5″N 109°15′30″W, el. 9,508 feet (2,898 m)
- Doubletop Mountain Trail, 43°07′5″N 109°48′28″W, el. 10,459 feet (3,188 m)
- Dream Lake Trail, 42°51′5″N 109°25′16″W, el. 9,849 feet (3,002 m)
- Dutch Joe Larsen Creek Trail, 42°36′5″N 109°09′40″W, el. 9,308 feet (2,837 m)
- Elkhart Loop Ski Trail, 42°59′5″N 109°44′03″W, el. 9,675 feet (2,949 m)
- Emigrant Trail, 42°37′5″N 109°31′12″W, el. 7,159 feet (2,182 m)
- Emigrant Trail, 42°35′5″N 110°01′22″W, el. 6,929 feet (2,112 m)
- Emigrant Trail, 42°28′5″N 110°33′23″W, el. 8,241 feet (2,512 m)
- Emigrant Trail, 42°32′5″N 109°21′14″W, el. 7,421 feet (2,262 m)
- Europe Canyon Trail, 42°56′5″N 109°27′26″W, el. 10,761 feet (3,280 m)
- Fayette Cutoff Trail, 42°55′5″N 109°42′02″W, el. 7,999 feet (2,438 m)
- Fayette Lake Trail, 42°54′5″N 109°41′31″W, el. 8,297 feet (2,529 m)
- Firehole Trail, 42°53′5″N 109°27′32″W, el. 10,121 feet (3,085 m)
- Francis Lake Tail, 42°44′5″N 109°18′18″W, el. 9,521 feet (2,902 m)
- Fremont Trail, 42°59′5″N 109°21′35″W, el. 11,798 feet (3,596 m)
- Fremout Driveway, 42°37′5″N 109°16′32″W, el. 8,756 feet (2,669 m)
- Glimpse Lake Trail, 43°01′5″N 109°48′12″W, el. 9,085 feet (2,769 m)
- Grouse Mountain Ski Trail, 42°56′5″N 109°42′44″W, el. 8,829 feet (2,691 m)
- Hailey Pass Trail, 42°48′5″N 109°17′43″W, el. 10,335 feet (3,150 m)
- Half Moon Trail, 42°54′5″N 109°42′15″W, el. 7,638 feet (2,328 m)
- Halls Lake Trail, 42°53′5″N 109°24′53″W, el. 10,003 feet (3,049 m)
- Hay Pass Trail, 42°58′5″N 109°30′31″W, el. 10,239 feet (3,121 m)
- Heart Lake Trail, 44°15′5″N 110°29′51″W, el. 7,484 feet (2,281 m)
- High Line Trail, 43°06′5″N 110°32′48″W, el. 9,619 feet (2,932 m)
- Highline Trail, 43°23′5″N 109°51′55″W, el. 9,573 feet (2,918 m)
- Highline Trail, 42°44′5″N 109°19′31″W, el. 9,508 feet (2,898 m)
- Horseshoe Lake Trail, 42°55′5″N 109°34′53″W, el. 9,564 feet (2,915 m)
- Indian Pass Trail, 43°05′5″N 109°37′48″W, el. 10,561 feet (3,219 m)
- Jim Creek Trail, 43°12′5″N 109°52′02″W, el. 10,417 feet (3,175 m)
- Jim Lake Trail, 42°42′5″N 109°23′37″W, el. 8,651 feet (2,637 m)
- Lake Ethel Trail, 42°53′5″N 109°32′28″W, el. 9,258 feet (2,822 m)
- Lake Isabella Trail, 42°53′5″N 109°28′11″W, el. 9,665 feet (2,946 m)
- Lakeside Trail, 43°17′5″N 109°51′09″W, el. 7,989 feet (2,435 m)
- Little Half Moon Trail, 42°54′5″N 109°41′00″W, el. 8,730 feet (2,660 m)
- Little Sandy Trail, 42°37′5″N 109°07′43″W, el. 9,436 feet (2,876 m)
- Long Lake Trail, 43°01′5″N 109°46′06″W, el. 7,467 feet (2,276 m)
- Lowline Trail, 43°03′5″N 109°52′49″W, el. 8,340 feet (2,540 m)
- Lowline Trail, 42°47′5″N 109°27′17″W, el. 9,462 feet (2,884 m)
- Middle Fork Trail, 42°55′5″N 109°22′33″W, el. 10,292 feet (3,137 m)
- New Fork Canyon Trail, 43°07′5″N 109°54′20″W, el. 7,871 feet (2,399 m)
- New Fork Trail, 43°10′5″N 109°47′06″W, el. 10,928 feet (3,331 m)
- North Fork Trail, 42°52′5″N 109°37′34″W, el. 8,602 feet (2,622 m)
- Old Indian Trail, 42°51′5″N 110°26′57″W, el. 8,054 feet (2,455 m)
- Palmer Lake Trail, 43°07′5″N 109°49′09″W, el. 10,266 feet (3,129 m)
- Park Loop Ski Trail, 42°56′5″N 109°45′02″W, el. 8,163 feet (2,488 m)
- Pine Creek Canyon Trail, 43°05′5″N 109°46′48″W, el. 9,757 feet (2,974 m)
- Pole Creek Trail, 43°00′5″N 109°42′17″W, el. 10,170 feet (3,100 m)
- Porcupine Trail, 43°14′5″N 109°51′23″W, el. 9,108 feet (2,776 m)
- Pot Creek Trail, 43°10′5″N 109°56′51″W, el. 8,720 feet (2,660 m)
- Pyramid Lake Trail, 42°49′5″N 109°18′06″W, el. 10,357 feet (3,157 m)
- Roaring Fork Trail, 43°21′5″N 109°48′35″W, el. 9,042 feet (2,756 m)
- Ruff Lake Trail, 42°52′5″N 109°35′33″W, el. 9,199 feet (2,804 m)
- Sage Basin Trail, 42°48′5″N 109°29′16″W, el. 9,586 feet (2,922 m)
- Sawmill Park Trail, 43°14′5″N 110°06′23″W, el. 9,173 feet (2,796 m)
- Scab Creek Trail, 42°50′5″N 109°24′33″W, el. 9,974 feet (3,040 m)
- Scab Lake Trail, 42°47′5″N 109°31′06″W, el. 9,488 feet (2,892 m)
- Scab Sage Trail, 42°48′5″N 109°29′51″W, el. 9,570 feet (2,920 m)
- Section Corner Lake Trail, 43°04′5″N 109°50′49″W, el. 9,465 feet (2,885 m)
- Seneca Lake Trail, 43°02′5″N 109°40′23″W, el. 10,115 feet (3,083 m)
- Shadow Lake Trail, 42°47′5″N 109°15′53″W, el. 10,193 feet (3,107 m)
- Shannon Pass Trail, 43°08′5″N 109°42′03″W, el. 11,135 feet (3,394 m)
- Silver Lake Trail, 42°48′5″N 109°22′47″W, el. 10,105 feet (3,080 m)
- Slide Lake Trail, 43°17′5″N 109°48′12″W, el. 9,025 feet (2,751 m)
- Snake Lake Trail, 43°02′5″N 109°49′44″W, el. 7,733 feet (2,357 m)
- South Gypsum Trail, 43°14′5″N 109°54′41″W, el. 9,534 feet (2,906 m)
- Summit Lake Trail, 42°59′5″N 109°48′17″W, el. 7,743 feet (2,360 m)
- Surveyor Park Trail, 42°59′5″N 109°44′13″W, el. 9,577 feet (2,919 m)
- Sweeney Creek Trail, 42°58′5″N 109°41′09″W, el. 9,564 feet (2,915 m)
- Sylvan Lake Trail, 42°48′5″N 109°25′21″W, el. 9,833 feet (2,997 m)
- Timico Lake Trail, 42°56′5″N 109°37′10″W, el. 9,721 feet (2,963 m)
- Titcomb Basin Trail, 43°06′5″N 109°37′53″W, el. 10,558 feet (3,218 m)
- Trapper Lake Stock Trail, 43°02′5″N 109°47′41″W, el. 9,055 feet (2,760 m)
- Warm Springs Trail, 43°16′5″N 110°00′46″W, el. 7,992 feet (2,436 m)
- Wheeler Ranch Trail, 42°42′5″N 109°21′48″W, el. 9,255 feet (2,821 m)
- Willow Lake Trail, 43°02′5″N 109°50′45″W, el. 8,799 feet (2,682 m)
- Wyoming Range Trail, 42°41′5″N 110°37′49″W, el. 9,721 feet (2,963 m)

== See also ==
- List of trails in Wyoming
- Emigrant Trail in Wyoming
