= List of trails in Fremont County, Wyoming =

There are at least 69 named trails in Fremont County, Wyoming according to the U.S. Geological Survey, Board of Geographic Names. A trail is defined as: "Route for passage from one point to another; does not include roads or highways (jeep trail, path, ski trail)."

- Absaroka Trail, 43°50′5″N 109°22′15″W, el. 10,787 feet (3,288 m)
- Bear Creek Trail, 43°47′5″N 109°23′09″W, el. 9,350 feet (2,850 m)
- Bears Ears Trail, 42°49′5″N 109°15′03″W, el. 11,696 feet (3,565 m)
- Blue Trail, 42°55′5″N 108°59′05″W, el. 7,779 feet (2,371 m)
- Boundary Trail, 43°39′5″N 109°31′57″W, el. 7,533 feet (2,296 m)
- Burroughs Creek Trail, 43°41′5″N 109°39′00″W, el. 8,602 feet (2,622 m)
- C M Trail, 43°28′5″N 109°39′08″W, el. 7,392 feet (2,253 m)
- Christina Lake Trail, 42°36′5″N 108°54′28″W, el. 9,649 feet (2,941 m)
- Christina Lake Trail, 42°34′5″N 109°01′58″W, el. 8,730 feet (2,660 m)
- Cold Spring Trail, 42°44′5″N 108°53′51″W, el. 8,894 feet (2,711 m)
- Cougar Pass Trail, 43°52′5″N 109°38′07″W, el. 9,340 feet (2,850 m)
- Devils Hole Trail, 43°34′5″N 109°56′19″W, el. 8,878 feet (2,706 m)
- Dinwoody Trail, 43°20′5″N 109°31′12″W, el. 10,059 feet (3,066 m)
- Dry Creek Trail, 43°15′5″N 109°28′44″W, el. 10,239 feet (3,121 m)
- Du Noir Trail, 43°44′5″N 109°51′37″W, el. 8,163 feet (2,488 m)
- DuNoir Trail, 43°46′5″N 109°58′06″W, el. 9,616 feet (2,931 m)
- East Du Noir Trail, 43°47′5″N 109°49′12″W, el. 8,517 feet (2,596 m)
- East Fork Trail, 43°49′5″N 109°19′47″W, el. 10,230 feet (3,120 m)
- Farlow Trail, 42°47′5″N 108°58′05″W, el. 9,685 feet (2,952 m)
- Fish Lake Trail, 43°35′5″N 109°57′56″W, el. 8,920 feet (2,720 m)
- Frontier Creek Trail, 43°50′5″N 109°35′10″W, el. 8,622 feet (2,628 m)
- Gaylord Lake Trail, 42°51′5″N 109°10′21″W, el. 10,210 feet (3,110 m)
- Geyser Creek Trail, 43°32′5″N 109°44′22″W, el. 7,999 feet (2,438 m)
- Glacier Trail, 43°11′5″N 109°37′34″W, el. 10,800 feet (3,300 m)
- High Meadow Trail, 42°47′5″N 109°04′19″W, el. 9,025 feet (2,751 m)
- Ice Lakes Trail, 42°45′5″N 109°05′29″W, el. 9,878 feet (3,011 m)
- Indian Point Trail, 43°44′5″N 109°31′05″W, el. 9,121 feet (2,780 m)
- Indian Trail, 42°38′5″N 108°49′18″W, el. 8,704 feet (2,653 m)
- Ink Wells Trail, 43°17′5″N 109°31′09″W, el. 11,132 feet (3,393 m)
- Jakeys Fork Trail, 43°29′5″N 109°40′05″W, el. 8,924 feet (2,720 m)
- Johnson Trail, 43°26′5″N 108°08′38″W, el. 5,945 feet (1,812 m)
- Kisinger Lakes Trail, 43°43′5″N 109°56′26″W, el. 10,029 feet (3,057 m)
- Lake of the Woods Trail, 43°29′5″N 109°57′13″W, el. 9,508 feet (2,898 m)
- Leeds Creek Trail, 43°30′5″N 109°59′10″W, el. 8,730 feet (2,660 m)
- Little Sweetwater Trail, 42°32′5″N 108°59′34″W, el. 8,461 feet (2,579 m)
- Lizard Head Trail, 42°48′5″N 109°10′58″W, el. 11,863 feet (3,616 m)
- Louis Lake Trail, 42°35′5″N 108°52′11″W, el. 9,331 feet (2,844 m)
- Marston Pass Trail, 43°56′5″N 109°54′00″W, el. 9,918 feet (3,023 m)
- Middle Fork Trail, 42°43′5″N 108°54′15″W, el. 8,140 feet (2,480 m)
- Moon Lake Trail, 43°28′5″N 109°47′14″W, el. 10,062 feet (3,067 m)
- Moss Lake Trail, 42°51′5″N 109°10′54″W, el. 9,987 feet (3,044 m)
- Ninemile Trail, 43°48′5″N 109°21′05″W, el. 10,266 feet (3,129 m)
- Oregon Trail, 42°30′5″N 107°49′08″W, el. 6,306 feet (1,922 m)
- Parque Creek Trail, 43°43′5″N 109°39′14″W, el. 8,783 feet (2,677 m)
- Pelham Lake Trail, 43°41′5″N 109°59′31″W, el. 8,711 feet (2,655 m)
- Petes Lake Trail, 42°44′5″N 108°56′11″W, el. 9,406 feet (2,867 m)
- Pine Creek Trail, 42°30′5″N 108°53′23″W, el. 8,651 feet (2,637 m)
- Pinnacle Trail, 43°44′5″N 109°57′59″W, el. 9,472 feet (2,887 m)
- Pinto Park Trail, 42°44′5″N 109°03′13″W, el. 10,036 feet (3,059 m)
- Ramshorn Trail, 43°41′5″N 109°41′36″W, el. 9,455 feet (2,882 m)
- Ramshorn Trail, 43°45′5″N 109°47′48″W, el. 8,697 feet (2,651 m)
- Ross Lake Trail, 43°27′5″N 109°38′07″W, el. 10,400 feet (3,200 m)
- Sheridan Trail, 43°37′5″N 109°59′04″W, el. 9,055 feet (2,760 m)
- Shoshone Stock Driveway, 42°36′5″N 108°48′37″W, el. 8,281 feet (2,524 m)
- Sioux Pass Trail, 42°33′5″N 108°54′13″W, el. 9,170 feet (2,800 m)
- Smith Lake Trail, 42°48′5″N 109°04′14″W, el. 9,429 feet (2,874 m)
- South Fork Fish Creek Trail, 43°30′5″N 110°02′25″W, el. 8,166 feet (2,489 m)
- Squaw Creek Trail, 42°46′5″N 108°58′21″W, el. 10,312 feet (3,143 m)
- Stough Creek Basin Trail, 42°40′5″N 109°01′17″W, el. 10,082 feet (3,073 m)
- Sweetwater Trail, 42°35′5″N 109°04′17″W, el. 9,071 feet (2,765 m)
- Tepee Creek Trail, 43°44′5″N 109°23′08″W, el. 10,669 feet (3,252 m)
- Twilight Creek Trail, 43°49′5″N 109°39′30″W, el. 10,417 feet (3,175 m)
- Union Pass Trail, 43°30′5″N 109°50′16″W, el. 9,774 feet (2,979 m)
- Washakie Trail, 42°51′5″N 109°10′19″W, el. 10,203 feet (3,110 m)
- Whiskey Mountain Trail, 43°26′5″N 109°39′40″W, el. 9,121 feet (2,780 m)
- Wiggins Fork Trail, 43°48′5″N 109°32′41″W, el. 8,150 feet (2,480 m)
- Wolf Trail, 42°39′5″N 108°48′11″W, el. 7,861 feet (2,396 m)
- Yellow Trail, 43°10′5″N 109°12′49″W, el. 6,854 feet (2,089 m)

== See also ==
- List of trails in Wyoming
