= Morrison Trail =

Hiking trail system in Pennsylvania

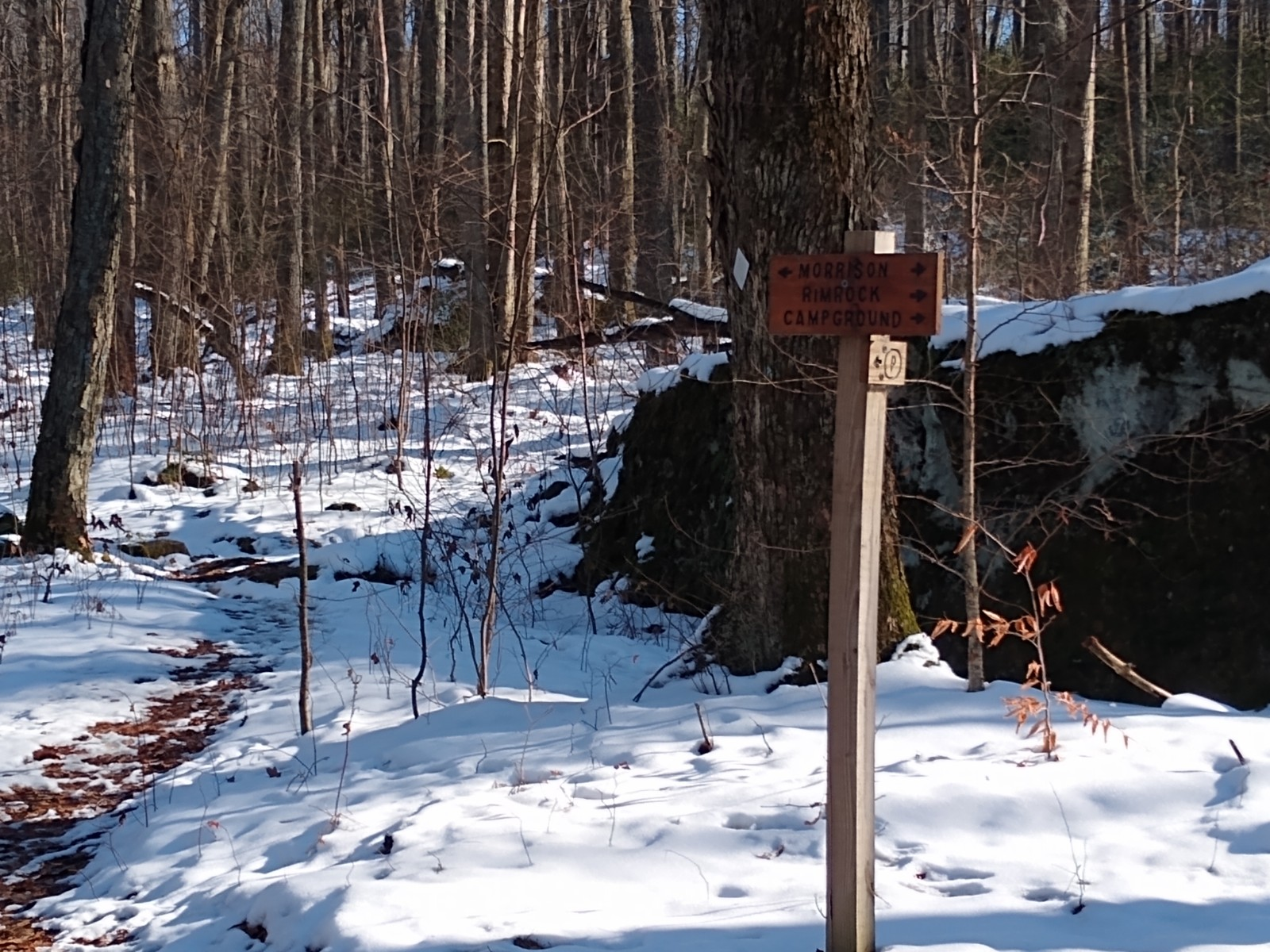
- A junction in the Morrison Trail network
- Length: 12 mi (19 km)
- Location: Warren County and McKean County, Pennsylvania, US
- Trailheads: Pennsylvania Route 59, western McKean County
- Use: Hiking
- Elevation change: Moderate
- Difficulty: Moderate
- Season: Year-round
- Hazards: Uneven and rocky terrain, rattlesnakes, mosquitoes, ticks, black bears

The Morrison Trail is a hiking trail system in Allegheny National Forest in northwestern Pennsylvania, consisting of 12 linear miles (19 km) of trails. The system includes an entrance trail from Pennsylvania Route 59 that leads to a long loop trail, which in turn includes a cross-connector trail, enabling several different loops of various lengths.

== Route ==
=== Main loop ===
The trailhead for the Morrison Trail system is found at a large parking lot off the south side of PA Route 59, in western McKean County, about 3.5 miles east of the bridge over Allegheny Reservoir, and 4.3 miles west of the first junction of PA Route 59 and PA Route 321 at Bradford Ranger Station. The trail system starts in a high plateau area to the east of the reservoir. The entrance trail follows a flat and easy path for 0.5 mile south of the parking lot, to the first junction with the main loop.

This description follows the main loop counter-clockwise, as is common in publications about the Morrison Trail. Turn west from the junction with the entrance trail and continue for 0.2 mile to the first junction with the cross-connector trail, which heads steeply downhill to the south. The main loop continues westbound, first over a high plateau area, but eventually heading steeply downhill toward Allegheny Reservoir. Within sight of the reservoir, the trail turns south, roughly parallel to the shore but high above it, then turns east. The trail passes the organized Morrison Campground, which features a small beach, then turns northeast alongside an inlet and then the incoming Morrison Run. After following that creek upstream for about 1.5 miles, the trail reaches the junction with the southern end of the cross-connector trail near the confluence with an incoming tributary stream. The main loop continues northeast along the main branch of Morrison Run until it reaches the top of the plateau. Here the trail makes a large U-turn back to the west and returns to the junction with the entrance trail. Here the hiker will turn north and repeat the entrance trail back to the trailhead on PA Route 59.

=== Cross-connector trail ===
The northern end of the cross-connector trail is on high ground on top of the plateau. Heading south, the cross-connector descends steeply through a gully that eventually carries a tributary of Morrison Run. The trail follows this stream past many small waterfalls and several large rock formations. The cross-connector ends at another junction with the main loop, to the northeast of Morrison Campground and near the confluence of the two branches of Morrison Run.

== Hiking options ==
To complete the eastern loop of the Morrison Trail, begin by hiking south on the entrance trail for 0.5 mile to the first junction in the system, and then turning right and continuing for 0.2 mile to the next junction. Turn south on the cross-connector trail and follow it for 1.2 miles until it ends at the other side of the main loop. Turn northeast and follow the eastern side of the main loop for 2.9 miles as it eventually turns to the north and then back to the west, back to the junction with the entrance trail. Repeat that trail for 0.5 mile and reach the trailhead again after a total of 5.3 miles.

To complete the western loop of the Morrison Trail, also known as the Rimrock Loop, begin by hiking south on the entrance trail for 0.5 mile to the first junction in the system, and then turning right and continuing for 0.2 mile to the next junction. Turn right, to the west. The trail eventually curves to the south above Allegheny Reservoir then back to the east, and at 6.7 miles from the previous junction it reaches the second junction with the cross-connector trail. Turn north on that trail and follow it uphill for 1.2 miles until it ends at the other side of the main loop. Turn east on the main loop and continue for 0.2 mile to the junction with the entrance trail. Repeat that trail for 0.5 mile and reach the trailhead again after a total of 9.3 miles.

Completing the entire main loop without the cross-connector trail, which in turn requires completing the entrance trail in both directions, results in a hike of 10.8 miles. Completing the entire network as a figure-8, which requires completing both the cross-connector trail and the entrance trail in both directions, results in a hike of 13.2 miles.
