= Clear Creek Trail =

Grand Canyon hiking trail

Coordinates: 36.11081°N 112.09078°W

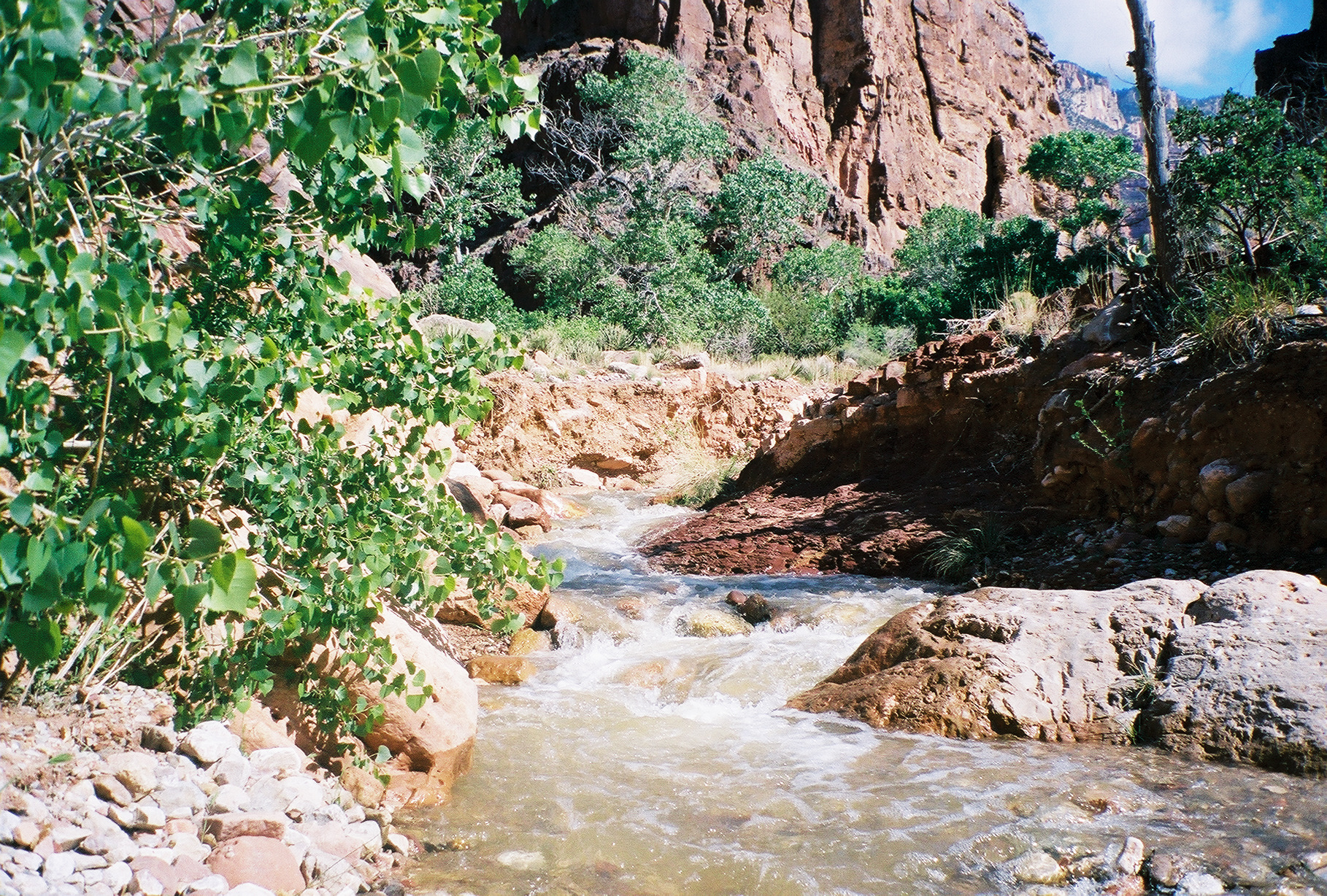
- The Clear Creek Stream in the Grand Canyon
- Length: 8.4 mi (13.5 km)
- Location: Grand Canyon National Park, Arizona, United States
- Trailheads: Clear Creek Trail Junction with North Kaibab Trail; Clear Creek, Grand Canyon
- Use: Hiking; Backpacking
- Elevation change: 1,300 ft (400 m)
- Highest point: Sumner Wash
- Lowest point: Clear Creek Trail Junction
- Difficulty: Intermediate
- Season: Early Spring to Late Fall
- Sights: Grand Canyon; Clear Creek; Phantom Ranch
- Hazards: Severe Weather; Overexertion; Dehydration; Flash Flood

The Clear Creek Trail is a hiking trail below the North Rim, from lower Bright Angel Canyon into lower Clear Creek Canyon of the Grand Canyon National Park, located in the U.S. state of Arizona.

== Description ==
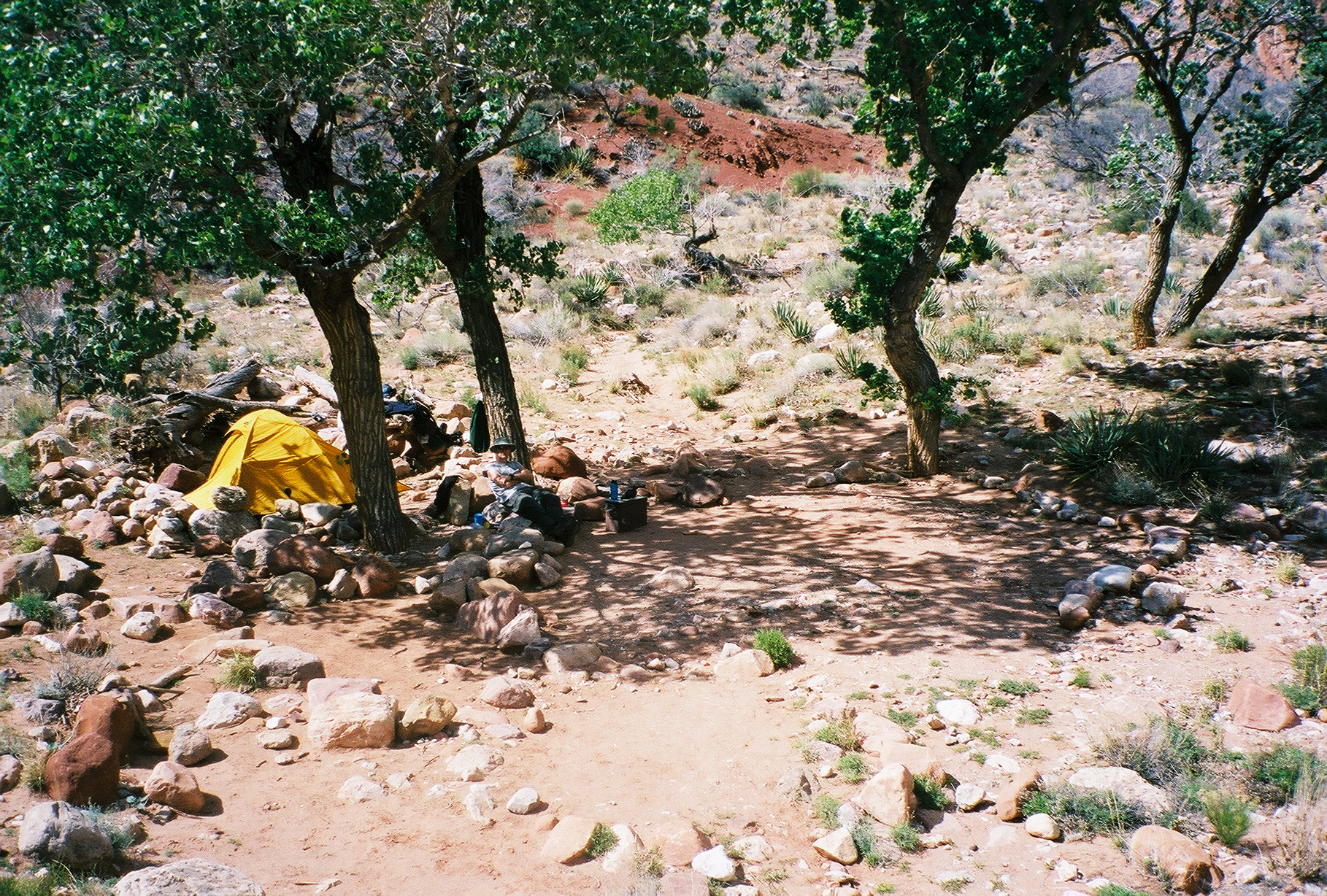
The campgrounds located at the end of the Clear Creek Trail

The trail begins near the Colorado River at the bottom of the Grand Canyon, about 0.5 miles (0.8 km) north of Phantom Ranch at a junction with the North Kaibab Trail. From the trail head, the trail ascends 1,150 feet (350 m) to the Tonto Platform over the first 1.7 miles (2.7 km). Once on the platform, the trail heads east around the south side of Zoroaster Temple, a large butte on the north side of the river that's easily identified from Grand Canyon Village on the south rim. The trail follows contours around the temple for several miles until it reaches the Ottoman Amphitheater, and then descends into the Clear Creek drainage. The Total trail length to Clear Creek is about 8.4 miles (13.5 km).

Camping in the Clear Creek area is "at large" with two exceptions: No camping is allowed between the trail head at the junction with the North Kaibab Trail and Sumner Wash, and in the Clear Creek drainage from its mouth at the Colorado River upstream to the first major side-canyon entering from the east. Most creek beds along the trail are dry. Perennial water is only available at Clear Creek at the eastern terminus of the trail. All water in the Clear Creek area must be filtered, treated, or boiled before consuming.

== History ==
Construction of the trail was a Civilian Conservation Corps project during 1934 and 1935. It was originally used as a mule trail for visitors from Phantom Ranch, but this ended during World War II. Clear Creek Trail is the only trail that traverses the Tonto Platform on the north side of the Colorado River.

== See also ==
- The Grand Canyon
- List of trails in Grand Canyon National Park
