= Exum =

Exum may refer to:

== People ==
- Andrew Exum, American scholar of the Middle East
- Antone Exum, American musician and former American football safety
- Benjamin Exum, member of the North Carolina General Assembly of 1778
- Cecil Exum (1962–2023), American-Australian basketball player
- Culpepper Exum, mayor of Birmingham, Alabama from 1910–1913
- Dante Exum (born 1995), Australian basketball player (son of Cecil)
- Glenn Exum, American mountain climber
- J. Cheryl Exum (1946–2024), biblical scholar
- James G. Exum, American jurist who served on the North Carolina Supreme Court
- Nathaniel Exum, American politician in the Maryland Senate

== Other uses ==
- Exum Glacier, Antarctica
- Exum Ridge, a prominent rock buttress on the Grand Teton in Wyoming
- Exum Mountain Guides, a mountain guide service based in Wyoming

== See also ==
- Exuma (disambiguation)
