= Upper Exum Ridge Route =

Climbing route, Wyoming

- Exum Ridge Route
- Location: Grand Teton National Park, Wyoming, United States
- Coordinates: 43.74110°N 110.802°W
- Climbing area: Grand Teton
- Route type: Trad
- Vertical gain: 4,000 feet
- Pitches: 12
- Technical grade: 5.5
- NCCS grade: II
- First ascent: Glen Exum solo, 1931.

The Upper Exum Ridge Route is the upper section of a technical rock climbing up the Grand Teton's Exum Ridge in Wyoming.

The route and ridge is named after Glenn Exum who pioneered the climb, via a solo ascent, on a day when his mentor Paul Petzoldt was guiding a couple up the original Owen-Spaulding Route. Today the route is split into the Upper and Lower Exum Ridge Routes. It is common for parties to bypass the more technically challenging lower section and climb exclusively the upper section. The Direct Exum Ridge Route which included both sections is recognized in the historic climbing text Fifty Classic Climbs of North America.

In 1931 Exum and Petzoldt started Exum Mountain Guides, which has grown to be a prestigious climbing school and mountain guide service. In 1982 Exum, accompanied by many distinguished mountaineers, made one last climb of the Exum Ridge route on the fiftieth anniversary of his first ascent.
