= Grand Teton National Park =

National park in Wyoming, United States

- IUCN category II (national park)
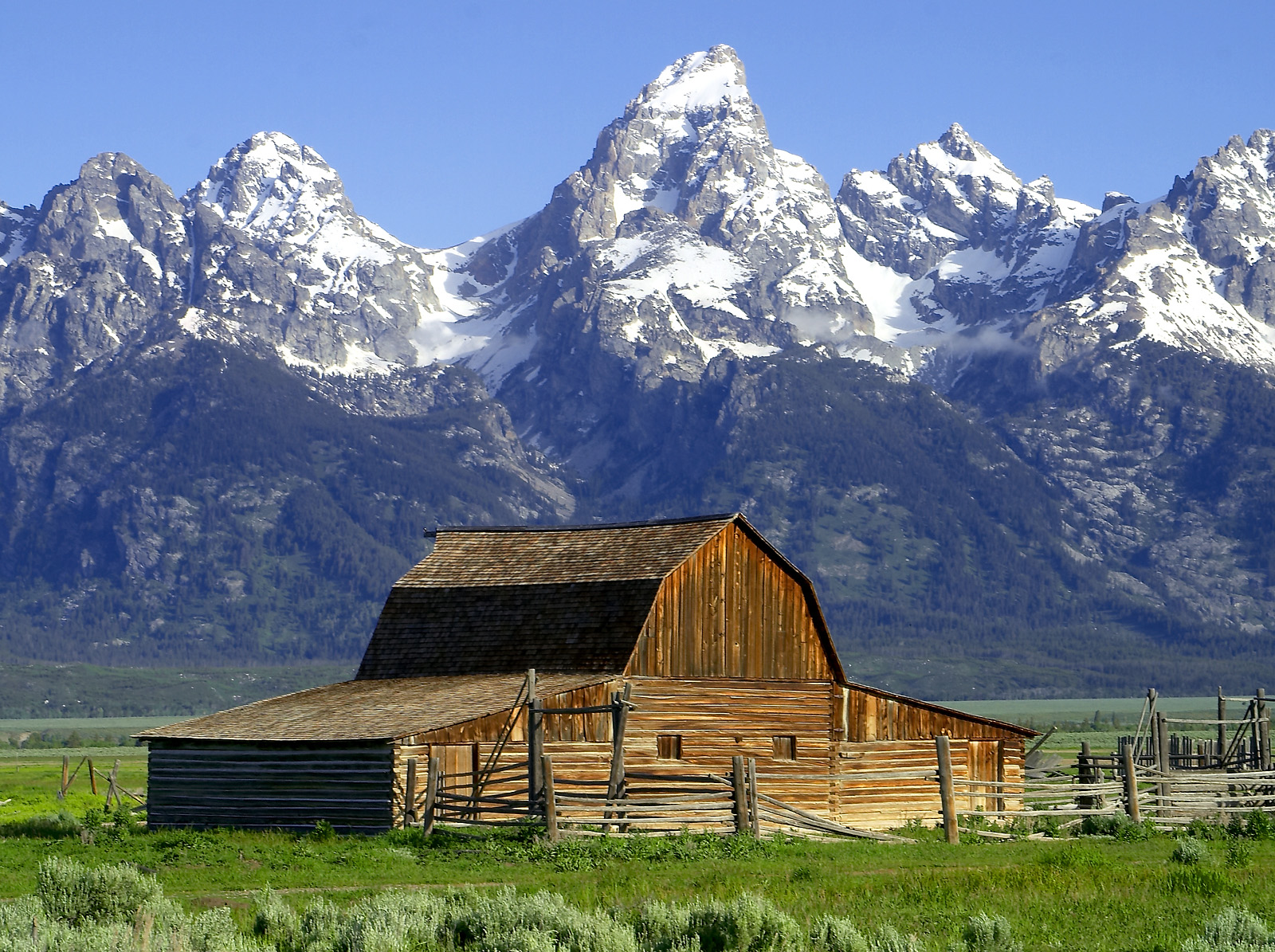
- The John Moulton Barn and the Teton Range

- Location within Wyoming Location within the United States
- Interactive map of Grand Teton National Park
- Location: Teton County, Wyoming, United States
- Nearest city: Jackson
- Coordinates: 43°50′00″N 110°42′03″W
- Area: 310,000 acres (1,300 km^{2})
- Established: February 26, 1929
- Visitors: 3,800,648 (in 2025)
- Governing body: National Park Service
- Website: nps.gov/grte

Grand Teton National Park is a national park of the United States in northwestern Wyoming. At approximately 310,000 acres (1,300 km^{2}; 480 sq mi), the park includes the major peaks of the 40-mile-long (64 km) Teton Range as well as most of the northern sections of the valley known as Jackson Hole. Grand Teton National Park is 10 miles (16 km) south of Yellowstone National Park, to which it is connected by the John D. Rockefeller Jr. Memorial Parkway. Along with surrounding national forests, these three protected areas constitute the almost 22-million-acre (89,000-square-kilometer) Greater Yellowstone Ecosystem, one of the world's largest intact mid-latitude temperate ecosystems.

The human history of the Grand Teton region dates back at least 11,000 years. In the early 19th century, the first European colonizers encountered the eastern Shoshone people. Between 1810 and 1840, the region attracted fur trading companies that vied for control of the lucrative beaver pelt trade. U.S. government expeditions to the region commenced in the mid-19th century, with the first permanent white colonizers arriving in the 1880s.

Efforts to preserve the region as a national park began in the late 19th century, and in 1929 Grand Teton National Park was established, protecting the Teton Range's major peaks. In the 1930s, conservationists led by John D. Rockefeller Jr. began purchasing land in Jackson Hole to be added to the existing national park. Against public opinion and with repeated Congressional efforts to repeal the measures, much of Jackson Hole was set aside for protection as Jackson Hole National Monument in 1943. The monument was abolished in 1950 and most of the monument land was added to Grand Teton National Park.

Grand Teton National Park is named for Grand Teton, the tallest mountain in the Teton Range. At 13,775 feet (4,199 m), Grand Teton rises more than 7,000 feet (2,100 m) above Jackson Hole. The park has numerous lakes, including 15-mile-long (24 km) Jackson Lake as well as streams and the upper main stem of the Snake River. Though in recession, a dozen small glaciers persist at the higher elevations near the highest peaks in the range. Some of the rocks in the park are the oldest found in any American national park and have been dated at nearly 2.7 billion years.

Grand Teton National Park is an almost pristine ecosystem and the same species of flora and fauna that have existed since prehistoric times can still be found there. More than 1,000 species of vascular plants, dozens of species of mammals, 300 species of birds, more than a dozen fish species, and a few species of reptiles and amphibians inhabit the park. Due to changes in the ecosystem, some of them human-induced, efforts have been made to provide enhanced protection to some species of native fish and the increasingly threatened whitebark pine.

Grand Teton National Park is a popular destination for mountaineering, hiking, fishing, and recreation. There are more than 1,000 drive-in campsites and over 200 miles (320 km) of hiking trails that provide access to backcountry camping. Noted for world-renowned trout fishing, the park is one of the few places to catch Snake River fine-spotted cutthroat trout. Grand Teton has several National Park Service–run visitor centers and privately operated concessions for motels, lodges, gas stations, and marinas.

== Human history ==
=== Paleo-Indians and Native Americans ===
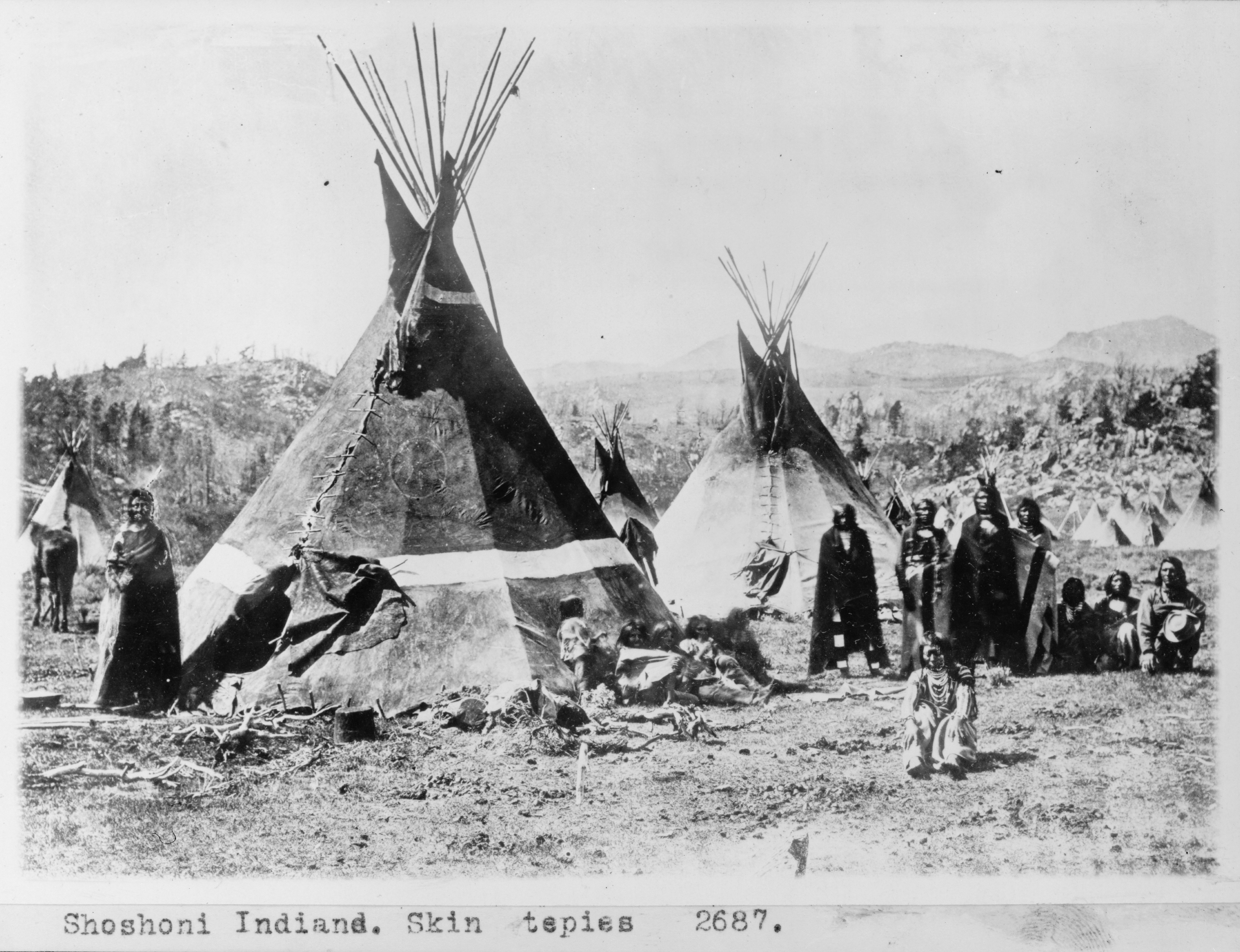
A Shoshone encampment in Wyoming in 1870, photographed by W. H. Jackson

Paleo-Indian presence in what is now Grand Teton National Park dates back more than 11,000 years. Jackson Hole valley climate at that time was colder and more alpine than the semi-arid climate found today, and the first humans were migratory hunter-gatherers spending summer months in Jackson Hole and wintering in the valleys west of the Teton Range. Along the shores of Jackson Lake, fire pits, tools, and what are thought to have been fishing weights have been discovered. One of the tools found is of a type associated with the Clovis culture, and tools from this cultural period date back at least 11,500 years. Some of the tools are made of obsidian which chemical analysis indicates came from sources near present-day Teton Pass, south of Grand Teton National Park. Though obsidian was also available north of Jackson Hole, virtually all the obsidian spear points found are from a source to the south, indicating that the main seasonal migratory route for the Paleo-Indian was from this direction. Elk, which winter on the National Elk Refuge at the southern end of Jackson Hole and northwest into higher altitudes during spring and summer, follow a similar migratory pattern to this day. From 11,000 to about 500 years ago, there is little evidence of change in the migratory patterns amongst the Native American groups in the region and no evidence that indicates any permanent human settlement.

When white American colonists first entered the region in the first decade of the 19th century, they encountered the eastern tribes of the Shoshone people. Most of the Shoshone that lived in the mountain vastness of the greater Yellowstone region continued to be pedestrian while other groups of Shoshone that resided in lower elevations had limited use of horses. The mountain-dwelling Shoshone were known as "Sheep-eaters" or "Tukudika" as they referred to themselves, since a staple of their diet was the Bighorn Sheep. The Shoshones continued to follow the same migratory pattern as their predecessors and have been documented as having a close spiritual relationship with the Teton Range. Several stone enclosures on some of the peaks, including on the upper slopes of Grand Teton (known simply as The Enclosure) are thought to have been used by Shoshone during vision quests. The Teton and Yellowstone region Shoshone were relocated to the Wind River Indian Reservation after it was established in 1868. The reservation is situated 100 mi (160 km) southeast of Jackson Hole on land that was selected by Chief Washakie.

=== Fur trade exploration ===
The Lewis and Clark Expedition (1804–1806) passed well north of the Grand Teton region. During their return trip from the Pacific Ocean, expedition member John Colter was given an early discharge so he could join two fur trappers who were heading west in search of beaver pelts. Colter was later hired by Manuel Lisa to lead fur trappers and explore the region around the Yellowstone River. During the winter of 1807/08, Colter passed through Jackson Hole and was the first Caucasian to see the Teton Range. Lewis and Clark expedition co-leader William Clark produced a map based on the previous expedition and included the explorations of John Colter in 1807, apparently based on discussions between Clark and Colter when the two met in St. Louis, Missouri in 1810. Another map attributed to William Clark indicates John Colter entered Jackson Hole from the northeast, crossing the Continental Divide at either Togwotee Pass or Union Pass and left the region after crossing Teton Pass, following the well established Native American trails. In 1931, the Colter Stone, a rock carved in the shape of a head with the inscription "John Colter" on one side and the year "1808" on the other, was discovered in a field in Tetonia, Idaho, which is west of Teton Pass. The Colter Stone has not been authenticated to have been created by John Colter and may have been the work of later expeditions to the region.

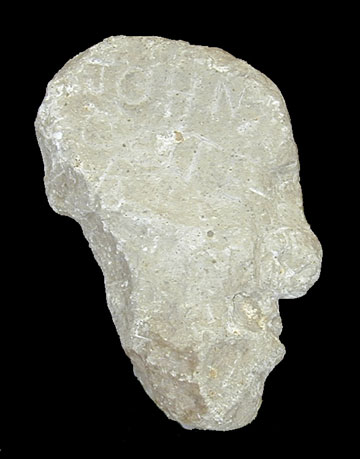
The enigmatic Colter Stone, with the inscription "John Colter", was found in a field in eastern Idaho in 1931.

John Colter is widely considered the first mountain man and, like those that came to the Jackson Hole region over the next 30 years, he was there primarily for the profitable fur trapping; the region was rich with the highly sought after pelts of beaver and other fur-bearing animals. Between 1810 and 1812, the Astorians traveled through Jackson Hole and crossed Teton Pass as they headed east in 1812. After 1810, American and British fur trading companies were in competition for control of the North American fur trade, and American sovereignty over the region was not secured until the signing of the Oregon Treaty in 1846. One party employed by the British North West Company and led by explorer Donald Mackenzie entered Jackson Hole from the west in 1818 or 1819. The Tetons, as well as the valley west of the Teton Range known today as Pierre's Hole, may have been named by French-speaking Iroquois or French Canadian trappers that were part of Mackenzie's party. Earlier parties had referred to the most prominent peaks of the Teton Range as the Pilot Knobs. The French trappers' les trois tétons (the three breasts) was later shortened to the Tetons.

Formed in the mid-1820s, the Rocky Mountain Fur Company partnership included Jedediah Smith, William Sublette, and David Edward Jackson or "Davey Jackson". Jackson oversaw the trapping operations in the Teton region between 1826 and 1830. Sublette named the valley east of the Teton Range "Jackson's Hole" (later simply Jackson Hole) for Davey Jackson. As the demand for beaver fur declined and the various regions of the American West became depleted of beaver due to over trapping, American fur trading companies folded; however, individual mountain men continued to trap beaver in the region until about 1840. From the mid-1840s until 1860, Jackson Hole and the Teton Range were generally devoid of all but the small populations of Native American tribes that had already been there. Most overland human migration routes such as the Oregon and Mormon Trails crossed over South Pass, well to the south of the Teton Range, and Caucasian influence in the Teton region was minimal until the U.S. Government commenced organized explorations.

=== Organized exploration and settlement ===
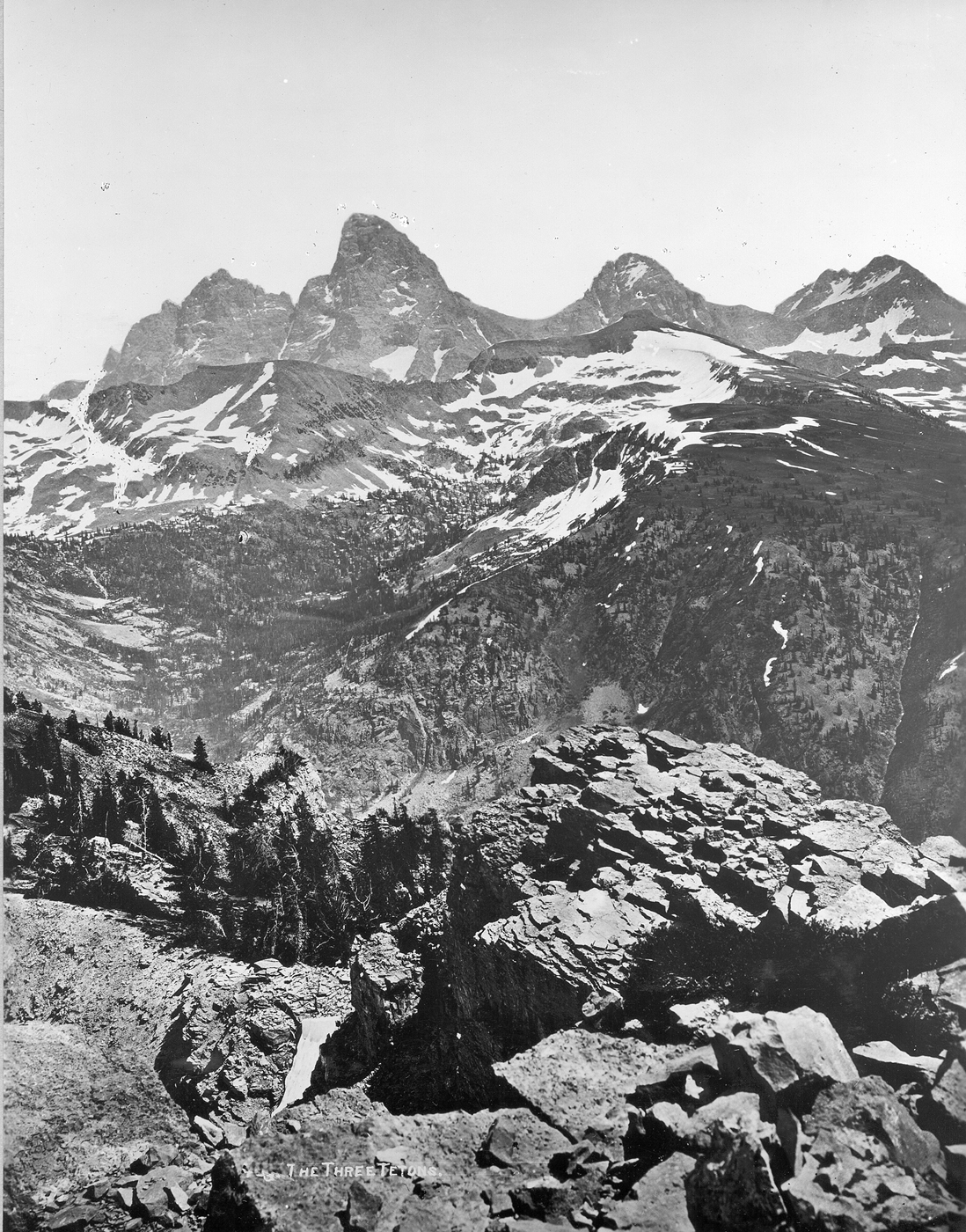
"The Three Tetons" as seen from west of the Teton Range by members of the Hayden Geological Survey of 1872. One of the earliest photographs of the Teton Range taken by William Henry Jackson in 1872.

The first U.S. Government-sponsored expedition to enter Jackson Hole was the 1859–60 Raynolds Expedition. Led by U.S. Army Captain William F. Raynolds and guided by mountain man Jim Bridger, it included naturalist F. V. Hayden, who later led other expeditions to the region. The expedition had been charged with exploring the Yellowstone region, but encountered difficulties crossing mountain passes due to snow. Bridger ended up guiding the expedition south over Union Pass then following the Gros Ventre River drainage to the Snake River and leaving the region over Teton Pass. Organized exploration of the region was halted during the American Civil War but resumed when F. V. Hayden led the well-funded Hayden Geological Survey of 1871. In 1872, Hayden oversaw explorations in Yellowstone, while a branch of his expedition known as the Snake River Division was led by James Stevenson and explored the Teton region. Along with Stevenson was photographer William Henry Jackson who took the first photographs of the Teton Range. The Hayden Geological Survey named many of the mountains and lakes in the region. The explorations by early mountain men and subsequent expeditions failed to identify any sources of economically viable mineral wealth. Nevertheless, small groups of prospectors set up claims and mining operations on several of the creeks and rivers. By 1900 all organized efforts to retrieve minerals had been abandoned. Though the Teton Range was never permanently inhabited, pioneers began settling in the Jackson Hole valley to the east of the range in 1884. These earliest homesteaders were mostly single men who endured long winters, short growing seasons and rocky soils that were hard to cultivate. The region was most suited for the cultivation of hay and cattle ranching. By 1890, Jackson Hole had an estimated permanent population of 60. Menor's Ferry was built in 1892 near present-day Moose, Wyoming to provide access for wagons to the west side of the Snake River. Ranching increased significantly from 1900 to 1920, but a series of agricultural related economic downturns in the early 1920s left many ranchers destitute. Beginning in the 1920s, the automobile provided faster and easier access to areas of natural beauty and old military roads into Jackson Hole over Teton and Togwotee Passes were improved to accommodate the increased vehicle traffic. In response to the increased tourism, dude ranches were established, some new and some from existing cattle ranches, so urbanized travelers could experience the life of a cowboy.

=== Establishment of the park ===
Grand Teton National Park
- Long title: An Act To establish the Grand Teton National Park in the State of Wyoming, and for other purposes.
- Enacted by: the 70th United States Congress
- Effective: February 26, 1929

Citations
- Public law: Pub. L. 70–817
- Statutes at Large: 45 Stat. 1314

Legislative history
- Introduced in the Senate as S. 5543 by John B. Kendrick (D–WY) on January 24, 1929; Committee consideration by Senate Public Lands and Surveys and House Public Lands; Passed the Senate on February 7, 1929; Passed the House on February 18, 1929 (unanimous consent) with amendment; Senate agreed to House amendment on February 20, 1929 (unanimous consent); Signed into law by President Calvin Coolidge on February 26, 1929

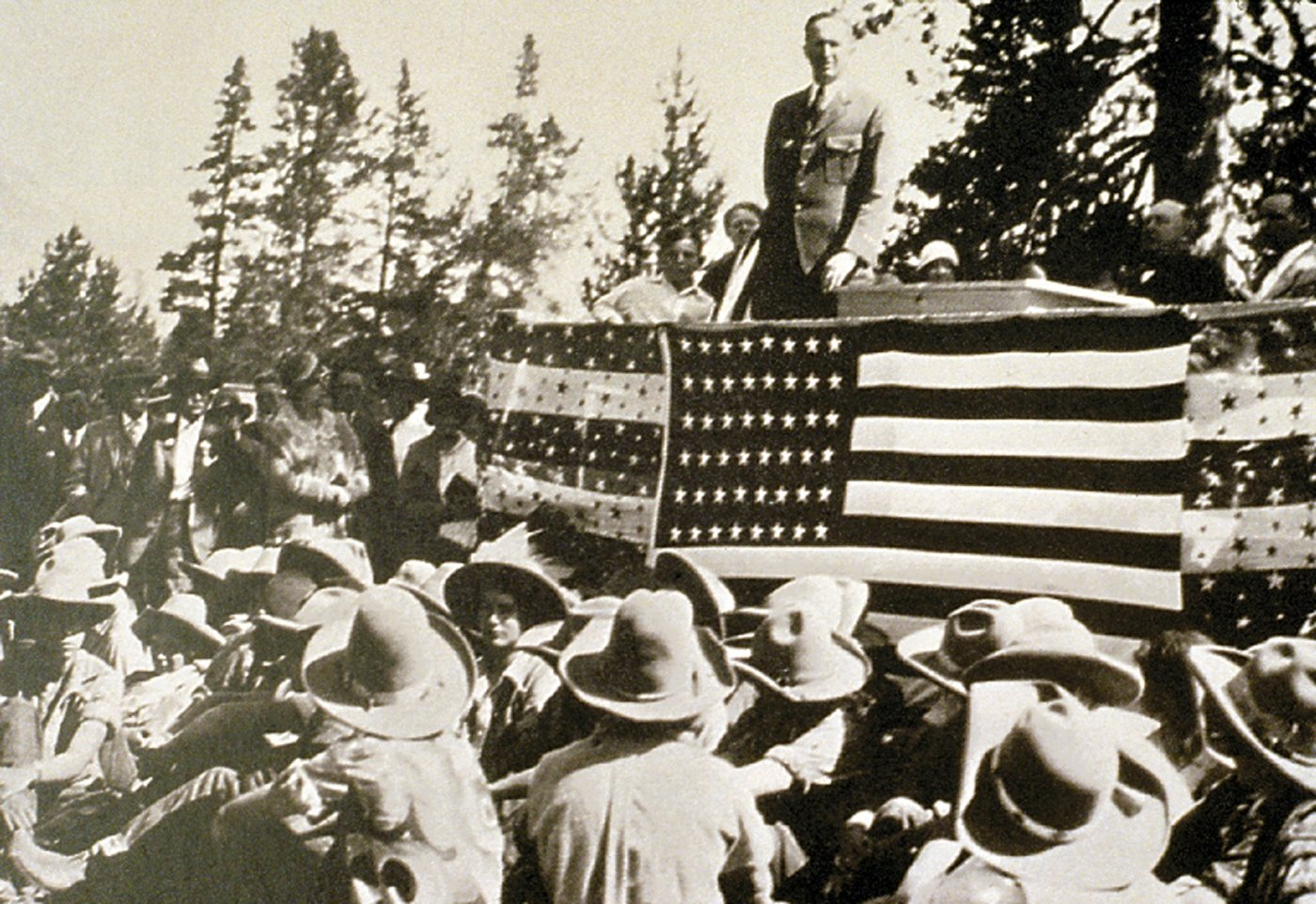
Grand Teton National Park Dedication in 1929

To the north of Jackson Hole, Yellowstone National Park had been established in 1872, and by the close of the 19th century, conservationists wanted to expand the boundaries of that park to include at least the Teton Range. By 1907, in an effort to regulate water flow for irrigation purposes, the United States Bureau of Reclamation had constructed a log crib dam at the Snake River outlet of Jackson Lake. This dam failed in 1910 and a new concrete Jackson Lake Dam replaced it by 1911. The dam was further enlarged in 1916, raising lake waters 39 ft (12 m) as part of the Minidoka Project, designed to provide irrigation for agriculture in the state of Idaho. Further dam construction plans for other lakes in the Teton Range alarmed Yellowstone National Park superintendent Horace Albright, who sought to block such efforts. Jackson Hole residents were opposed to an expansion of Yellowstone, but were more in favor of the establishment of a separate national park which would include the Teton Range and six lakes at the base of the mountains. After congressional approval, President Calvin Coolidge signed the executive order establishing the 96,000-acre (39,000 ha) Grand Teton National Park on February 26, 1929.

The valley of Jackson Hole remained primarily in private ownership when John D. Rockefeller Jr. and his wife visited the region in the late 1920s. Horace Albright and Rockefeller discussed ways to preserve Jackson Hole from commercial exploitation, and in consequence, Rockefeller started buying Jackson Hole properties through the Snake River Land Company to later turn them over to the National Park Service. In 1930, this plan was revealed to the residents of the region and was met with strong disapproval. Congressional efforts to prevent the expansion of Grand Teton National Park ended up putting the Snake River Land Company's holdings in limbo. By 1942 Rockefeller had become increasingly impatient that his purchased property might never be added to the park, and wrote to the Secretary of the Interior Harold L. Ickes that he was considering selling the land to another party. Secretary Ickes recommended to President Franklin Roosevelt that the Antiquities Act, which permitted presidents to set aside land for protection without the approval of Congress, be used to establish a national monument in Jackson Hole. Roosevelt created the 221,000-acre (89,000 ha) Jackson Hole National Monument in 1943, using the land donated from the Snake River Land Company and adding additional property from Teton National Forest. The monument and park were adjacent to each other and both were administered by the National Park Service, but the monument designation ensured no funding allotment, nor provided a level of resource protection equal to the park. Members of Congress repeatedly attempted to have the new national monument abolished.

After the end of World War II, national public sentiment was in favor of adding the monument to the park, and though there was still much local opposition, the monument and park were combined in 1950. In recognition of John D. Rockefeller Jr.'s efforts to establish and then expand Grand Teton National Park, a 24,000-acre (9,700 ha) parcel of land between Grand Teton and Yellowstone National Parks was added to the National Park Service in 1972. This land and the road from the southern boundary of the park to West Thumb in Yellowstone National Park was named the John D. Rockefeller Jr. Memorial Parkway. The Rockefeller family owned the JY Ranch, which bordered Grand Teton National Park to the southwest. In November 2007, the Rockefeller family transferred ownership of the ranch to the park for the establishment of the Laurance S. Rockefeller Preserve, which was dedicated on June 21, 2008.

=== History of mountaineering ===
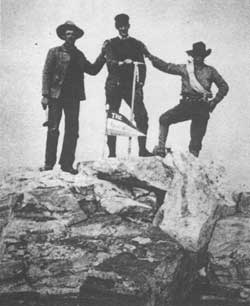
In this image taken by William O. Owen in 1898, his climbing partners John Shive, Franklin Spalding, and Frank Petersen are depicted on top of Grand Teton.

During the last 25 years of the 19th century, the mountains of the Teton Range became a focal point for explorers wanting to claim the first ascents of the peaks. However, white explorers may not have been the first to climb many of the peaks and the earliest first ascent of even the formidable Grand Teton itself might have been achieved long before written history documented it. Native American relics remain including The Enclosure, a human-made structure that is located about 530 ft (160 m) below the summit of Grand Teton at a point near the Upper Saddle (13,160 ft (4,010 m)). Nathaniel P. Langford and James Stevenson, both members of the Hayden Geological Survey of 1872, found The Enclosure during their early attempt to summit Grand Teton. Langford claimed that he and Stevenson climbed Grand Teton, but were vague as to whether they had made it to the summit. Their reported obstacles and sightings were never corroborated by later parties. Langford and Stevenson likely did not get much further than The Enclosure. The first ascent of Grand Teton that is substantiated was made by William O. Owen, Frank Petersen, John Shive and Franklin Spencer Spalding on August 11, 1898. Owen had made two previous attempts on the peak and after publishing several accounts of this first ascent, discredited any claim that Langford and Stevenson had ever reached beyond The Enclosure in 1872. The disagreement over which party first reached the top of Grand Teton may be the greatest controversy in the history of American mountaineering. After 1898 no other ascents of Grand Teton were recorded until 1923.

By the mid-1930s, more than a dozen different climbing routes had been established on Grand Teton including the northeast ridge in 1931 by Glenn Exum. Glenn Exum teamed up with another noted climber named Paul Petzoldt to found the Exum Mountain Guides in 1931. Of the other major peaks on the Teton Range, all were climbed by the late 1930s including Mount Moran in 1922 and Mount Owen in 1930 by Fritiof Fryxell and others after numerous previous attempts had failed. Both Middle and South Teton were first climbed on the same day, August 29, 1923, by a group of climbers led by Albert R. Ellingwood. New routes on the peaks were explored as safety equipment and skills improved and eventually climbs rated at above 5.9 on the Yosemite Decimal System difficulty scale were established on Grand Teton. The classic climb following the route first pioneered by Owen, known as the Owen-Spalding route, is rated at 5.4 due to a combination of concerns beyond the gradient alone. Rock climbing and bouldering had become popular in the park by the mid 20th century. In the late 1950s, gymnast John Gill came to the park and started climbing large boulders near Jenny Lake. Gill approached climbing from a gymnastics perspective and while in the Tetons became the first known climber in history to use gymnastic chalk to improve handholds and to keep hands dry while climbing. During the latter decades of the 20th century, extremely difficult cliffs were explored including some in Death Canyon, and by the mid-1990s, 800 different climbing routes had been documented for the various peaks and canyon cliffs.

== Park management ==
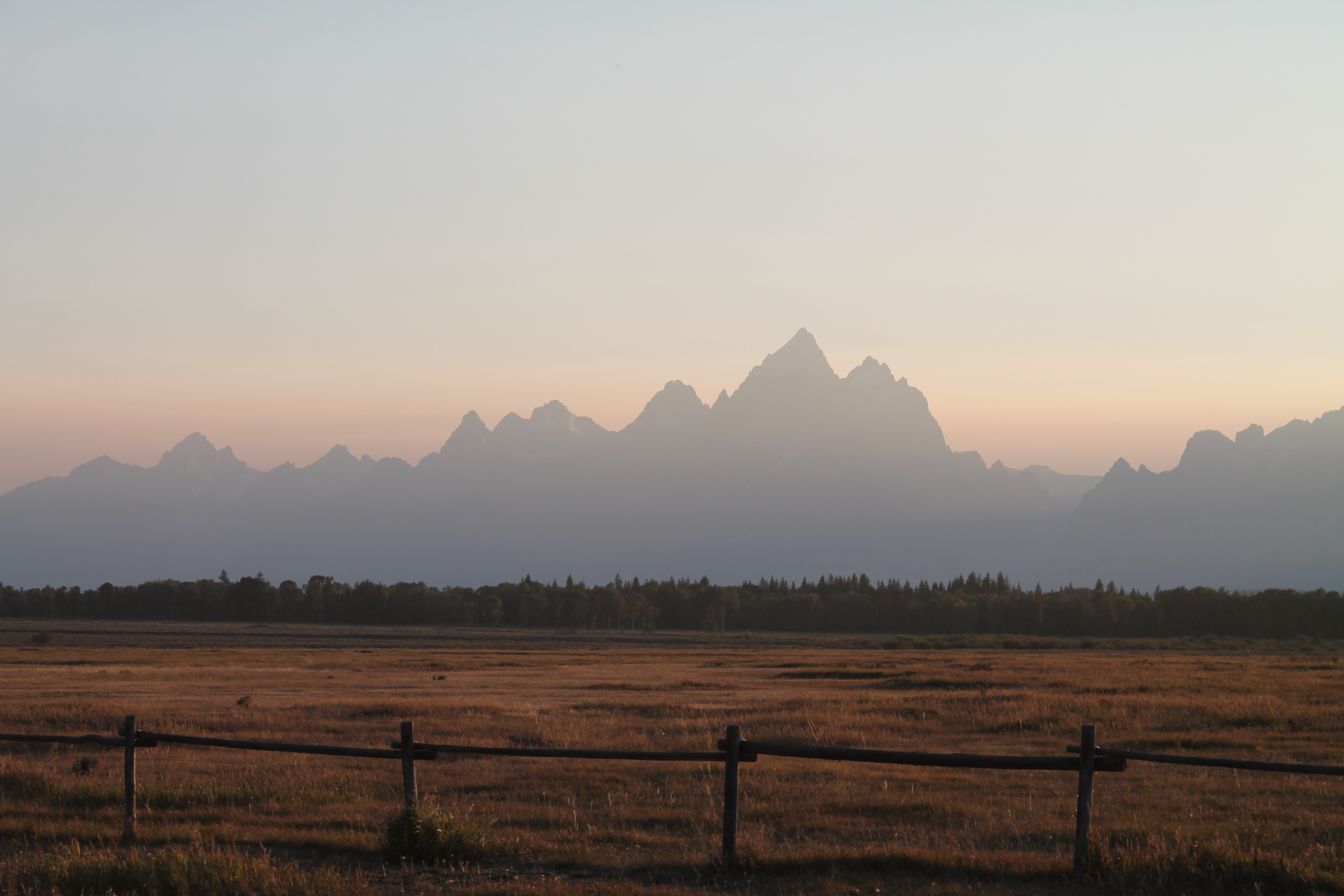
Sunset over the Tetons

Grand Teton National Park is one of the ten most visited national parks in the U.S., with an annual average of 2.75 million visitors in the period from 2007 to 2016, with 3.27 million visiting in 2016. The National Park Service is a federal agency of the United States Department of the Interior and manages both Grand Teton National Park and the John D. Rockefeller Jr. Memorial Parkway. Grand Teton National Park has an average of 100 permanent and 180 seasonal employees. The park also manages 27 concession contracts that provide services such as lodging, restaurants, mountaineering guides, dude ranching, fishing and a boat shuttle on Jenny Lake. The National Park Service works closely with other federal agencies such as the U.S. Forest Service, the U.S. Fish and Wildlife Service, the Bureau of Reclamation, and also, in consequence of Jackson Hole Airport's presence in the park, the Federal Aviation Administration. Initial construction of the airstrip north of the town of Jackson was completed in the 1930s. When Jackson Hole National Monument was designated, the airport was inside it. After the monument and park were combined, the Jackson Hole Airport became the only commercial airport within an American national park. Jackson Hole Airport has some of the strictest noise abatement regulations of any airport in the U.S. The airport has night flight curfews and overflight restrictions, with pilots being expected to approach and depart the airport along the east, south or southwest flight corridors.

=== Expansion ===
As of 2010, 110 privately owned property inholdings, many belonging to the state of Wyoming, are located within Grand Teton National Park. Efforts to purchase or trade these inholdings for other federal lands are ongoing and through partnerships with other entities, $10 million is hoped to be raised to acquire private inholdings by 2016.

In December 2016 the Antelope Flats Parcel consisting of 640 acres (260 ha) (owned by the State of Wyoming as part of state school trust lands) was purchased and transferred to Grand Teton National Park. The purchase price amounted to $46 million ($23 million allocated from the Land and Water Conservation Fund and the last $23 million was raised in private funds from 5,421 donors). Moulton Ranch Cabins, a one-acre (0.40 ha) inholding along the historic Mormon Row was sold to the Grand Teton National Park Foundation in 2018.

In 2020 the National Park Service in partnership with the Conservation Fund acquired a 35-acre (14 ha) parcel located within Grand Teton National Park. This parcel is located near the Granite Canyon Entrance Station.

The 640-acre Kelly Parcel (260 ha) was offered by the state of Wyoming in order to fund schools. Located on a migration route for pronghorn, mule deer, elk and other species, the parcel is at the mouth of the Gros Ventre River Valley. The National Park Service could only acquire the land at its appraised value, leaving charitable organizations to cover the higher sale price demanded by Wyoming legislators. The Wyoming Board of Land Commissioners approved the sale which was completed at the end of 2024.

In 2026, a 210-acre (85 ha) addition was finalized, with the assistance of The Conservation Fund and with funding from the Great American Outdoors Act of 2020. The land sits near the Moose-Wilson Road park entrance.

== Geography ==
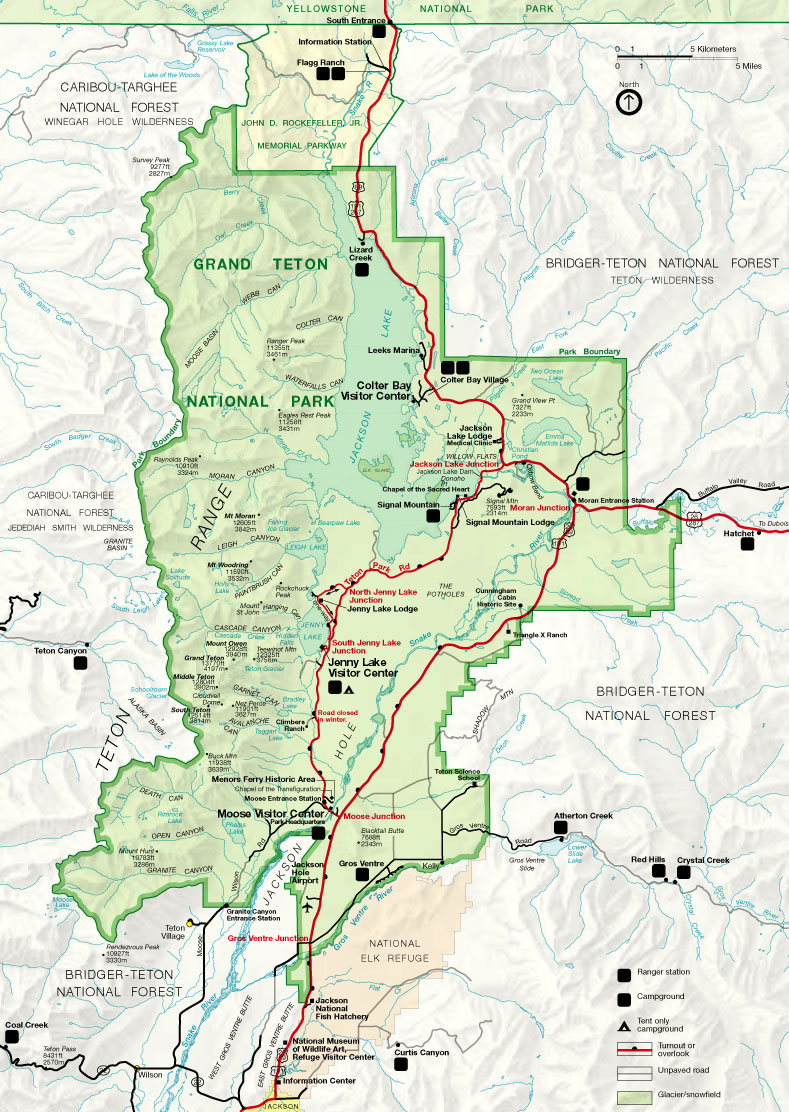
Map of Grand Teton National Park Also see resolution adjustable pdf map

Grand Teton National Park is located in the northwestern region of the U.S. state of Wyoming. To the north the park is bordered by the John D. Rockefeller Jr. Memorial Parkway, which is administered by Grand Teton National Park. The scenic highway with the same name passes from the southern boundary of Grand Teton National Park to West Thumb in Yellowstone National Park. Grand Teton National Park covers approximately 310,000 acres (1,300 km^{2}; 480 sq mi), while the John D. Rockefeller Jr. Memorial Parkway includes 23,700 acres (96 km^{2}; 37.0 sq mi). Most of the Jackson Hole valley and virtually all the major mountain peaks of the Teton Range are within the park. The Jedediah Smith Wilderness of Caribou-Targhee National Forest lies along the western boundary and includes the western slopes of the Teton Range. To the northeast and east lie the Teton Wilderness and Gros Ventre Wilderness of Bridger-Teton National Forest. The National Elk Refuge is to the southeast, and migrating herds of elk winter there. Privately owned land borders the park to the south and southwest. Grand Teton National Park, along with Yellowstone National Park, surrounding National Forests and related protected areas constitute the 18-million-acre (73,000-square-kilometer) Greater Yellowstone Ecosystem. The Greater Yellowstone Ecosystem spans portions of three states and is one of the largest intact mid-latitude ecosystems remaining on Earth. By road, Grand Teton National Park is 290 mi (470 km) from Salt Lake City, Utah and 550 mi (890 km) from Denver, Colorado.

=== Teton Range ===
The youngest mountain range in the Rocky Mountains, the Teton Range began forming between 6 and 9 million years ago. It runs roughly north to south and rises from the floor of Jackson Hole without any foothills along a 40-mile-long (64 km) by 7 to 9 miles (11 to 14 km) wide active fault-block mountain front. The range tilts westward, rising abruptly above Jackson Hole valley which lies to the east but more gradually into Teton Valley to the west. A series of earthquakes along the Teton Fault slowly displaced the western side of the fault upward and the eastern side of the fault downward at an average of 1 foot (30 cm) of displacement every 300–400 years. Most of the displacement of the fault occurred in the last 2 million years. While the fault has experienced up to 7.5-earthquake magnitude events since it formed, it has been relatively quiescent during historical periods, with only a few 5.0-magnitude or greater earthquakes known to have occurred since 1850.

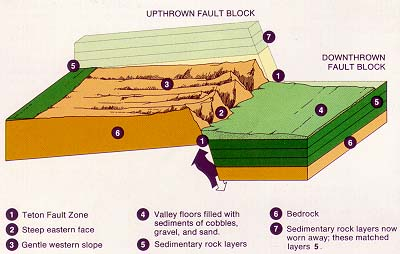
Fault-block mountain formation of the Teton Range and Jackson Hole

In addition to 13,775-foot-high (4,199 m) Grand Teton, another nine peaks are over 12,000 ft (3,700 m) above sea level. Eight of these peaks between Avalanche and Cascade Canyons make up the often-photographed Cathedral Group. The most prominent peak north of Cascade Canyon is the monolithic Mount Moran (12,605 ft (3,842 m)) which rises 5,728 ft (1,746 m) above Jackson Lake. To the north of Mount Moran, the range eventually merges into the high altitude Yellowstone Plateau. South of the central Cathedral Group the Teton Range tapers off near Teton Pass and blends into the Snake River Range.

West to east trending canyons provides easier access by foot into the heart of the range as no vehicular roads traverse the range except at Teton Pass, which is south of the park. Carved by a combination of glacier activity as well as numerous streams, the canyons are at their lowest point along the eastern margin of the range at Jackson Hole. Flowing from higher to lower elevations, the glaciers created more than a dozen U-shaped valleys throughout the range. Cascade Canyon is sandwiched between Mount Owen and Teewinot Mountain to the south and Symmetry Spire to the north and is situated immediately west of Jenny Lake. North to south, Webb, Moran, Paintbrush, Cascade, Death and Granite Canyons slice through Teton Range.

=== Jackson Hole ===
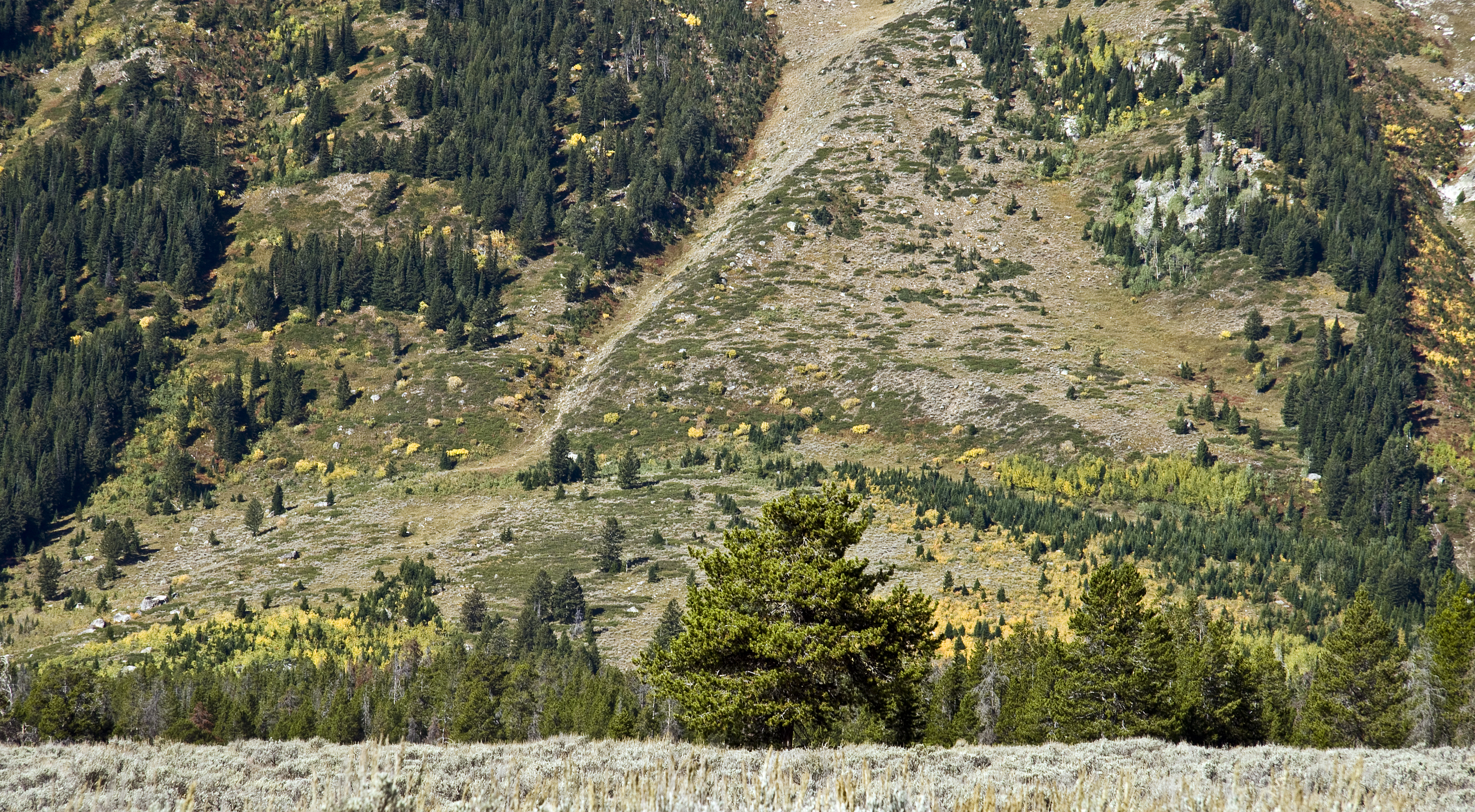
The Teton Fault near the base of Rockchuck Peak creates a nearly horizontal line above the trees in the foreground.

Jackson Hole is a 55-mile-long (89 km) by 6 to 13 miles (9.7 to 20.9 km) wide graben valley with an average elevation of 6,800 ft (2,100 m), its lowest point is near the southern park boundary at 6,350 ft (1,940 m). The valley sits east of the Teton Range and is vertically displaced downward 30,000 ft (9,100 m), making the Teton Fault and its parallel twin on the east side of the valley normal faults with the Jackson Hole block being the hanging wall and the Teton Mountain block being the footwall. Grand Teton National Park contains the major part of both blocks. Erosion of the range provided sediment in the valley so the topographic relief is only 7,700 ft (2,300 m). Jackson Hole is comparatively flat, with only a modest increase in altitude south to north; however, a few isolated buttes such as Blacktail Butte and hills including Signal Mountain dot the valley floor. In addition to a few outcroppings, the Snake River has eroded terraces into Jackson Hole. Southeast of Jackson Lake, glacial depressions known as kettles are numerous. The kettles were formed when ice situated under gravel outwash from ice sheets melted as the glaciers retreated.

=== Lakes and rivers ===
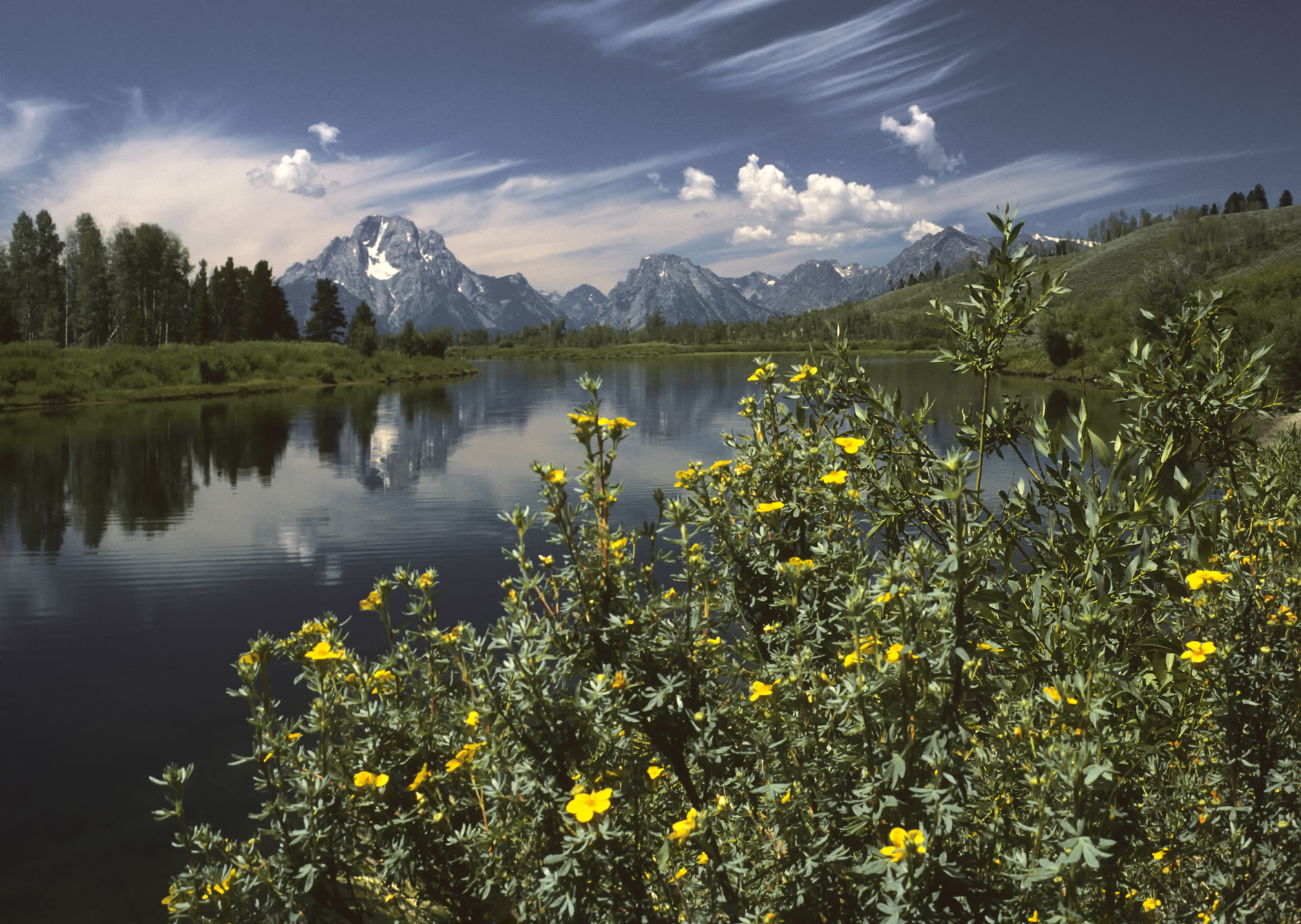
Oxbow Bend on the Snake River

Most of the lakes in the park were formed by glaciers and the largest of these lakes are located at the base of the Teton Range. In the northern section of the park lies Jackson Lake, the largest lake in the park at 15 mi (24 km) in length, 5 mi (8.0 km) wide and 438 ft (134 m) deep. Though Jackson Lake is natural, the Jackson Lake Dam was constructed at its outlet before the creation of the park, and the lake level was raised almost 40 ft (12 m) consequently. East of the Jackson Lake Lodge lies Emma Matilda and Two Ocean Lakes. South of Jackson Lake, Leigh, Jenny, Bradley, Taggart and Phelps Lakes rest at the outlets of the canyons which lead into the Teton Range. Within the Teton Range, small alpine lakes in cirques are common, and there are more than 100 scattered throughout the high country. Lake Solitude, located at an elevation of 9,035 ft (2,754 m), is in a cirque at the head of the North Fork of Cascade Canyon. Other high-altitude lakes can be found at over 10,000 ft (3,000 m) in elevation and a few, such as Icefloe Lake, remain ice-clogged for much of the year. The park is not noted for large waterfalls; however, 100-foot-high (30 m) Hidden Falls just west of Jenny Lake is easy to reach after a short hike.

From its headwaters on Two Ocean Plateau in Yellowstone National Park, the Snake River flows north to south through the park, entering Jackson Lake near the boundary of Grand Teton National Park and John D. Rockefeller Jr. Memorial Parkway. The Snake River then flows through the spillways of the Jackson Lake Dam and from there southward through Jackson Hole, exiting the park just west of the Jackson Hole Airport. The largest lakes in the park all drain either directly or by tributary streams into the Snake River. Major tributaries which flow into the Snake River include Pacific Creek and Buffalo Fork near Moran and the Gros Ventre River at the southern border of the park. Through the comparatively level Jackson Hole valley, the Snake River descends an average of 19 feet per mile (3.6 m/km), while other streams descending from the mountains to the east and west have higher gradients due to increased slope. The Snake River creates braids and channels in sections where the gradients are lower and in steeper sections, erodes and undercuts the cobblestone terraces once deposited by glaciers.

=== Glaciation ===
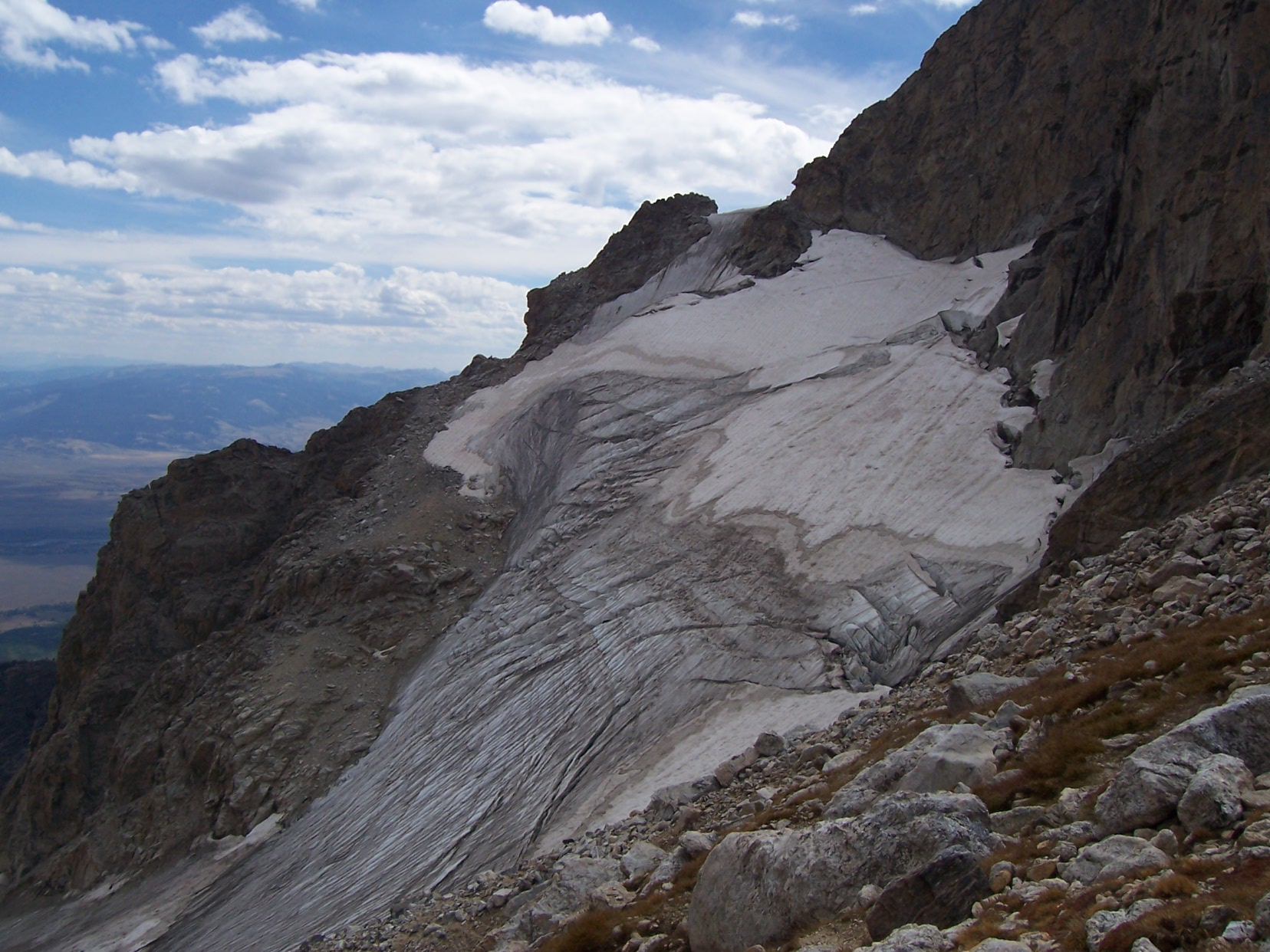
Middle Teton Glacier on the northeast slopes of Middle Teton has numerous crevasses.

The major peaks of the Teton Range were carved into their current shapes by long-vanished glaciers. Commencing 250,000–150,000 years ago, the Tetons went through several periods of glaciation with some areas of Jackson Hole covered by glaciers 2,000 ft (610 m) thick. This heavy glaciation is unrelated to the uplift of the range itself and is instead part of a period of global cooling known as the Quaternary glaciation. Beginning with the Buffalo Glaciation and followed by the Bull Lake and then the Pinedale glaciation, which ended roughly 15,000 years ago, the landscape was greatly impacted by glacial activity. During the Pinedale glaciation, the landscape visible today was created as glaciers from the Yellowstone Plateau flowed south and formed Jackson Lake, while smaller glaciers descending from the Teton Range pushed rock moraines out from the canyons and left behind lakes near the base of the mountains. The peaks themselves were carved into horns and arêtes and the canyons were transformed from water-eroded V-shapes to glacier-carved U-shaped valleys. Approximately a dozen glaciers currently exist in the park, but they are not ancient as they were all reestablished sometime between 1400 and 1850 AD during the Little Ice Age. Of these more recent glaciers, the largest is Teton Glacier, which sits below the northeast face of Grand Teton. Teton Glacier is 3,500 ft (1,100 m) long and 1,100 ft (340 m) wide, and nearly surrounded by the tallest summits in the range. Teton Glacier is also the best-studied glacier in the range, and researchers concluded in 2005 that the glacier could disappear in 30 to 75 years. West of the Cathedral Group near Hurricane Pass, Schoolroom Glacier is tiny but has well-defined terminal and lateral moraines, a small proglacial lake, and other typical glacier features near each other.

== Geology ==
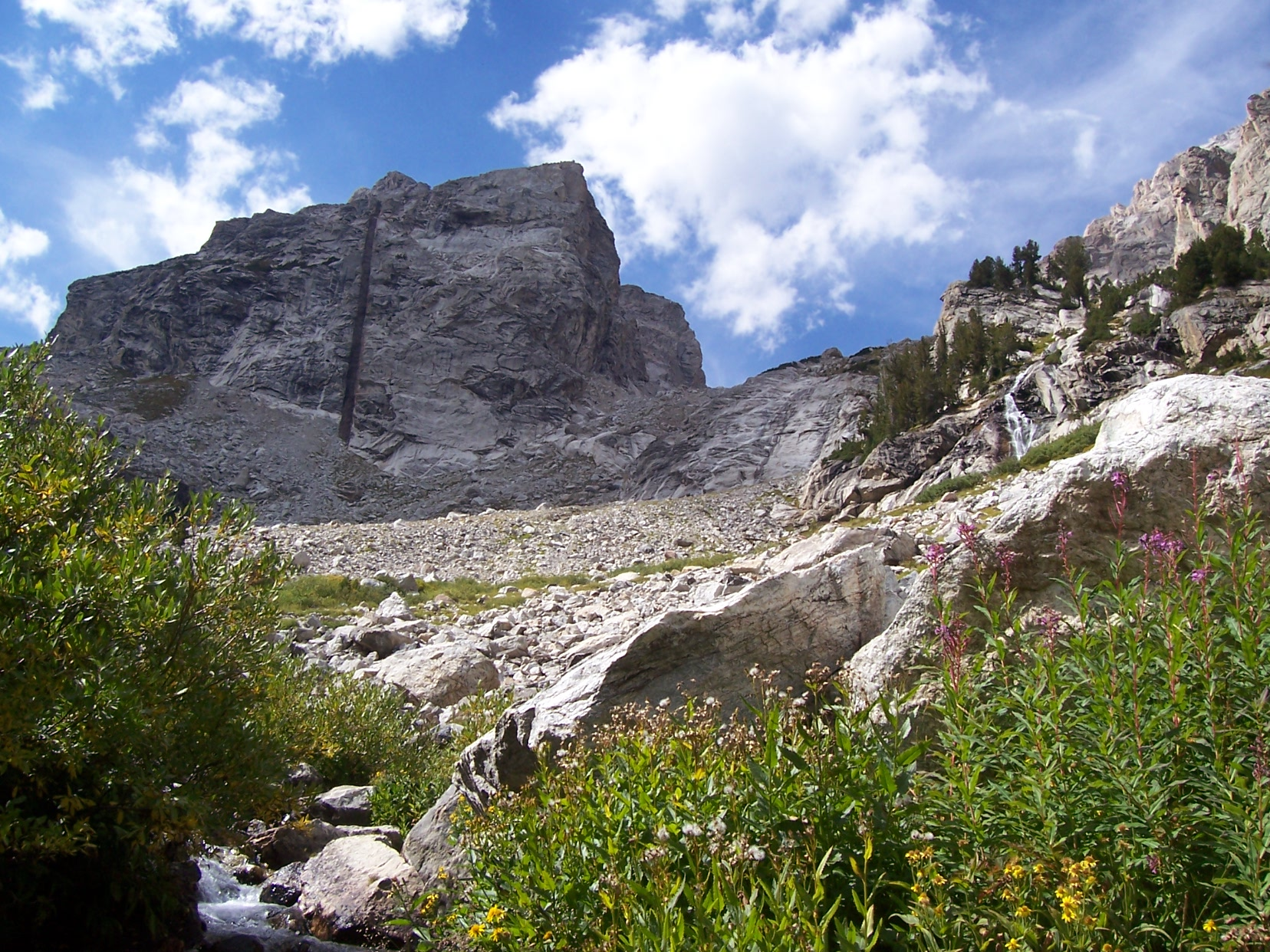
The geologic feature known as the Black Dike is a diabase intrusion into older gneiss and is visible on the east face of Middle Teton as a dark line bisecting the peak.

Grand Teton National Park has some of the most ancient rocks found in any American national park. The oldest rocks dated so far are 2,680 ± 12 million years old, though even older rocks are believed to exist in the park. Formed during the Archean Eon (4 to 2.5 billion years ago), these metamorphic rocks include gneiss, schist and amphibolites. Metamorphic rocks are the most common types found in the northern and southern sections of the Teton Range. 2,545 million years ago, the metamorphic rocks were intruded by igneous granitic rocks, which are now visible in the central Tetons including Grand Teton and the nearby peaks. The light-colored granites of the central Teton Range contrast with the darker metamorphic gneiss found on the flanks of Mount Moran to the north. Magmatic intrusions of diabase rocks 765 million years ago left dikes that can be seen on the east face of Mount Moran and Middle Teton. Granitic and pegmatite intrusions also worked their way into fissures in the older gneiss. Precambrian rocks in Jackson Hole are buried deep under comparatively recent Tertiary volcanic and sedimentary deposits, as well as Pleistocene glacial deposits.

By the close of the Precambrian, the region was intermittently submerged under shallow seas, and for 500 million years various types of sedimentary rocks were formed. During the Paleozoic (542 to 251 million years ago) sandstone, shale, limestone and dolomite were deposited. Though most of these sedimentary rocks have since eroded away from the central Teton Range, they are still evident on the northern, southern and western flanks of the range. One notable exception is the sandstone Flathead Formation which continues to cap Mount Moran. Sedimentary layering of rocks in Alaska Basin, which is on the western border of Grand Teton National Park, chronicles a 120-million-year period of sedimentary deposition. Fossils found in the sedimentary rocks in the park include algae, brachiopods and trilobites. Sedimentary deposition continued during the Mesozoic (250–66 million years ago) and the coal seams found in the sedimentary rock strata indicate the region was densely forested during that era. Numerous coal seams of 5 to 10 ft (1.5 to 3.0 m) in thickness are interspersed with siltstone, claystone and other sedimentary rocks. During the late Cretaceous, a volcanic arc west of the region deposited fine-grained ash that later formed into bentonite, an important mineral resource.

From the end of the Mesozoic to the present, the region went through a series of uplifts and erosional sequences. Commencing 66 million years ago the Laramide orogeny was a period of mountain-building and erosion in western North America that created the ancestral Rocky Mountains. This cycle of uplift and erosion left behind one of the most complete non-marine Cenozoic rock sequences found in North America. Conglomerate rocks composed of quartzite and interspersed with mudstone and sandstones were deposited during erosion from a now vanished mountain range that existed to the northwest of the current Teton Range. These deposits also have trace quantities of gold and mercury. During the Eocene and Oligocene, volcanic eruptions from the ancestral Absaroka Range buried the region under various volcanic deposits. Sedimentary basins developed in the region due to drop faulting, creating an ancestral Jackson Hole and by the Pliocene (10 million years ago), an ancestral Jackson Lake known as Teewinot Lake. During the Quaternary, landslides, erosion and glacial activity deposited soils and rock debris throughout the Snake River valley of Jackson Hole and left behind terminal moraines which impound the current lakes. The most recent example of rapid alteration to the landscape occurred in 1925 just east of the park when the Gros Ventre landslide was triggered by spring melt from a heavy snowpack as well as heavy rain.

== Ecology ==
=== Flora ===
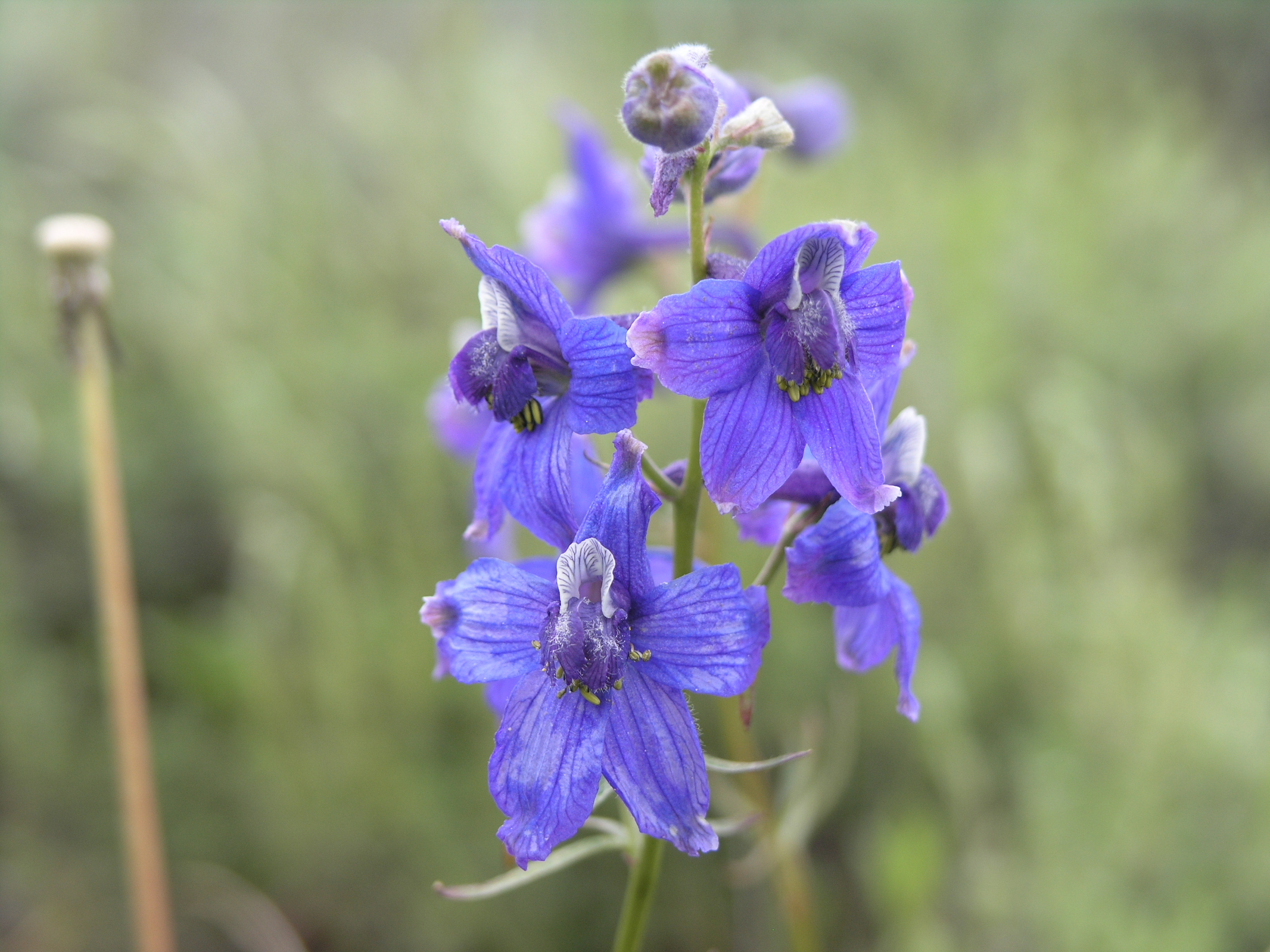
Low larkspur is one of over a hundred flower species found in the park.

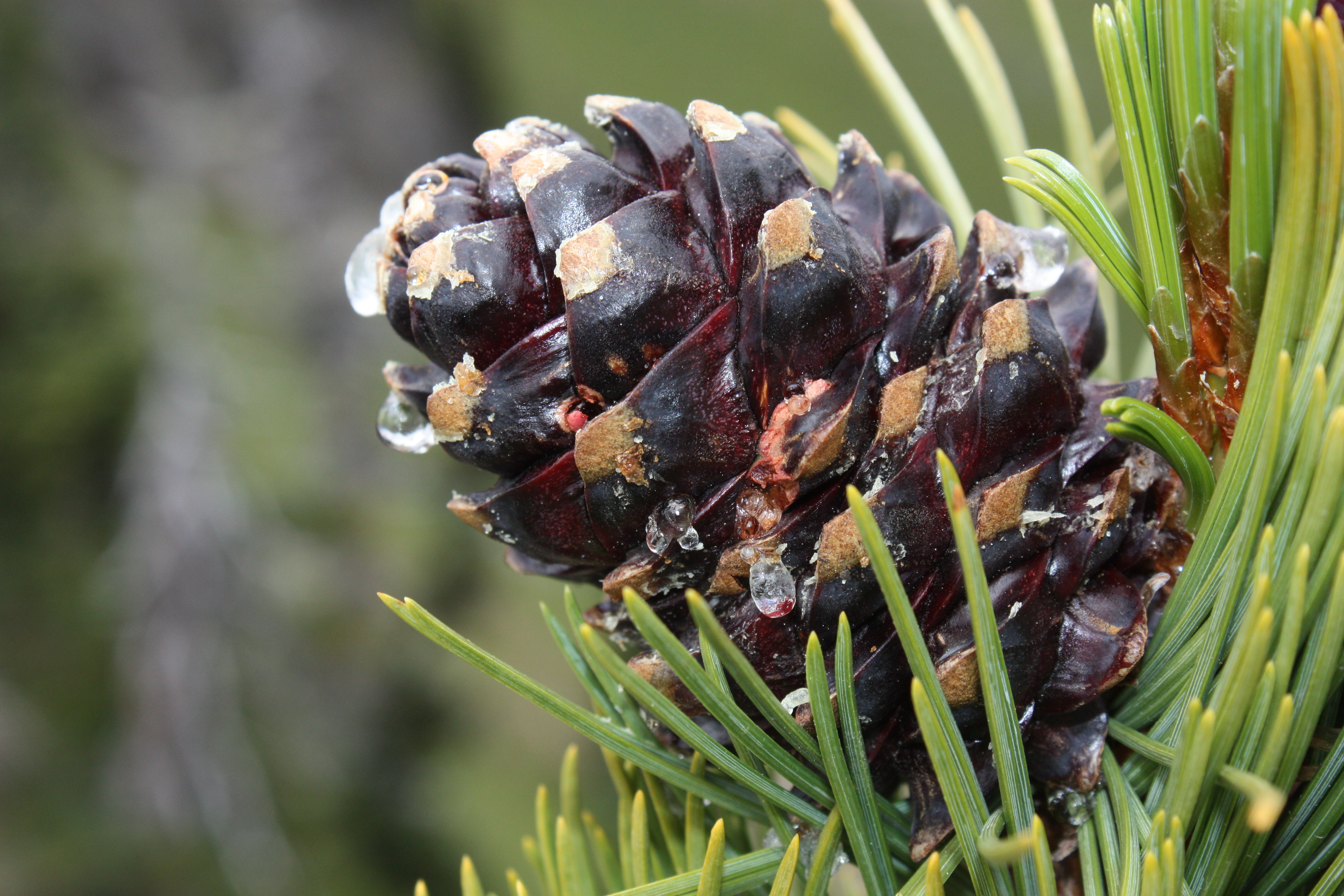
Whitebark pine cones protect seeds that are an important food source.

Grand Teton National Park and the surrounding region host over 1,000 species of vascular plants. With an altitude range of over 7,000 ft (2,100 m), the park has a number of different ecological zones including alpine tundra, the Rocky Mountains subalpine zone where spruce-fir forests are dominant, and the valley floor, where a mixed conifer and deciduous forest zone occupies regions with better soils intermixed with sagebrush plains atop alluvial deposits. Additionally, wetlands near some lakes and in the valley floor adjacent to rivers and streams cover large expanses, especially along the Snake River near Oxbow Bend near Moran and Willow Flats near the Jackson Lake Lodge. Altitude, available soils, wildfire incidence, avalanches and human activities have a direct impact on the types of plant species in an immediate area. Where these various niches overlap is known as an ecotone.

The range of altitude in Grand Teton National Park impacts the types of plant species found at various elevations. In the alpine zone above the tree line, which in Grand Teton National Park is at approximately 10,000 ft (3,000 m), tundra conditions prevail. In this treeless region, hundreds of species of grass, wildflower, moss and lichen are found. In the subalpine region from the tree line to the base of the mountains, whitebark pine, limber pine, subalpine fir, and Engelmann spruce are dominant. In the valley floor, lodgepole pine is most common but Rocky Mountain Douglas-fir, and blue spruce inhabit drier areas, while aspen, cottonwood, alder, and willow are more commonly found around lakes, streams, and wetlands. However, the tablelands above the Snake River channel are mostly sagebrush plains and in terms of acreage are the most widespread habitat in the park. The sagebrush plains or flats have 100 species of grasses and wildflowers. Slightly more elevated sections of the plains of the northern sections of Jackson Hole form forest islands with one such obvious example being Timbered Island. In this ecotone, forested islands surrounded by sagebrush expanses provide shelter for various animal species during the day and nearby grasses for nighttime foraging.

While the flora of Grand Teton National Park is generally healthy, the whitebark pine, and to a lesser degree the lodgepole pine, are considered at risk. In the case of the whitebark pine, an invasive species of fungus known as white pine blister rust weakens the tree, making it more susceptible to destruction from endemic mountain pine beetles. Whitebark pines generally thrive at elevations above 8,000 ft (2,400 m) and produce large seeds that are high in fat content and an important food source for various species such as the grizzly bear, red squirrel and Clark's nutcracker. The species is considered to be a keystone and a foundation species; keystone in that its "ecological role (is) disproportionately large relative to its abundance" and foundation in that it has a paramount role that "defines ecosystem structure, function, and process". Whitebark pine has generally had a lower incidence of blister rust infection throughout the Greater Yellowstone Ecosystem than in other regions such as Glacier National Park and the Cascade Range. The incidence of blister rust on whitebark pines in Yellowstone National Park is slightly lower than in Grand Teton. Though blister rust is not in itself the cause of increased mortality, its weakening effect on trees allows native pine beetles to have more easily infest the trees, increasing mortality. While general practice in national parks is to allow nature to take its course, the alarming trend of increased disease and mortality of the vital whitebark pine trees has sparked a collaborative effort amongst various government entities to intervene to protect the species.

=== Fauna ===
Sixty-one species of mammals have been recorded in Grand Teton National Park. This includes the gray wolf, which had been extirpated from the region by the early 1900s but migrated into the Grand Teton National Park from adjacent Yellowstone National Park after the species had been reintroduced there. The re-establishment of the wolves has ensured that every indigenous mammal species now exists in the park. In addition to gray wolves, another 17 species of carnivorans reside within Grand Teton National Park including grizzlies and the more commonly seen American black bear. Relatively common sightings of coyote, river otter, marten and badger and occasional sightings of cougar, lynx and wolverine are reported annually. A number of rodent species exist including yellow-bellied marmot, least chipmunk, muskrat, beaver, Uinta ground squirrel, pika, snowshoe hare, porcupine, and six species of bats.

Of the larger mammals, the most common are elk, which exist in the thousands. Their migration route between the National Elk Refuge and Yellowstone National Park is through Grand Teton National Park, so while easily seen anytime of the year, they are most numerous in the spring and fall. Other ungulates in the park include moose, bison, and pronghorn—the fastest land mammal in the western hemisphere. The park's moose tend to stay near waterways and wetlands. Between 100 and 125 bighorn sheep dwell in the alpine and rocky zones of the peaks.

Over 300 species of birds have been sighted in the park including the calliope hummingbird, the smallest bird species in mainland North America, as well as trumpeter swans, which is North America's largest waterfowl. In addition to trumpeter swans, another 30 species of waterfowl have been recorded including blue-winged teal, common merganser, American wigeon and the colorful but reclusive harlequin duck which is occasionally spotted in Cascade Canyon. Both bald and golden eagles and other birds of prey such as the osprey, red-tailed hawk, American kestrel and occasional sightings of peregrine falcon have been reported. Of the 14 species of owls reported, the most common is the great horned owl, though the boreal owl and great grey owl are also seen occasionally. A dozen species of woodpeckers have been reported, as have a similar number of species of warblers, plovers and gulls. The vocal and gregarious black-billed magpie frequents campgrounds while Steller's jay and Clark's nutcracker are found in the backcountry. The sage covered plains of Jackson Hole are favored areas for sage grouse, Brewer's sparrow and sage thrashers, while the wetlands are frequented by great blue heron, American white pelican, sandhill crane and on rare occasions its endangered relative, the whooping crane.

The Snake River fine-spotted cutthroat trout (or Snake River cutthroat trout) is the only native trout species in Grand Teton National Park. It is also the only subspecies of cutthroat trout that is exclusively native to large streams and rivers. Various researchers have not been able to identify any genetic differences between the Snake River fine-spotted cutthroat trout and the Yellowstone cutthroat trout, though in terms of appearances, the Snake River subspecies has much smaller spots that cover a greater portion of the body, and the two subspecies inhabit different ecological niches. The Snake River fine-spotted cutthroat trout was identified by some researchers as a separate subspecies by the mid-1990s, and is managed as a distinct subspecies by the state of Wyoming, but is not yet recognized as such by the neighboring states of Idaho and Montana. Snake River fine-spotted cutthroat trout is found only in the Snake River and tributaries below the Jackson Lake dam to the Palisades Reservoir in Idaho. Other non-native species of trout such as the rainbow trout and lake trout were introduced by the Wyoming Fish and Game Department or migrated out of Yellowstone. Today five trout species inhabit park waters. Native species of fish include the mountain whitefish, longnose dace, mountain sucker and non-native species include the Utah chub and Arctic grayling.

Only four species of reptiles are documented in the park: three species of snakes which are the wandering garter snake, the less commonly seen valley garter snake, and rubber boa, as well as one lizard species, the northern sagebrush lizard, that was first reported in 1992. None of the species are venomous. Six amphibian species have been documented including the Columbia spotted frog, boreal chorus frog, tiger salamander and the increasingly rare boreal toad and northern leopard frog. A sixth amphibian species, the bullfrog, was introduced. An estimated 10,000 insect species frequent the park; they pollinate plants, provide a food source for birds, fish, mammals, and other animals, and help in the decomposition of wood. In one example of the importance of insects to the ecosystem, swarms of Army cutworm moths die in huge numbers after mating and provide a high fat and protein diet for bears and other predators. One study concluded that when this moth species is most available, bears consume 40,000 moths per day which is roughly 20,000 kcal/day.

Grand Teton National Park permits the hunting of elk to keep the populations of that species regulated. This provision was included in the legislation that combined Jackson Hole National Monument and Grand Teton National Park in 1950. While some national parks in Alaska permit subsistence hunting by indigenous natives and a few other National Park Service managed areas allow hunting under highly regulated circumstances, hunting in American national parks is not generally allowed. In Grand Teton National Park, hunters are required to obtain Wyoming hunting licenses and be deputized as park rangers. Hunting is restricted to areas east of the Snake River, and north of Moran, the hunt is permitted only east of U.S. Route 89. Proponents of continuing the elk hunt, which occurs in the fall, argue that the elk herd would become overpopulated without it, leading to vegetation degradation from overgrazing elk herds. Opponents cite that there has been an increase of predators such as the wolf and grizzly bear in Grand Teton National Park, rendering the annual hunt unnecessary and exposing hunters to attacks by grizzly bears as they become accustomed to feeding on remains left behind from the hunt.

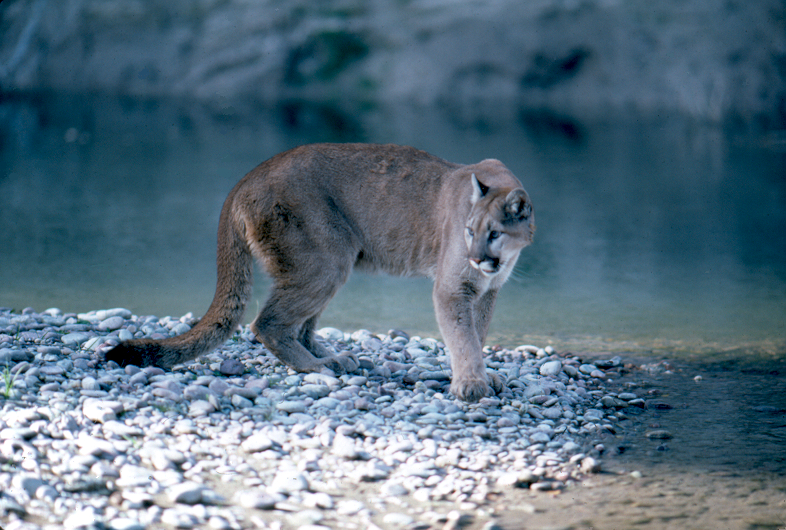
Though cougars are present in Grand Teton, they are rarely seen.

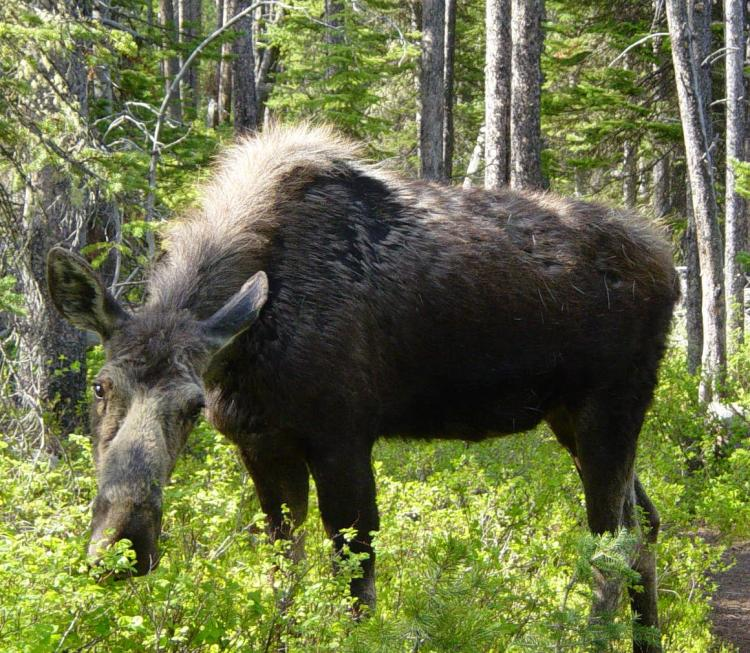
Moose near Leigh Lake

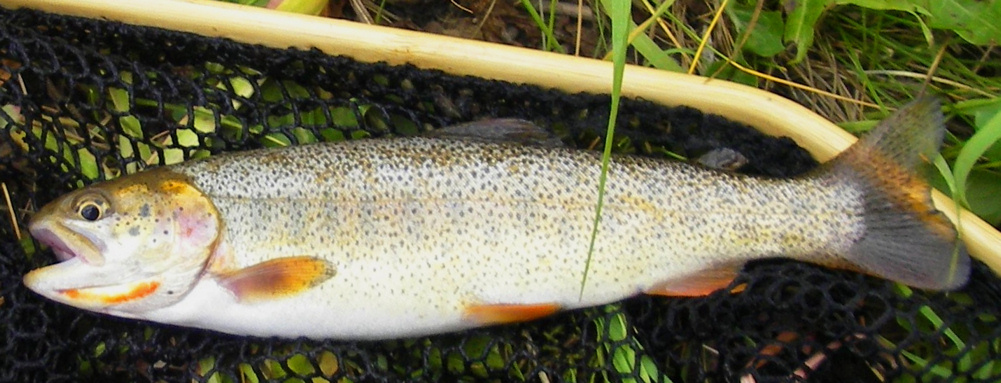
Snake River fine-spotted cutthroat trout has tiny black spots over most of its body.

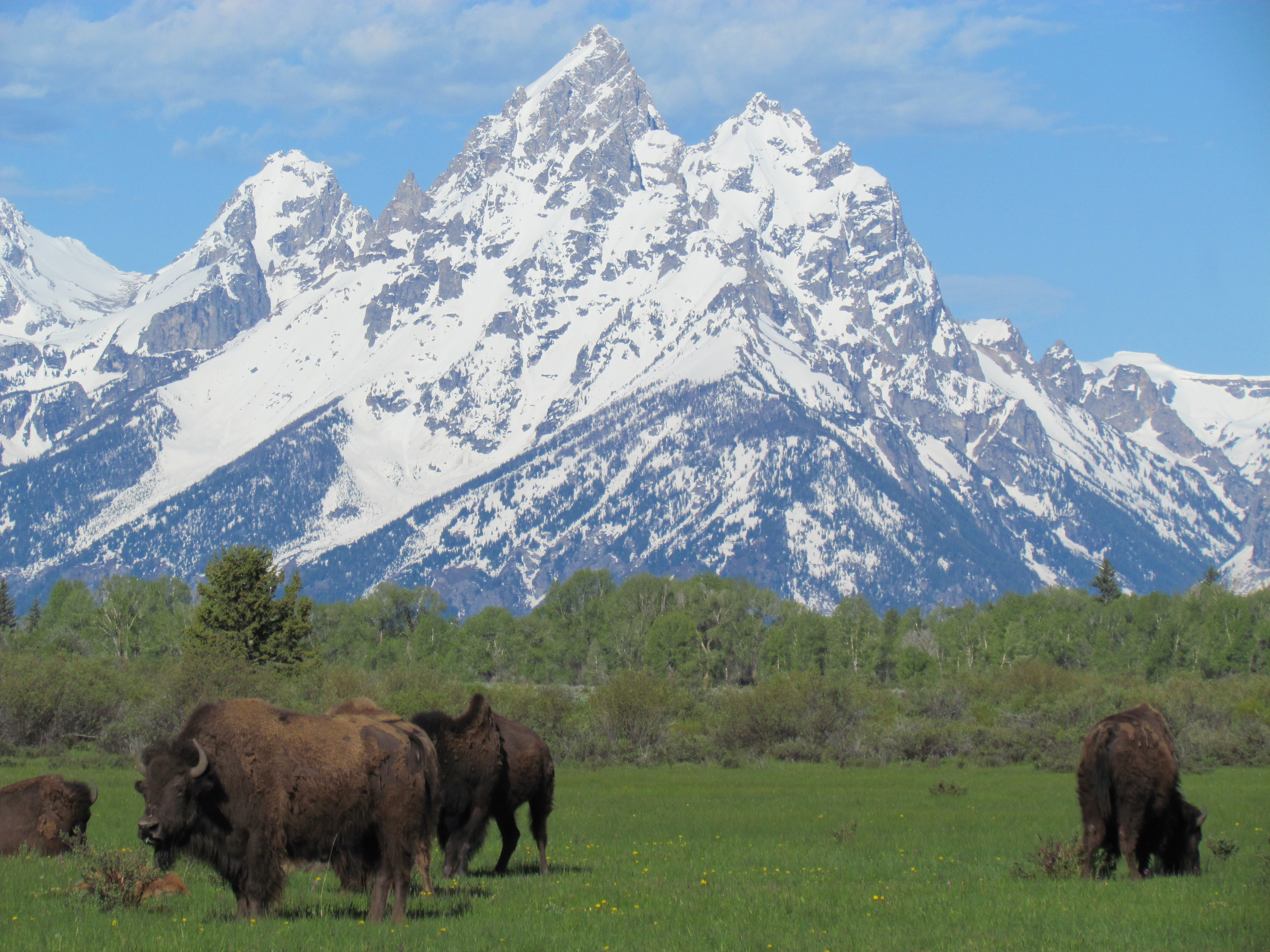
Bison grazing in Jackson Hole

=== Fire ecology ===
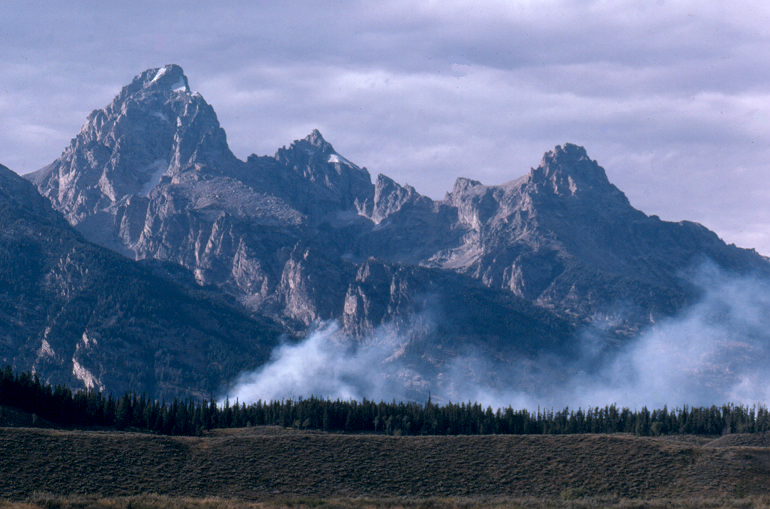
A forest fire near Beaver Creek

The role of wildfire is an important one for plant and animal species diversity. Many tree species have evolved to mainly germinate after a wildfire. Regions of the park that have experienced wildfire in historical times have greater species diversity after reestablishment than those regions that have not been influenced by fire. Though the Yellowstone fires of 1988 had minimal impact on Grand Teton National Park, studies conducted before and reaffirmed after that event concluded that the suppression of natural wildfires during the middle part of the 20th century decreased plant species diversity and natural regeneration of plant communities. One study conducted 15 years before the 1988 Yellowstone National Park fires concluded that human suppression of wildfire had adversely impacted Aspen tree groves and other forest types. The majority of conifer species in Grand Teton National Park are heavily dependent on wildfire and this is particularly true of the Lodgepole Pine. Though extremely hot canopy or crown fires tend to kill Lodgepole Pine seeds, lower severity surface fires usually result in a higher post-wildfire regeneration of this species. In accordance with a better understanding of the role wildfire plays in the environment, the National Park Service and other land management agencies have developed Fire Management Plans which provide a strategy for wildfire management and are expected to best enhance the natural ecosystem.

=== Air and water quality ===
Grand Teton National Park is more than 100 mi (160 km) air distance from any major urban or industrial area, and localized human activities have generally had a very low environmental impact on the surrounding region. However, levels of ammonium and nitrogen have been trending slightly upwards due to deposition from rain and snow that is believed to originate from regional agricultural activities. Additionally, there has also been a slight increase in mercury and pesticides that have been detected in snow and some alpine lakes. Ozone and haze may be impacting overall visibility levels. Grand Teton National Park, in partnership with other agencies, erected the first air quality monitoring station in the park in 2011. The station is designed to check for various pollutants as well as ozone levels and weather.

A 2005 study of the water of Jackson, Jenny, and Taggart Lakes indicated that all three of these lakes had virtually pristine water quality. Of the three lakes, only on Taggart Lake are motorized boats prohibited, yet little difference in water quality was detected in the three lakes. In a study published in 2002, the Snake River was found to have better overall water quality than other river systems in Wyoming, and low levels of pollution from anthropogenic sources.

== Climate ==
According to the Köppen climate classification system, Grand Teton National Park has a humid continental climate (Dfb).

Climate data for Moose, Wyoming, 1991–2020 normals, extremes 1958–present
Month	Jan	Feb	Mar	Apr	May	Jun	Jul	Aug	Sep	Oct	Nov	Dec	Year
Record high °F (°C)	50 (10)	55 (13)	65 (18)	78 (26)	88 (31)	92 (33)	97 (36)	97 (36)	92 (33)	83 (28)	67 (19)	55 (13)	97 (36)
Mean maximum °F (°C)	41.6 (5.3)	45.6 (7.6)	53.9 (12.2)	66.8 (19.3)	77.1 (25.1)	85.0 (29.4)	90.2 (32.3)	90.2 (32.3)	84.8 (29.3)	73.2 (22.9)	56.3 (13.5)	43.7 (6.5)	91.4 (33.0)
Mean daily maximum °F (°C)	27.4 (−2.6)	32.3 (0.2)	41.7 (5.4)	50.2 (10.1)	61.5 (16.4)	71.1 (21.7)	81.7 (27.6)	80.7 (27.1)	70.8 (21.6)	55.6 (13.1)	39.3 (4.1)	28.2 (−2.1)	53.4 (11.9)
Daily mean °F (°C)	14.3 (−9.8)	19.2 (−7.1)	28.2 (−2.1)	36.9 (2.7)	47.1 (8.4)	54.9 (12.7)	62.7 (17.1)	61.2 (16.2)	52.5 (11.4)	40.3 (4.6)	27.4 (−2.6)	16.2 (−8.8)	38.4 (3.6)
Mean daily minimum °F (°C)	1.2 (−17.1)	6.2 (−14.3)	14.8 (−9.6)	23.7 (−4.6)	32.7 (0.4)	38.6 (3.7)	43.7 (6.5)	41.7 (5.4)	34.2 (1.2)	25.1 (−3.8)	15.4 (−9.2)	4.3 (−15.4)	23.5 (−4.7)
Mean minimum °F (°C)	−21.8 (−29.9)	−18.0 (−27.8)	−6.4 (−21.3)	8.4 (−13.1)	19.3 (−7.1)	27.6 (−2.4)	33.9 (1.1)	30.6 (−0.8)	21.7 (−5.7)	9.8 (−12.3)	−7.2 (−21.8)	−19.2 (−28.4)	−25.6 (−32.0)
Record low °F (°C)	−46 (−43)	−42 (−41)	−25 (−32)	−10 (−23)	7 (−14)	20 (−7)	26 (−3)	22 (−6)	6 (−14)	−9 (−23)	−25 (−32)	−43 (−42)	−46 (−43)
Average precipitation inches (mm)	2.64 (67)	2.22 (56)	1.81 (46)	1.80 (46)	1.99 (51)	1.81 (46)	1.15 (29)	1.22 (31)	1.57 (40)	1.69 (43)	2.33 (59)	2.78 (71)	23.01 (585)
Average snowfall inches (cm)	40.5 (103)	28.4 (72)	19.5 (50)	9.8 (25)	0.9 (2.3)	0.0 (0.0)	0.0 (0.0)	0.0 (0.0)	0.3 (0.76)	4.2 (11)	18.2 (46)	44.1 (112)	165.9 (422.06)
Average precipitation days (≥ 0.01 in)	15.8	14.5	11.5	10.3	12.0	10.9	8.8	8.7	8.3	9.3	10.4	16.1	136.6
Average snowy days (≥ 0.1 in)	16.1	13.4	9.1	5.5	1.1	0.0	0.0	0.0	0.2	2.4	8.0	15.1	70.9
Source: NOAA

== Recreation ==
=== Mountaineering ===
Grand Teton National Park is a popular destination for mountain and rock climbers partly because the mountains are easily accessible by road. Trails are well marked and routes to the summits of most peaks are long established, and for the experienced and fit, most peaks can be climbed in one day. The highest maintained trails climb from the floor of Jackson Hole over 4,000 feet (1,200 m) to mountain passes that are sometimes called saddles or divides. From these passes, the climbs follow routes that require varying skill levels. Climbers do not need a permit but are encouraged to voluntarily register their climbing plans with the National Park Service and inform associates of their itinerary. Any climb requiring an overnight stay in the backcountry does require a permit. Climbers are essentially on their own to determine their own skill levels and are encouraged to not take unnecessary risks. The Exum Mountain Guides, which is considered one of the finest mountaineering guide services in the U.S., as well as the Jackson Hole Mountain Guides, offer instruction and climbing escorts for those who are less experienced or unfamiliar with various routes.

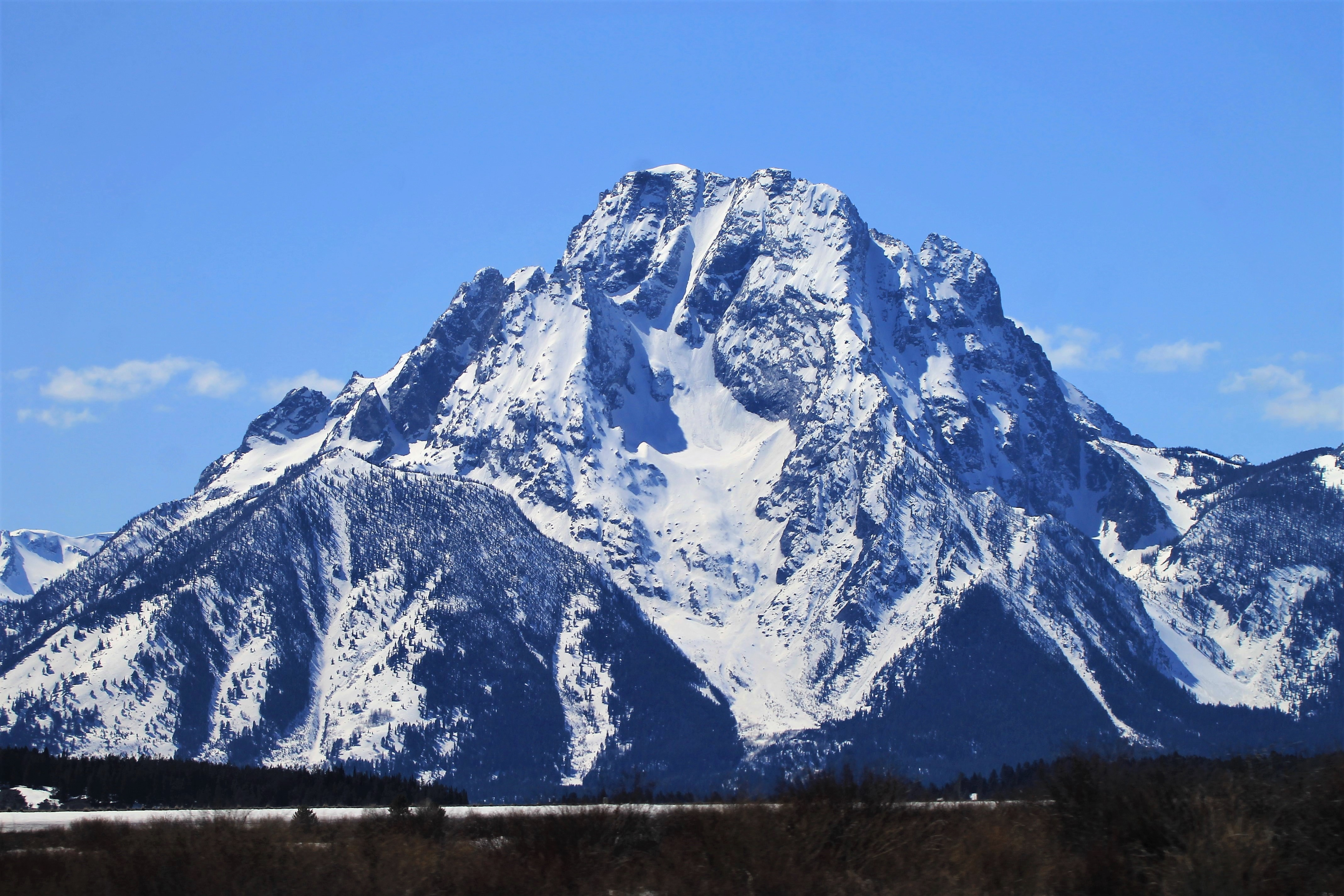
Mount Moran at 12,605 feet elevation

An average of 4,000 climbers per year make an attempt to summit Grand Teton and most ascend up Garnet Canyon to a mountain pass called the Lower Saddle, which is between Grand Teton and Middle Teton. From the Lower Saddle, climbers often follow the Owen-Spalding or Exum Ridge routes to the top of Grand Teton though there are 38 distinct routes to the summit. The north face route to the summit of Grand Teton is a world-renowned climb involving a dozen distinct pitches and is rated at grade 5.8 in difficulty for the 3,000-foot (910 m) vertical ascent. On a connecting ridge and just north of Grand Teton lies Mount Owen, and though lower in altitude, this peak is considered more difficult to ascend. Middle Teton is another popular climb that is most easily summited from a saddle between it and South Teton. Well, north of Grand Teton lies Mount Moran, which is further from trailheads and more difficult to access and ascend. The Direct South Buttress of Mount Moran provides a vertical mile of climbing that was considered the most difficult climb in the U.S. when first accomplished in 1953. Other popular climbing destinations include Buck Mountain, Symmetry Spire, Mount Saint John, Mount Wister, Teewinot Mountain and Nez Perce Peak and each mountain has at least six established routes to their summits.

=== Camping and hiking ===
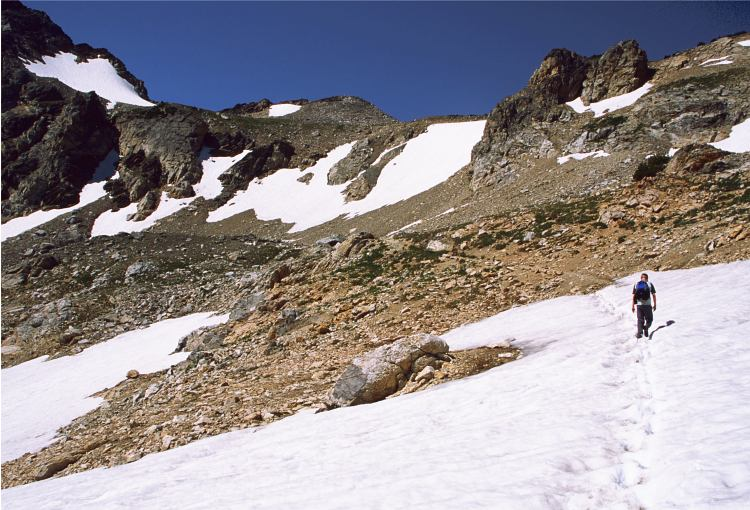
Hiker crosses snowfield en route to Paintbrush Divide.

Grand Teton National Park has five front-country vehicular access campgrounds. The largest is the Colter Bay and Gros Ventre campgrounds, and each has 350 campsites which can accommodate large recreational vehicles. Lizard Creek and Signal Mountain campgrounds have 60 and 86 campsites respectively, while the smaller Jenny Lake campground has only 49 sites for tent use only. Additionally, full hookups for recreational vehicles are at the concessionaire-managed 112 campsites at Colter Bay Village and another 100 at Flagg Ranch in the John D. Rockefeller Memorial Parkway. Though all front-country campgrounds are only open from late spring to late fall, primitive winter camping is permitted at Colter Bay near the visitor center.

All campsites accessible only on foot or by horseback are considered backcountry campsites and they are available by permit only, but camping is allowed in most of these backcountry zones year-round. The National Park Service has a combination of specific sites and zones for backcountry camping with a set carrying capacity of overnight stays per zone to protect the resources from overcrowding. Open fires are not permitted in the backcountry and all food must be stored in an Interagency Grizzly Bear Committee approved bear-resistant container. As of 2012, only four brands of bear-resistant containers had been approved for use in the Grand Teton National Park backcountry. Additionally, hikers may use an approved bear spray to elude aggressive bears.

The park has 200 miles (320 km) of hiking trails, ranging in difficulty from easy to strenuous. The easiest hiking trails are located in the valley, where the altitude changes are generally minimal. In the vicinity of Colter Bay Village, the Hermitage Point Trail is 9.4 miles (15.1 km) long and considered easy. Several other trails link Hermitage Point with Emma Matilda Lake and Two Ocean Lake Trails, also considered to be relatively easy hikes in the Jackson Lake Lodge area. Other easy hikes include the Valley Trail which runs from Trapper Lake in the north to the south park boundary near Teton Village and the Jenny Lake Trail which circles the lake. Ranging from moderate to strenuous in difficulty, trails leading into the canyons are rated based on distance and more importantly on the amount of elevation change. The greatest elevation change is found on the Paintbrush Canyon, Alaska Basin and Garnet Canyon Trails, where elevation increases of over 4,000 feet (1,200 m) are typical. Horses and pack animals are permitted on almost all trails in the park; however, there are only five designated backcountry camping locations for pack animals and these campsites are far from the high mountain passes. Bicycles are limited to vehicle roadways only and the park has widened some roads to provide a safer biking experience. A paved multi-use pathway opened in 2009 and provides non-motorized biking access from the town of Jackson to South Jenny Lake.

=== Boating and fishing ===
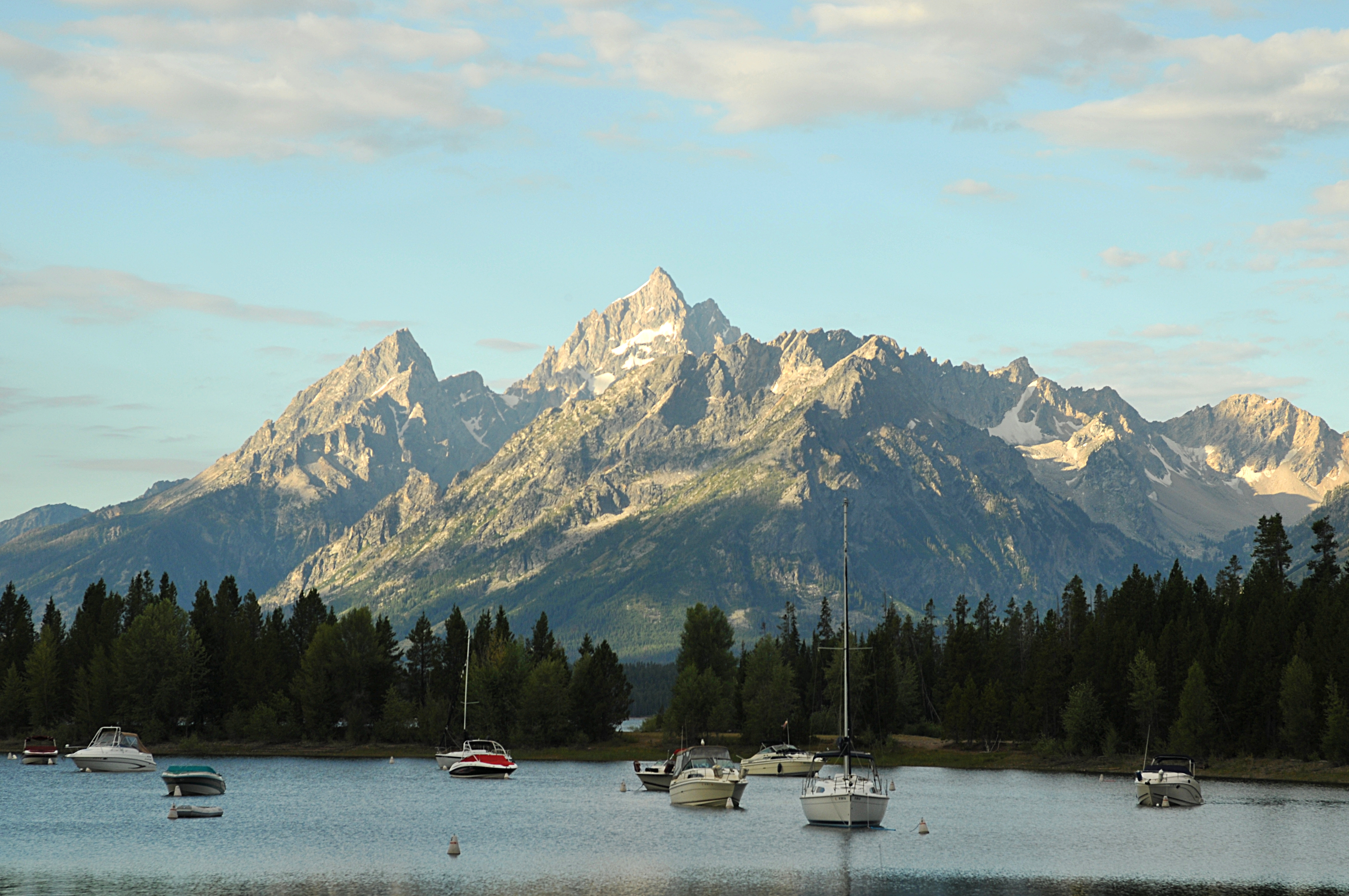
Boats anchored at the Colter Bay Marina

Grand Teton National Park allows boating on all the lakes in Jackson Hole, but motorized boats can only be used on Jackson and Jenny Lakes. While there is no maximum horsepower limit on Jackson Lake (though there is a noise restriction), Jenny Lake is restricted to 10 horsepower. Only non-motorized boats are permitted on Bearpaw, Bradley, Emma Matilda, Leigh, Phelps, String, Taggart and Two Ocean Lakes. There are four designated boat launches located on Jackson Lake and one on Jenny Lake. Additionally, sailboats, windsurfers, and water skiing are only allowed on Jackson Lake and no jet skis are permitted on any of the park waterways. All boats are required to comply with various safety regulations including personal flotation devices for each passenger. Only non-motorized watercraft are permitted on the Snake River. All other waterways in the park are off limits to boating, and this includes all alpine lakes and tributary streams of the Snake River.

In 2010, Grand Teton National Park started requiring all boats to display an Aquatic Invasive Species decal issued by the Wyoming Game and Fish Department or a Yellowstone National Park boat permit. In an effort to keep the park waterways free of various invasive species such as the Zebra mussel and whirling disease, boaters are expected to abide by certain regulations including displaying a self-certification of compliance on the dashboard of any vehicle attached to an empty boat trailer.

Grand Teton National Park fisheries are managed by the Wyoming Fish and Game Department and a Wyoming state fishing license is required to fish all waterways in Grand Teton National Park. The creel limit for trout is restricted to six per day, including no more than three cutthroat trout with none longer than 12 in (30 cm), while the maximum length of other trout species may not exceed 20 in (51 cm), except those taken from Jackson Lake, where the maximum allowable length is 24 in (61 cm). There are also restrictions as to the seasonal accessibility to certain areas as well as the types of bait and fishing tackle permitted.

=== Winter activities ===
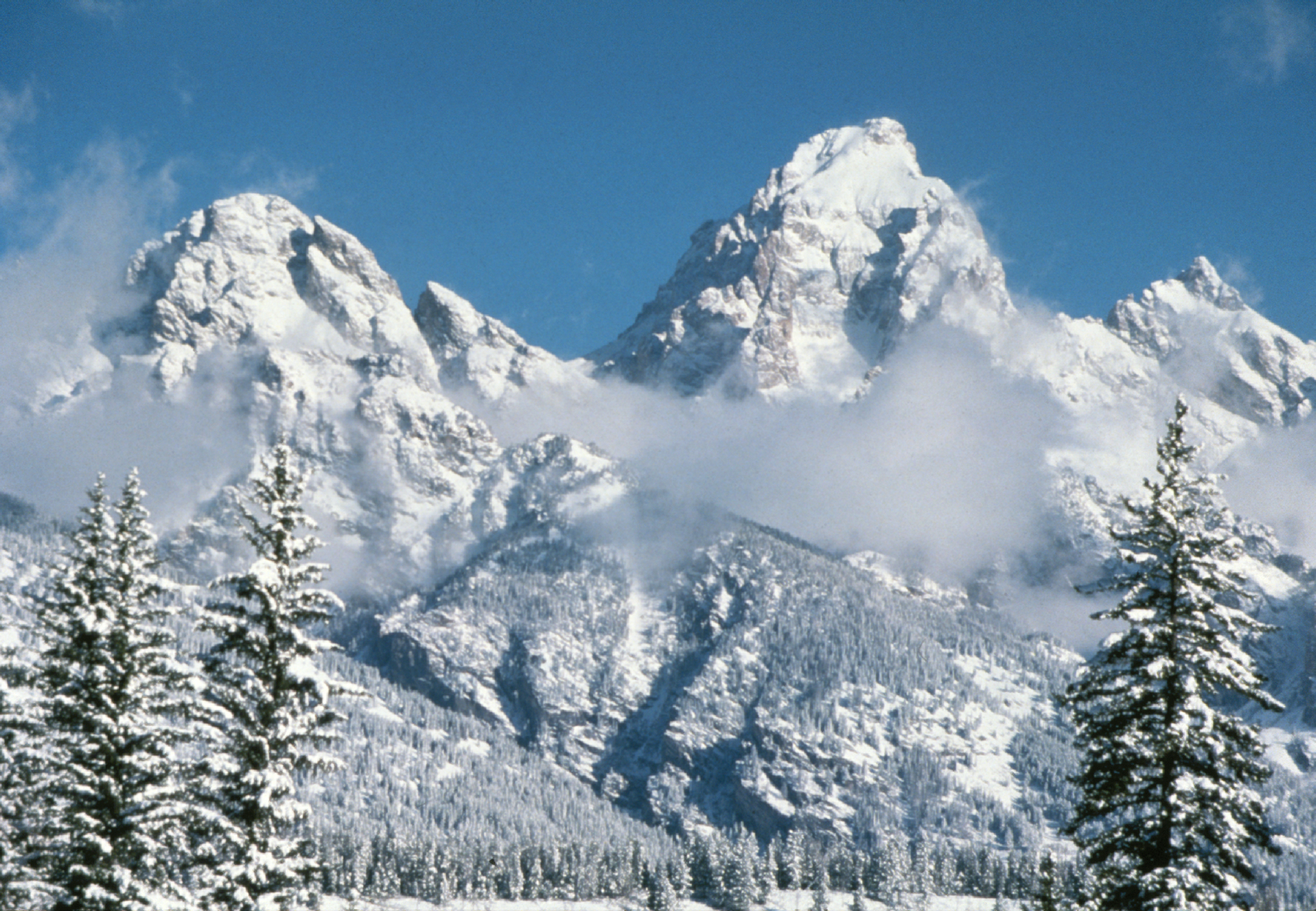
Left to right, Nez Perce, Grand Teton, and Mount Owen in the winter

Visitors are allowed to snowshoe and do cross-country skiing and are not restricted to trails. The Teton Park Road between the Taggart Lake trailhead to Signal Mountain Campground is closed to vehicular traffic during the winter and this section of the road is groomed for skiing and snowshoeing traffic. The park service offers guided snowshoe tours daily from the main headquarters located in Moose, Wyoming. Overnight camping is allowed in the winter in the backcountry with a permit and visitors should inquire about avalanche dangers.

The only location in Grand Teton National Park where snowmobiles are permitted is on Jackson Lake. The National Park Service requires that all snowmobiles use "Best Available Technology" (BAT) and lists various models of snowmobiles that are permitted, all of which are deemed to provide the least amount of air pollution and maximize noise abatement. All snowmobiles must be less than 10 years old and have odometer readings of less than 6,000 mi (9,700 km). Additionally, snowmobile use is for the purposes of accessing ice fishing locations only. Snowmobile access was permitted between Moran Junction and Flagg Ranch adjacent to the John D. Rockefeller Jr. Memorial Parkway so that travelers using the Continental Divide Snowmobile Trail could traverse between Bridger-Teton National Forest and Yellowstone National Park. However, in 2009, winter use planners closed this since unguided snowmobile access into Yellowstone National Park was also discontinued.

== Tourism ==
=== Visitor centers ===
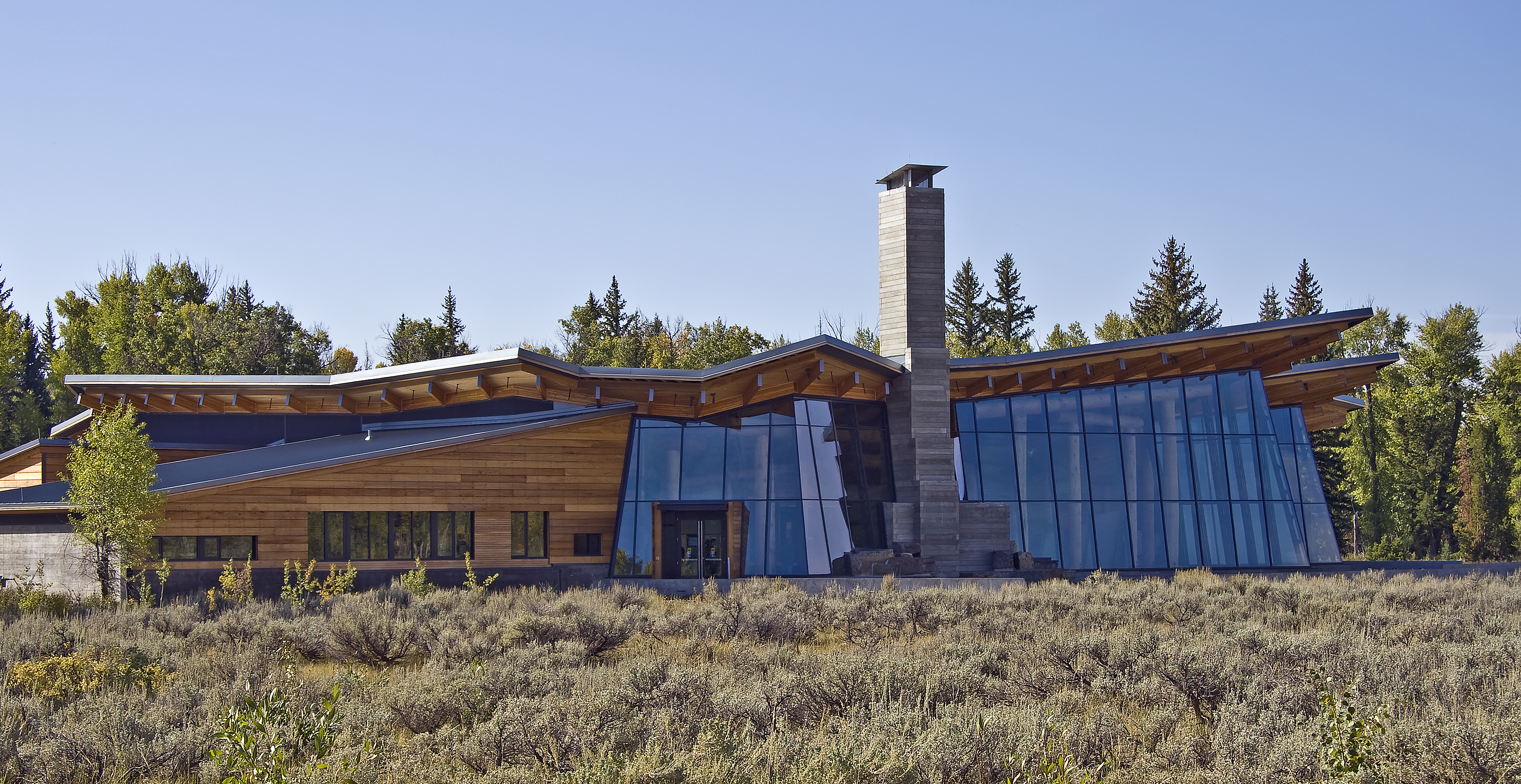
Craig Thomas Discovery and Visitor Center in Moose, Wyoming

The Craig Thomas Discovery and Visitor Center adjacent to the park headquarters at Moose, Wyoming, is open year-round. Opened in 2007 to replace an old, inadequate visitor center, the facility is named for the late U.S. Senator Craig Thomas and designed by acclaimed architect, Bohlin Cywinski Jackson. It was financed with a combination of federal grants and private donations. An adjoining 154-seat auditorium was opened to the public in April 2011. To the north at Colter Bay Village on Jackson Lake, the Colter Bay Visitor Center & Indian Arts Museum is open from the beginning of May to the early October. The Colter Bay Visitor Center & Indian Arts Museum has housed the David T. Vernon Indian Arts Exhibit since 1972. The Colter Bay Visitor Center was built in 1956 and was determined in 2005 to be substandard for the proper care and display of the Indian art collection. During the winter of 2011–2012, a $150,000 renovation project was completed at the center and a portion of the arts collection was made available for viewing when the center opened for the season in May 2012.

South of Moose on the Moose–Wilson Road, the Laurance S. Rockefeller Preserve Center is located on land that was privately owned by Laurance S. Rockefeller and is situated on Phelps Lake. Donated to Grand Teton National Park and opened to the public in 2008, the property was once part of the JY Ranch, the first dude ranch in Jackson Hole. At Jenny Lake, the Jenny Lake Visitor Center is open from mid-May to mid-September. This visitor center is within the Jenny Lake Ranger Station Historic District and is the same structure photographer Harrison Crandall had constructed as an art studio in the 1920s.

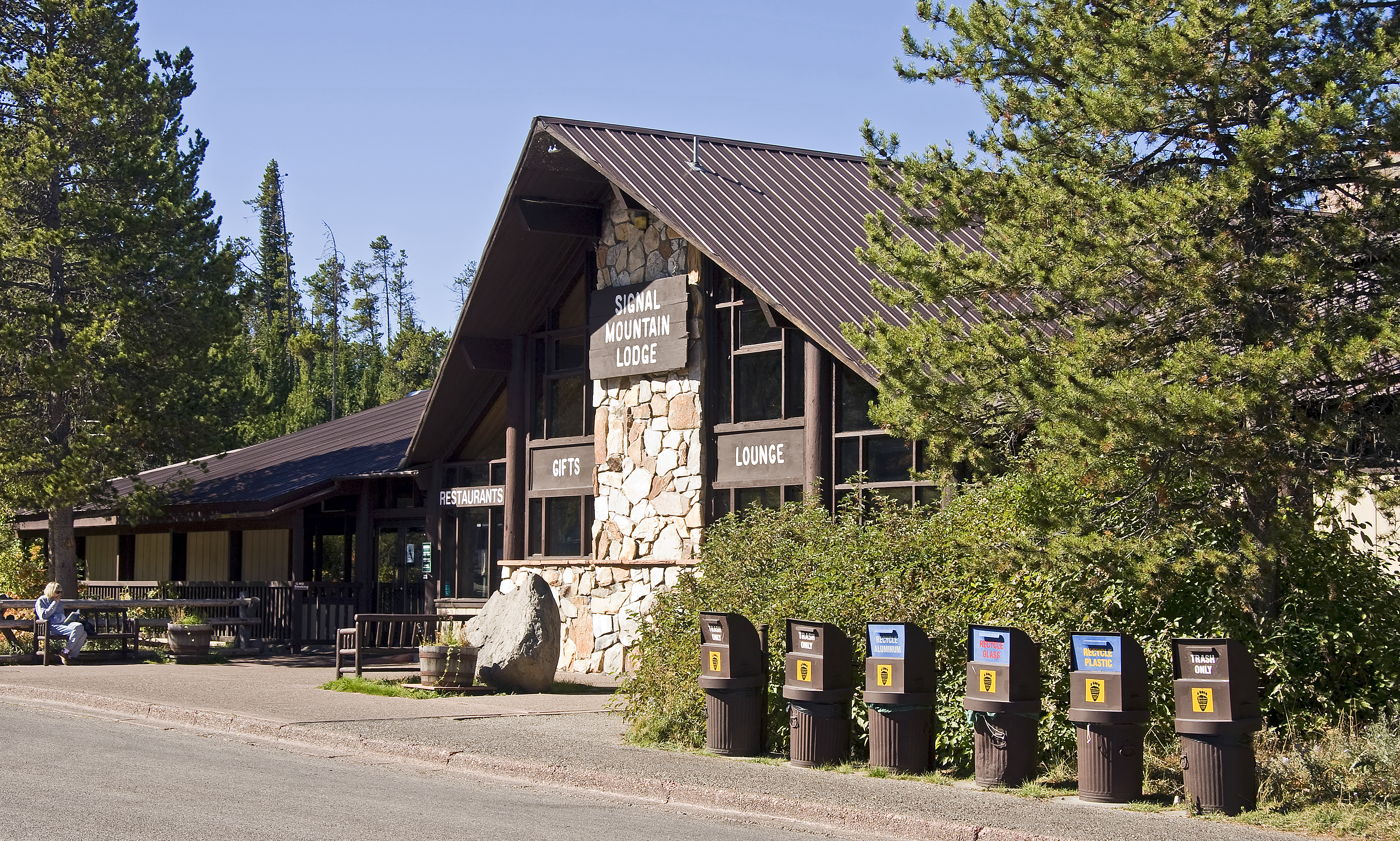
Signal Mountain Lodge

=== Accommodations ===
Contracted through the National Park Service, various concessionaire entities manage lodging facilities inside the park. The largest such facility is the Jackson Lake Lodge, which is managed by the Grand Teton Lodge Company. Located near Jackson Lake Dam, the Jackson Lake Lodge has a total of 385 rooms, meeting facilities, a retail shop, and a restaurant. The Grand Teton Lodge Company also manages the Jenny Lake Lodge, which consists of cabins and a restaurant, and Colter Bay Village, which has cabins, a restaurant, a grocery store, and a laundry, and a marina. South of Jackson Lake Dam, the Signal Mountain Lodge is managed by Forever Resorts and provides cabins, a marina, a gas station and a restaurant. The American Alpine Club has hostel dormitory-style accommodations primarily reserved for mountain climbers at the Grand Teton Climber's Ranch. Adjacent to the Snake River in Moose, Wyoming, Dornan's is an inholding on private land which has year-round cabin accommodations and related facilities. Lodging is also available at the Triangle X Ranch, another private inholding in the park and the last remaining dude ranch within park boundaries.

== Hazards and incidents ==
Encountering bears is a concern in the Teton Range. As of 2011, there have been six attacks by bears within the park, though none have been fatal. In 2001, a hunter from Minnesota was mauled by a sow grizzly bear and suffered severe wounds to his head and scalp. In 2007, a 54-year-old man was injured when he came across a grizzly bear and her cubs feeding on a elk carcass. The man received injuries to his head and face before being rescued by a ranger.

There are other concerns as well, including bugs, wildfires, adverse snow conditions and nighttime cold temperatures. Avalanches occur with regularity during the winter and spring seasons. In 2025, a skier was killed after the group they were with triggered an avalanche while skiing in the park's backcountry.

Accidental falls resulting in death and injury from steep cliffs (a misstep could be fatal in this class 4/5 terrain) and due to falling rocks are not uncommon at the park. Lightning strikes have also resulted in death for climbers at the park. In 2020, Brayden DuRee fell while climbing the park's Owen-Spalding trail. In 2022, skier Radcliff Spencer fell from a slim trail while skiing in the park and was fatally injured. In 2023, Joy Cho fell from the west side of Teewinot mountain after losing her balance on the hiking trail.

Grand Teton National Park has been the site of several homicides. In 1986, a skull with a bullet hole was found on Signal Mountain that was later discovered to belong to a man that had gone missing in 1983. In 2002, a former park employee was killed while riding his bicycle within the park by a motorist who was later convicted of vehicular homicide. In 2021, the body of Gabby Petito, a domestic violence victim was found within the boundary of Grand Teton National Park after an extensive search.

== See also ==
- Outline of Grand Teton National Park
- List of national parks of the United States
- Jackson Hole Economic Symposium
