= Lower Exum Ridge Route =

Climbing route in Wyoming

- Direct Exum Ridge Route
- Location: Grand Teton National Park, Wyoming, United States
- Coordinates: 43.740561°N 110.802441°W
- Climbing area: Grand Teton
- Route type: Trad
- Vertical gain: 800 feet
- Pitches: 6
- Technical grade: 5.7
- NCCS grade: III
- First ascent: Jack Durrance & Kenneth Henderson, 1936.

The Lower Exum Ridge Route is the lower section of a technical rock climbing route up the Grand Teton's Exum Ridge in Wyoming. This section is often bypassed on hiking terrain by climbers who wish to do only the technically easier Upper Exum Ridge Route. The complete route is listed as the Direct Exum Ridge Route in Fifty Classic Climbs of North America.
