= Exuma (disambiguation) =

Exuma is a district of the Bahamas.

Exuma may also refer to:

- Exuma (musician) (1942–1997), Bahamian musician, artist, and playwright
  - Exuma (album), 1970
- Exuma International Airport, Great Exuma, Bahamas
- Exuma Sound, in the Bahama Islands

== See also ==
- Exum (disambiguation)
