= Exum Ridge =

Rock buttress on the Grand Teton in Wyoming

Coordinates: 43.740561°N 110.802441°W

The Exum Ridge is the name of a prominent rock buttress on the Grand Teton, the high point of the Teton Range in Wyoming. Grand Teton towers 13,770 feet above Jackson Hole, with an ascent of 6,700 feet which by any route requires a combination of hiking, rock climbing and rappelling.

The Ridge is named after Glenn Exum who pioneered a route, via a solo climb, on a day when his mentor Paul Petzoldt was guiding a couple up the original Owen-Spaulding Route. Today the route is split into the Upper and Lower Exum Ridge Routes. It is common for parties to bypass the more technically challenging lower section and climb exclusively the upper section. The Direct Exum Ridge Route which includes both section is recognized in the historic climbing text Fifty Classic Climbs of North America.

In 1931 Exum and Petzoldt started Exum Mountain Guides, which has grown to be a prestigious climbing school and mountain guide service. In 1982 Exum, accompanied by many distinguished mountaineers, made one last climb of the Exum Ridge route on the fiftieth anniversary of his first ascent.
