= Laurance S. Rockefeller Preserve =

Ranch with Grand Teton National Park, Wyoming, USA

Coordinates: 43°37′35″N 110°46′31″W

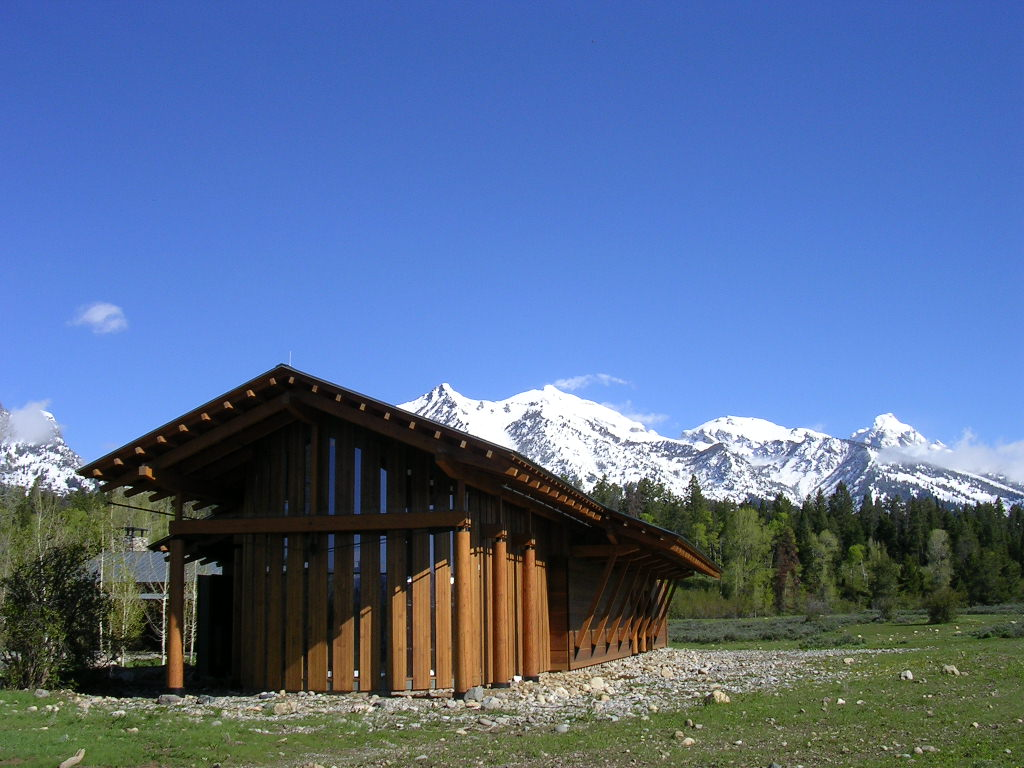
LSR Preserve visitor center, Teton Range beyond

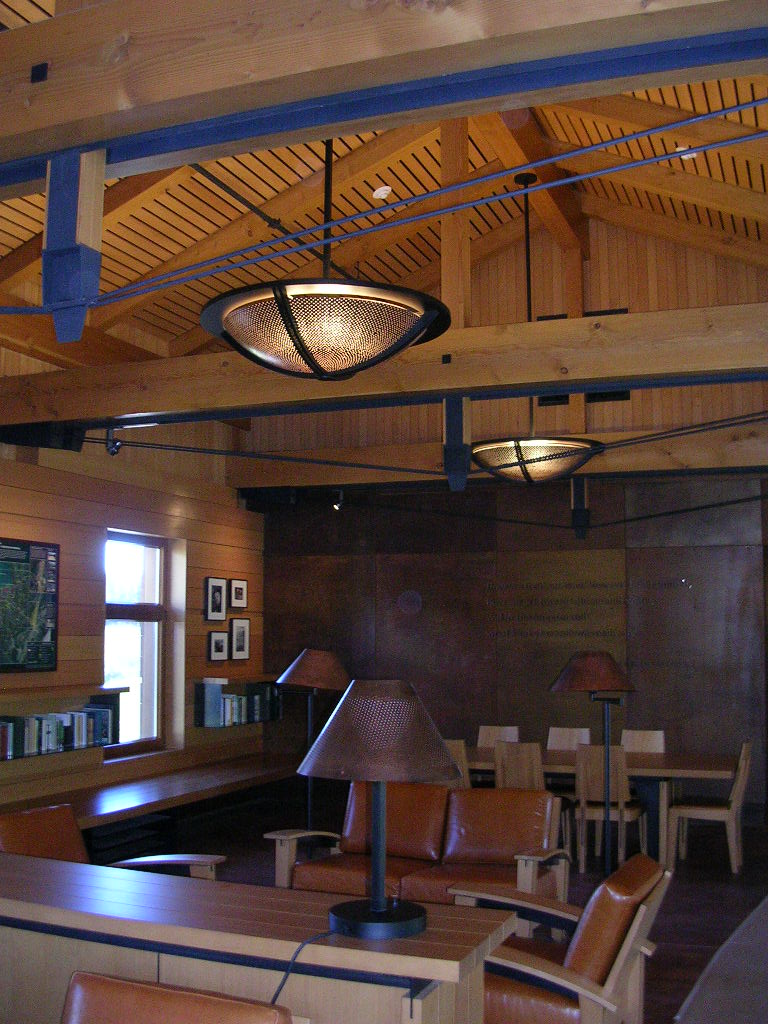
Visitor center reading room

The Laurance S. Rockefeller (LSR) Preserve is a 1,106 acres (448 ha) refuge within Grand Teton National Park on the southern end of Phelps Lake, Wyoming. The site was originally known as the JY Ranch, a dude ranch. Starting in 1927, John D. Rockefeller Jr. purchased much of the land in Jackson Hole for the creation of Jackson Hole National Monument and the expansion of Grand Teton National Park. However, he retained the 3,100-acre (1,300 ha) JY Ranch as a family retreat. Over the years the family gave most of the ranch to the national park. John's son, Laurance S. Rockefeller, began the process of donating the final parcel in 2001; after extensive restoration, the transfer was completed in 2007. The donation came with special preservation and maintenance restrictions, with the vision that the preserve remain a place where visitors can experience a spiritual and emotional connection to the beauty of the lake and the Teton Range.

== JY Ranch ==
The lands that formed the JY Ranch were first homesteaded in 1903 by Dave Spalding. He sold the property in 1906 to Louis Joy, who, with Struthers Burt, converted the property to Jackson Hole's first dude ranch, abbreviating Joy's last name to "JY." The ranch was purchased by the Rockefellers' Snake River Land Company in 1932, becoming a family retreat.

== Natural features ==
The LSR Preserve features several types of natural communities. Sagebrush meadows are relatively dry and are home to a variety of wildflowers and animal species. The preserve's forests are predominantly composed of fir, spruce, and lodgepole pine with intermittent growth of cottonwoods and aspens. Sedges and other low plants grow in the wetlands providing food and cover for migrating birds. Eight miles (13 km) of trails provide public access to these natural communities.

== Innovative project ==
Mr. Rockefeller hoped that his project would serve as a model for the National Parks. The overall plan for the preserve was developed by D. R. Horne & Company with advice regarding user experience from Kevin Coffee Museum Planning. Prerequisite to creating the LSR Preserve, the cabins, stables and other built environment that had been part of the Rockefeller family's presence at the JY Ranch were removed and those sites were carefully bio-remediated with seeds or plantings collected from nearby locations within the site. A nine-mile system of hiking trails lead through sub-alpine and wetland habitat, with vistas along the southern edge of Phelps Lake. The visitor experience is prompted via the 7,573 ft^{2} (703.6 m^{2}) visitor center situated at the lowest elevation of the Preserve. The visitor center building was designed by Carney Architects of Jackson, Wyoming with the Rocky Mountain Institute consulting on energy and daylighting analysis. Hershberger Design prepared the landscape design plan for the visitor center site and trails. A team of designers, cinematographers, photographers, sound recordists, writers and others contributed to the displays inside the visitors center and those efforts are noted on a plaque in the center, which was dedicated on June 21, 2008. The visitor center was the first Leadership in Energy and Environmental Design (LEED) certified property in Wyoming and only the fifty-second Platinum rating in the LEED program. Featuring composting toilets and a 10 kW photovoltaic system, the facility earned all 17 LEED energy points.
