= Fire on the Mountain (1996 film) =

- Directed by: Beth Gage and George Gage
- Production company: First Run Features
- Release date: 1996
- Running time: 72 minutes
- Country: United States
- Language: English

Fire on the Mountain is a 1996 documentary about the 10th Mountain Division of the United States Army. The film chronicles the creation of the division during World War II, their time in Italy, and their post-war lives.

The film follows the division from recruitment by the National Ski Patrol, to its training at Mount Rainier and Camp Hale in Colorado, through its victorious campaigns in Italy and the Mount Belvedere region of Germany. The end of the film shows the careers of 10th Mountain Division veterans. There is a significant amount of vintage footage as well as remembrances from the veterans who were in their seventies and eighties.

Fire on the Mountain premiered at the Sundance Film Festival and won Grand Prize at Mountainfilm in Telluride.

Members of the division in the film include Pete Seibert who founded Vail Ski Resort, David Brower who was the first executive director of the Sierra Club, mountaineer and educator Paul Petzoldt, and co-founder of Nike Bill Bowerman.
