= Glenn Exum =

Premier mountaineer in American climbing history (1911–2000)

Glenn Exum (June 24, 1911 – March 17, 2000) numbers among the premier mountaineers in American climbing history. Exum is best remembered for ascents in the Teton Range in Wyoming.

On July 15, 1931, Exum was the first to climb a new route to the summit of Grand Teton. Today the route is split into the Upper and Lower Exum Ridge Routes. The Exum Ridge remains one of the most popular routes to the summit of Grand Teton.

Along with Paul Petzoldt, he founded what is now Exum Mountain Guides, the oldest Alpine guiding service in the U.S. At the time Exum was a music student at the University of Idaho. He did eventually become a music teacher.

In the mid-1930s Exum went to climb the Alps. The European mountain guides would pull their clients up difficult climbs then lower them down on the descent. Exum thought climbers would appreciate fully participating in ascending the mountain. His philosophy was that "guides should provide instruction, inspire initiative and responsibility, and promote participation" and brought that vision to the guide service company.

In 1955 Petzoldt sold out his part of the company to Exum. In 1978 Exum sold the company to four of the guides.

He climbed the Grand Teton in 1981 on the 50th anniversary ascent of the Exum Ridge.

Exum died on March 17, 2000 at his home in Littleton, Colorado.
