= Paul Petzoldt =

American mountain climber

- Born: January 16, 1908; Creston, Iowa, US
- Died: October 6, 1999 (aged 91); Topsham, Maine, US
- Occupation: Mountaineer
- Known for: Founder of the National Outdoor Leadership School (NOLS); involved in the introduction of Outward Bound to the US

Paul Kiesow Petzoldt (January 16, 1908 – October 6, 1999) was an American mountaineer and wilderness educator known for establishing the National Outdoor Leadership School in 1965.

== Early life ==
Petzoldt was born in Creston, Iowa. The youngest of nine children, he lived on an Iowa homestead but his father, Charles, died in 1911. He left with his mother, Emma, to farm in Idaho. From 1929 to 1932, Petzoldt attended the University of Idaho, the University of Wyoming, and the University of Utah but did not earn a degree.

== Career ==
Along with friend Ralph Herron, he made his first ascent of the Grand Teton in 1924 at the age of 16, likely only the fourth or fifth ascent. Along with Glenn Exum, he founded what is now Exum Mountain Guides, the oldest Alpine guiding service in the U.S. He developed several techniques mountaineers still use such as specific voice signals and a snow-climbing belay system.

In 1931 Petzoldt made the fourth ascent of Exum Ridge in order to create a video documenting the new route. Created by Park Ranger George Waters, it is some of the earliest North American climbing footage in existence.

In 1934 he traversed the Matterhorn, then retraced the route on the same day. He and Dan Bryant, from New Zealand, were the first climbers ever to traverse the Matterhorn twice in one day.

In 1938 he was a member of the first American team to attempt a climb on K2. During the climb he went to 26,000 feet without supplementary oxygen, a record height at the time.

During World War II Petzoldt served in the U.S. Army's 10th Mountain Division, fighting on the Italian Front. He also helped train the ski and mountaineering troops. A documentary, Fire on the Mountain, chronicles the creation of the division, their time in Italy, and their post-war lives.

In 1955 Petzoldt sold his portion of the guide school to Exum.

He testified in favor of the Wilderness Act which created a formal mechanism for designating wilderness. The growing interest in the wilderness paired with little training inspired Petzoldt to create his own school.

From 1963 to 1965, Petzoldt was the chief instructor for Outward Bound Colorado prior to establishing NOLS, the National Outdoor Leadership School. Noted in his introduction to The New Wilderness Handbook, his experience in NOLS, Outward Bound, and love of the wilderness evolved into the Wilderness Education Association. Started in 1977, the courses, certification and knowledge of the WEA are still helping many advocates of the environment learn to have low-impact adventures in the environment.

Petzoldt climbed Grand Teton more than 300 times. His last successful ascent was in 1984. He pioneered numerous, now classic routes in the Tetons, Wind River Range, Sawtooths and in Colombia’s Sierra Nevada de Santa Marta. He died October 6, 1999 in Maine.

== Legacy ==
He was given an honorary doctorate by Kansas State University and by Unity College in Maine. He received the Conservation Award from the Department of Interior for his search of The Tribesman II plane crash on Mount Moran. He received the Banquet of the Golden Plate Award from the American Academy of Achievement.

He was inducted into The Explorers Club. He received the Eddie Bauer Award for conservation. The American Mountain Guides Association honored him as a senior guide.

In January 2026 a Wyoming PBS documentary “A Life Outside: American Mountain Guides” premiered at AlpinFilm festival in Jackson, Wyoming. It highlights the legacy of Petzoldt and follows Exum guides on the Grand Teton and NOLS students in the Wind River Range.

== See also ==
- Ramshorn Dude Ranch Lodge: a National Register of Historic Places property associated with Petzoldt
