= Exum Mountain Guides =

Mountain guide service in US

Coordinates: 43.749268°N 110.725430°W

The Exum Mountain Guides is a mountain guide service based in the U.S. state of Wyoming. The guide service was founded in 1929 by Paul Petzoldt and Glenn Exum as the Exum-Petzoldt School of American Mountaineering. It is the oldest mountain guiding service in North America.

Rather than the way European guides pulled climbers with a rope during difficult sections, the company had the philosophy "that guides should provide instruction, inspire initiative and responsibility, and promote participation." New climbers need to complete Exum's basic rock climbing class before making an ascent. From their base in Grand Teton National Park near Jenny Lake, Exum Mountain Guides provide guided climbing trips throughout the Teton Range and in other nearby mountain ranges. Numerous climbers have worked for the guide service, some who have pioneered new climbing routes on other mountains all over the world.

In 1955 Petzoldt sold out to Exum. In 1978 Exum sold the company to four of the guides:Peter Lev, Al Read, Rod Newcomb and Dean Moore.

They employed about 65 guides in 2025. They claim to have more American Mountain Guides Association certified guides than any other guide service in the US. Exum and Jackson Hole Mountain Guides are the only authorized climbing guides in Grand Teton National Park.

== Notable guides ==
- Willi Unsoeld
- Alex Lowe
- Steve House
- Rolando Garibotti
- Jim Bridwell
- Chuck Pratt
- Jim Donini
