= Steve Roper =

American climber and historian of the Sierra Nevada

Personal information
- Nationality: American
- Born: 1941 (age 84–85)

Climbing career
- Type of climber: Rock climbing

Steve Roper is a noted climber and historian of the Sierra Nevada in the United States. He along with Allen Steck are the founding editors of the Sierra Club journal Ascent.

Roper is the winner of the Sierra Club's Francis P. Farquhar Mountaineering Award for 1983. He is also, with Allen Steck, the recipient of the American Alpine Club's Literary Award (1995).

== Publications ==
- "A Climber's Guide to Yosemite Valley" (1964) LCC # 63-21911
- A Climber's Guide to Pinnacles National Monument (1966), ISBN 0-934641-89-7
- "Climber's Guide to Yosemite Valley" (1971), ISBN 0-87156-048-8
- The Climber's Guide to the High Sierra, (1976), ISBN 0-87156-147-6
- Fifty Classic Climbs of North America, (1979), ISBN 0-87156-292-8
- "Timberline Country: The Sierra High Route" (1982) ISBN 0-87156-298-7
- Sierra High Route: Traversing Timberline Country (1997), ISBN 0-89886-506-9
- Roper, Steve (2004) [1994]. Camp 4: Recollections of a Yosemite Rockclimber. Seattle, WA, USA: The Mountaineers Books. ISBN 0-89886-587-5.

== Publications as editor ==
- Roper, Steve; Allen Steck, eds. (1989). Ascent, Volume V. San Francisco, CA, USA: Sierra Club Books. ISBN 0-87156-701-6.
- Roper, Steve (2003). Ordeal by Piton - Writings from the Golden Age of Yosemite Climbing. Stanford, CA, USA: Stanford University Libraries. ISBN 0-911221-26-3.

== Notable ascents ==
- 1959 North Face of Middle Cathedral Rock, Yosemite Valley, CA (VI 5.9 A4), with Bob Kamps and Chuck Pratt.
- 1963, first free ascent of the Kor-Ingalls Route on Castleton Tower near Moab, Utah, with Chuck Pratt.
- 1963 West Buttress, El Capitan, Yosemite Valley, California. (VI 5.10 A3+) FA with Layton Kor.
- 1963 Third ascent of the El Cap Nose, with Glen Denny and Layton Kor.
- 1966 First one-day ascent of the NW face of Half Dome, with Jeff Foott.
- 1966 Third ascent of the Salathe Wall on El Cap, with Dick Long and Allen Steck.

== See also ==
- Sierra High Route
