= Chuck Pratt =

American rock climber (1939–2000)

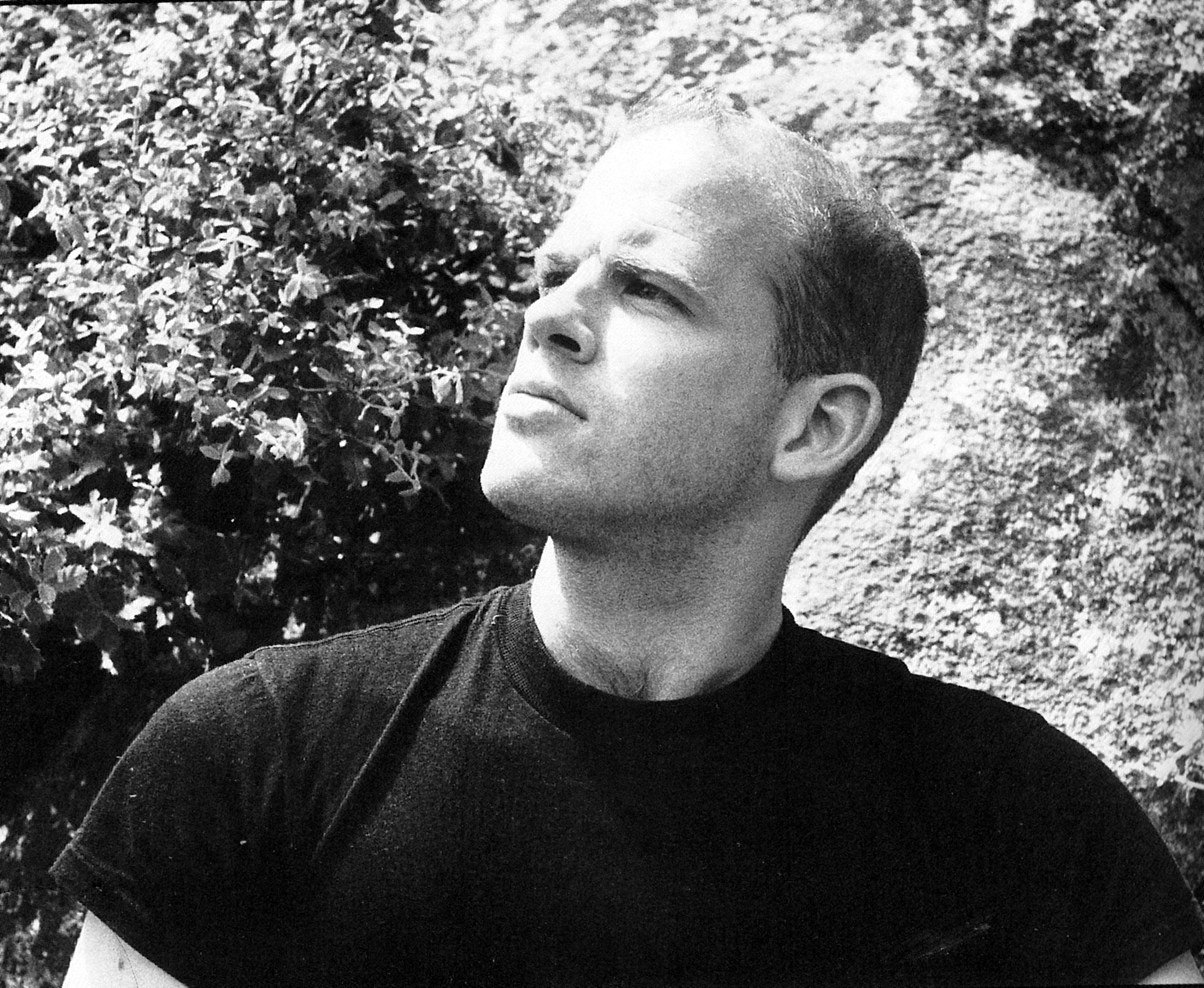
- Pratt in the early 1960s

Personal information
- Born: March 5, 1939 California, US
- Died: December 16, 2000 (aged 61) Thailand

Sport
- Sport: Rock climbing

Charles Marshall Pratt (March 5, 1939 – December 16, 2000) was an American rock climber known for big wall climbing first ascents in Yosemite Valley. He was also a long-time climbing instructor and mountain guide with Exum Mountain Guides in the Grand Tetons.

== Climbing career ==
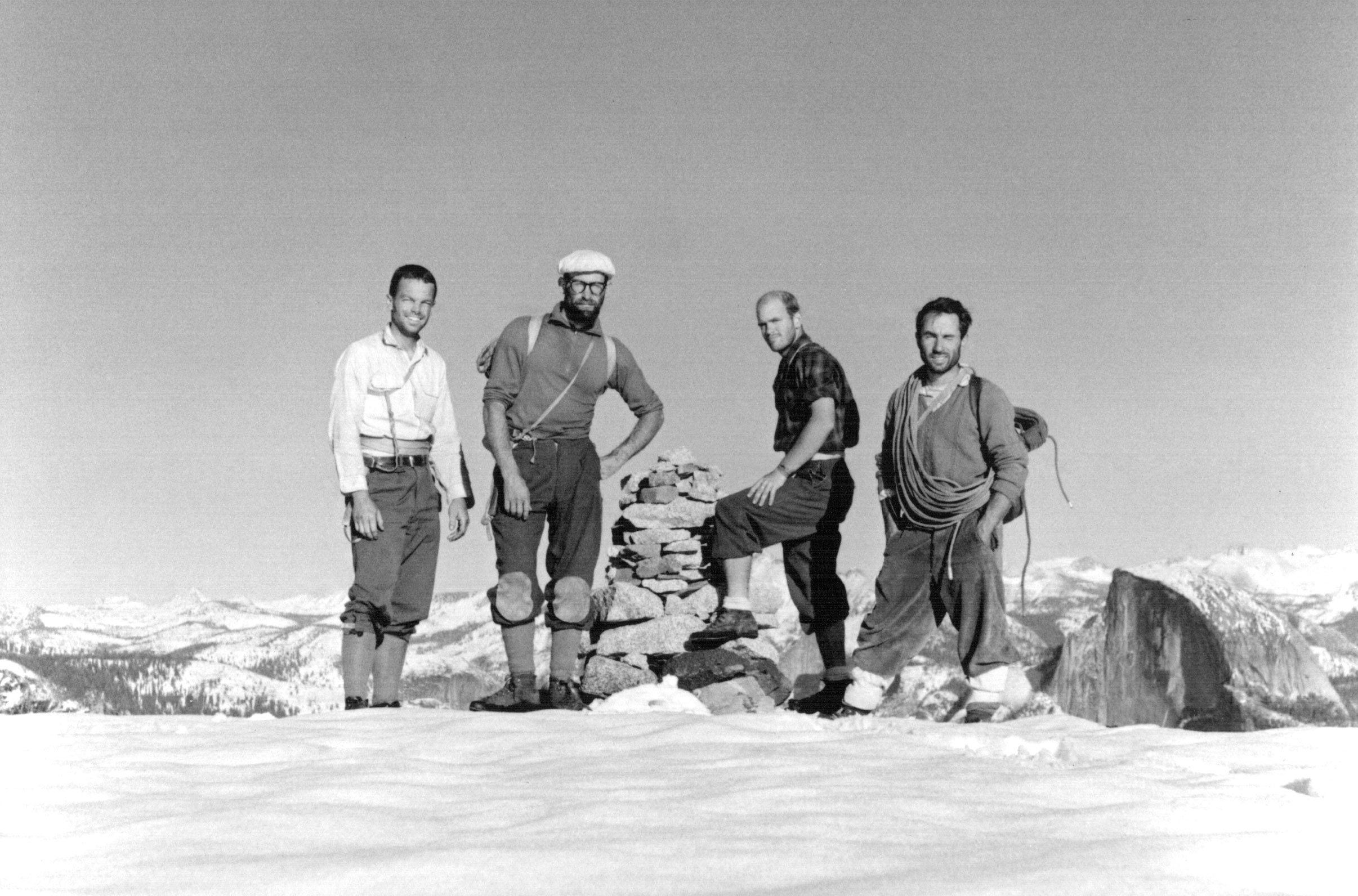
Frost, Robbins, Pratt and Chouinard after the first ascent of the North America Wall on El Capitan in 1964. Photo by Tom Frost.

Chuck Pratt's first experiences were on the scrappy cliffs of Bellingham, Washington's Sehome Hill when he was in high school.

In August, 1958, Pratt completed the first ascent of the north face of Fairview Dome in Tuolumne Meadows in Yosemite National Park with Wally Reed, This climb, completed when Pratt was 19, is described as "marvelously direct" and a "memorable climb" in Fifty Classic Climbs of North America.

In 1959, he completed the first ascent of the East Face of Washington Column (later called 'Astroman') in Yosemite Valley with Warren Harding and Glen Denny.

In 1960, he made the second ascent of The Nose on El Capitan in Yosemite Valley, a route pioneered by Warren Harding in 1958. He climbed with Royal Robbins, Tom Frost and Joe Fitschen, and they made the climb in one continuous push lasting seven days. Robbins said it was "the most magnificent and complete adventure of our lives." The first ascent had taken Harding's team 45 days of climbing spread over an 18-month period.

On September 12, 1961, Tom Frost and Royal Robbins began the first ascent of the Salathé Wall on El Capitan, named for pioneer Yosemite climber John Salathé. Pratt was purchasing additional climbing equipment for the ascent during those first few days. Frost and Robbins spent two days establishing the first 600 feet (183 m) of the route, and then retreated to the valley floor, where they met up with Pratt, with whom they spent several more days pushing the route to 1,000 feet (305 m) above the valley floor. Once again, the climbers descended and resupplied. On September 19, they resumed the climb, and after days of intense vertical aid climbing they reached and surpassed "The Roof", a 15-foot (4.6 m) overhang. On September 24, the trio reached the summit. It had taken them a total of 11 days and 36 pitches of vertical climbing to finish the route, which is rated YDS VI, 5.10, A3.

In October, 1963, he made the first free ascent of the Kor-Ingalls Route on Castleton Tower near Moab, Utah, with Steve Roper.

In the summer of 1964, Pratt, Harding and Yvon Chouinard spent five days in an alpine-style ascent of the South Face of Mount Watkins, located up Tenaya Canyon, a side canyon of Yosemite Valley. The climb was completed in extreme heat with limited water supplies, leading to dehydration of the three climbers. Pratt wrote in the 1965 American Alpine Journal: "By the fourth day, Yvon had lost so much weight from dehydration that he could lower his climbing knickers without undoing a single button. For the first time in seven years, I was able to remove a ring from my finger, and Harding, whose resemblance to the classical conception of Satan is legendary, took on an even more gaunt and sinister appearance."

From October 22–31, 1964, with Robbins, Frost and Chouinard, Pratt made the first ascent of the North America Wall on El Capitan, YDS VI, 5.8, A5. Robbins described this climb in the 1965 American Alpine Journal: "The nine-day first ascent of the North America Wall in 1964 not only was the first one-push first ascent of an El Capitan climb, but a major breakthrough in other ways. We learned that our minds and bodies never stopped adjusting to the situation. We were able to live and work and sleep in comparative comfort in a vertical environment." Of this climb, Chris Jones wrote, "For the first time in the history of the sport, Americans lead the world."

In 1965 he made the first ascent of Entrance Exam (II 5.9) on Arch Rock in Yosemite Valley with Jim Bridwell, Chris Fredericks and Larry Marshik. That same year, along with Fredericks, he made the first ascent of Twilight Zone (5.10d), in the Cookie Cliff area, still regarded nearly half a century later as a difficult classic Yosemite Valley route.

== Legacy ==
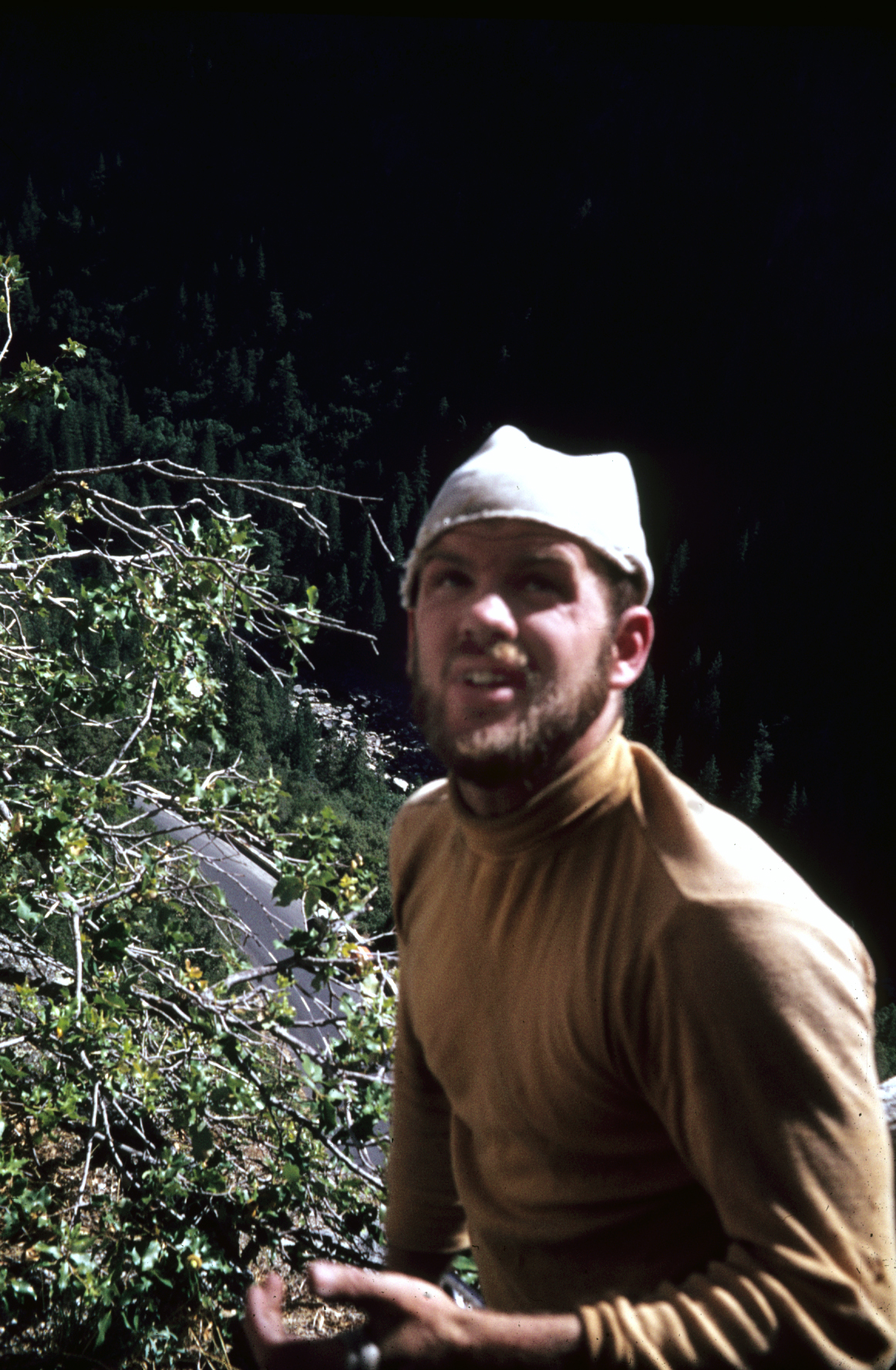
Chuck Pratt in Yosemite Valley in 1968

According to his friend John Martin Meek, Pratt had an "almost obsessive avoidance of photos and publicity." Fellow Exum guide Dick Dorworth described him as "inherently shy".

Meek quoted Royal Robbins as saying that "He enjoys severe climbs and easy ones, and will repeat a route many times if he likes it." One of Pratt's favorites was the Durrance Route on Devils Tower, which he climbed annually with Meek for a number of years.

In his obituary of Pratt, Royal Robbins called him "The best climber of our generation, and the best climbing writer as well". Pratt's reputation as a writer was based on two published essays, The South Face of Mt. Watkins in 1965 and The View From Dead Horse Point, published in the Sierra Club mountaineering journal Ascent in 1970. Pratt stopped writing for publication at that point. Robbins summarized Pratt's attitude toward climbing: "Pratt, more than perhaps anyone I have known, has always climbed, first and foremost, and last and finally, for the climbing experience itself, for the rewards that come directly from the dance of man and rock."

== Personal life ==
Pratt died of a heart attack in his sleep in Sang Khom, Thailand, where he had spent several winters in the last years of his life. His ashes were scattered in the Mekong River.

== Notable climbs ==
- 1959 North Face of Middle Cathedral Rock, Yosemite Valley, CA (VI 5.9 A4), with Bob Kamps and Steve Roper.
- 1964 North American Wall, El Capitan, Yosemite Valley - (VI 5.8 A5 3000') - First Ascent with Royal Robbins, Tom Frost and Yvon Chouinard.
