= Mount Watkins (California) =

Mountain in California, United States

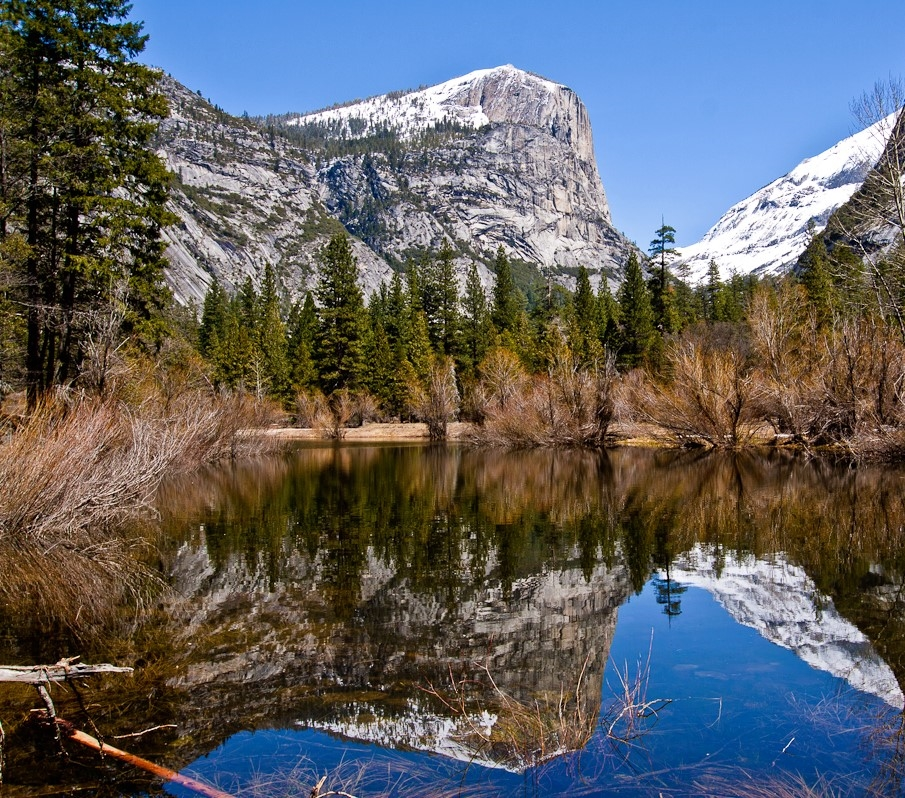
- Southwest aspect reflected in Mirror Lake

Highest point
- Elevation: 8,497 ft (2,590 m)
- Prominence: 266 ft (81 m)
- Parent peak: Mount Hoffmann (10,855 ft)
- Isolation: 1.86 mi (2.99 km)
- Coordinates: 37°46′58″N 119°31′04″W

Naming
- Etymology: Carleton Watkins

Geography
- Location within California Location within the United States
- Country: United States
- State: California
- County: Mariposa
- Protected area: Yosemite National Park
- Parent range: Sierra Nevada
- Topo map: USGS Yosemite Falls

Geology
- Rock age: Cretaceous
- Mountain type: Fault block
- Rock type: Granodiorite

Climbing
- Easiest route: class 2

Mount Watkins is an 8,497-foot-elevation (2,590-meter) mountain summit in the Sierra Nevada mountain range, in Mariposa County, California, United States.

== Description ==
Mount Watkins is located in Yosemite National Park, 2.72 miles (4.38 km) north of Half Dome, and 1.86 miles (2.99 km) northwest of Clouds Rest. Precipitation runoff from this mountain drains into Tenaya Creek which is a tributary of the Merced River. Topographic relief is significant as the summit rises 2,700 feet (823 meters) above Tenaya Canyon in less than one mile (1.6 km). The mountain is composed of Half Dome Granodiorite which formed during the Cretaceous period. An ascent of the summit involves 7.4 miles of hiking (round-trip) with 750 feet of elevation gain, and the months of June through October offer the best conditions. The approach is via the Snow Creek Trail starting near Olmsted Point.

== History ==
The mountain is named after Carleton Watkins (1829–1916), an American photographer in the 1800s whose photographs of Yosemite significantly influenced the United States Congress' decision to preserve it as a National Park. His photograph of Mount Watkins reflected in Mirror Lake was especially popular, and likely led to his name being affixed to this mountain. This mountain's toponym was officially adopted on June 30, 1932, by the U.S. Board on Geographic Names, although it was featured in publications as early as 1871. The Native American name for the mountain is "Waijau" which means Pine Mountain.

== Climbing ==
Along with El Capitan and Half Dome, Mount Watkins is one of the three main big walls in Yosemite for rock climbing.

Rock climbing routes:

- South Face - class 5.11 - First ascent July 1964 - Warren Harding, Chuck Pratt, Yvon Chouinard
- Teabag Wisdom - class 5.11 - FA 2016 - Vitaliy Musiyenko, Chris Koppl
- The Twisted Road - class 5.12

== Climate ==
According to the Köppen climate classification system, Mount Watkins is located in an alpine climate zone. Most weather fronts originate in the Pacific Ocean and travel east toward the Sierra Nevada mountains. As fronts approach, they are forced upward by the peaks (orographic lift), causing them to drop their moisture in the form of rain or snowfall onto the range.

== See also ==
- Geology of the Yosemite area

== Gallery ==
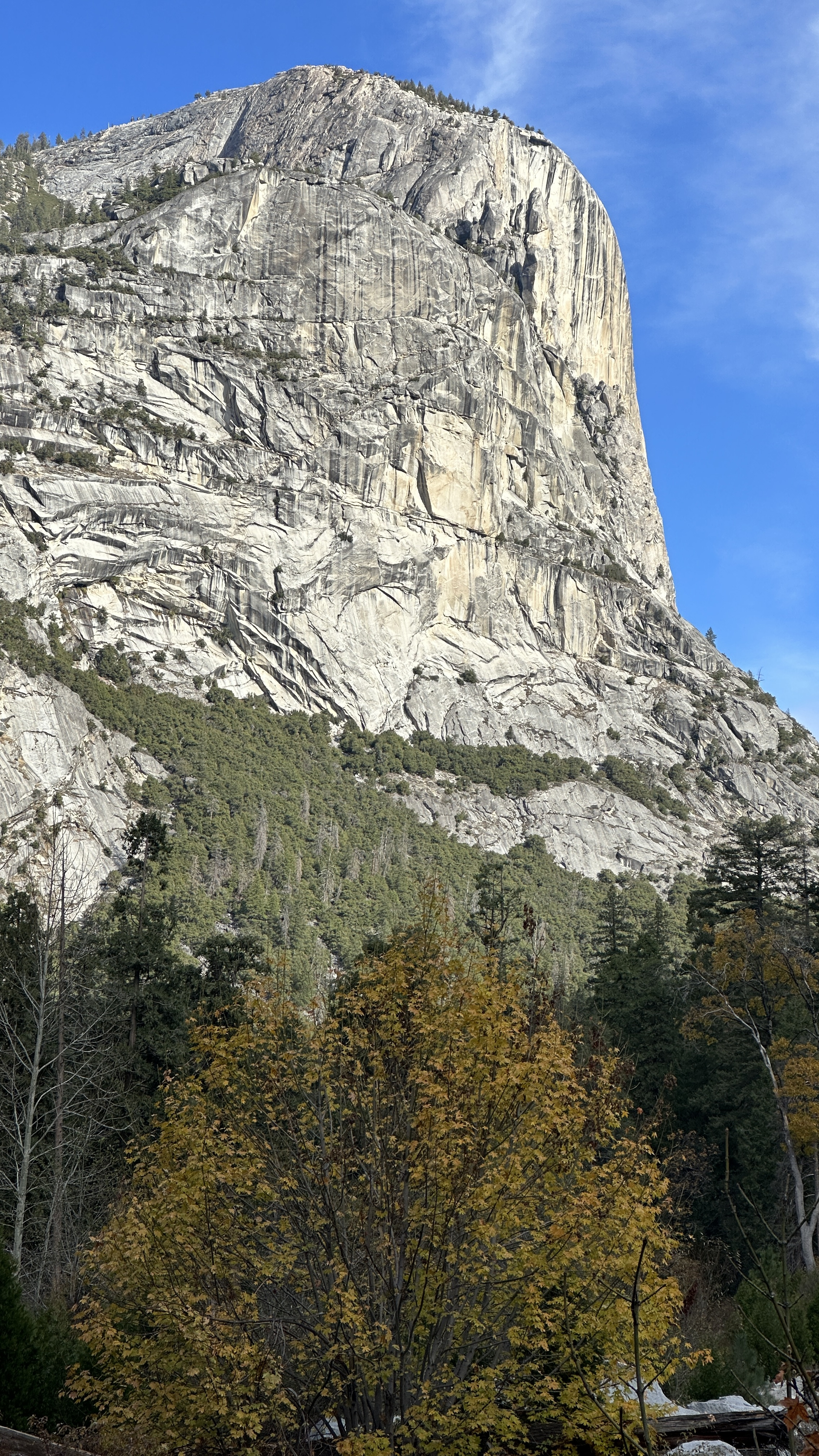
Southwest aspect

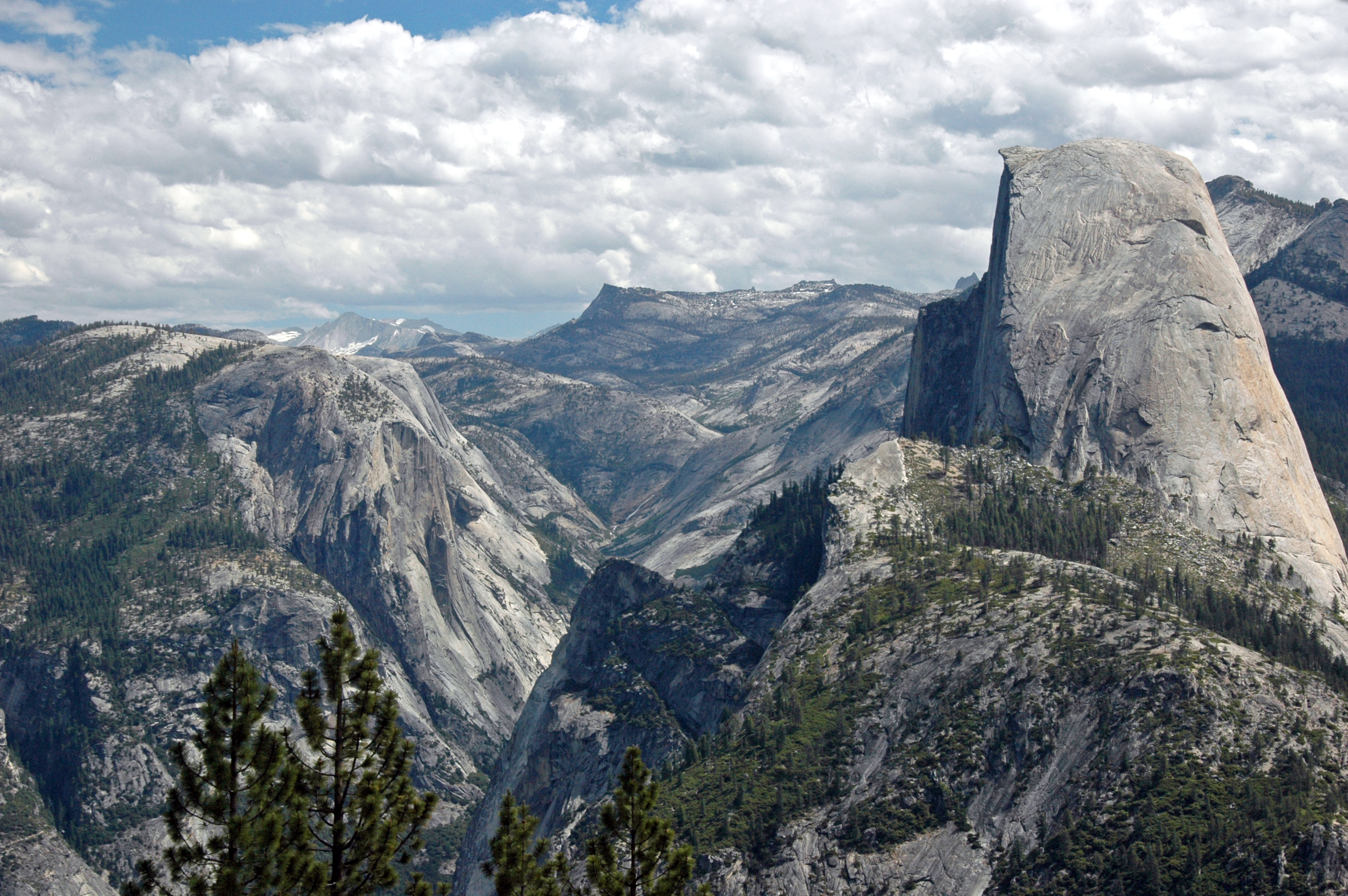
Mount Watkins (left), Half Dome (right)

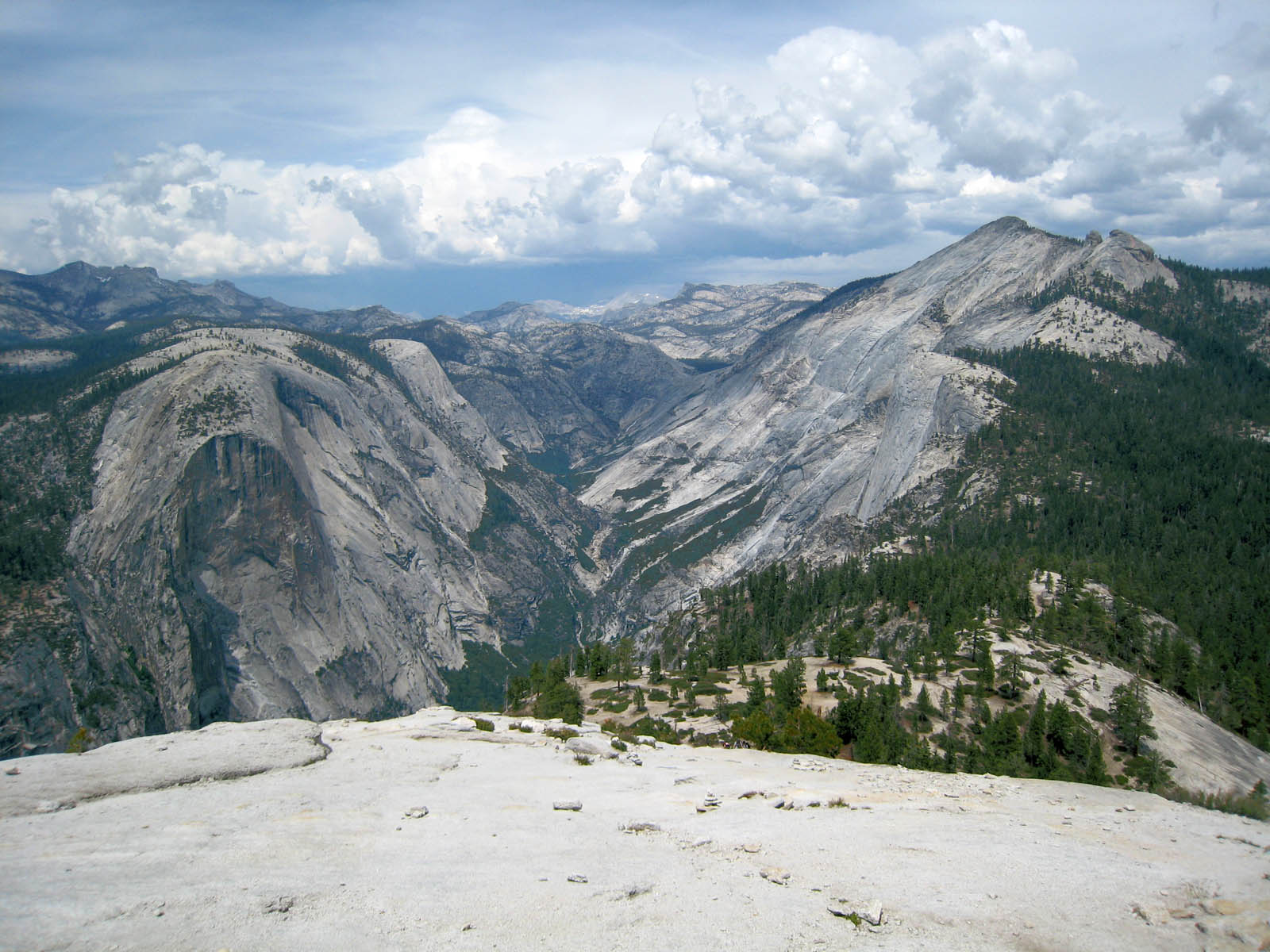
Mount Watkins (left), Clouds Rest (right), viewed from Half Dome

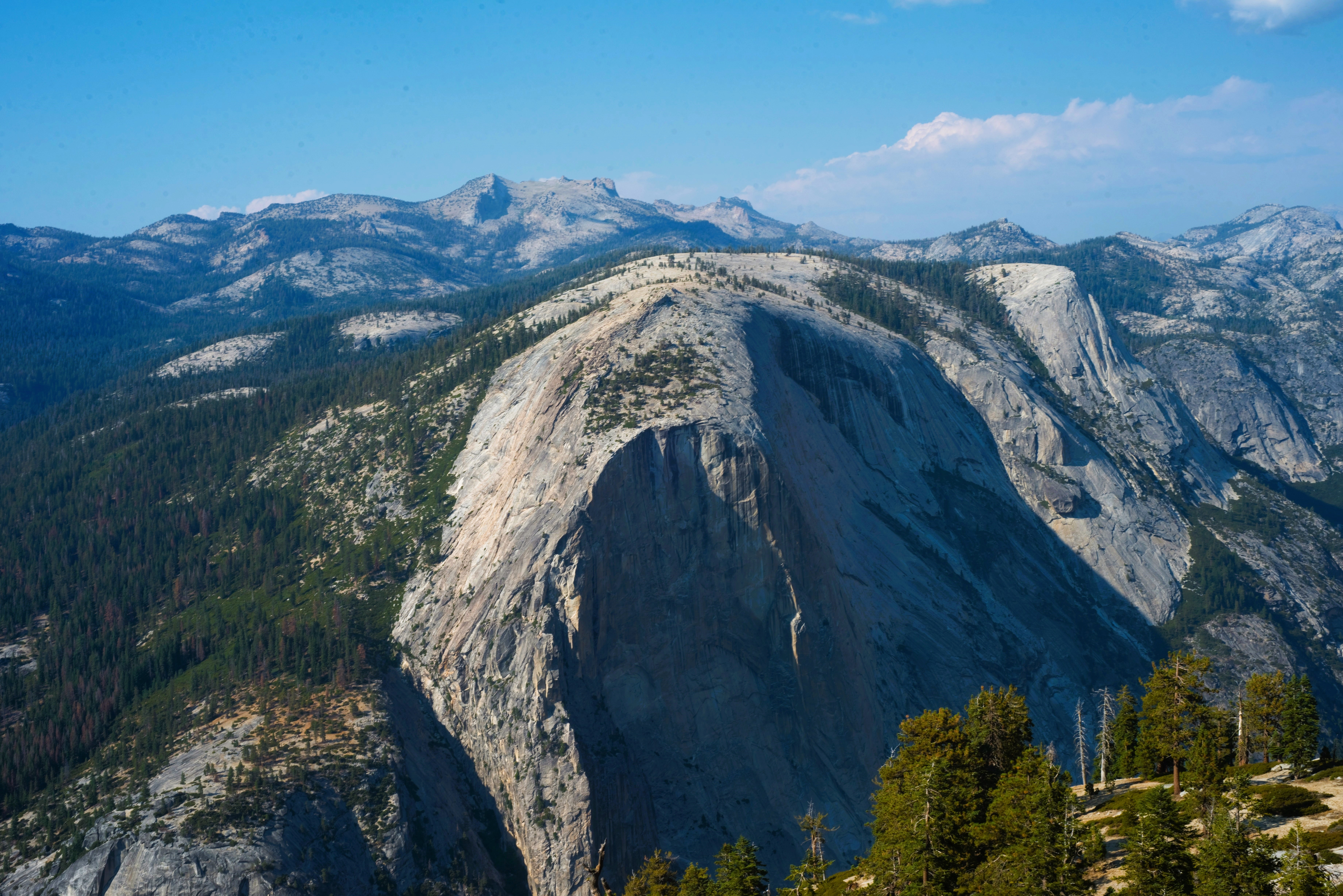
Mount Watkins viewed from Half Dome.
(line parent Mount Hoffmann on the horizon)

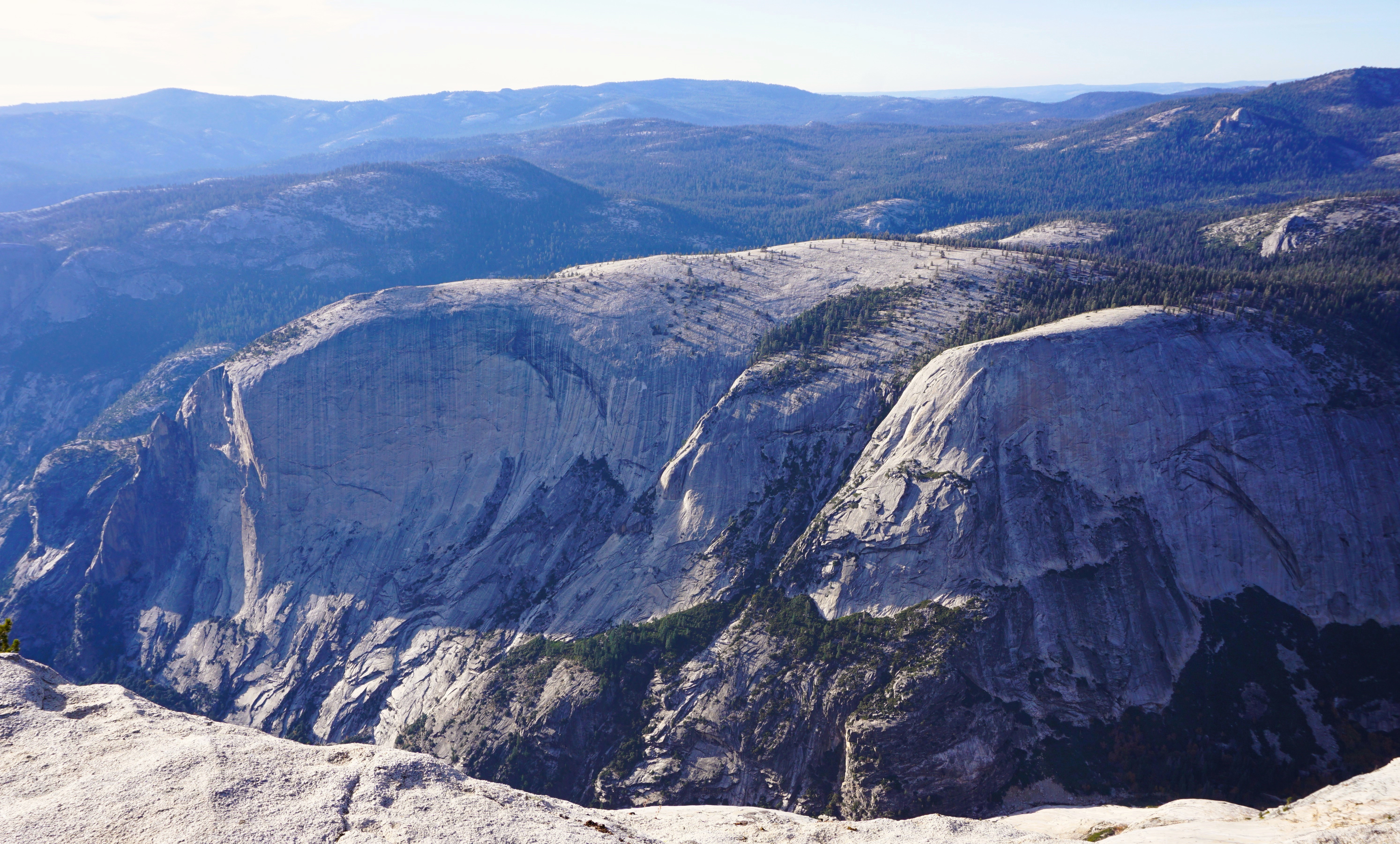
Mount Watkins viewed from Clouds Rest

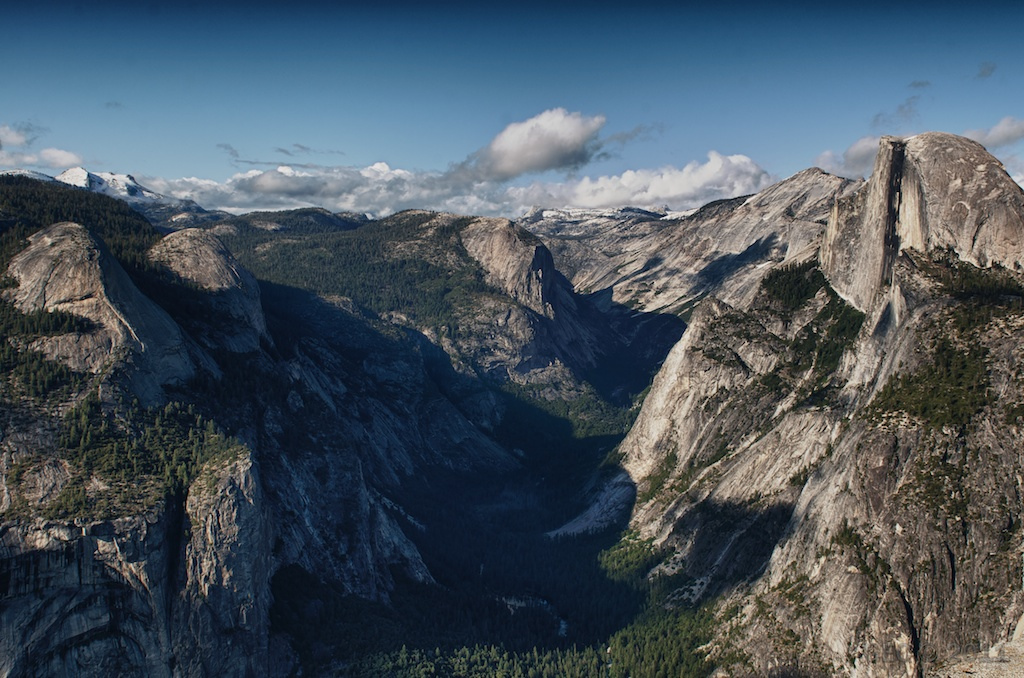
Mount Watkins (centered) viewed from Glacier Point. (Half Dome to right)

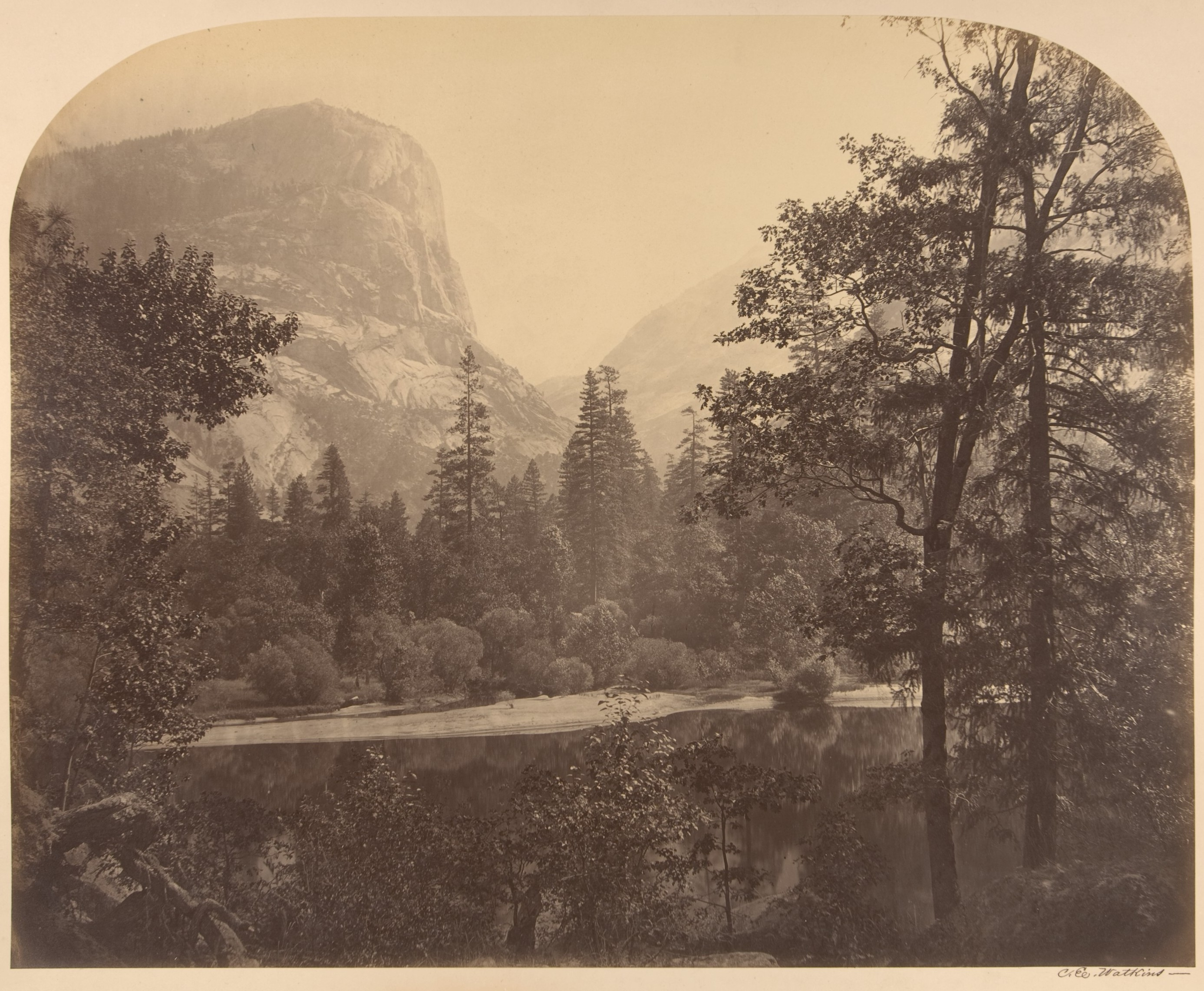
Mount Watkins photographed in 1861 by namesake Carleton Watkins

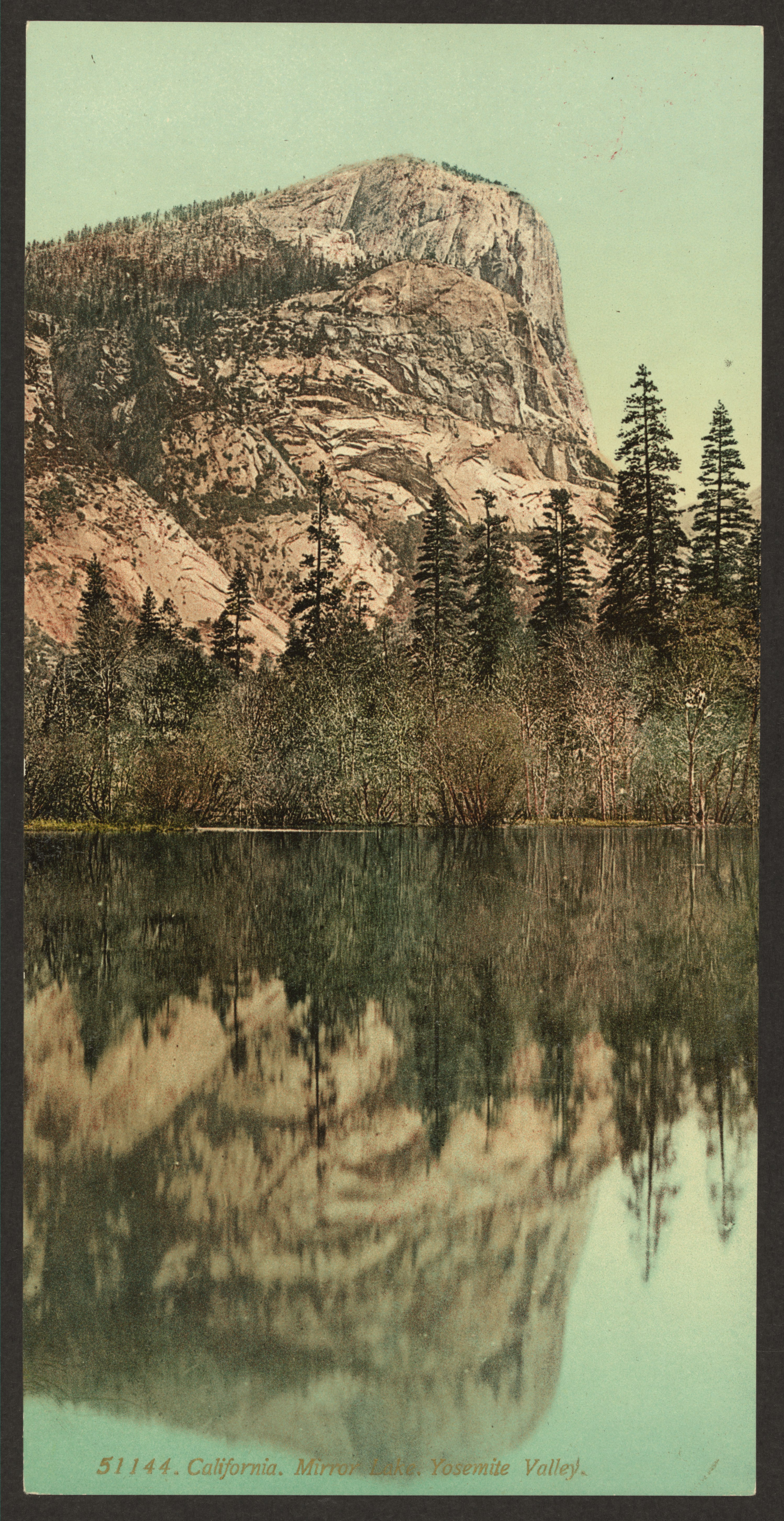
Watkins reflected in Mirror Lake, early 1900s

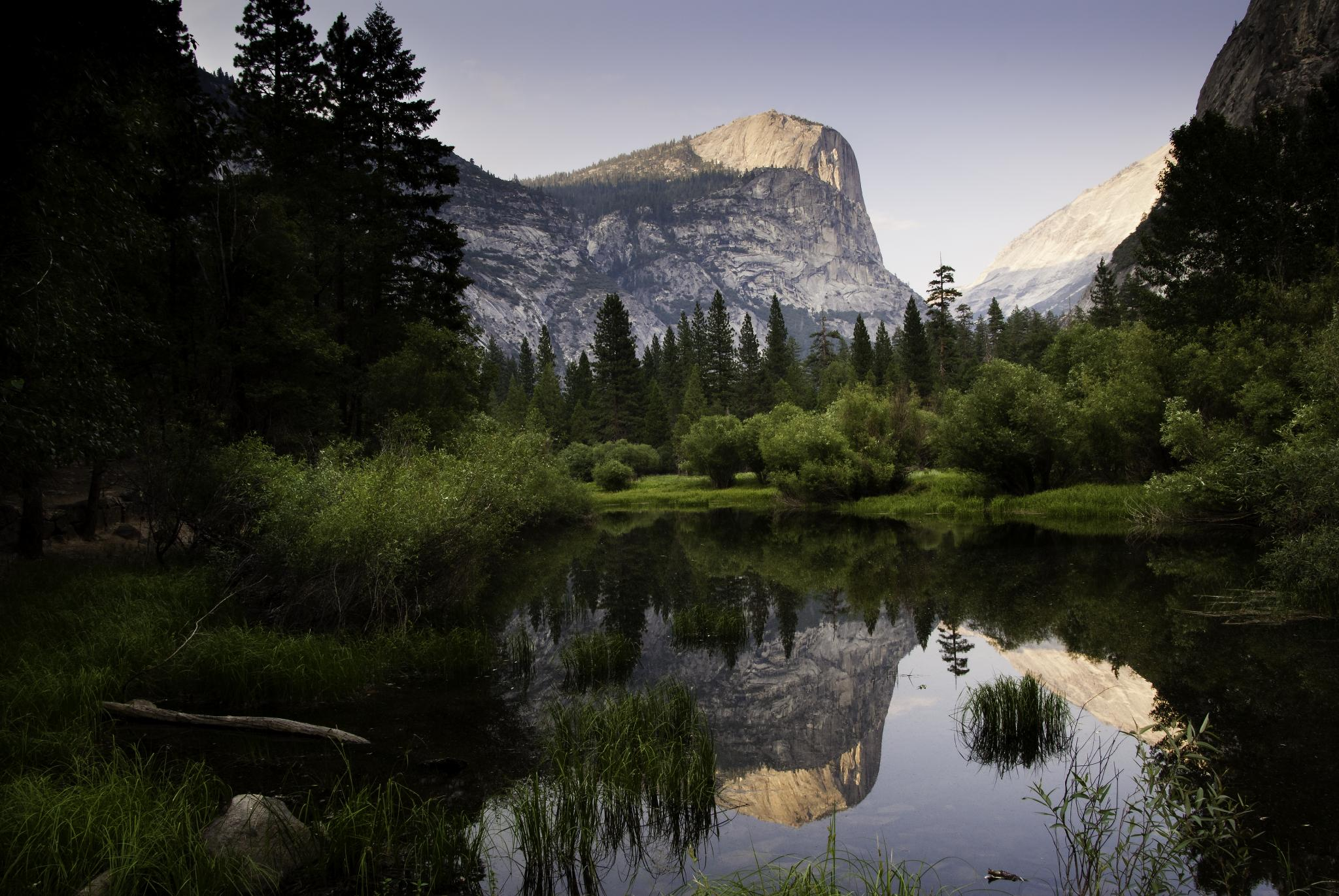
Watkins reflected in Mirror Lake

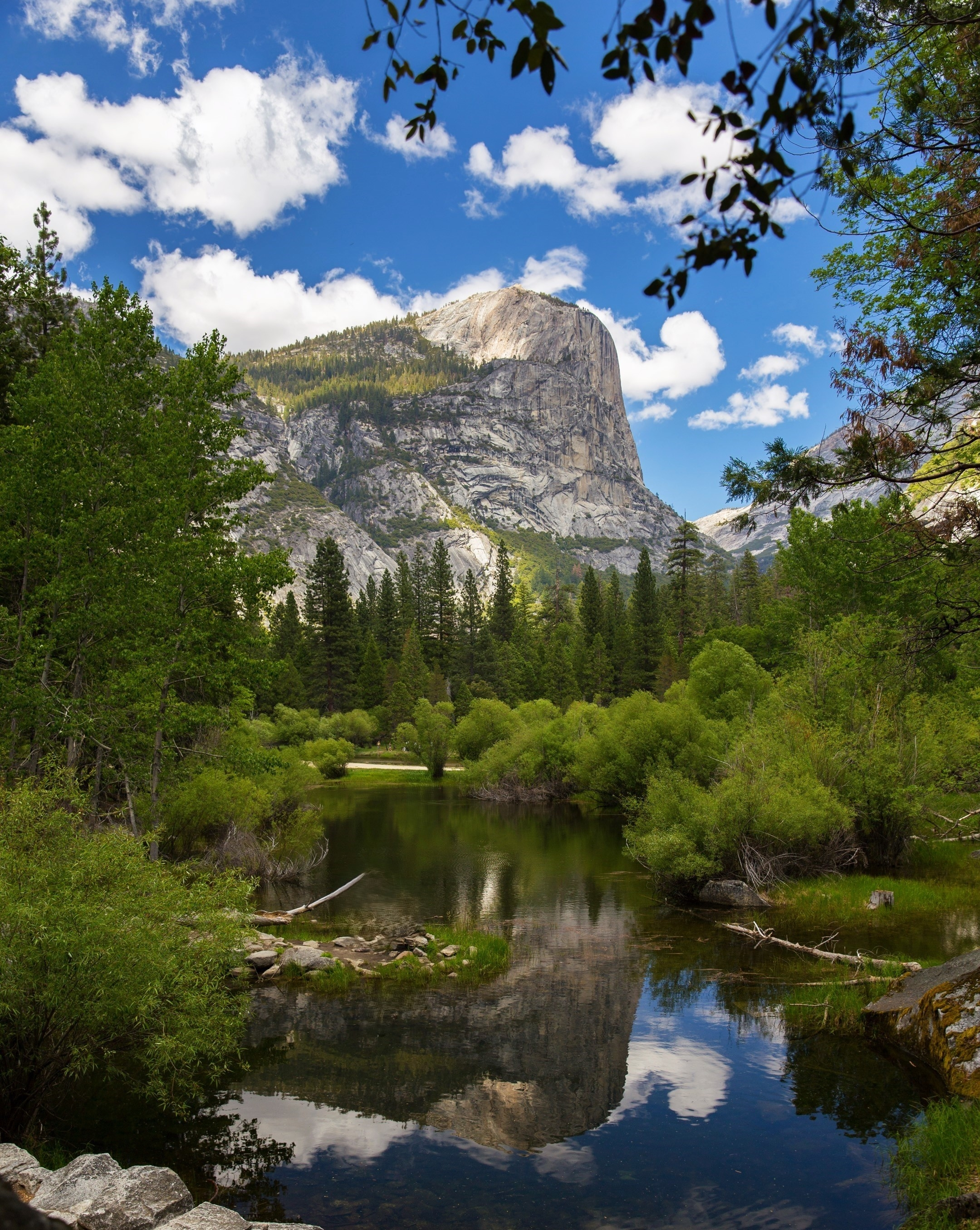
Watkins reflected in Mirror Lake

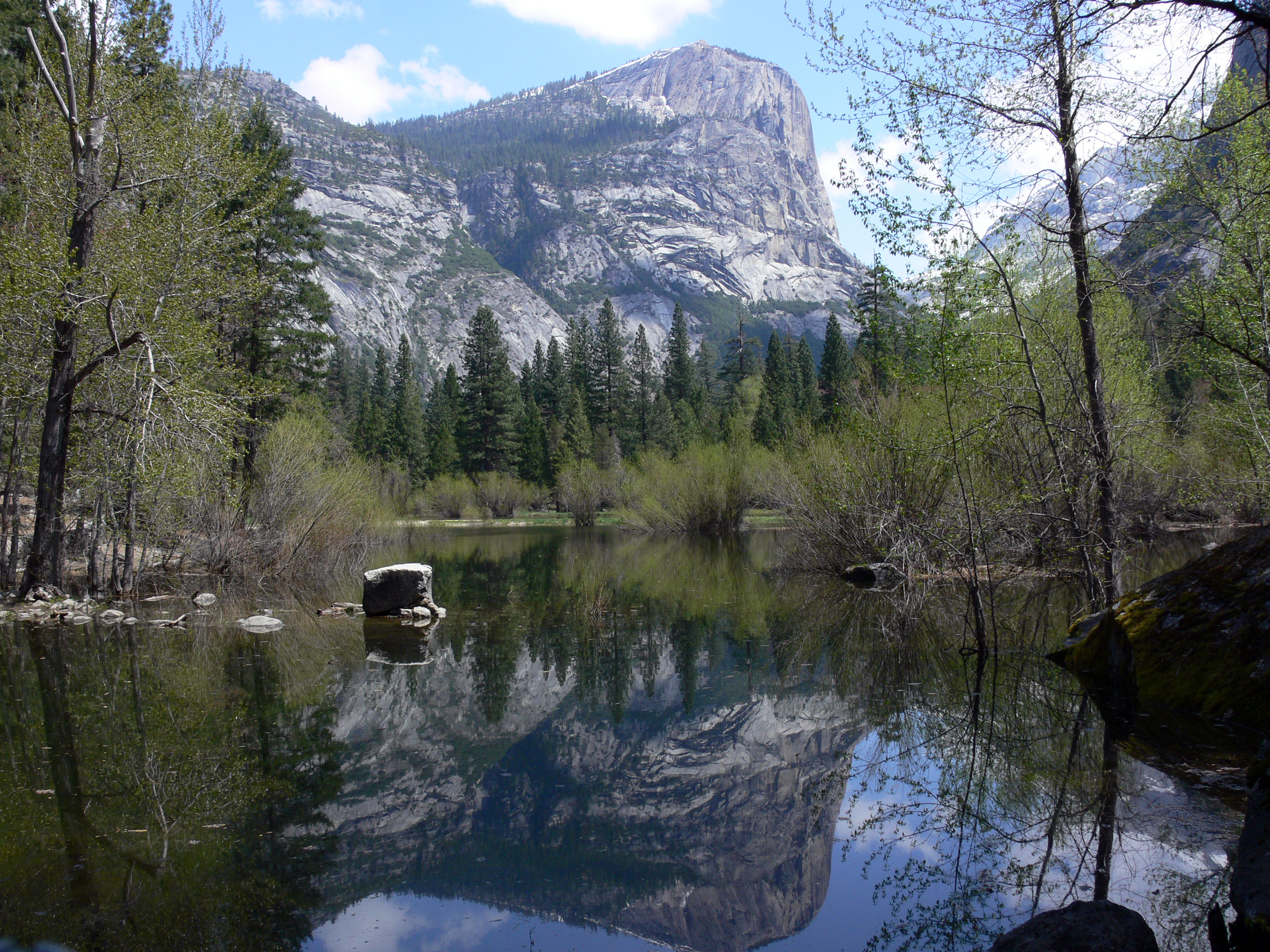
Watkins reflected in Mirror Lake

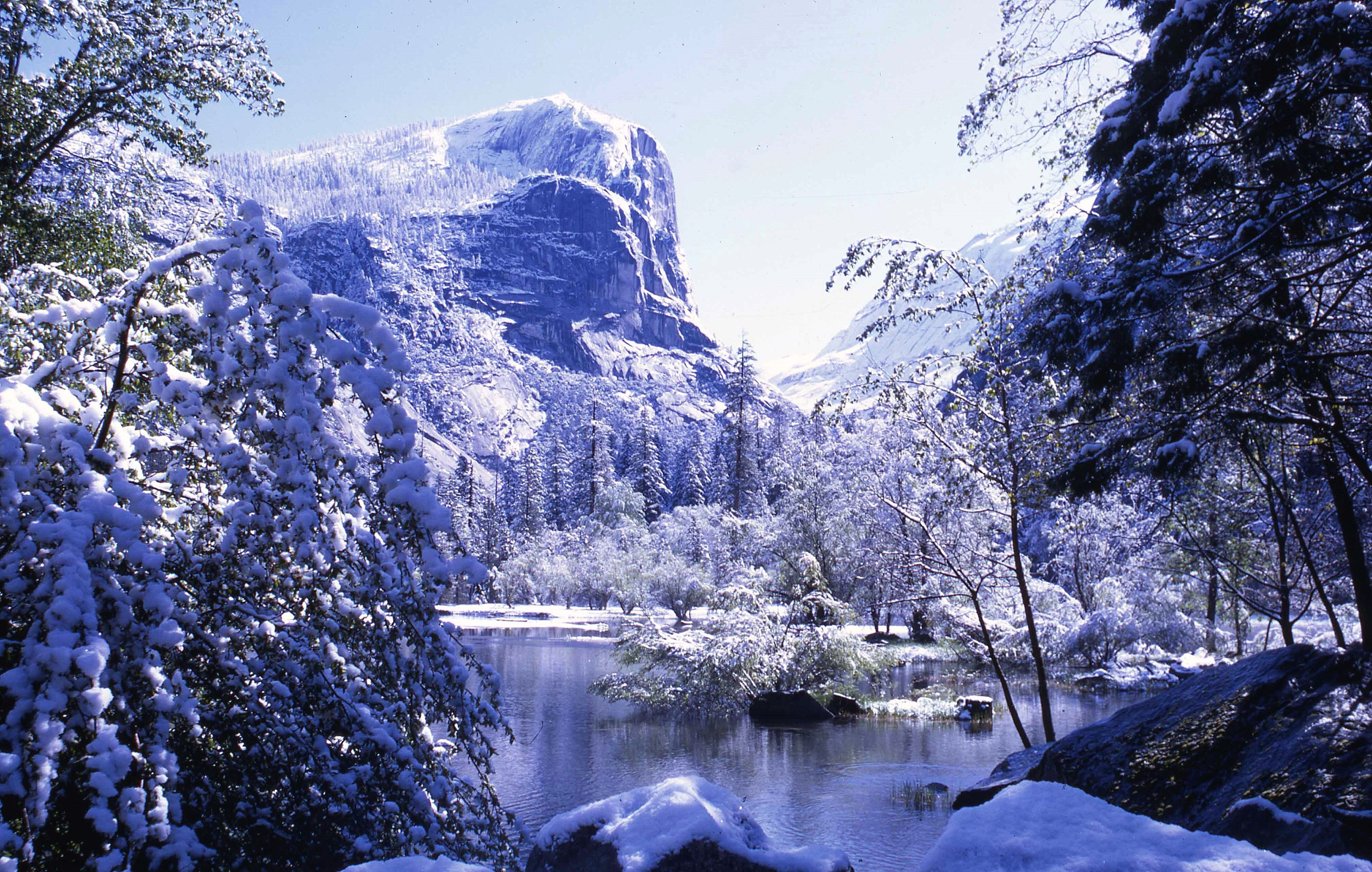
Winter snow on Mt. Watkins
