= Warren Harding (climber) =

American rock climber (1924–2002)

- Harding on the last pitch of the Dawn Wall, El Capitan. Yosemite Valley. 1970.

Personal information
- Nickname: Batso
- Born: June 18, 1924
- Died: February 27, 2002 (aged 77)
- Occupation: Rock climber

Climbing career
- Type of climber: Big wall climbing; Aid climbing; Traditional climbing
- First ascents: The Nose (1957/58); The Wall of Early Morning Light (1970)
- Known for: First ascent of The Nose; Numerous first ascents of big wall aid routes on El Capitan

Warren Harding (June 18, 1924 – February 27, 2002) was an American rock climber. He was the leader of the first team to climb El Capitan, Yosemite Valley, in 1958. Harding made many first ascents in Yosemite, some 28 in all, including The Wall of Early Morning Light (later The Dawn Wall).

He was nicknamed "Batso", a reference to his penchant for spending days living on vertical cliffs and his exuberant and iconoclastic nature. Harding developed specialized equipment for climbing big walls, such as the "bat tent" for sleeping, and "bat hooks" used to hook precariously on small cut-out bits of granite—examples of his B.A.T. or 'Basically Absurd Technology' products.

Harding authored the book Downward Bound: A Mad! Guide to Rock Climbing. The book contains a description of the ascent of the Nose and the Wall of Early Morning Light (1970), as well as instructions in climbing basics, ratings of prominent climbers of the period and a humorous account of rock climbing controversies and lifestyles of the 1960s and 1970s.

== Youth ==
Harding was raised in Downieville, California, in the northern part of the historic gold country near Lake Tahoe by a family from Iowa that had arrived before the Great Depression. Harding grew up entertaining himself, preferring hiking to fishing, after he realized that he was a "terrible fisherman". He began mountaineering in the Sierra Nevada in the late 1940s on Mount Whitney, the Palisades, and the Minarets. He took up technical climbing in 1953; it was, he said, the first thing he was ever really good at because he "could do only what required brute stupidity".

Within a year, Harding was an active figure in the nascent climbing community of Yosemite Valley, a huge glacial valley in which big-wall or multi-day vertical technical or roped rock climbing developed in the United States after World War II. He began pushing the limits of the sport in the 1950s He quickly became one of the "stone masters" of his day.

The hardest climb of the era, the Lost Arrow Spire Chimney, has a dark and difficult pitch named for his lead: the "Harding Hole". He scrabbled his way up a demanding fissure called the "Worst Error" on Elephant Rock, an early effort which the British Guardian journalist Jim Perrin notes, "bears comparison with the achievements of Joe Brown and Don Whillans", famed contemporaries of his in Britain. He pioneered a famous one-day climb up the East Buttress of Middle Cathedral Rock, which today is one of the most-climbed routes in Yosemite Valley.

Harding's first major rock climb was the North Buttress of Middle Cathedral Rock in Yosemite. It started with a stranger who Harding thought was "nuttier than a fruitcake" He and Frank Tarver joined up with another group since one group had ability, but lacked equipment and the other had equipment, but lacked ability. Together, after four nights, and twenty or more rope lengths of climbing, the group made the top of the long and complicated route. To their surprise, they had just finished the longest roped rock climb to date in North America.

Success for Harding in the establishment world, however, was always out of reach. The draft board rejected him due to his heart murmur, and after working as a propeller mechanic during World War II, he trained as a land surveyor, proudly holding a union card his whole life. Harding was known for his short stature and high voice, his hard drinking and fast cars, his black greaser-style hairdo, good looks, and his lascivious inclination. He recounts in his memoir, Downward Bound, that he chose the book's title because it reflected the failure of his career as a responsible wage-earner in the face of his urge to go rock climbing.

== The Nose ==
Within the year, Harding was teaming up with Mark Powell, one of the premier Yosemite climbers of the 1950s. After Harding had been part of a group which failed to climb the vertical Northwest face of Half Dome, he and Powell found themselves in the Valley too late to make the first ascent of that feature, as another group led by Harding's southern Californian rival, Royal Robbins, had just completed it.

Harding recounted meeting the group at the top: "My congratulations were hearty and sincere, but inside, the ambitious dreamer in me was troubled." He, Powell, and equipment inventor Bill 'Dolt' Feuerer, later conspired: "In the fit of egotistical pique, we grumbled around the Valley for a couple of days, trying to figure out what to do. The solution was simple; any climb less than Half Dome was beneath us; only a great climb would do." At this point, as big wall historian Doug Scott notes, Harding was truly exceptional. The 3,000-foot (910 m) face of El Capitan was so 'appallingly higher' than all the other features in Yosemite, it was 'ignored by the majority of climbers'.

In July 1957, Harding, Powell, and Feuerer began their ascent. Unlike the single-push 'alpine' style used on Half Dome, they chose to fix lines between 'camps' in the style used in the Himalaya. Attempting to reach halfway on the first push, they were foiled by the hand sized and larger cracks. Frank Tarver cut the legs off of several wood stoves, and gave the team these "prototype bong pitons". These crack systems, later became world famous as the "Stove Legs Cracks".

Compelled by the National Park Service to stop until after Labor Day due to the crowds forming in El Capitan meadows, the team had a major setback when Powell suffered a compound leg fracture. Powell dropped out, and because of this, Feuerer became disillusioned. Harding, true to his legendary endurance and willingness to find new partners, continued as he later put it, 'with whatever "qualified" climbers I could con into this rather unpromising venture.' Feuerer stayed on as technical advisor, even constructing a bicycle wheeled 'cart' which could be hauled up to the half-way ledge. It bears his name today: 'Dolt Tower'. Nevertheless, Wayne Merry, George Whitmore, and Rich Calderwood now became the main team, with Merry sharing lead chores with Harding.

In the autumn, two more pushes got them to the 2,000-foot (610 m) level. Finally, a fourth push starting in the late fall would likely be the last. The team had originally fixed their route with 1/2-inch (13 mm) manila lines; and their in situ lines would have weakened more over the winter. In the cooling November environment, they worked their way slowly upward, with the seven days it took to push to within the last 300 feet blurring into a 'monotonous grind.' Harding added, if 'living and working 2500 feet above the ground on a granite face' could be considered 'monotonous'.

After sitting out a storm for three days at this level, they hammered their way up the final portion. Harding struggled fifteen hours and placed 28 expansion bolts by hand through the night up an overhanging headwall, topping out at 6 AM. The whole thing had taken 45 days, with more than 3,400 feet (1,000 m) of climbing including huge 'pendulum' swings across the face; and uncounted 'mileage' of laboriously hauling bags with prusik knots up ropes and sliding by 'rappelling' back down.

The team had finished, what is by any standard, one of the 'great classics' of modern rock climbing. The Nose Route is often called the most famous rock climbing route in North America, and in good fall weather can have anywhere between three to ten different parties strung out along its thirty rope lengths to the top. On the 50th anniversary of the ascent, the US House of Representatives passed a resolution honoring the achievement of the original party.

== Later climbs and controversies ==
Following his ascent of El Capitan, Harding established several notable climbing routes in Yosemite, often with photographer Glen Denny. These included the overhanging East Face of Washington Column, later known as "Astroman," after it was free climbed without aid, the Leaning Tower route in Yosemite; and the North face of the Rostrum outside Yosemite Valley. He also participated in the ascent of the 2,500-foot (760 m) face of Mount Watkins with Yvon Chouinard and Chuck Pratt. Writing in the American Alpine Journal in 1965, Pratt described the physical effects of dehydration experienced by the climbers during the Mount Watkins ascent, noting the demanding conditions encountered on the route.

Harding also pioneered big wall ascents in the Sierra Nevada, with routes such as the 2,000-foot (610 m) face of the more than 14,000-foot (4,300 m) Keeler Needle on the side of Mount Whitney and the Southwest Face of Mount Conness in the Yosemite high country.

Harding and climber-photographer Galen Rowell nearly succumbed to a storm on the difficult and tedious, but strikingly beautiful, South Face of Half Dome in 1970. After a rescue and later difficulties, one partner, Joe Faint, abandoned the project. Rowell recounted his worries when Harding didn't show up one weekend: "The next weekend, as we hike up the steep trail to Half Dome, I stop feeling sorry for Warren when he limps past me with a huge pack. Half of Warren is still twice the average man." Unsuccessful and unpleasant jaunts working as a contractor in Vietnam and a serious accident—a truck hit him while working at a construction site, leaving him permanently disabled—did not stop Harding from returning and finishing the climb.

Harding also made a much-publicized first ascent of the "Wall of the Early Morning Light", up the tallest portion of El Capitan on its southeast side. With Dean Caldwell, he spent 27 nights on the wall, living mostly in tented hammocks designed in coordination with Roger Derryberry. When a four day storm rolled in, the National Park Service decided, after 22 days, that the two needed to be rescued. Ropes were lowered, but after much shouting back and forth, retracted. Harding, in his book Downward Bound, recounts what might have happened had the rescue persisted:

"Good Evening! What can we do for you."
"We've come to rescue you!"
"Really? Come now, get hold of yourselves - have some wine."

Harding is the most notorious tippler in the history of modern rock climbing, famous for its working-class public house and campground tradition. Harding preferred gallon jugs of the very cheapest variant of red, and named the creaky ledge holding their hammocks, "wino tower". "Had the rescue team been overzealous," he continues, "a wild insane fight with piton hammers might have ensued. For we were very determined not to be hauled off our climb." Seven days later, after 27 nights on the cliff, they pulled over the top to a throng of reporters, well-wishers, the curious, and the critical.

Harding's climbing style was considered controversial because he was more willing to employ artificial aids which become a permanent part of the environment, especially expansion bolts. These take a long time to put in, but are not removable. And as they can be put in anywhere, take some of the skill and the risk out of rock climbing. Some critics, such as historian Steve Roper, English Mountain magazine editor Ken Wilson, and southern Californians such as Robbins and Yvon Chouinard, felt that Harding's willingness to use expansion bolts took some of the adventure away from climbing.

Harding granted that some of those climbers had more skills than he, but always disputed their "zealotry" and "purity". He also argued that it was hypocrisy to accuse him of publicity hounding, as many of them developed lucrative mountain climbing businesses, making tens of thousands, if not millions of dollars a year, selling clothing and equipment. This controversy reached a high point when Harding's chief rival, Robbins, began the second ascent of his Early Morning Light route, hanging in Harding and Caldwell's bolt and bat-hook holes, and then cutting off the hangers, declaring he wished to restore the rock to its pristine state—which make a third ascent unlikely. The irritated Harding called the southerner Robbins a "Carrie Nation" of rock climbers, and felt vindicated when Robbins eventually decided the climb was harder than it looked and ultimately respected it by not cutting any more bolts as he and Don Lauria completed the second ascent.

== Retirement, influence, legends, and anecdotes ==
Lito Tejada-Flores, whose essay Games Climbers Play, was influential at the time of Harding's exploits, viewed Harding as 'outside' the game as it was played by most. Harding was rather 'inventing new ones' and 'from time to time, even a masterpiece.' That was how he described the 28-day Dawn Wall event: 'a great climb whose greatness is...in the experiential content of such extended life on a wall.'

After the 1980s, Harding did very little climbing, retiring to the northern hills of the Sierra Nevada, going hot-air ballooning with his close friends Mary-Lou Long and Roger Derryberry, and continuing his love of cheap red wine. He died in 2002 of liver failure.

== First ascents ==
=== 1950s ===
- 1954 Harding's Chimney & Harding's Other Chimney, Sugarloaf, Lake Tahoe, CA, with Jim Ohrenschall.
- 1954 Upper & Lower Phantom Spire, Lake Tahoe, CA, with Jim Ohrenschall.
- 1954 North West Books, Left & Right Water Cracks, Lembert Dome, Tuolomme Meadows, CA, with Frank de Saussure, friends.
- 1954 East Buttress, Middle Cathedral Rock, Yosemite, CA, with Jack Davis and Bob Swift.
- 1954 North Buttress, Middle Cathedral Rock, Yosemite, CA, with Frank Tarver; Craig Holden and John Whitmer.
- 1956 East Arrowhead Chimney, Arrowhead Arete, Yosemite, CA, with Mark Powell.
- 1956 Promulgated Pinnacle, Sentinel Rock, Yosemite, CA, with Bob Swift.
- 1957 East Arrowhead Buttress, with Wally Reed and Mark Powell.
- 1957 The Worst Error, Elephant Rock, Yosemite, CA, with Wayne Merry.
- 1957 East Side, Bridalveil Fall, Yosemite, CA, with Mark Powell.
- 1958 Northwest Buttress, Ahwiyah Point, Yosemite, CA, with Wayne Merry.
- 1957-1958 The Nose, El Capitan, Yosemite, CA, with Wayne Merry and George Whitmore (47 days in several pushes).
- 1959 Beverly's Tower, Cookie Cliff, Yosemite, CA, with Gerry Czamanske.
- 1959 Merry Old Ledge, Three Brothers, Yosemite, CA, with Gerry Czamanske.
- 1959 Southwest Face, Mt. Conness, Yosemite High Country, CA, USA, with Glen Denny and Herb Swedlund.
- 1959 East Face, Washington Column (later 'Astroman'), Yosemite, CA, USA, with Glen Denny and Chuck Pratt.

=== 1960s ===
- 1960 Keeler Needle of Mt. Whitney (14,000+ ft), with Glen Denny, Rob McKnight and Frank Gronberg.
- 1961 West Face, Leaning Tower, Yosemite, CA, with Glen Denny and Al MacDonald.
- 1962 Delectable Pinnacle, El Capitan, Yosemite, CA, with Brian Small.
- 1962 North Face, The Rostrum, Yosemite, CA, with Glen Denny.
- 1962 The Flue, Sentinel Rock, Yosemite, CA, with Bob Kamps.
- 1964 South Face Route, Mt. Watkins, Yosemite, CA, with Yvon Chouinard and Chuck Pratt.
- 1968 The Good Book, The (Right Side of the Folly), Yosemite, CA, with Tom Fender.
- 1968 West Face or Direct Route (NCCS VI F8 A3), Lost Arrow Spire, Yosemite, CA, with Pat Callis.
- 1969 Southwest Face, Liberty Cap, Yosemite, CA, with Galen Rowell and Joe Faint.
- 1969 Firefall Face, Glacier Point, Yosemite Valley, CA, with Galen Rowell.

=== 1970s ===
- 1970 South Face Route, Half Dome, Yosemite, CA, with Galen Rowell.
- 1970 The Wall of the Early Morning Light (The Dawn Wall), El Capitan, Yosemite, CA, with Dean Caldwell (28 days in one push).
- 1971 West Face, Kolana Rock, Hetch Hetchy, CA, with Galen Rowell.
- 1976 Porcelain Wall, Yosemite, CA, with Steve Bosque and Dave Lomba.
- 1975 Rhombus Wall, Royal Arches, Yosemite, Ca, with friends.
- 1976 West Arete, Mt. Winchell, Sierra Nevada, CA, with Galen Rowell.
- 1978 Forbidden Wall, Yosemite Falls, Yosemite, CA, with Dave Lomba, Christie Tewes and Steve Bosque.

== Gallery ==
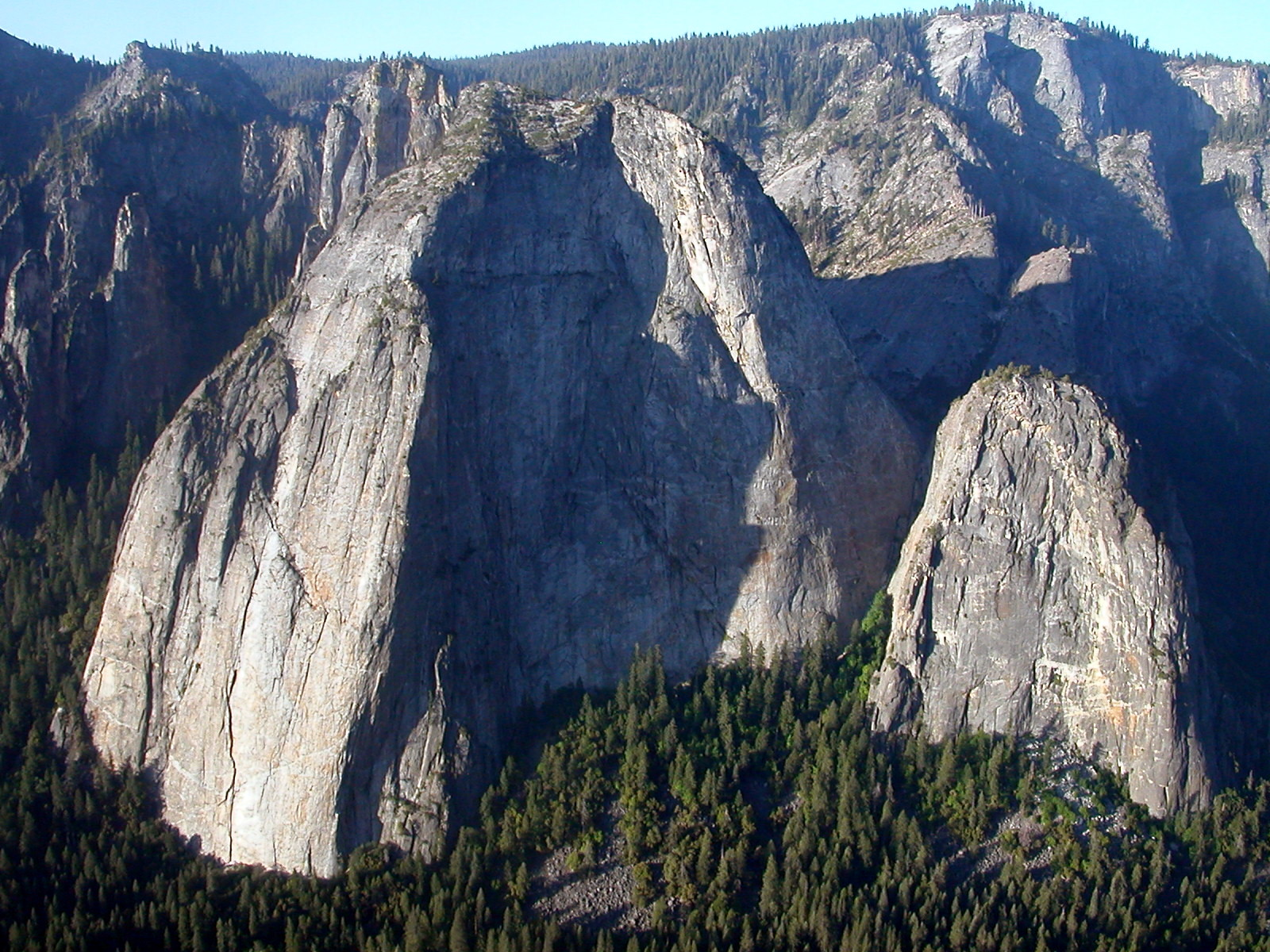
Harding's popular 'East Buttress' route on Middle Cathedral Rock goes up just right of the left skyline. The long 'North Buttress', also from 1954, goes up the long central buttress, just to the right of the area where the sun meets the shade.

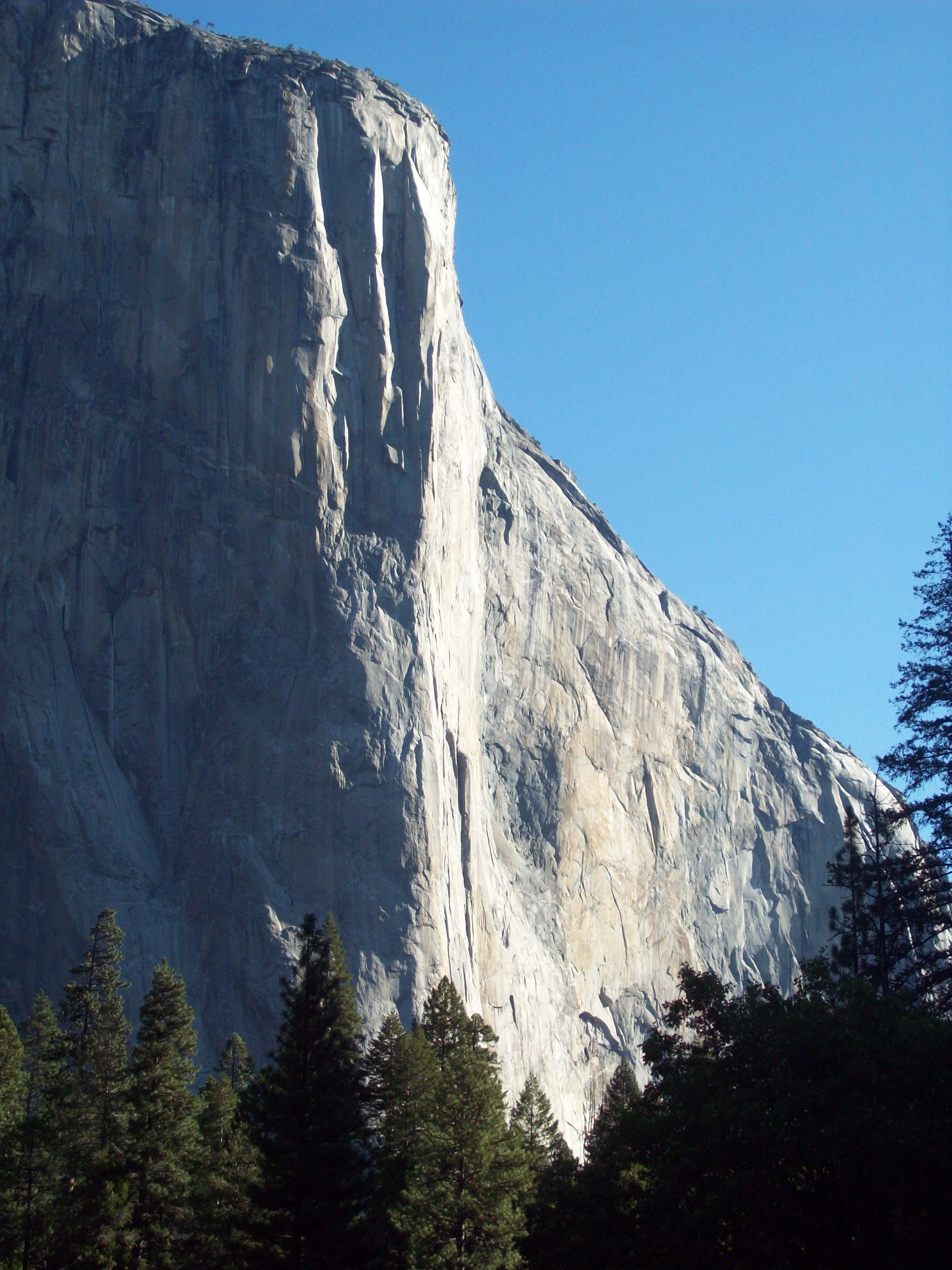
Harding's 2800 foot 'Nose Route' of El Capitan ascends a line meandering for roughly 30 rope lengths in the vicinity of where the sun meets the shade, arguably the most famous rock climb in North America.

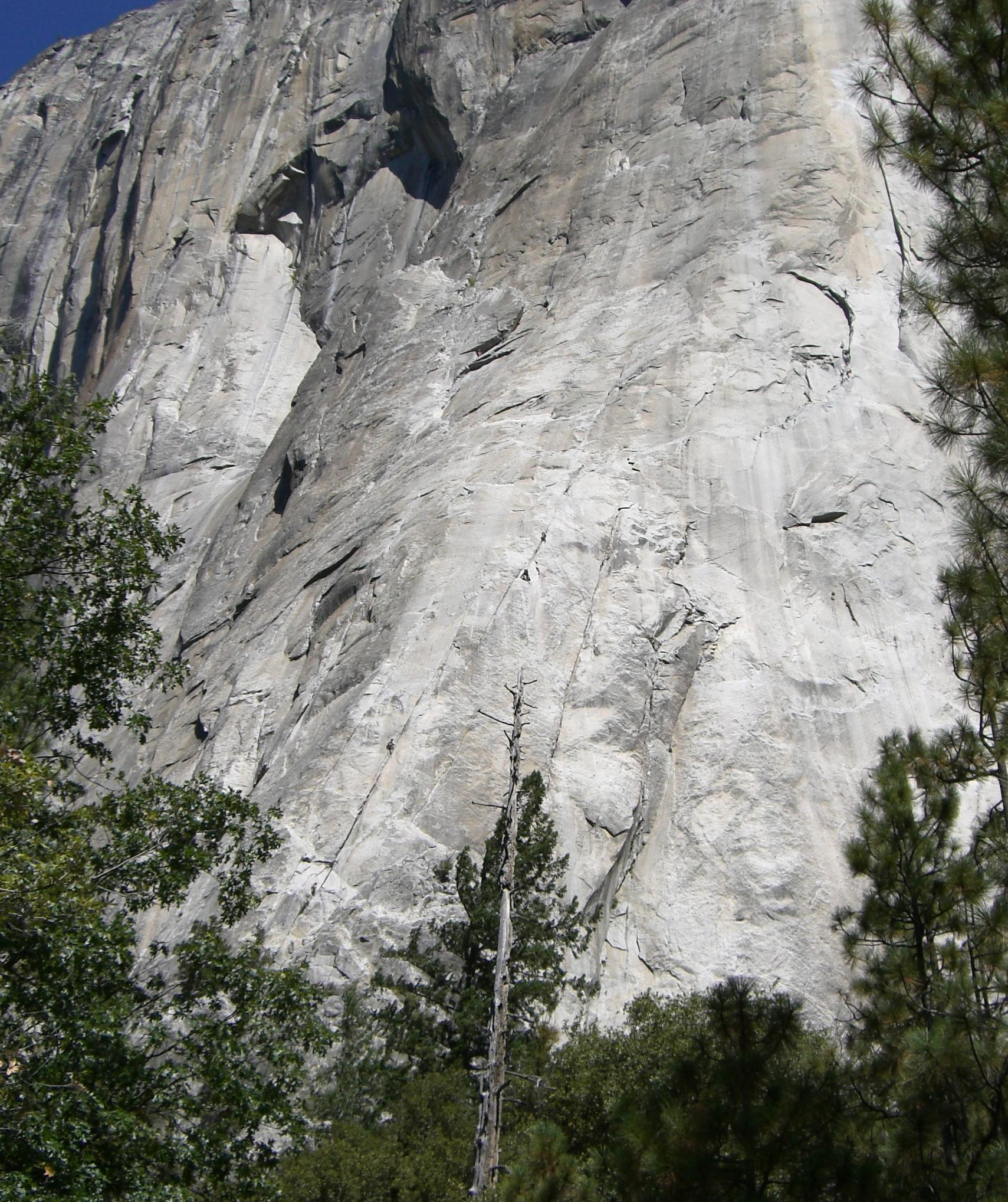
In this photograph, three different parties can be seen ascending the lower portion of the Nose route. Two are in the cracks, respectively' to the left and above the dead tree, and another party can be seen in the cracks in the upper right of the photo.

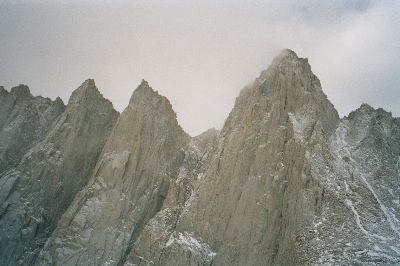
Harding's 1961 route up the Keeler Needle of Mt. Whitney ascends near the visible skyline of the middle formation, just left of the main East Face of Mt. Whitney.

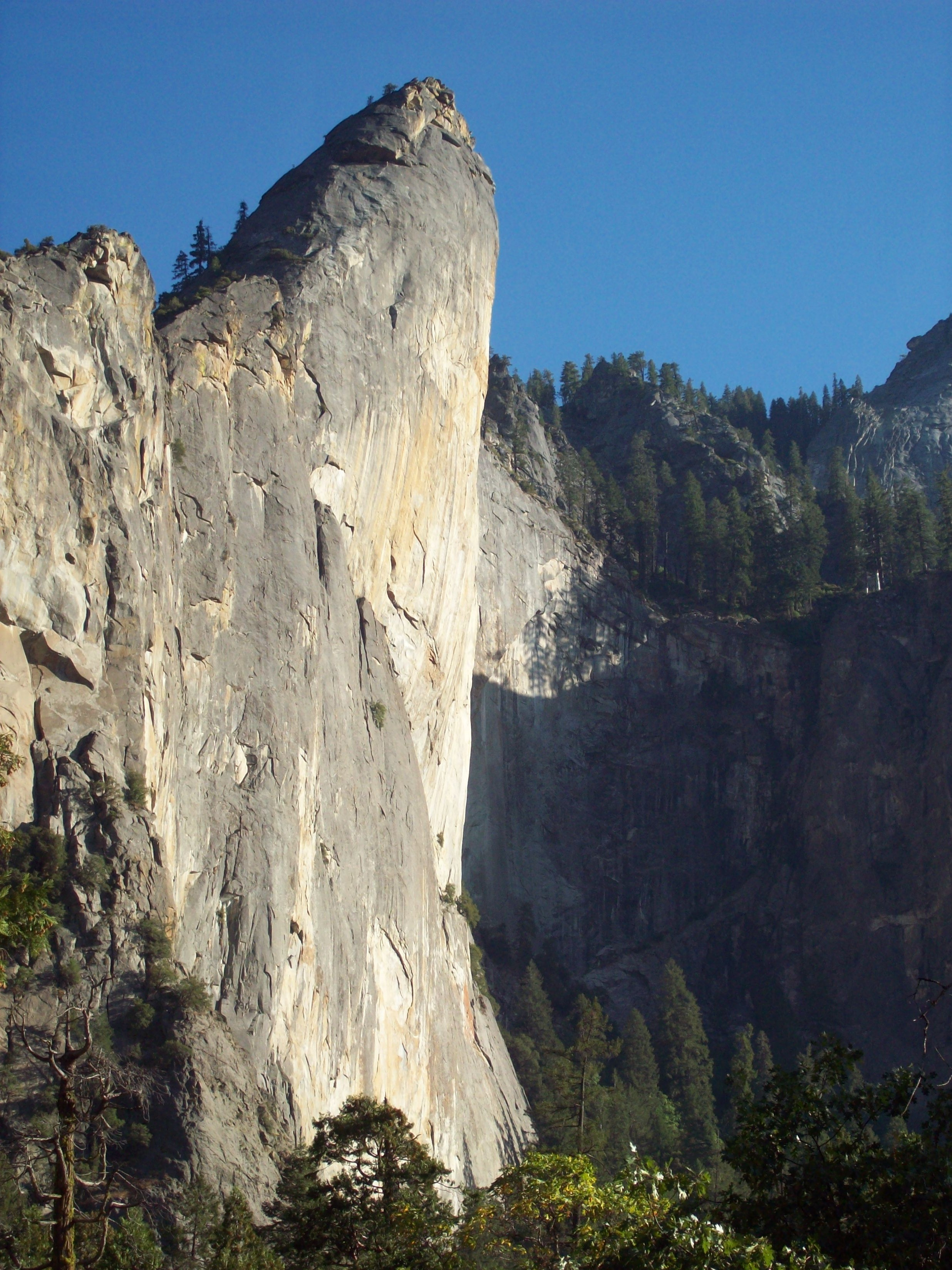
Harding spent eighteen days on the intimidating Leaning Tower in 1961, putting up a route up the wildly overhanging West Face of this Yosemite Valley formation with Glen Denny and Al Macdonald.

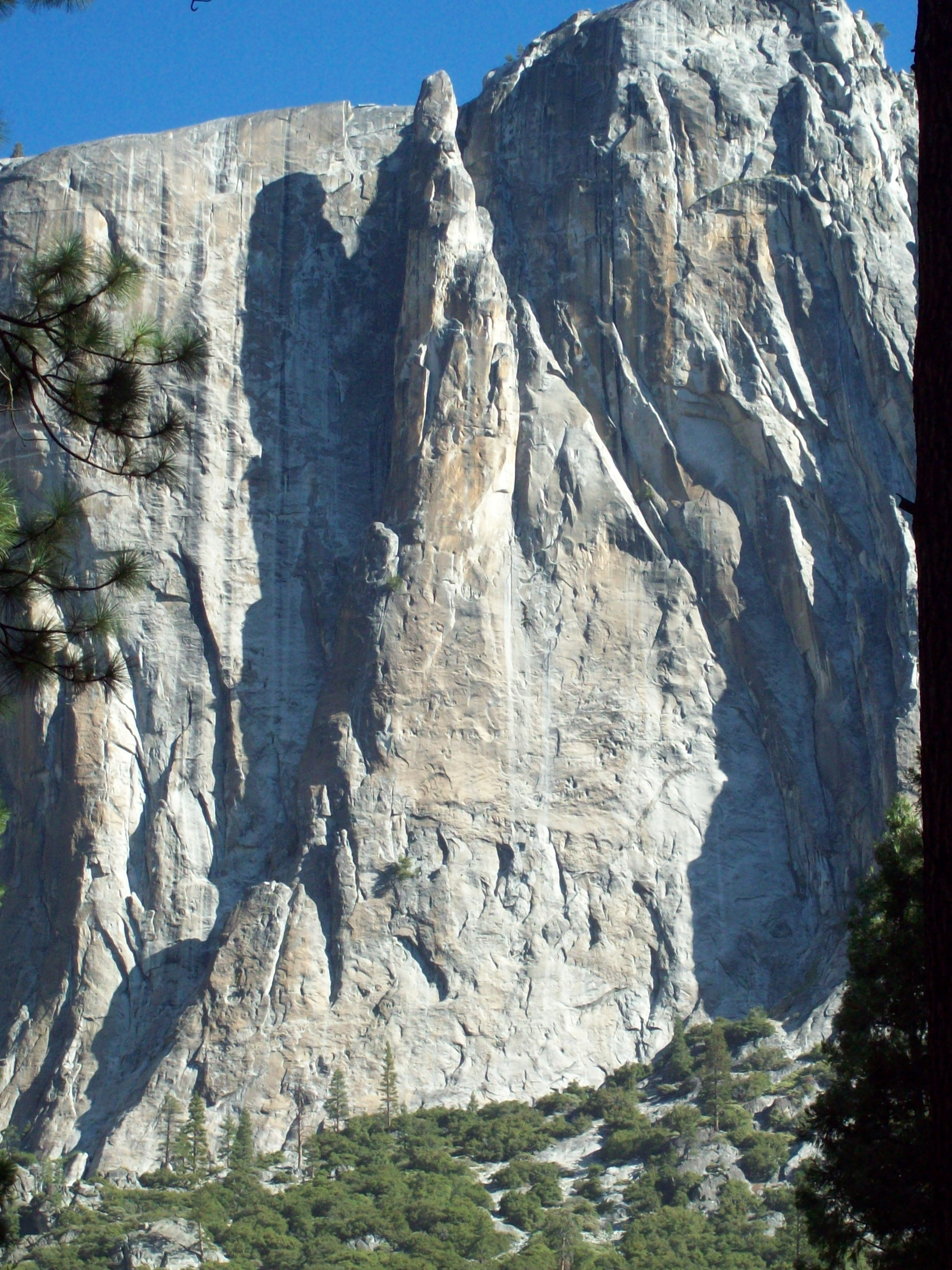
In June 1968, Harding climbed a direct route up the 1,400 foot Lost Arrow face near Yosemite Falls with Pat Callis, straight up the steep sunlit portion of the cliff to the tip of the detached pinnacle.

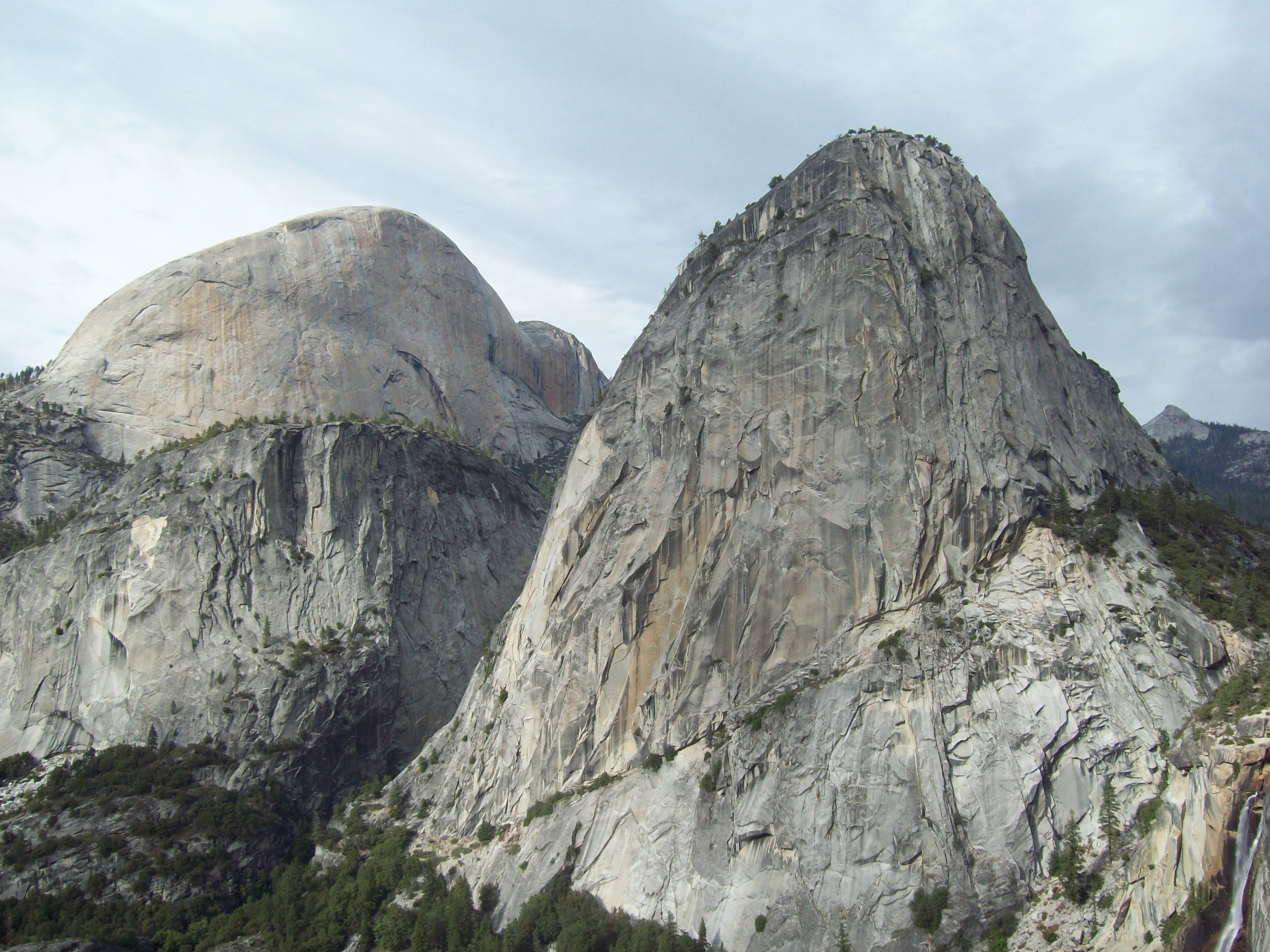
In 1969, Harding and photographer Galen Rowell climbed the south-west face of Liberty Cap, the feature on the right next to Nevada Falls in Little Yosemite Valley. In 1970, the pair returned for a major epic climbing the long slabby South Face of Yosemite's Half Dome on the left behind; their route following the distinctive arch to its top and then went straight up.

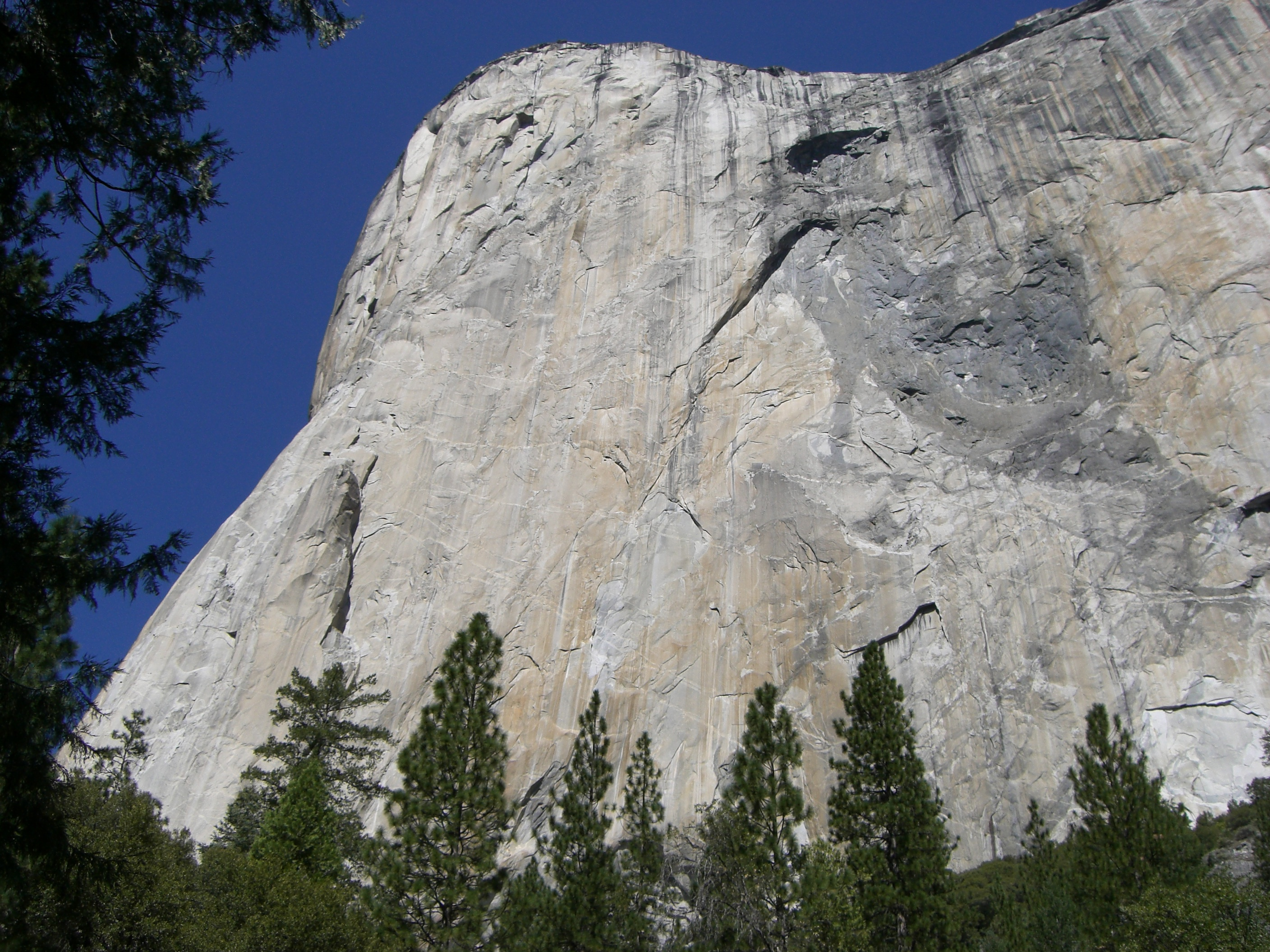
El Capitan's 'Wall of Early Morning Light': the 1970 Harding/Caldwell route goes up the tallest section of the cliff where it is continuously vertical or overhanging for the entire passage - the general line going straight up just slightly left of the left most grey waterstreak on the rim of El Capitan.

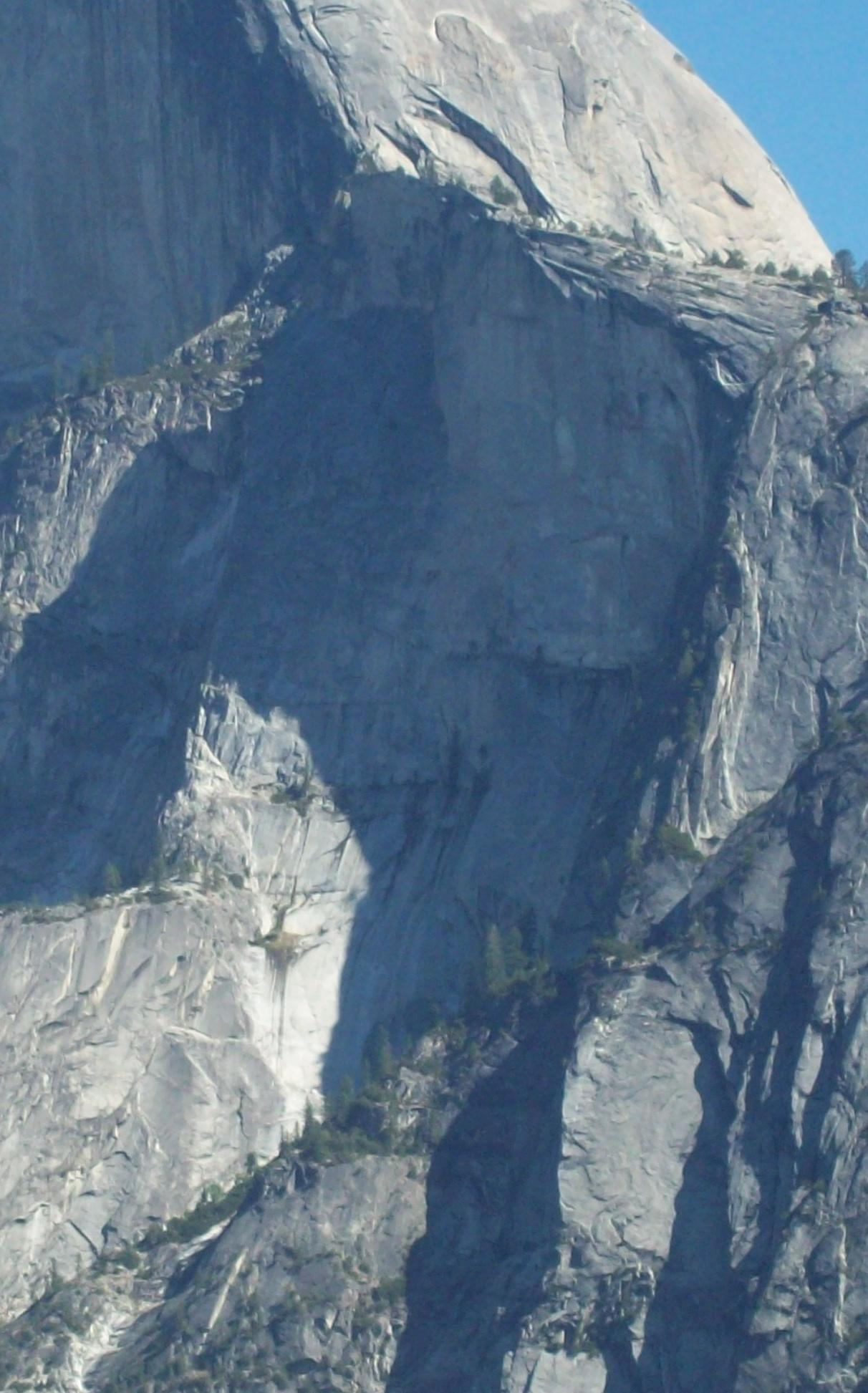
In 1976, Harding did the first ascent of this steep and shiny formation just east of Half Dome with Steve Bosque and Dave Lomba.

== Publications ==
- Harding, Warren (2016). Downward Bound: A Mad! Guide to Rock Climbing] ((reprint, original Prentice-Hall 1975) ed.). Yosemite, CA.: Joseph Reidhead & Company Publishers. ISBN 978-1-940777-40-5.
