= Utah Open Lands Conservation Association =

Nonprofit in the United States

- Founded: 1990; 36 years ago
- Tax ID no.: 87-0480542
- Legal status: 501(c)(3) nonprofit organization
- Purpose: To preserve and protect open space in order to maintain Utah's natural heritage and quality of life for present and future generations by assisting private landowners, government agencies, and communities in the voluntary preservation of the scenic, recreational, historic, and wildlife values of open land.
- Headquarters: 1488 South Main Street, Salt Lake City, Utah 84115, U.S.
- Coordinates: 40.737223°N 111.891389°W
- Executive Director: Wendy Fisher
- Revenue: $3,110,317 (2017)
- Expenses: $1,205,780 (2017)
- Endowment: $7,808,571 _{(2017)}
- Employees: 4 (2016)
- Volunteers: 35 (2016)
- Website: www.utahopenlands.org
- Formerly called: Summit Land Conservation Association

Utah Open Lands Conservation Association is a 501(c)(3) nonprofit land trust conservation association in the United States.

It is chartered to preserve and protect open space in order to maintain Utah's natural heritage and quality of life for present and future generations. This is achieved by assisting private landowners, government agencies and communities in the voluntary preservation of the agricultural, scenic, recreational, historic and wildlife values of open land.

Utah Open Lands started in Summit County, Utah, as the Summit Land Conservation Association in 1990. The organization expanded to be a statewide land trust in 1995.

Utah Open Lands works with landowners who want to preserve their land for conservation purposes. Their primary conservation tool is the conservation easement, which is a permanent, legally binding contract that restricts development to protect the special features of the property. Land ownership often remains unchanged when the land is protected by a conservation easement, meaning that the landowner retains title to the land and can continue to live on the land, use it, sell it, and or pass it on to the next generation. The Farm and Ranch Protection Act made available estate and income tax benefits for landowners who protect their land with conservation easements. The donation of a conservation easement may be considered a charitable contribution.

Utah Open Lands has effectively conserved over 60,000 acres (240 km^{2}) of critical open land in Utah.
