= Castleton Tower =

Summit in Castle Valley, Utah, US

Castle Rock
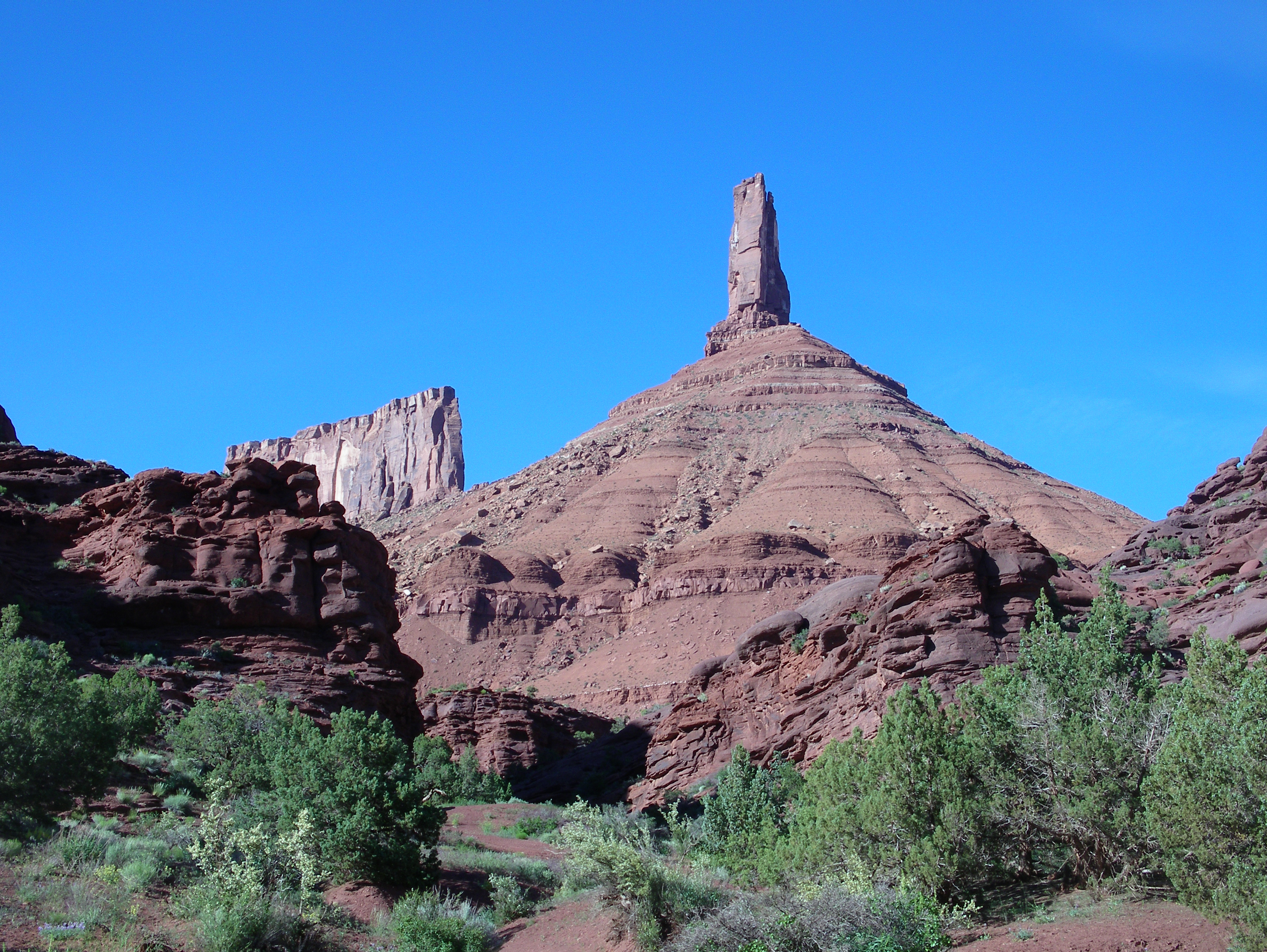
- South Face of Castle Rock viewed from the approach. In the background to the left is a rock formation commonly known as The Priest and Nuns.

Highest point
- Elevation: 6,660 feet (2,030 m) NAVD 88
- Prominence: 1,496 ft (456 m)
- Coordinates: 38°39′05″N 109°22′04″W

Geography
- Location within Utah
- Location: Grand County, Utah, U.S.
- Topo map: Fisher Towers

Castleton Tower (officially, Castle Rock) is a 6,660-foot (2,030 m) summit on the northeastern border of Castle Valley, Utah. The Wingate Sandstone tower itself is 400 feet (120 m) high and stands on a 1,000-foot (300 m) Moenkopi-Chinle cone. Castleton Tower is a popular subject for photography and for its classic rock climbing routes, the most famous of which is the Kor-Ingalls Route featured in Fifty Classic Climbs of North America. It can be accessed by a trail that begins south of the tower at a primitive camp ground.

== Location ==
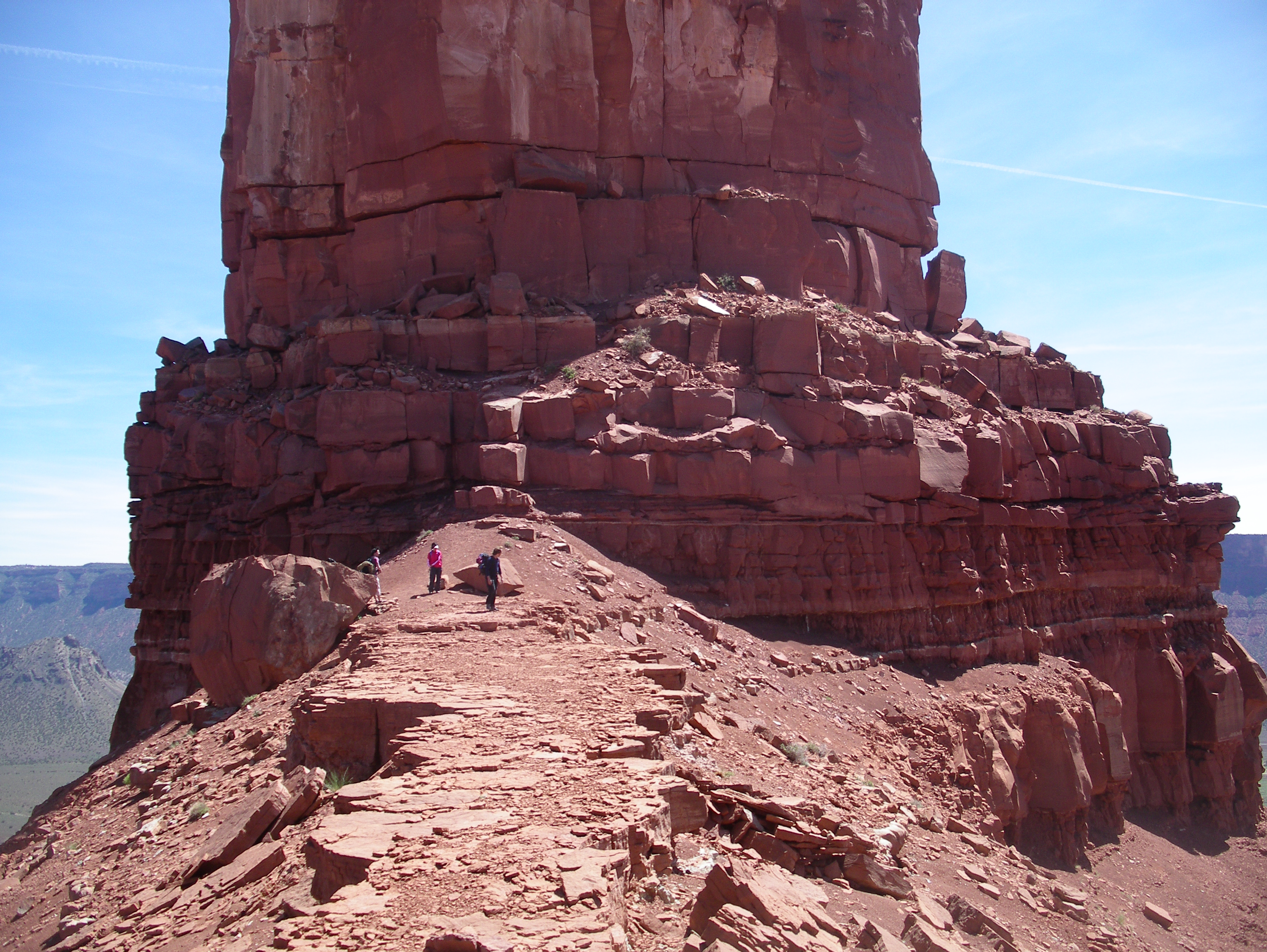
The base of Castleton Tower viewed from ridge on the standard approach. This vantage is between The Rectory and the Tower looking south at the Tower's north face.

Castleton Tower sits at the southern terminus of a ridge made mostly of red sand, gravel, scatter boulders, and few short cliff lines. The ridge runs north to south for about 2,800 feet (850 m) at its high point. Castleton Tower, with an area of about 40 by 400 feet (10 by 120 m) shares the ridge with the Rectory at the ridge's northern terminus with a similar height but considerably larger area of about 200 by 1,000 feet (60 by 300 m). This second structure is also referred to as the Priest and Nuns although those names are more often applied to specific structures connected to or contained in the Rectory. The nearest town is Moab, Utah about 10 miles (16 km) to the southwest and the area is generally accessed from Castleton Road off of Route 128 which runs along the Colorado River between I-70 and Route 191. The La Sal Range and the Manti-La Sal National Forest is visible to the Southeast, The Fisher Towers are visible to the Northeast, and the Colorado River with its associated cliffs lies to the Castleton 's Northwest.

== Ascent History ==
Among the most popular rock climbing destinations in the world, Castleton Tower has been summitted by thousands. Climbing historian Stewart Green reports that the number of successful ascents is over 40,000 and there have been so many that "no one really knows how many folks have reached the summit." The first ascent was completed September 16, 1961 by Layton Kor and Huntley Ingalls. Their route of ascent is still one of the most popular and carries their name, the Kor-Ingalls Route, and is rated 5.9. Today there are named routes of ascent on every aspect of the tower.

In 1964 and again in 1973, the tower was the location for two Chevrolet TV commercials. For both ads a car (along with a female model) was lifted to the summit in several sections using helicopters. The vehicle was then reassembled, filmed by a chopper crew, then disassembled and removed (including the model).

== Preservation ==
Much of the land in Castle Valley is or has been owned by Utah's School and Institutional Trust Lands Administration (SITLA). The SITLA is a state land trust which auctions and leases lands to private interests in order to fund Utah schools and related state institutions. In the spring of 1999 SITLA auctioned off one or two parcels of land extending to between 60 acres (24 ha) and 120 acres (49 ha), depending on the referenced report. The land initially went to an Aspen, Colorado land-developer with a local partner who planned to subdivide the land creating lots for residential housing. This plan would have eliminated the Tower's camping ground and reduced recreational access to the Tower's base. In response the Castle Rock Collaboration (CRC) formed to prevent commercial development. Over the next two years the CRC, Utah Open Lands Conservation Association, a non-profit land trust and partners were able to raise the money necessary to purchase the land initially bought by the developers and then work with SITLA to secure more land as open space. Thus far 221 acres (89 ha) of the land that encompasses the base of the Tower, including the primitive Climber's Campground, have been protected and is now owned and managed by the Utah Open Lands. Please contact Utah Open Lands for more information as needed.

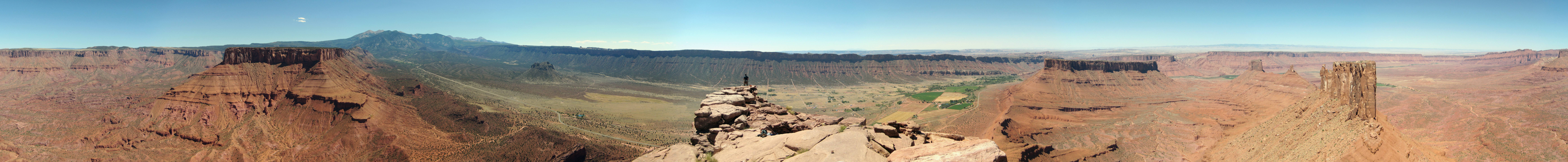
360° panorama taken from the top of Castleton Tower.
