= Kor-Ingalls Route =

Rock Climbing Route in Utah

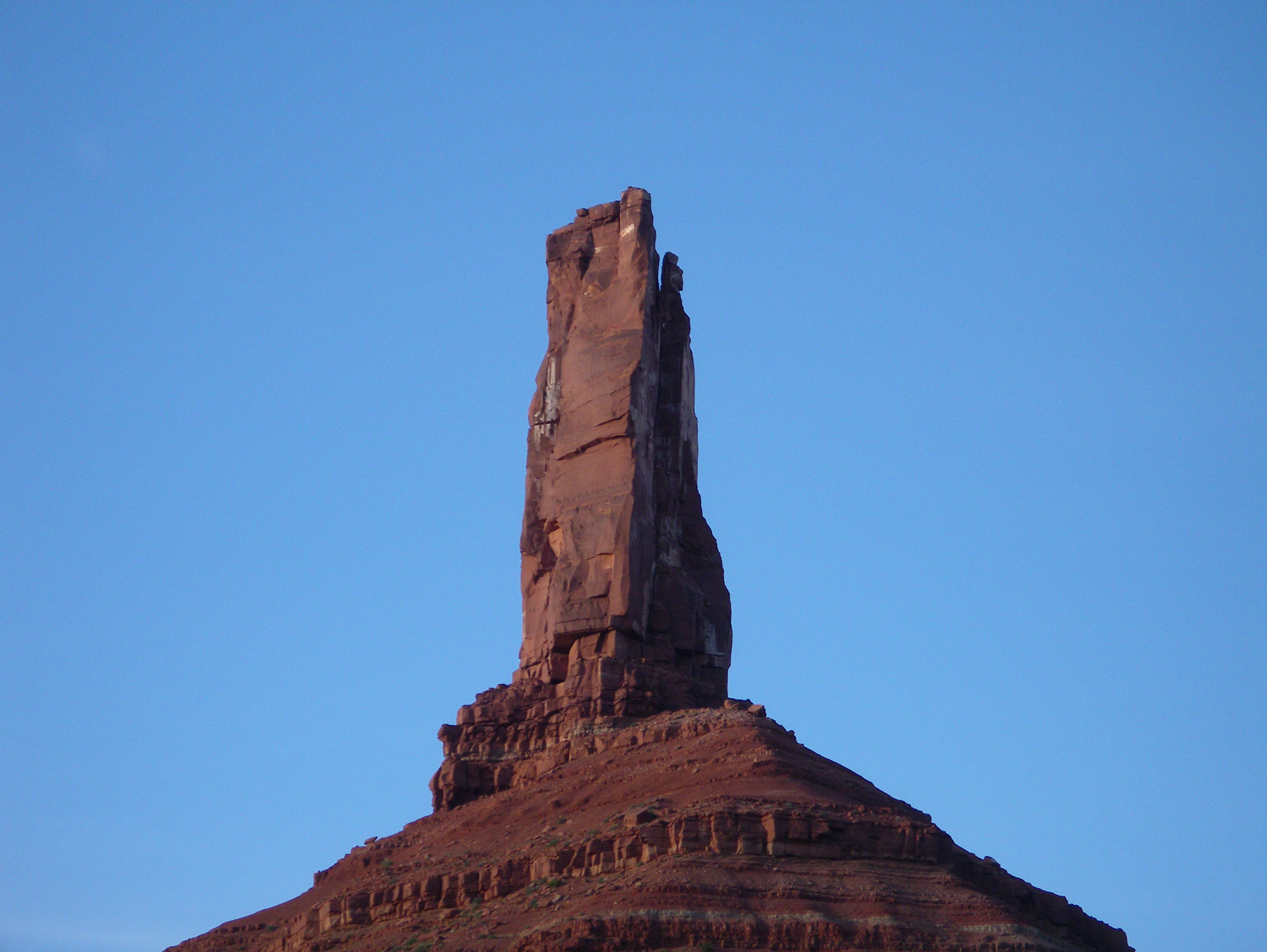
- The Kor-Ingalls Route is the obvious corner in shadow on the right.
- Location: Moab, Utah, USA
- Coordinates: 38°39′04.5″N 109°22′06.2″W
- Climbing area: Castleton Tower
- Route type: Trad climb
- Vertical gain: 375'
- Pitches: 4
- Technical grade: 5.9
- NCCS grade: III
- First ascent: Layton Kor & Huntley Ingalls, 1961.
- First free ascent: Harvey T. Carter & Cleve McCarty, 1962.

The Kor-Ingalls Route is a traditional rock climbing route located on Castleton Tower. Castleton Tower sits in Castle Valley North-East of Moab, Utah. The Route is recognized in the historic climbing text Fifty Classic Climbs of North America and considered a classic around the world.
