= D1 (Longs Peak) =

Climbing route

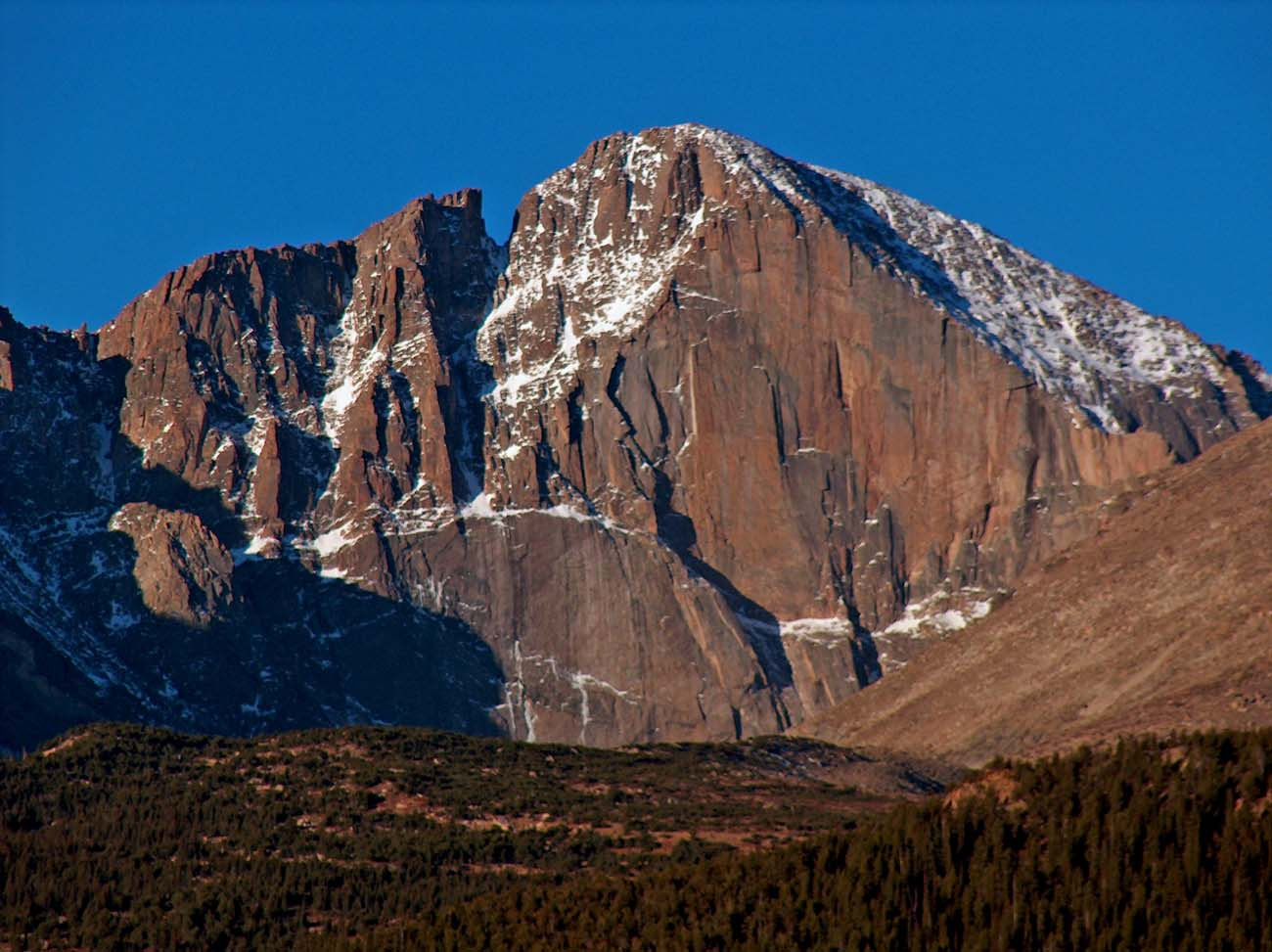
- East face of Longs Peak also known as the Diamond.
- Location: Rocky Mountain National Park, Colorado, USA
- Coordinates: 40.25470°N 105.6153°W
- Climbing area: The Diamond, Longs Peak
- Route type: Trad/Alpine
- Technical grade: 5.7 A4 or 5.12a
- NCCS grade: V
- First ascent: Dave Rearick and Bob Kamps, 1960.
- First free ascent: Bachar/Westbay; Achey/Briggs

The D1 is the original technical climbing route up the Diamond of Longs Peak. In 1954, when National Park Service was petitioned to allow climbing on the Diamond they responded with an official closure. Climbing on the Diamond was banned until 1960. When the ban was lifted later that year, Dave Rearick and Bob Kamps were the first to climb the Diamond via a route that would come to be known simply as D1. This route would later be listed in Allen Steck and Steve Roper's influential book Fifty Classic Climbs of North America. Today the route is not necessarily regarded as the best of its grade on The Diamond, some consider other routes to be of higher quality. The easiest and most popular route on the face, the Casual Route (5.10-), was first climbed in 1977.
