= The Diamond (Longs Peak) =

Cliff on Longs Peak in Colorado

Coordinates: 40°15′14″N 105°36′43″W

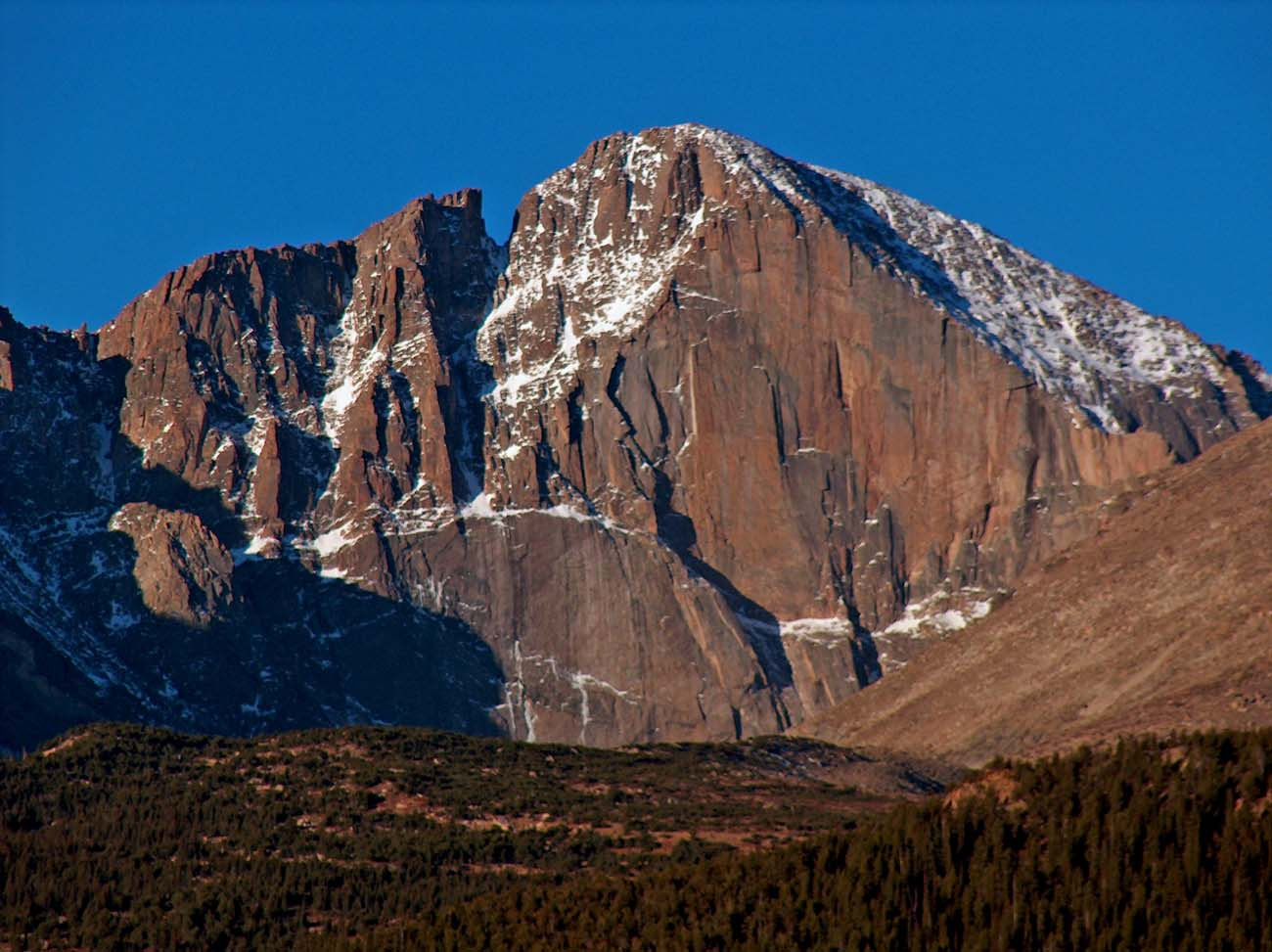
East face of Longs Peak, also known as the Diamond.

The Diamond is the sheer and prominent east face of Longs Peak and named for the shape of the cliff. The face has a vertical gain of more than 900 feet (270 m) all above an elevation of 13,000 feet (4,000 m). It is a world-famous Alpine climb.

== Climbing ==
In 1954, the first proposal made to the National Park Service to climb the Diamond was met with an official closure, a stance not changed until 1960. The Diamond was first ascended by Dave Rearick and Bob Kamps, August 1–3, 1960, by a route that would come to be known simply as D1. This route would later be listed in Allen Steck and Steve Roper's influential book Fifty Classic Climbs of North America. The easiest route on the face, the Casual Route (5.10-), was first climbed in 1977 and became the most popular route up the wall.

== See also ==
- List of Colorado mountain ranges
- List of Colorado mountain summits
  - List of Colorado fourteeners
  - List of Colorado 4000 meter prominent summits
  - List of the most prominent summits of Colorado
- List of Colorado county high points
