= Pat Ament =

American climber, author and filmmaker

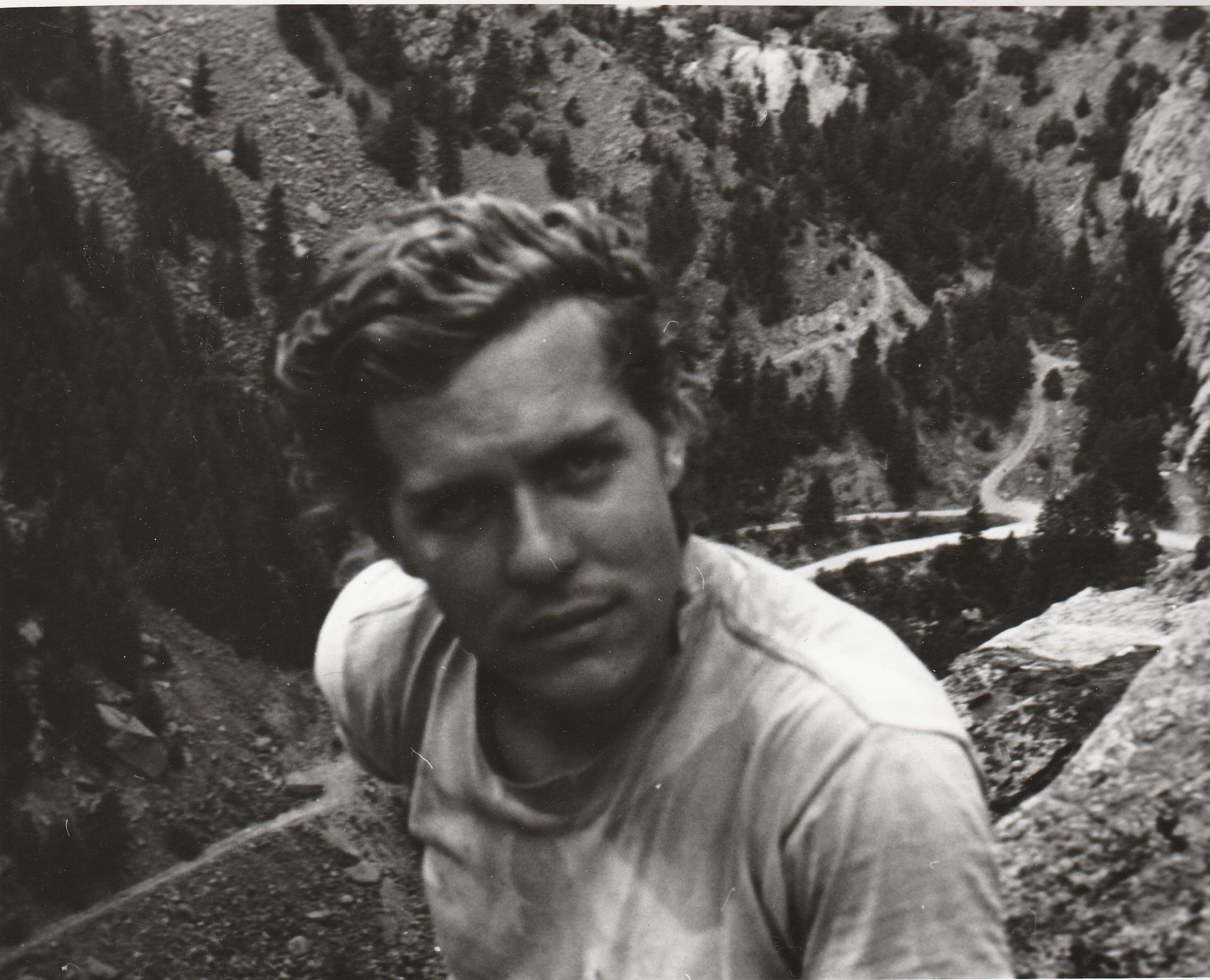
Pat Ament in the early 1970s, in Eldorado Canyon

Pat Ament (born September 3, 1946) is an American rock climber, filmmaker, musician, and artist who lives in Elko, Nevada. Noted for first ascents in the 1960s and 1970s, he is the author of many articles and books.

== Climbing career ==
Ament began climbing in 1958, and by the mid 1960s had established the first 5.11 climbs in Colorado (Supremacy Crack) and Yosemite (Center Route on the Slack). A college gymnast, he was a dedicated boulderer and put up many challenging problems on Flagstaff Mountain in Boulder, Colorado, elsewhere in Colorado and in Yosemite Valley. His climbing and bouldering companions over the years have included Royal Robbins, Bob Kamps, Don Whillans, Tom Higgins, John Gill, and Layton Kor.

== Climbing author and filmmaker ==
Ament's best-known written works are his biographies of Royal Robbins and John Gill. He wrote a compendium of ascents and climbers in his 2002 work, "Wizards of Rock: A History of Free Climbing in America," and his "Climbing Everest" is a philosophical essay, adorned with cartoons by the author. Ament is a poet and artist. He won the "Artist Award" from the Art Department of the University of Colorado in 1967. He is a photographer and has given talks around the country, illustrated with his photos. He was twice guest speaker for the British National Mountaineering Festival and has won several awards for films he has made, including from Austria and the University of Geneva, Switzerland. In September, 2013, Ament was inducted into the Boulder Sports Hall of Fame.

=== Disciples of Gill ===
In November 2009, he released his latest film Disciples of Gill, a documentary about John Gill and the boulderers he inspired, such as Jim Holloway and Ament himself. The film features archival footage from 40 years ago as well as modern interviews with older climbers describing where they are now. During the filming, Ament himself took a fall, seriously injuring his leg.

== Publications ==
Pat Ament has had over a hundred articles published in mountaineering magazines, journals, and other publications. Dozens of his articles have been included in anthologies of the best climbing and mountaineering writings.

His books include:

- Ament, Pat (1967). "High Over Boulder" (first of 5 revised editions). D&K Printing, Boulder, Colorado.
- Ament, Pat (1973). "Swaramandal." Vitaar Publishing. Boulder.
- Ament, Pat (1977). "Master of Rock (the Biography of John Gill)." Alpine House, Boulder.
- Ament, Pat (1978). "Rock Wise, reflections, safety, and technique in rock climbing." March Press, Boulder.
- Ament, Pat (1980). "Eldorado -- a rock climber's guide." March Press, Boulder.
- Ament, Pat (1980). "A Climber's Playground, a guide to the boulders of Flagstaff Mountain." March Press.
- Ament, Pat (1984). "Direct Lines." Two Lights, Boulder.
- Ament, Pat (1992). Royal Robbins: Spirit of the Age. Boulder, Colorado, USA.: Two Lights. ISBN 1-881663-02-7.
- Ament, Pat (1989). "Care And Consciousness in Climbing." Two Lights Publishing, Boulder.
- Ament, Pat (1991). "High Endeavors." Mountain N' Air Books, La Crescenta, California.
- Ament, Pat (1996). Stories of a Young Climber. Two Lights, Boulder.
- Ament, Pat (1997). How To Be A Master Climber In Six Easy Lessons. Boulder, Colorado, USA.: Two Lights. ISBN 0-9648606-4-3.
- Ament, Pat (1998). Royal Robbins: Spirit of the Age. Stackpole Books, Pennsylvania.
- Ament, Pat (1998). John Gill: Master of Rock. Stackpole Books, Pennsylvania.
- Ament, Pat (1999). "Reflections on Being the Best Climber in the World." Two Lights Publishing.
- Ament, Pat (1999). "Ten Keys to Climb Everest." Two Lights Publishing.
- Ament, Pat (1999). Climbing Everest. Ragged Mountain Press/McGraw-Hill.
- Ament, Pat (2002). "Climber's Choice (best writers present their work)." Ragged Mountain/McGraw-Hill.
- Ament, Pat (2002). Wizards of Rock: A History of Free Climbing in America. Wilderness Press, Berkeley.
- Ament, Pat (2003). "Too High, misadventures on Everest (a book of cartoons)." Two Lights.
- Ament, Pat (2003). Joseph Smith's Prophetic Gifts His Prophecies Fulfilled. Two Lights.
- Ament, Pat (2005). "Everything That Matters, (Remembering Rock Climbing)." Two Lights.

Master of Rock and Spirit of the Age have been translated and published in Japanese, Italian, and Spanish.
