= Jim Detterline =

American mountaineer (1956–2016)

- Born: James Lee Detterline; February 28, 1956; Pottsville, Pennsylvania, US
- Died: October 2016 (aged 60); Boulder County, Colorado, US, near Allenspark
- Cause of death: Climbing accident
- Other names: "Mr. Longs Peak"
- Education: Moravian College (BS); Memphis State University (MS, PhD)

James Lee Detterline (February 28, 1956 – October 2016) was an American mountaineer, rescuer, and park ranger. He was known for having around 428 ascents of Longs Peak (the most of any person); a feat for which Tom Hornbein dubbed him "Mr. Longs Peak".

== Personal life ==
Detterline was born in Pottsville, Pennsylvania, in the state's Coal Region. He credited his dad with piquing his interest into the outdoors. Detterline's parents were Rev. Milton E. Detterline and Nancy Day Detterline. Jim's mother later remarried and changed her last name to Weeber.

When he was eight years old, his parents went on a family vacation to Kentucky, including Natural Bridge State Park. While there, he decided to test for the Kentucky Junior Naturalist Award, and upon receiving it, became the youngest person to have earned the honor.

=== Education ===
Detterline was a graduate of Boyertown Area Senior High School, and went on to Moravian College, where he earned a B.S. in biology (1978). He later attended what was then Memphis State University, and received an M.S. in vertebrate zoology (1982) and a Ph.D. in invertebrate zoology (1989). He served as president of the Memphis Mountaineers in 1986 and 87, and later as an expedition leader to Ecuador in 1988 and Argentina in 1989.

=== Relationships ===
For some time while he was at Memphis, he was married to a woman named Jennifer. He married his widowed wife, Rebecca, in 2012.

== Career ==
Detterline first began climbing while at Moravian. He climbed actively until he became discouraged in 1980 following a near-death experience. Detterline and a friend were climbing at Grand Teton, and were trapped by a storm for five days before being rescued by rangers. Detterline said after the incident: "I'm discouraged from alpine climbing. That's it for a while."

Detterline began his National Park Service career in 1982 at Dinosaur National Monument, though moved to Rocky Mountain National Park in 1984, and was assigned to Longs Peak specifically in 1986. From 1987 to 2009 he served as a park ranger of the Longs Peak area. Detterline was awarded the Valor Award from the U.S. Department of the Interior in 1996, citing his bravery in rescuing two people from a river the previous year. He had waded into a river while others were setting up equipment and stopped a couple from flowing over a 75-foot waterfall. The couple was in the Roaring River within Rocky Mountain park boundaries and lunged to grab on to Detterline, and he held on to them until they were pulled to safety. In total, Detterline had performed over 1,200 rescues during his career.

Detterline's career as a ranger had a stint as Longs Peak supervisory ranger starting in 1987, but he was reassigned in November 1996, an act he felt was discriminatory against his hearing loss, especially when it had been less than a year since he had received the Valor Award. Other park employees and the public became concerned that the mountain would become more dangerous without his supervision. He was able to remain supervisory ranger until 2008, though in 2001 he was put on light duty, reducing his options for career progression. He retired in 2009. Following his retirement, he still worked at multiple jobs, including a wrangler at a lodge, an operator for a scientific contractor, and as an adjunct professor for Front Range Community College's campus in Larimer County. He was also a volunteer firefighter for the Allenspark Fire Department.

During his lifetime, he held the record for most consecutive months summiting Longs Peak, with a streak of 2 years, 7 months ending in October 2001. (The record was later beaten by Lisa Foster, who set a three-year streak in 2022.) Detterline's record of over 420 summits of Longs Peak at the time of his death beat Shep Husted's record of 350, a record which Detterline broke in 2010.

Detterline played the trumpet in a band. He was also an advocate for the hard of hearing; for which he received a Focus on People Award from Oticon in 2010; he was the first place winner in the adult category. Also as part of his hearing loss advocacy, he often took hard of hearing youth on hikes to the summit of Longs.

== Death ==
Detterline was last seen alive on October 23, 2016; his wife saw him then before she embarked on a trip. His body was found in the afternoon of October 25, and it is presumed he had died earlier that day. He died from an accidental fall climbing the "Ironclads" formation less than a mile from his Allenspark, Colorado home. His Border Collie Annie was waiting near him when the body was discovered. He was 60 years old. The Allenspark Fire Protection District posted a picture of Detterline to their Facebook page following his death.
