= Mount Meeker =

Mountain in Colorado, United States

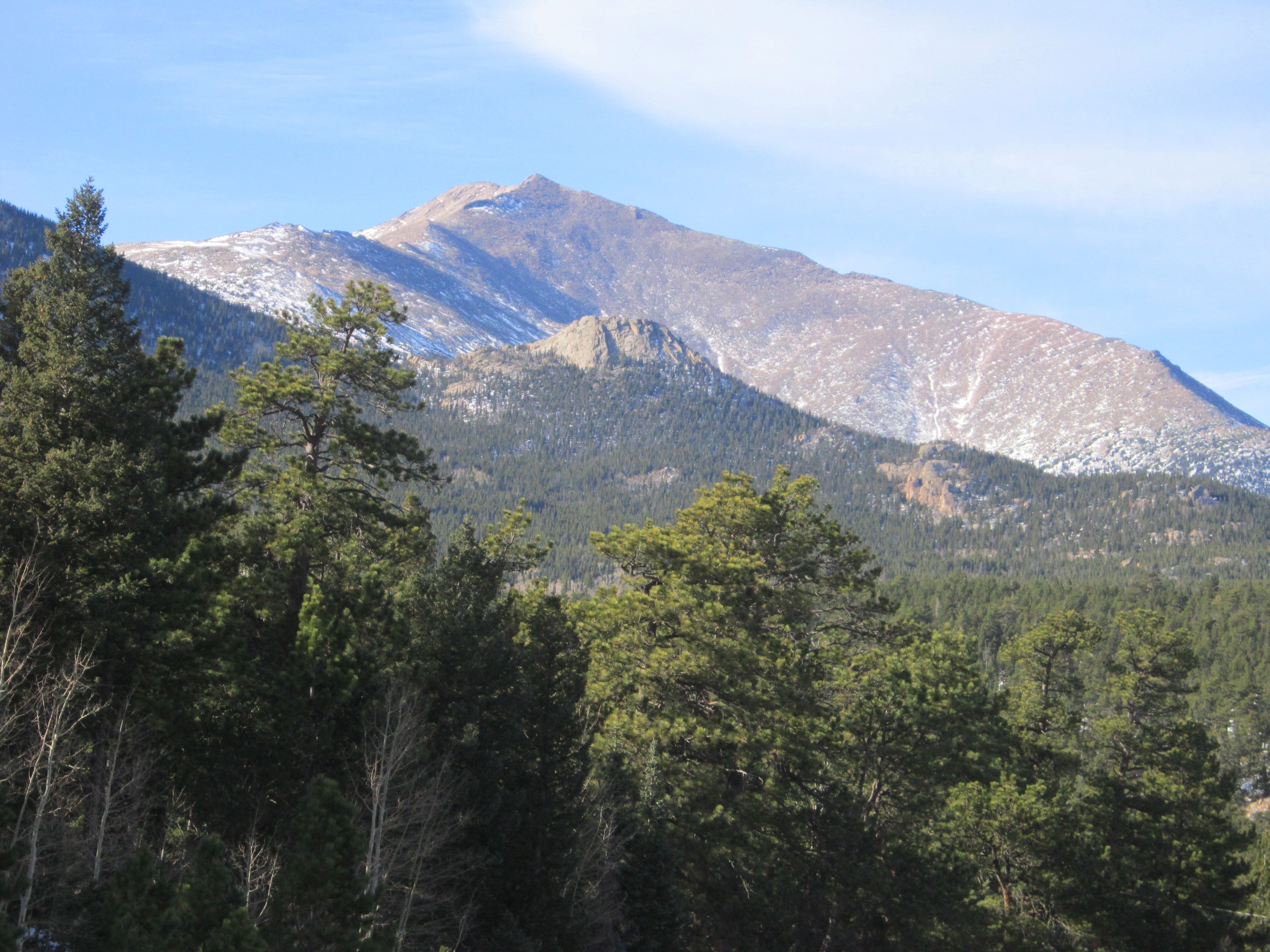
- Mount Meeker seen from State Highway 7.

Highest point
- Elevation: 13,916 ft (4,242 m)
- Prominence: 451 ft (137 m)
- Parent peak: Longs Peak
- Isolation: 0.73 mi (1.17 km)
- Coordinates: 40°14′55″N 105°36′18″W

Geography
- Location within Colorado
- Location: Rocky Mountain National Park, Boulder County, Colorado, U.S.
- Parent range: Front Range, Twin Peaks Massif
- Topo map(s): USGS 7.5' topographic map Allenspark, Colorado

Mount Meeker is a high mountain summit of the Twin Peaks Massif in the northern Front Range of the Rocky Mountains of North America. The 13,916-foot (4,242 m) thirteener is located in the Rocky Mountain National Park Wilderness, 4.8 miles (7.7 km) west by north (bearing 285°) of the community of Allenspark in Boulder County, Colorado, United States.

== Mountain ==
Mount Meeker is the second highest summit in Rocky Mountain National Park after its neighbor Longs Peak, 0.7 miles (1.1 km) to the northwest. Due to its location southeast of Longs Peak, Mount Meeker is more visually prominent along much of the northern Front Range Urban Corridor. The peak is considered more difficult to climb, technically, than Longs Peak on certain routes.

== Historical names ==
Neniis-otoyou’u, or nesótaieux, ("two guides") is what the Arapaho people called both Longs Peak and Mount Meeker.

Les Deux Oreilles ("two ears") is what a couple of French trappers called Longs Peak and Mount Meeker in 1799.

The name "Mount Meeker" was first suggested in 1873 when the Hayden Survey was performed. Present were William Byers, Anna Dickinson, and Ralph Meeker, the son of Nathan Meeker. It was officially named this in 1911.

== Gallery ==
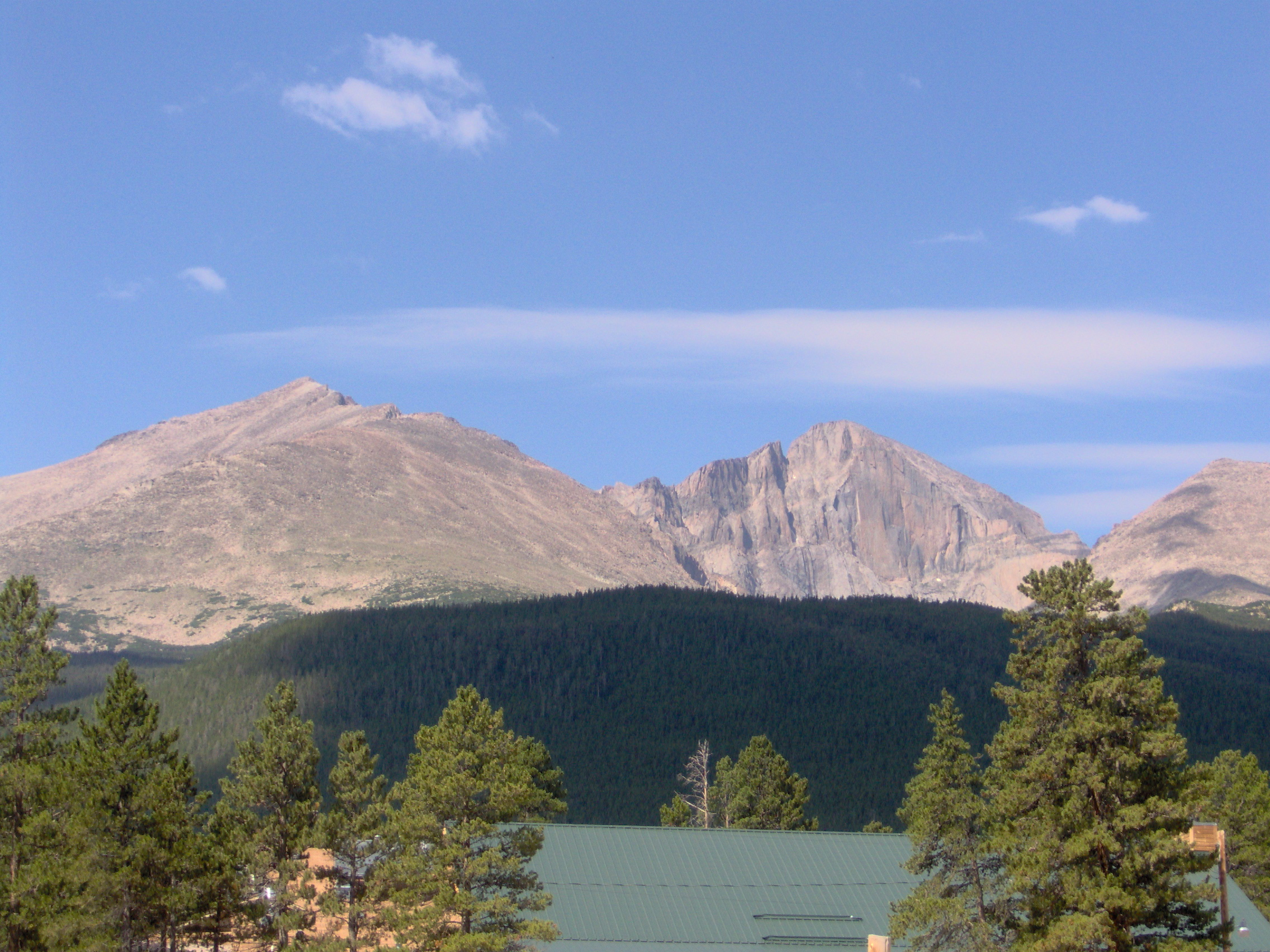
Mount Meeker (left) and Longs Peak (right)

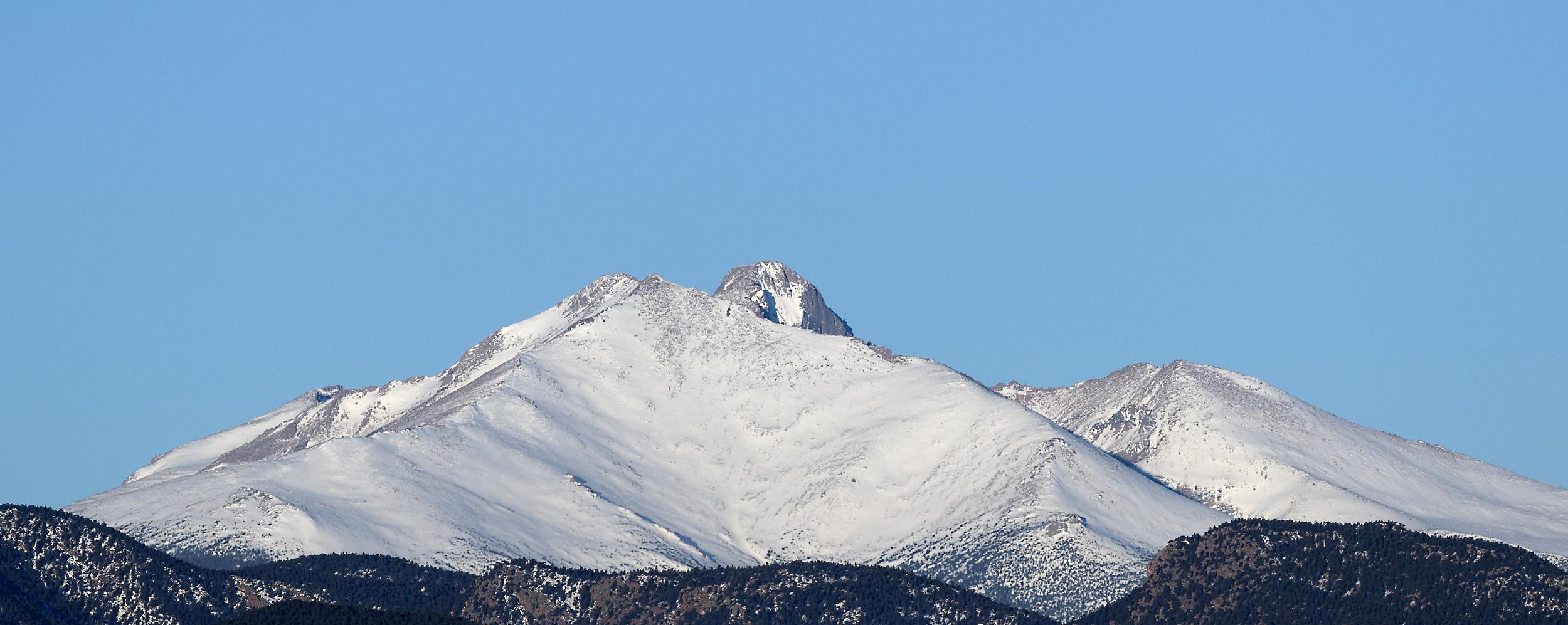
A view of the snow-covered Mount Meeker from Longmont. The rugged summit of Longs Peak is peeking out from behind.

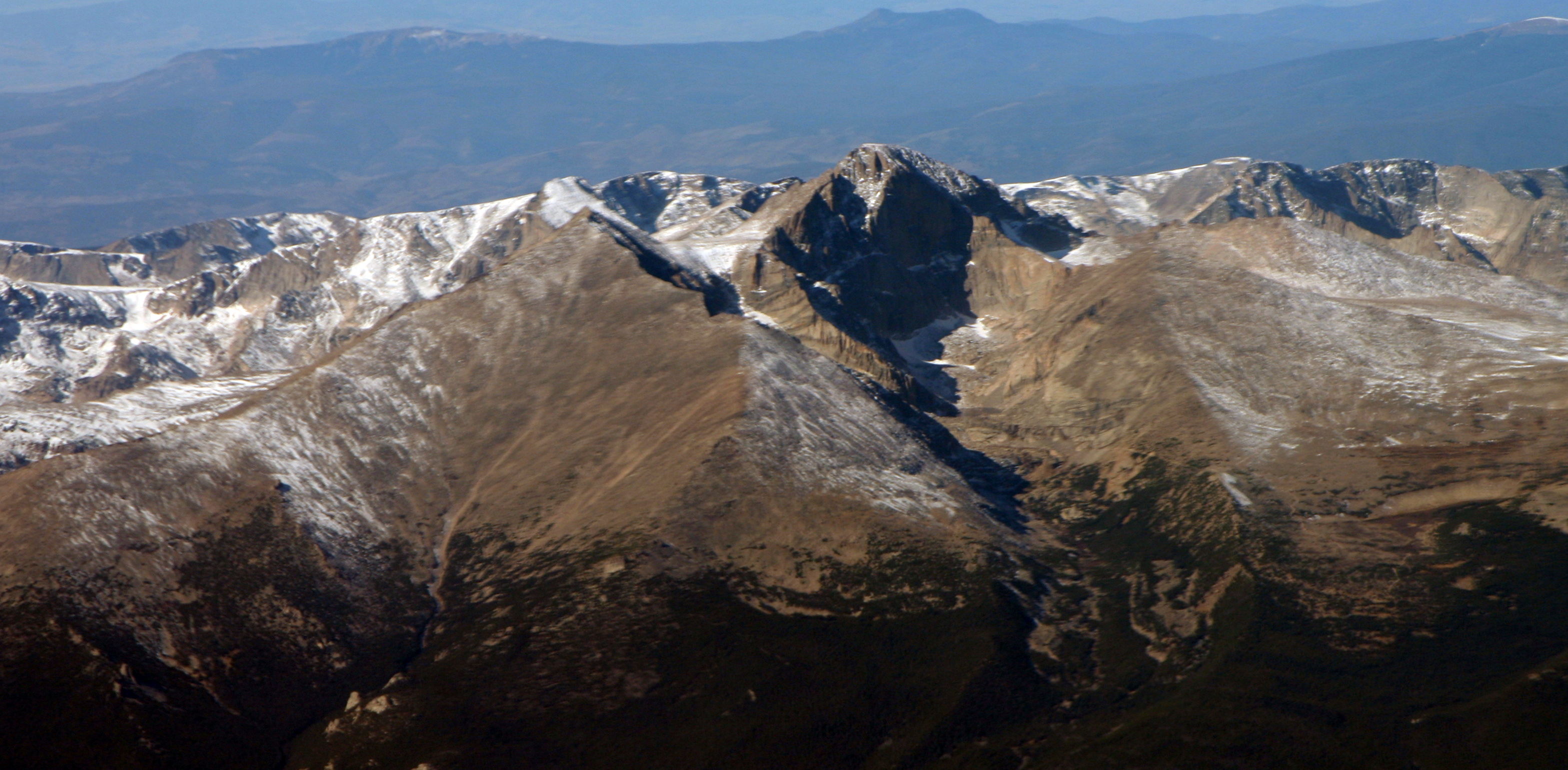
Aerial view of Mount Meeker and Longs Peak

== See also ==
- List of Colorado mountain ranges
- List of Colorado mountain summits
  - List of Colorado fourteeners
  - List of Colorado 4000 meter prominent summits
  - List of the most prominent summits of Colorado
- List of Colorado county high points
