= Mills Glacier =

Glacier in Colorado, United States

- Location within Colorado
- Type: Mountain glacier
- Location: Boulder County, Colorado, United States
- Coordinates: 40°15′20″N 105°36′38″W
- Terminus: Talus
- Status: Retreating

Mills Glacier is an alpine glacier near the base of the east mountain face of Longs Peak, in Rocky Mountain National Park in the U.S. state of Colorado.

== See also ==
- List of glaciers in the United States
