= Tom Higgins (climber) =

American rock climber (1944–2018)

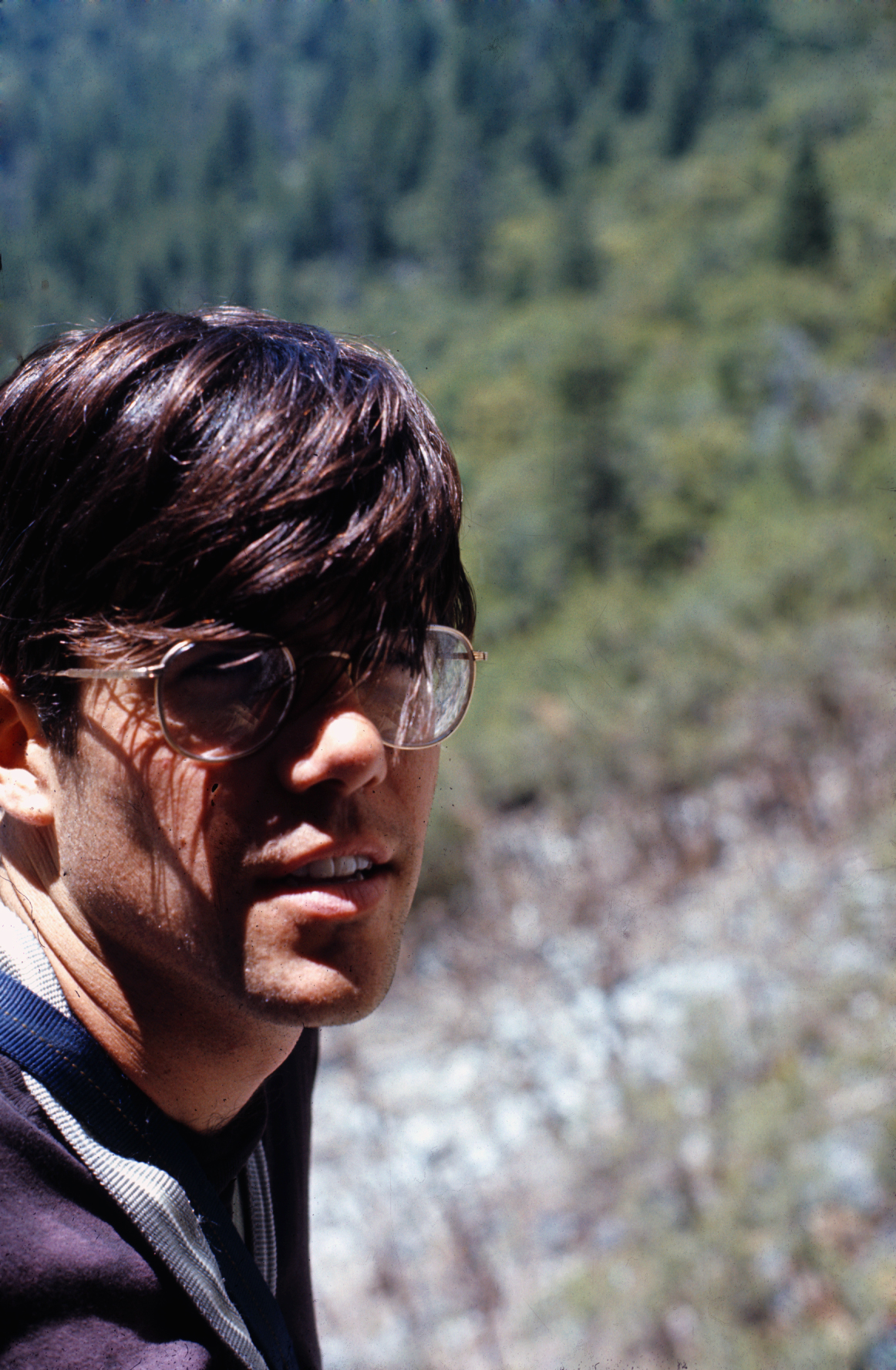
Tom Higgins, Yosemite Valley, 1968

Thomas John Higgins (November 7, 1944 – March 21, 2018) was an American rock climber with many first and first free ascents, primarily in the western United States. He was noted for pushing standards using a purist, free climbing style.

== Early climbs, Tahquitz Rock ==
He began climbing in the early 1960s with partners Bud (later Ivan) Couch and Russ McLean on the sandstone boulders and short cliffs of Stony Point near Los Angeles. He soon teamed up with lifelong climbing partner Bob Kamps. Together they did the 1963 first free ascent of Blanketty Blank at Tahquitz Rock 5.10c (6b) in Southern California. On this and other routes to follow, they employed chalkless, ground up climbing without previewing or rehearsing the route or resting on the rope. They also placed protection (including bolts) on lead, all elements of a climbing style now termed traditional climbing in contrast to sport climbing. Another notable first ascent at Tahquitz was 1964's Jonah, 5.10c and 6 pitches, with Mike Cohen and Roy Coats. He led the second free ascent of Kamps' Chingadera, 5.11a and led on sight, in early 1967; it was one of the hardest on sight leads in the US then. Near Tahquitz at Joshua Tree, he did the first free ascent of Left Ski Track on Intersection Rock. Done in April 1968, the climb is significant for its difficulty rating of 5.11a (6b+), unusual for the time.

== The High Sierra and Europe ==
Higgins began climbing in the High Sierra in California with the first ascent of the East Buttress of Agassiz Needle, Temple Crag with Couch; and the North Face of Mt. Morrison with Charlie Raymond. In 1964, Higgins and Couch visited Wales and climbed on a borrowed rope; they used only slings and machine nuts for protection, since pitons were forbidden on the cliffs. They also climbed in Chamonix, France, where Higgins teamed with English partners to do the first free ascents of the Direct East Face of the Aiguille de Moine (5.10), the Menegaux route (5.11a) on the Aiguille de l' M, and Albert West Face.

== Yosemite Valley, Tuolumne Meadows and other areas ==
In the late 60s, Higgins began climbing in Yosemite Valley. With Kamps, he did the first free ascent of the Powell-Reed (5.10c) on the NE Buttress of Middle Cathedral Rock in 1967. The same year, with Chris Jones, he did the first free ascent of Serenity Crack (5.10d/5.11a). Other first ascents include Punch Bowl, The Peanut, and Owl Roof. His ground up lead of The Void in 1971, short but difficult (5.11b), was then considered the hardest face climb in Yosemite. He developed his Yosemite crack climbing skills by building and practicing on a wooden, adjustable crack machine.

In Tuolumne Meadows above Yosemite Valley, Higgins teamed with Kamps, Vern Clevenger, Pat Ament, Chris Vandiver, Tom Gerughty and other partners to create new routes. He and others of the period stood on small edges and undulations, hammered with Rawl Drive drills to place quarter-inch bolts where necessary. Resulting popular routes include Lucky Streaks (5.10c/d, 6 pitches,1967), Nerve Wrack Point (5.9), The Vision (5.10a), Fairest of All (5.10c, 11 pitches, 1973), Curve Like Her (5.9), and Thy Will Be Done (5.10c, 1970). In 1974 he and Verne Clevenger finished Piece de Resistance (5.11c, 14 pitches), one of the hardest multi-pitch climbs in the US.. Higgins authored an introduction to Don Reid's 1983 Rock Climbs of Tuolumne Meadows guidebook ("A Climbing Commentary") on Tuolumne new route development and changing climbing styles. Outside the Meadows during the same period, Higgins climbed Hair Raiser Buttress with Clevenger at Granite Basin and first free of The Line with Frank Sarnquist at Lover's Leap, California.

As the 70s closed, climbing styles in Tuolumne and elsewhere changed. Climbers began placing protection from hooks and rappel. Rope rests and hangs for progress came into play. Higgins wrote a critique on changing climbing styles, "Tricksters and Traditionalists" for the Sierra Club publication, Ascent. The article was selected for a compilation, The Best of Ascent, Twenty-five Years of Mountaineering Experience The term traditional climbing coined in the article describes the prevailing style up to the mid 70s and now denotes a camp and philosophy of climbing – "Traditional climbing" as opposed to "Sport climbing."

In the 1980s, Higgins created first ascents and first free ascents at Pinnacles National Monument (now Pinnacles National Park) and in the Southern High Sierra mountains, California. On the Balconies at Pinnacles National Monument, Higgins climbed Shake and Bake with Chris Vandiver, and did the first free ascent of the Sacherer, Bradley & Roper route. With Frank Sarnquist, he did the first free ascent of Resurrection Wall. In the Southern Sierra with Ruprecht Von Kammerlander, Higgins did new routes on Fresno Dome; with Kamps, new routes in The Balls. On crackless Chiquito Dome, he did Elegance and Sahib with Chris Vandiver.

Higgins maintained a web site of articles and pictures about climb histories, as well as a collection of fiction, climber obituaries and style commentaries. Higgins was vice president and co-owner of the transportation consulting company K.T. Analytics, Inc. founded in 1984. He died on March 21, 2018, at the age of 73.

== Publications ==
- "In Thanks" and "Nerve Wrack Point" in The Games Climbers Play, A Selection of 100 Mountaineering Articles, Edited by Ken Wilson, Diadem Books LTD, London, 1978 (ISBN 0-906371-01-5).
- "In Due Time: A Play in Three Acts," in Ordeal By Piton, Writings from the Golden Age of Yosemite Climbing, Edited by Steve Roper, Stanford University Libraries, 2003 (ISBN 0-911221-26-3).
- "Soarks," in Climber's Choice, Edited by Pat Ament, Ragged Mountain Press/McGraw Hill, 2002 (ISBN 0-07-137723-9).
