= Casual Route =

Climbing route for Longs Peak, Colorado, US

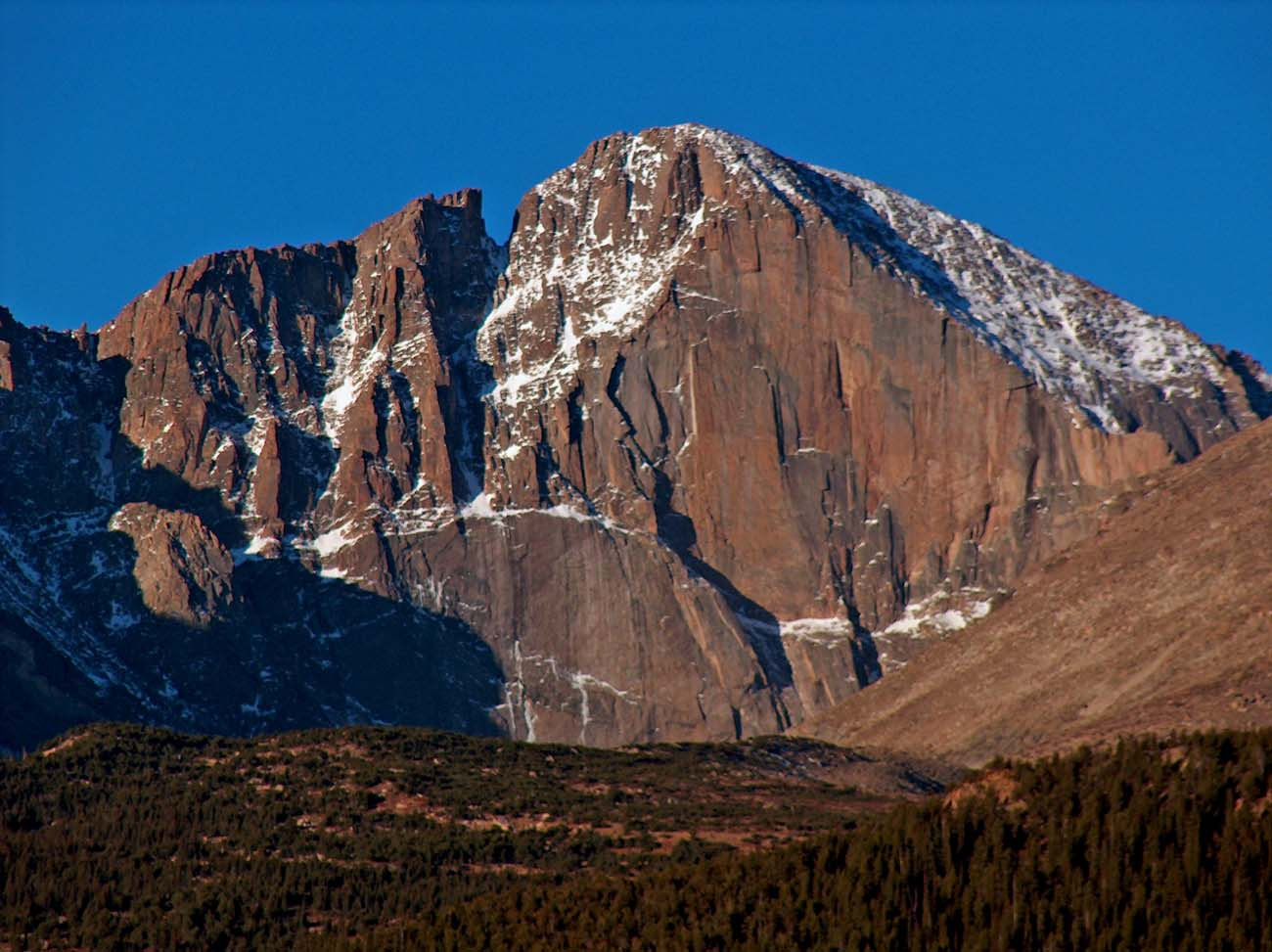
- East face of Longs Peak, also known as the Diamond
- Location: Rocky Mountain National Park, Colorado, USA
- Coordinates: 40.25470°N 105.6153°W
- Climbing area: The Diamond, Longs Peak
- Route type: Big wall climbing
- Vertical gain: 900 ft (approx. 275 m)
- Pitches: 7
- Technical grade: 5.10a
- NCCS grade: IV
- First ascent: Duncan Ferguson and Chris Reveley, 1977

The Casual Route is the easiest big wall climbing route up the Diamond (east face) of Longs Peak.
