= Dave Rearick =

American rock climber and mathematician (1932–2024)

David F. Rearick (August 5, 1932 – August 21, 2024) was an American rock climber and mathematician. A pioneer of Yosemite's golden age of climbing, Rearick – frequently climbing with Bob Kamps – was instrumental in shifting the focus from aid climbing to free climbing in the 1950s.

Rearick and Royal Robbins climbed the Vampire at Tahquitz Rock in California in 1959; though some aid was used (not eliminated until 1973), the route required 5.10 climbing, exceptionally difficult for the times. A year later the team of Robbins and Rearick established Yosemite's first 5.10 climb: the East Chimney of Rixon's Pinnacle.

In August 1960, Kamps and Rearick made the first ascent of the Diamond, the massive headwall on the east face of 14,255-foot (4,345 m) Longs Peak, in Colorado. Their ascent was reported in newspapers across America.

Rearick received a PhD in mathematics from Caltech, defending his thesis during the spring of 1960. He became a mathematics professor at the University of Colorado at Boulder, retiring in the 1990s.

Rearick died on August 21, 2024, at the age of 92.

== See also ==
- List of climbers
