= Bob Kamps =

American rock climber

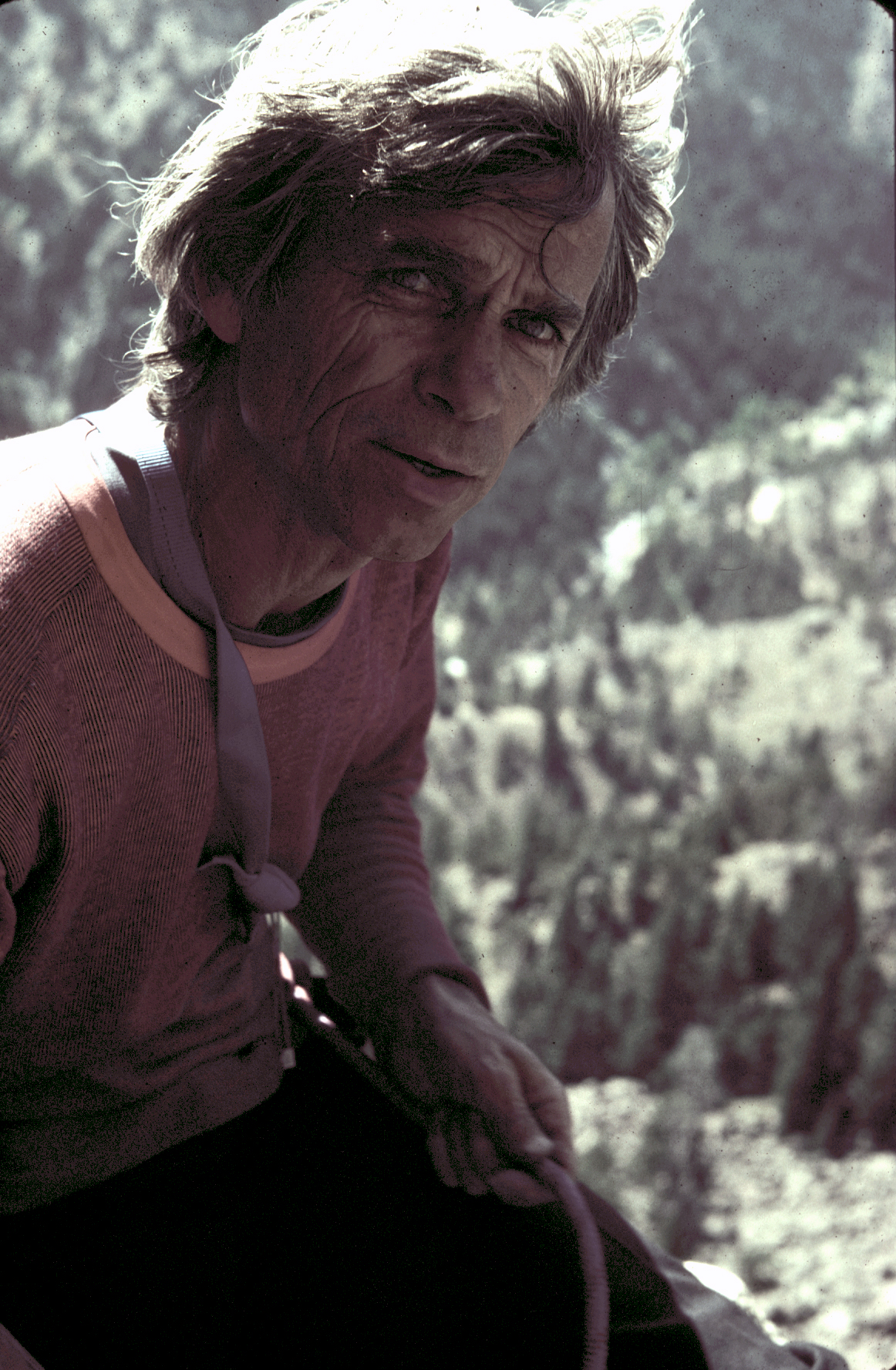
Bob Kamps in Colorado in the 1970s

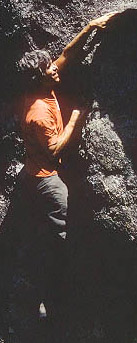
Bob Kamps bouldering in the Needles of the Black Hills in the 1970s.

Bob Kamps (1931 – 2 March 2005) was an American rock climber whose climbing career spanned five decades. Born in Wisconsin, he began climbing in California in 1955, and was a member of that cadre of Yosemite pioneers who first ascended many of its great walls in the 1950s and 1960s. He was particularly adept on steep rock faces, and was among the first to shift attention from aid climbing to free climbing. Over the years he made more than 3,100 climbs. Many were first ascents or first free ascents.

Kamps' interests ranged from ten-foot boulders to high mountain walls. He bouldered at Stoney Point at Chatsworth, California, for fifty years. His companions in the 1950s and 1960s included Royal Robbins, Yvon Chouinard, Mark Powell, and Dave Rearick. After his death in 2005, a memorial service was held there. Kamps bouldered almost everywhere he climbed for any length of time, and John Gill joined him on numerous occasions in the Tetons and Black Hills.

Kamps climbed extensively in California, Arizona, Colorado, Wyoming, and South Dakota. His climbing partners included Mark Powell, Dave Rearick, Tom Higgins, and Yvon Chouinard. In the Tetons in 1958, Kamps teamed with Chouinard to make the first ascent of the imposing Satisfaction Buttress; but the two were turned back the following year on an attempt on the forbidding north face of the Crooked Thumb on 12,325-foot (3,757 m) Teewinot Mountain, when Chouinard's aid pitons pulled out of the decomposing rock and he took a 150-foot (46 m) fall through open space, held on belay by Kamps. (The climb was completed seven years later by Pete Cleveland).

In the summer of 1960, Kamps and Dave Rearick received permission from the National Park Service to attempt to scale the famous Diamond on 14,255-foot (4,345 m) Longs Peak near Estes Park, Colorado. There were existing routes to the side of the massive, slightly overhanging wall, but none up the center. Their successful ascent took over two days, and involved both aid climbing and free climbing. After descending the two climbers were given a parade through Estes Park, and the feat was reported in newspapers throughout the US and in Time magazine.

Kamps and Powell made the first free ascent of a route called Chingadera on Tahquitz Rock in California in February 1967. Kamps's placement of a critical protective bolt while on lead, using a manual twist drill, earned him the admiration of later generations of climbers, who have found even clipping onto the bolt is difficult. The climb was an early 5.11. That same year, Kamps and Higgins - both highly proficient on slabs and faces with tiny holds - climbed Lucky Streaks on Fairview Dome in Tuolumne Meadows, (Hard 5.10).

The granite Needles of the Black Hills of South Dakota – slim spires ranging from twenty to well over a hundred feet in height – were a favorite summer playground for Kamps. Steep and adorned with crystalline nubbins, frequently the rock requires the sort of face-climbing of which Kamps was a master. His many first ascents include Sore Thumb (5.9 - 1965) and Freak's Fright (5.10 – 1967). In 1971 the American Alpine Club published his Climber's Guide to the Needles in the Black Hills of South Dakota that was based on the earlier work of Jan and Herb Conn. In turn it became the basis of Paul Piana's Touch the Sky.

He was always a traditional climber, on sight, ground up, even when he enjoyed the sport routes of others. He led 5.10 and 5.11 climbs well into his 70s. He was noted for his intelligence, charm, and sly wit. Kamps died in March 2005 of a massive heart attack while on the wall of a climbing gym. He is survived by his wife, Bonnie.

== Notable ascents ==
- 1958 Satisfaction Buttress Disappointment Peak Grand Teton NP WY (IV 5.9 A2) with Yvon Chouinard.
- 1959 North Face Middle Cathedral Rock, Yosemite Valley, CA (VI 5.9 A4), with Steve Roper and Chuck Pratt.
- 1960 The Blank Tahquitz Rock CA (5.10a) FFA with Tom Frost.
- 1960 D1 Longs Peak Rocky Mountain NP CO with Dave Rearick (V 5.8 A3).
- 1962 Dark Angel Arches NP UT (5.10a A2) with Dave Rearick.
- 1963 Blanketty Blank Tahquitz Rock CA (5.10c) FFA with Tom Higgins.
- 1963 Inverted Staircase Fairview Dome Yosemite NP CA (IV 5.10c) with Wally Reed.
- 1967 February Chingadera Tahquitz Rock CA (5.11a) FFA with Mark Powell.
- 1967 June Lucky Streaks Fairview Dome Yosemite NP CA (III 5.10c/d) with Tom Higgins.
