= South Face =

South Face may refer to:

- South Face (Charlotte Dome)
- South Face (Petit Grepon)
