= Owen-Spalding route =

Climbing route

- Location: Grand Teton, Wyoming, U.S.
- Coordinates: 43°44′28″N 110°48′09″W
- Climbing area: Teton Range
- Route type: Alpine
- Vertical gain: 2,175 ft (663 m)
- Pitches: 1
- Technical grade: 5.4
- NCCS grade: III
- First ascent: William O. Owen, Franklin Spalding, Frank Peterson, and John Shive
- First free ascent: August 11, 1898

The Owen-Spalding route is a rock climbing route on Grand Teton (13,775 feet (4,199 m)), the highest peak in the Teton Range in Grand Teton National Park in the U.S. state of Wyoming.

== History ==
It was pioneered by William O. Owen, Franklin Spalding, Frank Peterson, and John Shive on August 11, 1898, during the mountain's first ascent. While Owen, who had made previous attempts in 1891 and 1897, organized the 1898 effort Spalding was the more experienced mountaineer and first on the summit.

== Description ==
The Owen-Spalding route begins at the lower saddle (11,600 ft (3,500 m)+), a high mountain pass between the Grand and Middle Teton peaks. Scrambling and sections of modest difficulty climbing leads to the upper saddle, with a sub-peak known as The Enclosure (13,300 ft (4,100 m)+) to the west and the west wall of Grand Teton to the east. From the Upper Saddle ropes are usually used by novices traversing exposed 2,000-foot (610 m) cliffs along the west flank, but the section is generally considered non-technical. Features such as the "Belly Roll" and "The Crawl", where climbers usually straddle a rock fin for several yards, lead to the Double Chimney. The chimneys, the most complex section of the climb and oftentimes icy, yield to a steep scramble to the summit. The descent may be down-climbed or rappeled using several fixed anchors.
