= North face (Grand Teton) =

North face of the Grand Teton
- Location: Grand Teton National Park, Wyoming, US
- Coordinates: 43.74110°N 110.802°W
- Climbing area: Grand Teton
- Route type: Trad/alpine
- Vertical gain: 3,000 feet
- Pitches: 12
- Technical grade: 5.8
- NCCS grade: IV
- First ascent: Paul Petzoldt, Jack Durrance & Eldon Petzoldt, 1936

The north face of the Grand Teton is a technical mixed climbing route. Today the route is usually climbed by a variation that avoids the chimneys which are often wet or icy. The route is recognized in the historic climbing text Fifty Classic Climbs of North America and considered a classic around the world.

== Gallery ==
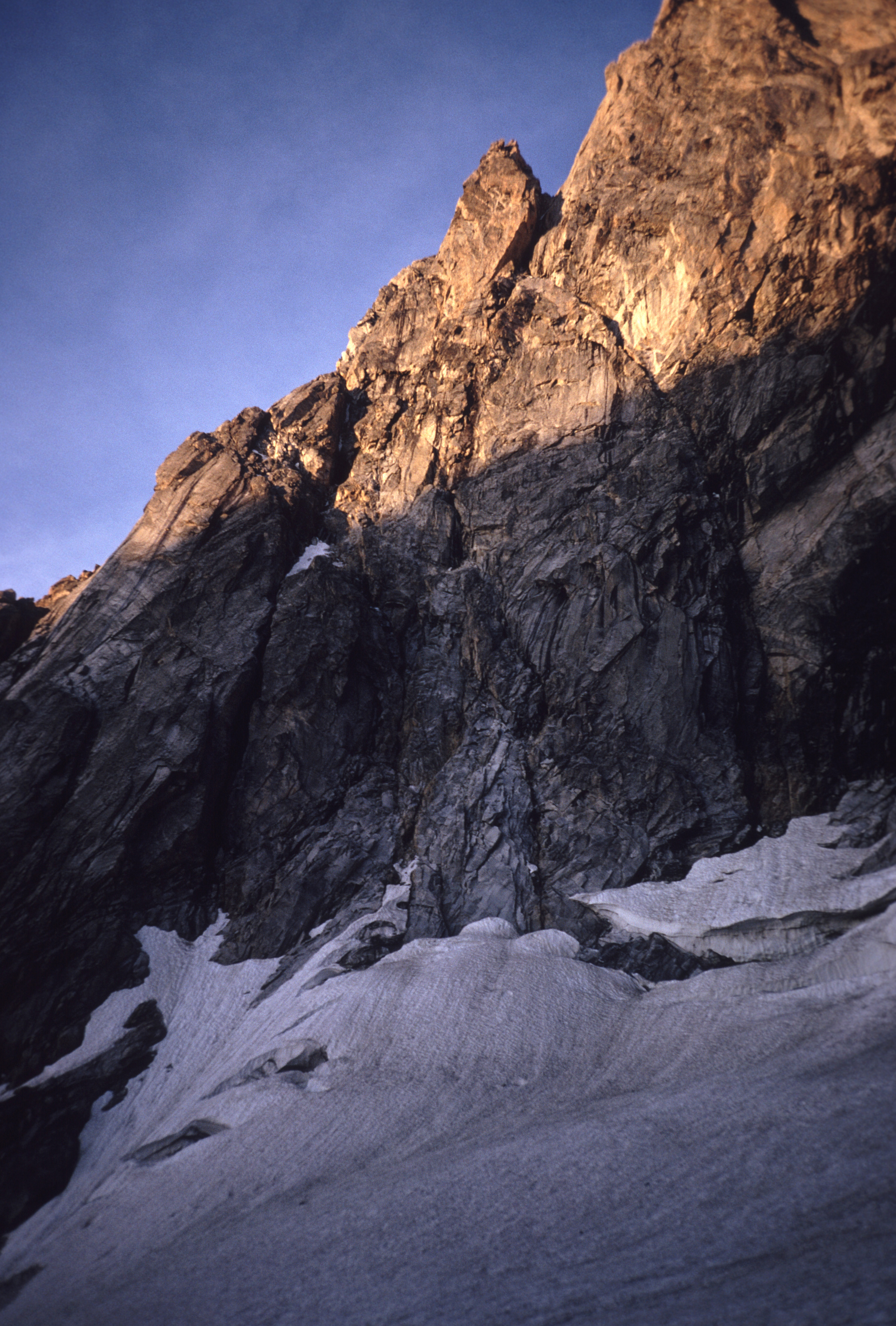
The route begins above the bergschrund about middle of the photo.

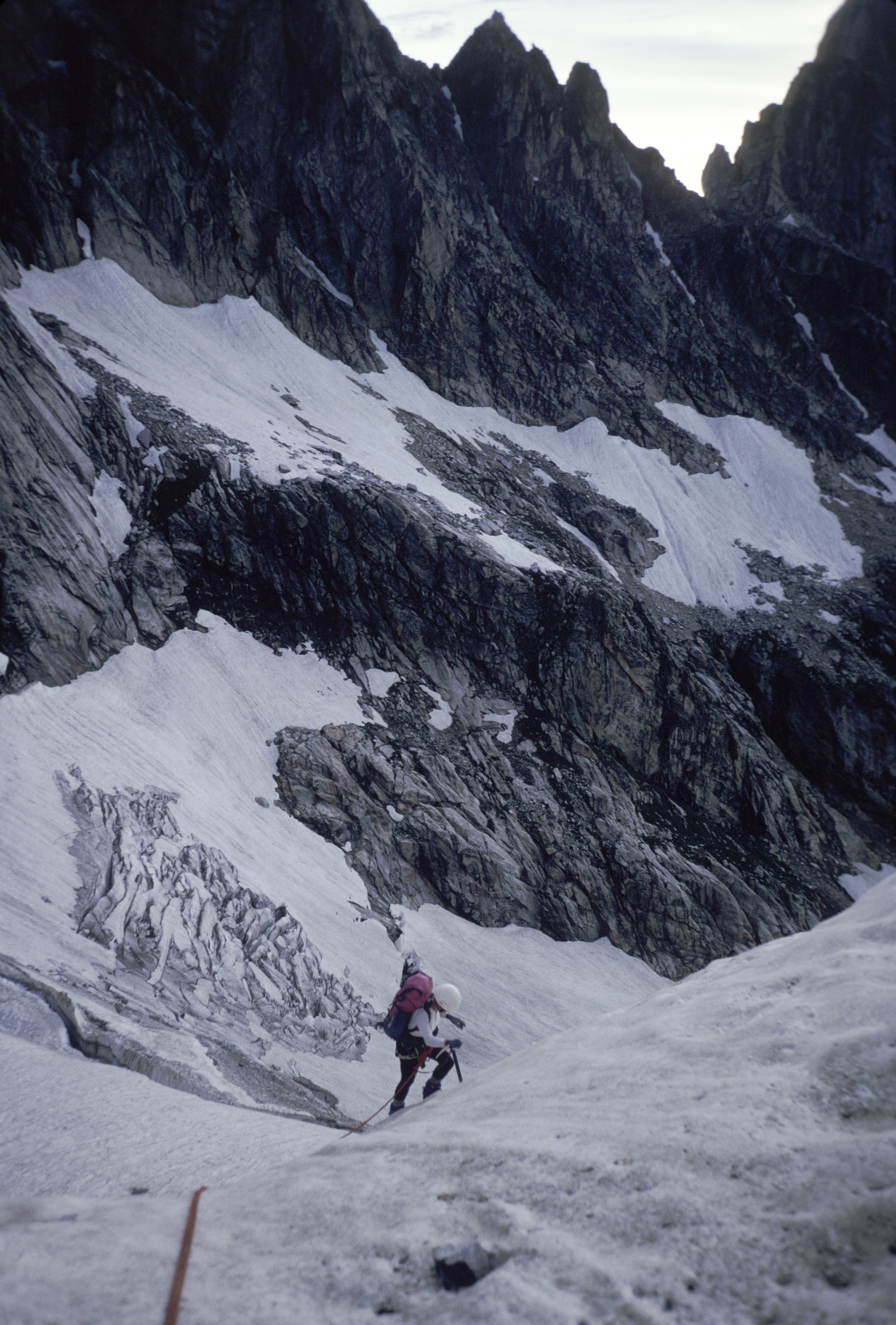
Approaching the route from the Teton Glacier

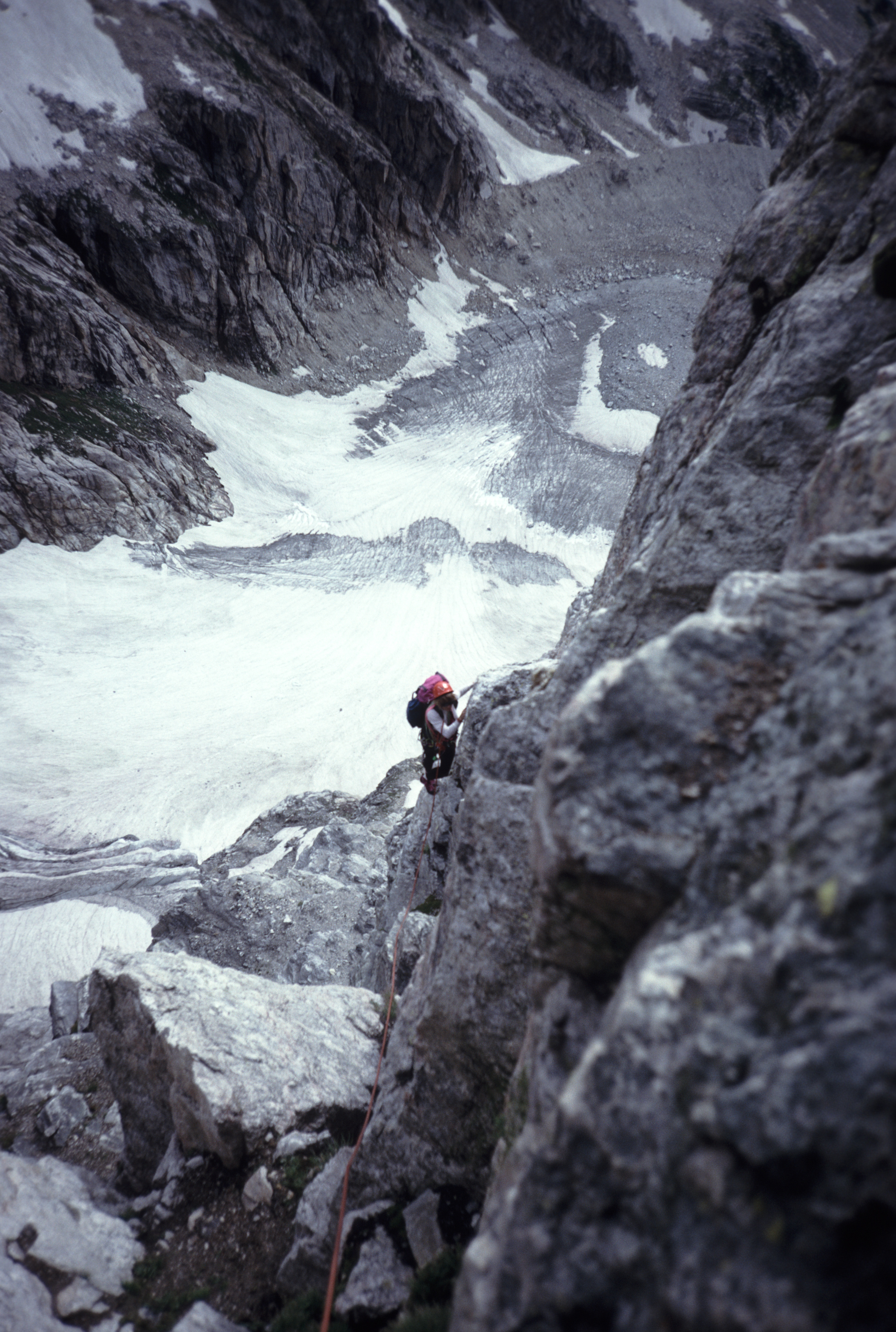
An early pitch

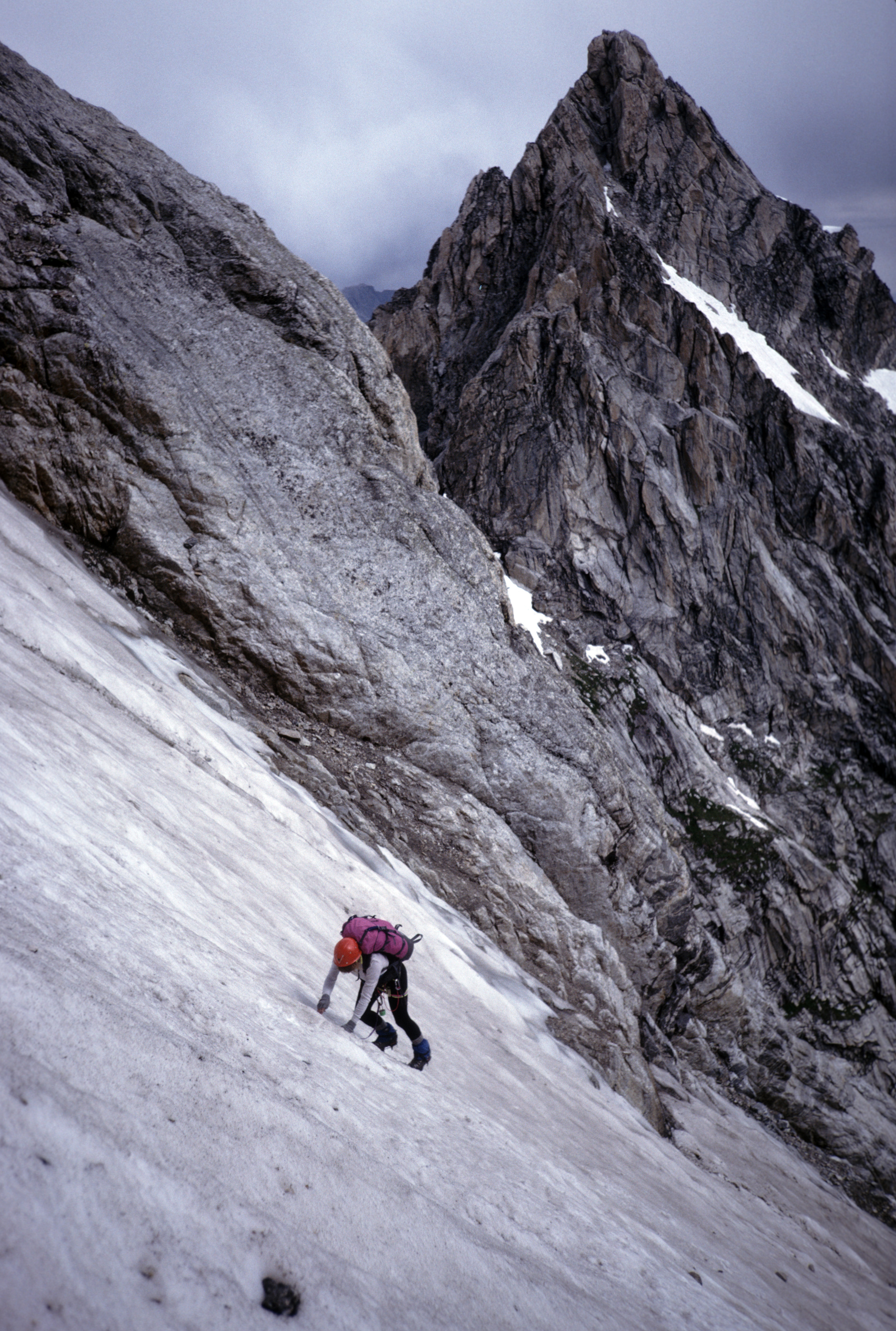
One of several snow sections

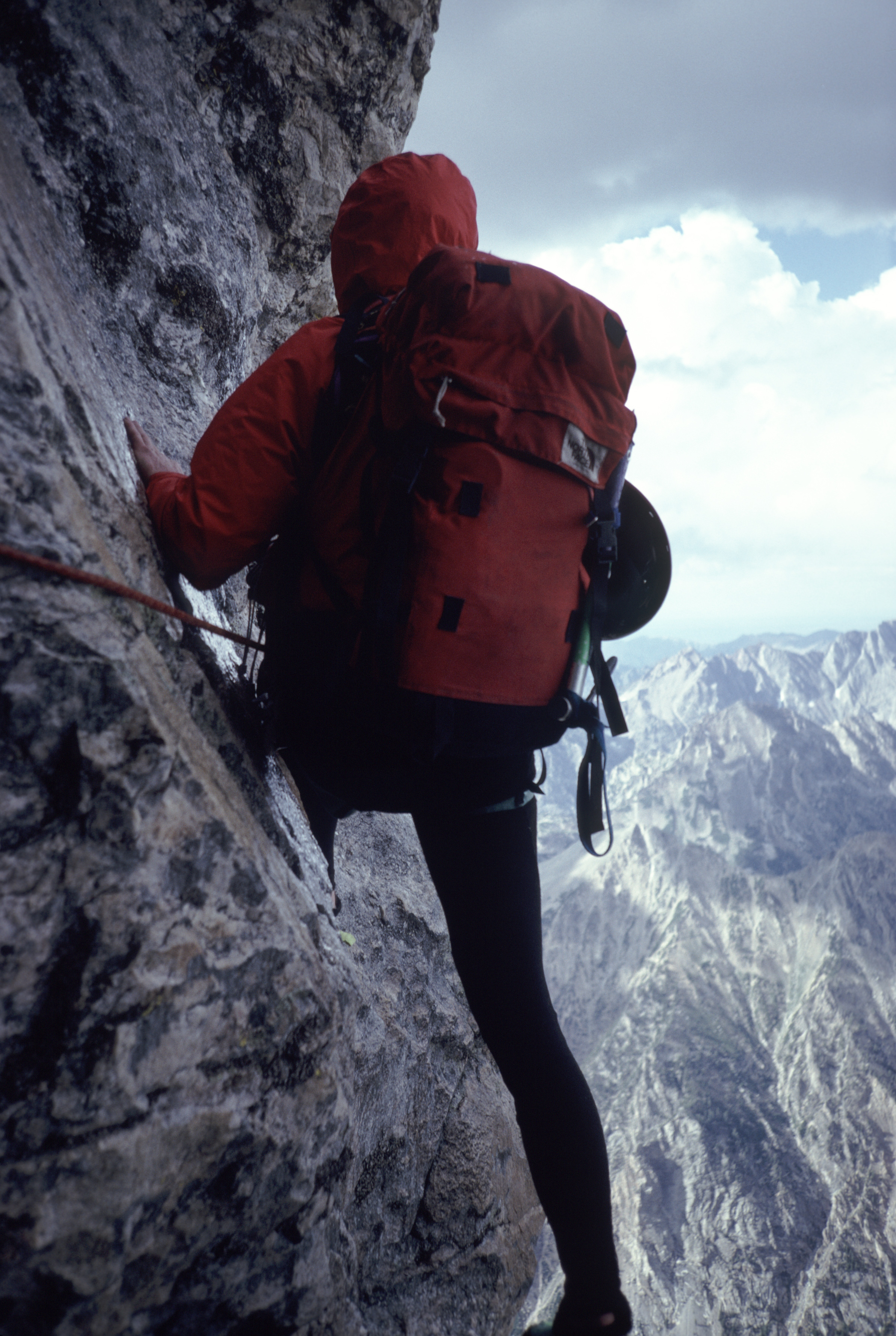
A tricky (usually wet) traverse pitch

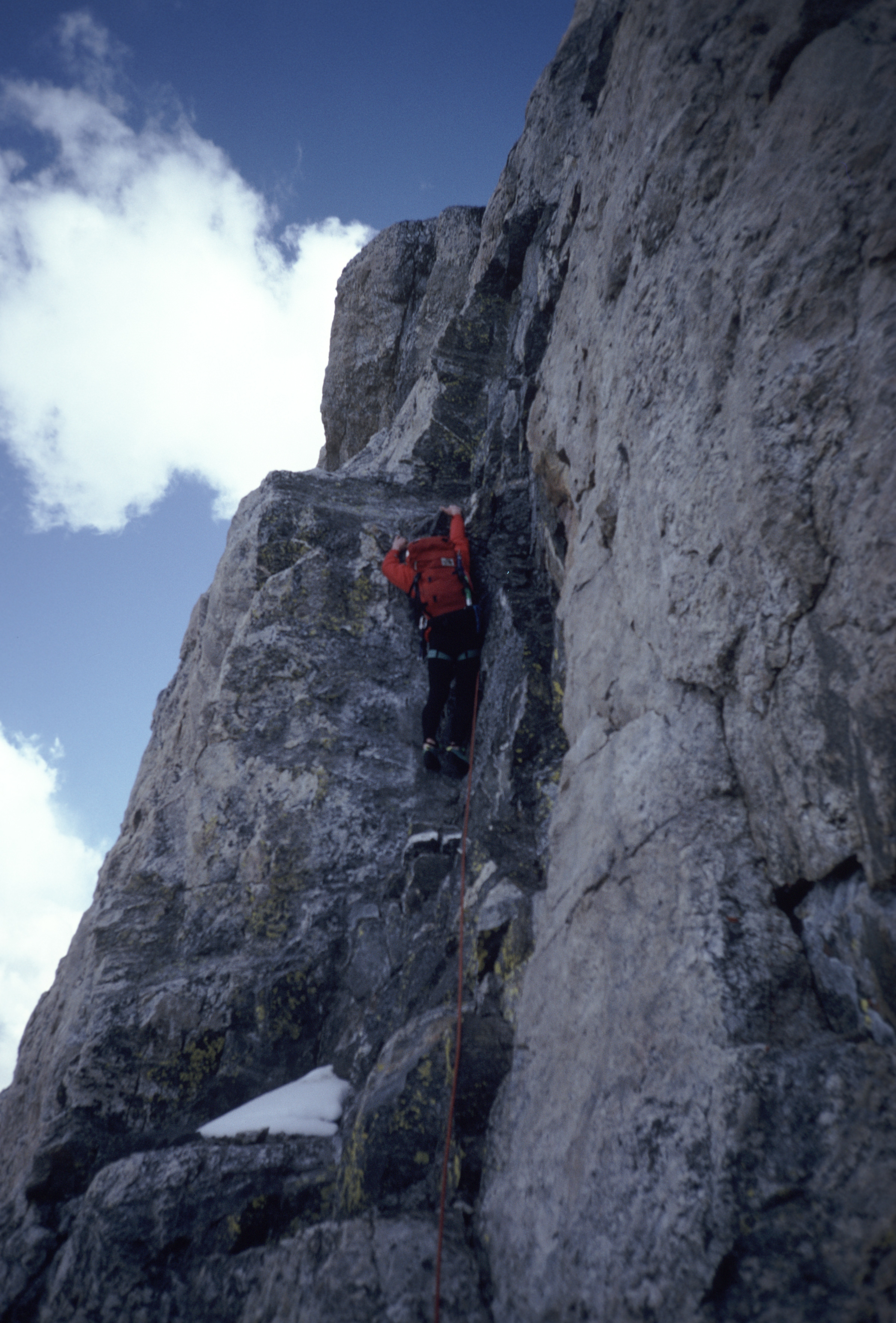
Starting the crux pitch

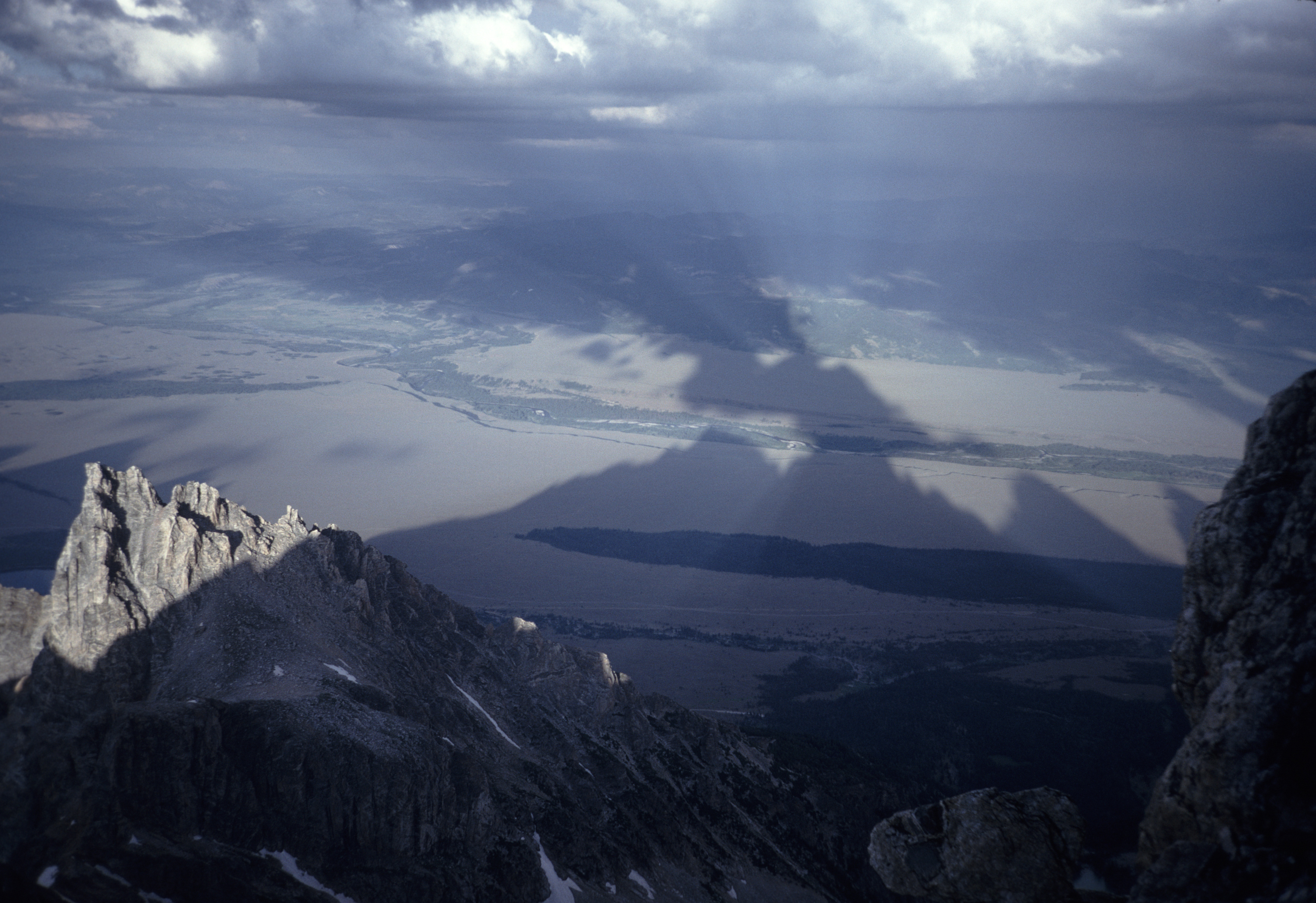
View from the summit looking east
