= Lake Charlotte =

Lake Charlotte or Charlotte Lake may refer to:

- Charlotte Lake (British Columbia)
- Charlotte Lake (California)
- Lake Charlotte, Nova Scotia, a lake and a community in the Halifax Regional Municipality, Nova Scotia
- Lake Charlotte (Florida), a lake in Highlands County, Florida
- Lake Charlotte (Martin County, Minnesota)
- Charlotte Lake (Todd County, Minnesota)
- Lake Charlotte (Wright County, Minnesota)
- Lake Charlotte, India, a lake in Matheran, India
