= Fifty Classic Climbs of North America =

1979 non-fiction book

- Cover of first paperback edition. Dick Long on the East Buttress of Middle Cathedral Rock.
- Author: Steve Roper; Allen Steck
- Language: English
- Subject: Climbing
- Genre: Non-fiction
- Publisher: Sierra Club Books
- Publication date: 1979
- Publication place: United States
- Media type: Print
- ISBN: 0-87156-292-8

Fifty Classic Climbs of North America is a 1979 climbing guidebook and history written by Steve Roper and Allen Steck. It is considered a classic piece of climbing literature, known to many climbers as simply "The Book", and has served as an inspiration for more recent climbing books, such as Mark Kroese's Fifty Favorite Climbs. Though much of the book's contents are now out of date, it is still recognized as a definitive text which goes beyond the traditional guidebook.

== History ==
The first edition was published in 1979, by Sierra Club Books in the United States and in Great Britain by the now-defunct Diadem Books. This was followed by a paperback printing by Random House in 1981. Two subsequent editions (with the same content) were published by Sierra Club Books in 1982 and 1996. Between 1979 and 1999 it sold nearly thirty thousand copies, a considerable achievement for a climbing guide book.

Reviewing the book in American Alpine Journal, Fred Beckey wrote: "Roper and Steck have presented a profile of what could be considered the Great American Dream climbs with a writing style that provides much Lebensraum for speculation and meditation. While reading, one is tempted to meditate: the challenge of the alpine adventure is always there; the dreams of the various pioneers sometimes filter through the narrative."

Roper and Steck received the American Alpine Club's 1995 Literary Award for the book and for their other works such as The Best of Ascent.

To choose the list of climbs, the coauthors solicited opinions from a number of leading climbers of the era, narrowing a list of more than 100 climbs according to three basic criteria: that the peak or route appear striking from afar, have a noteworthy climbing history, and offer climbing of excellent quality. Precedence was given to climbing quality over appearance and appearance over historical significance. In order to judge the historical significance and continuing popularity, routes were limited for the most part to those first ascended before 1970. A lower limit on the length of the route, at 500 feet, was also established. Steck and Roper had personally ascended or attempted most of the selected routes.

The list of fifty climbs has served as a challenge to climbers, providing them with a "tick list" of challenging routes that span a wide section of western North America. Author Steve Roper has emphasized that the climbs were chosen from a list of about 120 climbs he and Steck considered classic, and are simply '50 classic climbs', not 'the 50 classics'. Nevertheless, the book brought great popularity to many of the routes it featured, and prospective climbers pursuing one of the "fifty classics" often found crowds on the more accessible climbs and unexpected company on the more remote routes, earning them the nickname "Fifty Crowded Climbs".

No one person has yet climbed all fifty routes. This has been attributed to the difficulty of some of the Alaskan and Canadian routes (the Hummingbird Ridge of Mount Logan has never been repeated by the original route).

== Fifty Classics ==
The fifty climbs included in the book are listed below, along with their grades as given in the first edition, which may differ from those found in a modern guidebook due to changes in climbing standards or route conditions.

=== Alaska and the Yukon ===
1. Mount Saint Elias, Abruzzi Ridge, FA: 1897
2. Mount Fairweather, Carpé Ridge, FA: Allen Carpé and Terris Moore in 1931
3. Mount Hunter, West Ridge, FA: Fred Beckey, Henry Meybohm, and Heinrich Harrer in 1954
4. Denali, Cassin Ridge, FA: Riccardo Cassin and five others in 1961
5. The Moose's Tooth, West Ridge, FA in 1964
6. Mount Huntington, West Face 5.9 A2 with “severe snow and ice”, FA: 1966
7. Mount Logan, Hummingbird Ridge, The original route has not been repeated since its 1965 FA Notable Ascent: Dave Nettle and Geoff Creighton 1990 via Thunderbird Variation which tackles all the major portions of the route, minus the horizontal ridge traverse at the beginning
8. Middle Triple Peak, East Buttress VI 5.9 A3, FA: Mike Graber, Alan Long, Andy Embick, and George Schunk in 1977.

=== Western Canada ===
9. Mount Sir Donald, Northwest Arete III 5.2, FA: A. M. Bartleet and Val Fynn in 1909
10. Bugaboo Spire, East Ridge III 5.7, FA: John Turner, David Isles, Dick Sykes, and Dave Craft in 1958
11. South Howser Tower, West Buttress V 5.8 A2 or 5.10, FA: Fred Beckey and Yvon Chouinard in 1961
12. Mount Robson, Wishbone Arete V 5.6, FA: Don Claunch, Mike Sherrick, and Harvey Firestone in 1955
13. Mount Edith Cavell, North Face IV 5.7, FA: Yvon Chouinard and Fred Beckey in 1961
14. Mount Alberta, Japanese Route V 5.6, FA: Maki Yūkō and eight other climbers in 1925
15. Mount Temple, East Ridge IV 5.7, FA: Hans Wittich and Otto Stegmaier in 1931
16. Mount Waddington, South Face V 5.7, FA: Fritz Wiessner and Bill House in 1936
17. Devils Thumb, East Ridge IV 5.6, FA: Fred Beckey, Bob Craig, and Cliff Schmidtke in 1946
18. Lotus Flower Tower V 5.8 A2 or 5.10, FA: Tom Frost, Sandy Bill, and Jim McCarthy in 1968

=== The Pacific Northwest ===
19. Mount Rainier, Liberty Ridge, FA: Ome Daiber, Arnie Campbell, and Jim Borrow in 1935
20. Forbidden Peak, West Ridge II 5.6, FA: 1940
21. Mount Shuksan, Price Glacier, FA: Fred Beckey, Jack Schwabland, and Bill Granston in 1945
22. Slesse Mountain, Northeast Buttress V 5.9 A2, FA: Fred Beckey, Steve Marts, and Eric Bjornstad in 1963
23. Mount Stuart, North Ridge III 5.9, FA: Don Claunch and John Rupley in 1956
24. Liberty Bell Mountain, Liberty Crack V 5.9 A3 or 5.13a/b, FA: Steve Marts, Fred Stanley, and Don McPherson in 1965

=== Wyoming ===
25. Devil’s Tower, Durrance Route II 5.6-5.7, FA: Jack Durrance and Harrison Butterworth in 1938
26. Grand Teton, North Ridge IV 5.7, FA: Fritiof Fryxell and Robert Underhill in 1931
27. Grand Teton, Direct Exum Ridge III 5.6, FA: Jack Durrance and Kenneth Henderson in 1936
28. Grand Teton, North Face IV 5.8, FA: Dick Pownall Ray Garner, and Art Gilkey in 1949
29. Mount Moran, Direct South Buttress IV 5.7 A3, FA: Richard Emerson, Don Decker, and Leigh Ortenburger in 1953
30. Pingora, Northeast Face IV 5.8, FA: Harry Daley and Jim Yensan in 1962
31. Wolfs Head, East Ridge II 5.5, FA: William Plummer and William Buckingham in 1959

=== Colorado ===
32. Crestone Needle, Ellingwood Ledges III 5.7, FA: Albert Ellingwood led Eleanor Davis, Stephen Hart, and Marion Warner in 1925
33. Hallett Peak, Northcutt-Carter Route III 5.7 (now 5.10 R), FA: Ray Northcutt and Harvey Carter in 1956
34. Petit Grepon, South Face III 5.8, FA: unknown climber in the early 1960s
35. Longs Peak, The Diamond, D1 V 5.7 A4 or 5.12a, FA: Dave Rearick and Bob Kamps

=== Utah & New Mexico ===
36. Shiprock, III 5.7 A2 or 5.9, FA: Dave Brower, Bestor Robinson, Raffi Bedayn, and John Dyer in 1936. Closed to climbing since 1970.
37. Castleton Tower, Kor-Ingalls Route III 5.9, FA: Layton Kor and Huntley Ingalls in 1961
38. Fisher Towers, The Titan, Finger of Fate, IV 5.8 A3, FA: Layton Kor, George Hurley, and Huntley Ingalls in 1962

=== California ===
39. The Royal Arches, Royal Arches Route III 5.6 A1 or 5.9, FA: Morgan Harris, Ken Adam, and Kenneth Davis in 1936
40. Lost Arrow Spire, Lost Arrow Spire Tip III 5.5 A3 or 5.10 A2, FA: Anton Nelson and John Salathé in 1947
41. Sentinel Rock, Steck-Salathe Route V 5.9 A3, FA: Allen Steck and John Salathé in 1950
42. Middle Cathedral Rock, East Buttress IV 5.9 A1 or 5.10, FA: Warren Harding, Bob Swift, and Jack Davis in 1955
43. Half Dome, Northwest Face VI 5.9 A3 or 5.12, FA: Royal Robbins, Mike Sherrick, and Jerry Gallwas in 1957
44. El Capitan, Nose Route VI 5.11 A3, FA: Warren Harding, Wayne Merry, and George Whitmore in 1958
45. El Capitan, Salathé Wall VI 5.10 A3, FA: Royal Robbins, Chuck Pratt, and Tom Frost in 1961
46. Mount Whitney, East Face III 5.7, FA: Robert Underhill, Norman Clyde, Jules Eichorn, and Glen Dawson in 1931
47. Fairview Dome, North Face III-IV 5.9, FA: Wally Reed and Chuck Pratt in 1958
48. Clyde Minaret, Southeast Face IV 5.8, FA: Allen Steck, Dick Long, John Evans, and Chuck Wilts in 1963
49. Charlotte Dome, South Face III 5.7, FA: Galen Rowell, Chris Jones, and Fred Beckey in 1970
50. Lover's Leap, Traveler Buttress II 5.9, FA: Steve Thompson, Gordon Webster, and Steve Roper in 1966
