= Abruzzi Ridge =

Abruzzi Ridge may refer to:

- Abruzzi Spur or Ridge, on the South-East Ridge of K2
- Abruzzi Ridge (Mount Saint Elias)
