= Clearing Winter Storm, Yosemite National Park =

1930s photograph by Ansel Adams

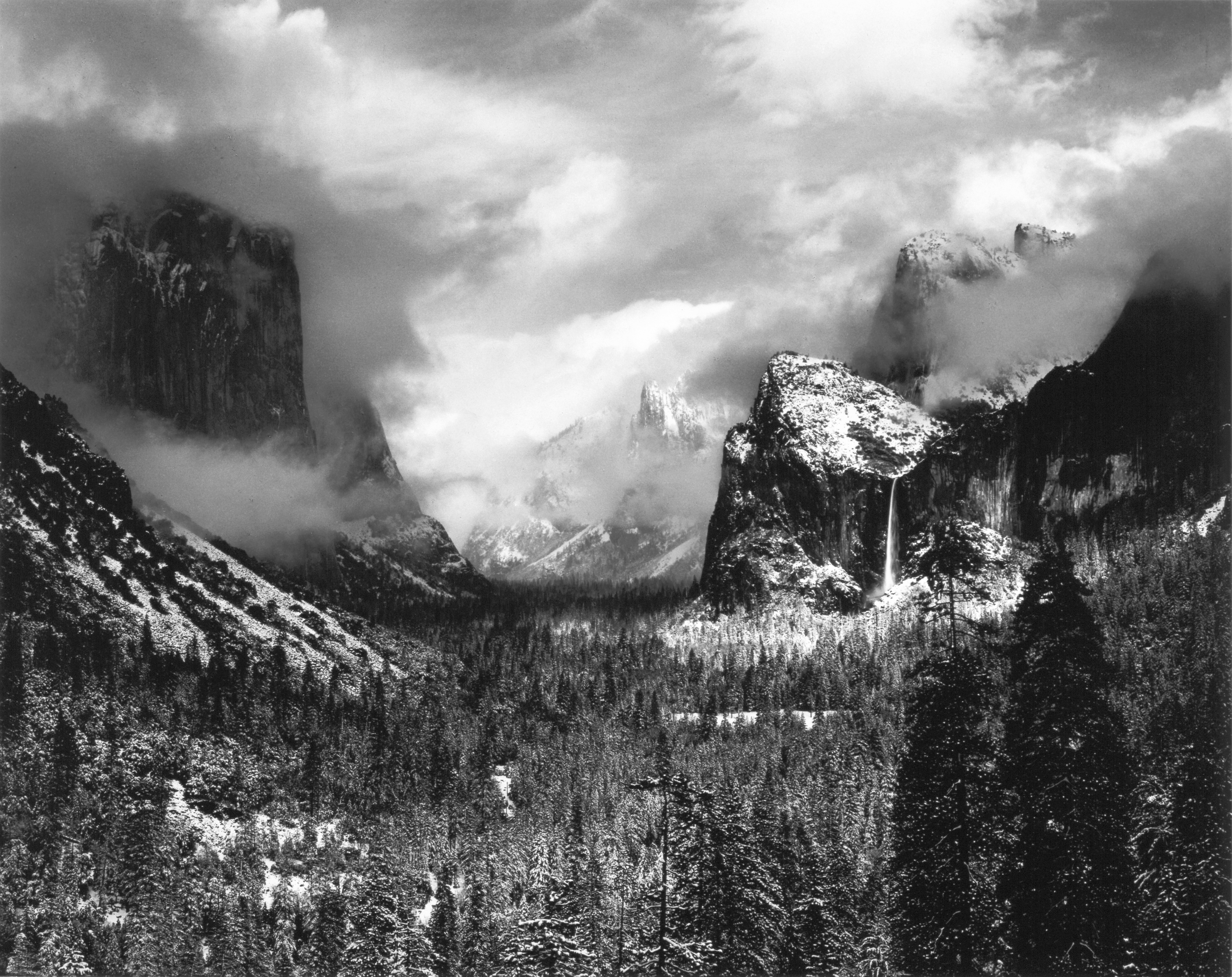
Clearing Winter Storm, Yosemite Valley (c. 1937) by Ansel Adams

Clearing Winter Storm, Yosemite National Park, California is a black and white photograph taken by Ansel Adams, c. 1937. It is part of a series of natural landscapes photographs that Adams took from Inspiration Point, at Yosemite Valley, since the 1930s.

== History and description ==
This became the most famous photograph taken by Adams at the Yosemite National Park, depicting several natural landmarks visible from that view point, namely El Capitan, Bridalveil Falls, Cathedral Rocks, and Half Dome, seen at the left, all of which also appear in other of his pictures. Some of his early photographs depict that landscape at Summer, but this one was clearly taken in Winter. The moment when a snow storm is clearing, allowing the view of the majestic landscape of Yosemite Valley, with their references and the vegetation visible, still covered with some snow, made this one of his most memorable photographs.

Adams stated that “While living in Yosemite I had great opportunity to follow the light and the storms, hoping always to encounter exciting situations. There were hundreds of spectacular weather events over the years, but the opportunities to photograph them were limited by accidents of time and place...” Adams took the picture on a December, possibly in 1937, just as a rain turned snow storm was beginning to clear away. He explained that his viewpoint had been motivated in part by the landscape: "At this location one cannot move more than a hundred feet or so to the left without reaching the edge of the almost perpendicular cliffs above the Merced River. Moving the same distance to the right would interpose a screen of trees or require an impractical position on the road. Moving forward would invite disaster on a very steep slope falling to the east".

== Date ==
There has been controversy over the time when the photograph was taken, since Adams gave conflicting information. In his book Examples: The Making of 40 Photographs (1983), he claims that it was taken in 1940. In his following book, Ansel Adams: An Autobiography (1984), he states it was from 1944. This date was accepted until an early print with the date of 1938 was sold at Sotheby's in 2005. Mary Stuar Alinder suggested the date of December 1935, in accordance with the investigation of Donald W. Olson.

== Art market ==
A mural-sized print of the photograph sold by $722,500 at Sotheby's New York, in June 2010, making it then the highest price reached by an Ansel Adams photograph.

== Public collections ==
There are prints of the photograph in several public collections, including the Museum of Modern Art, in New York, the Metropolitan Museum of Art, in New York, the National Gallery of Art, in Washington, D.C., the Philadelphia Museum of Art, the Art Institute of Chicago, the J. Paul Getty Museum, in Los Angeles, the Toledo Museum of Art, and the Amon Carter Museum of American Art, in Fort Worth, Texas.
