= Charlotte Dome =

Granite dome in California, U.S.

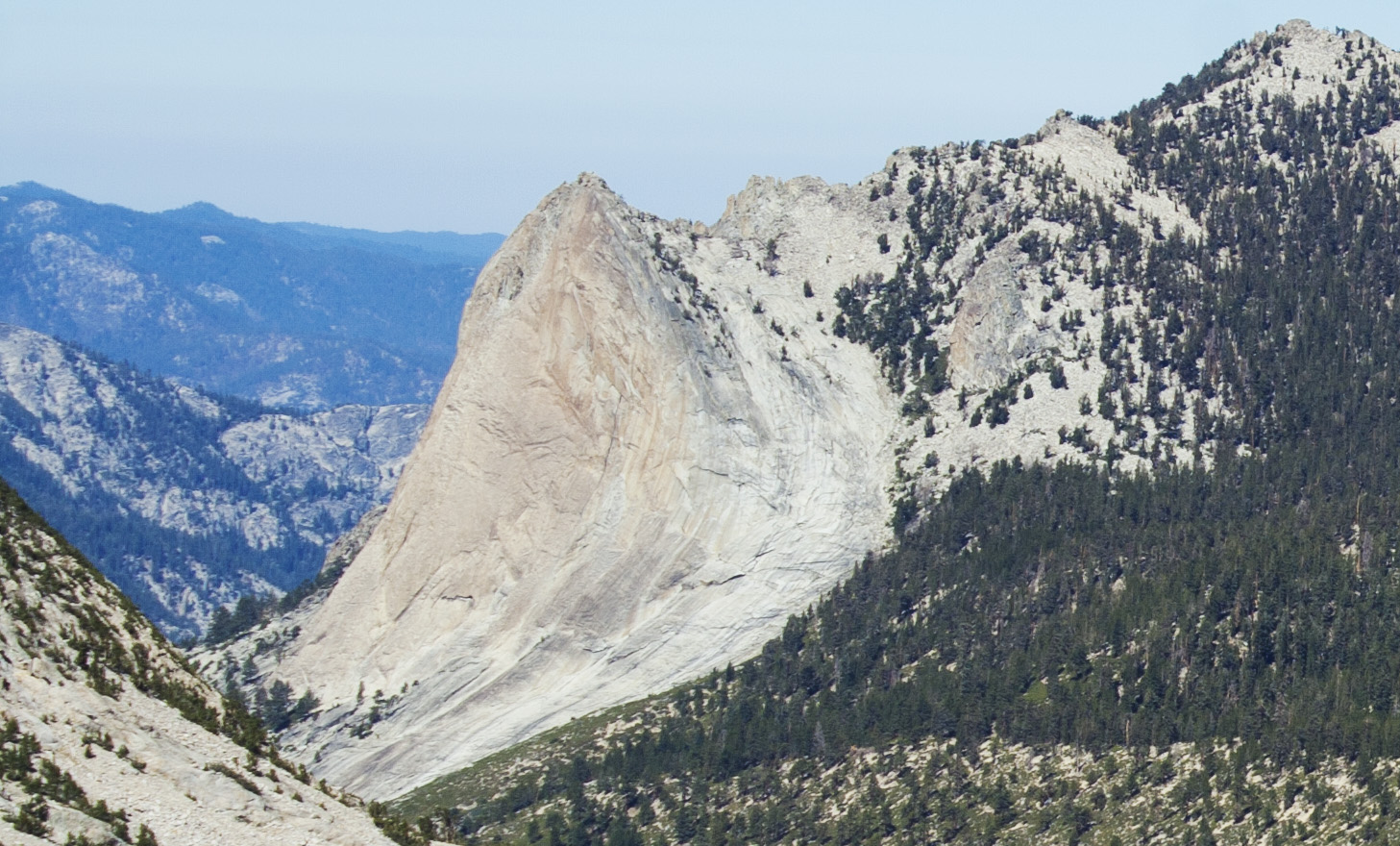

Highest point
- Elevation: 10,630+ ft (3240+ m) NGVD 29
- Prominence: 66 ft (20 m)
- Coordinates: 36°46′57″N 118°28′50″W

Geography
- Location within California
- Location: Kings Canyon National Park, Fresno County, California, U.S.
- Parent range: Sierra Nevada
- Topo map: USGS Mount Clarence King

Climbing
- Easiest route: Exposed scramble, class 3

Charlotte Dome is a granite dome in California's Kings Canyon National Park. It lies to the southeast of Glacier Monument and north of Bubbs Creek. It is most easily accessed from the Onion Valley trailhead to the east. The South Face Route is featured in Fifty Classic Climbs of North America. This climb is a grade III, class 5.7.

== See also ==
- Charlotte Lake
