= Petit Grepon =

Rock formation in Colorado, United States

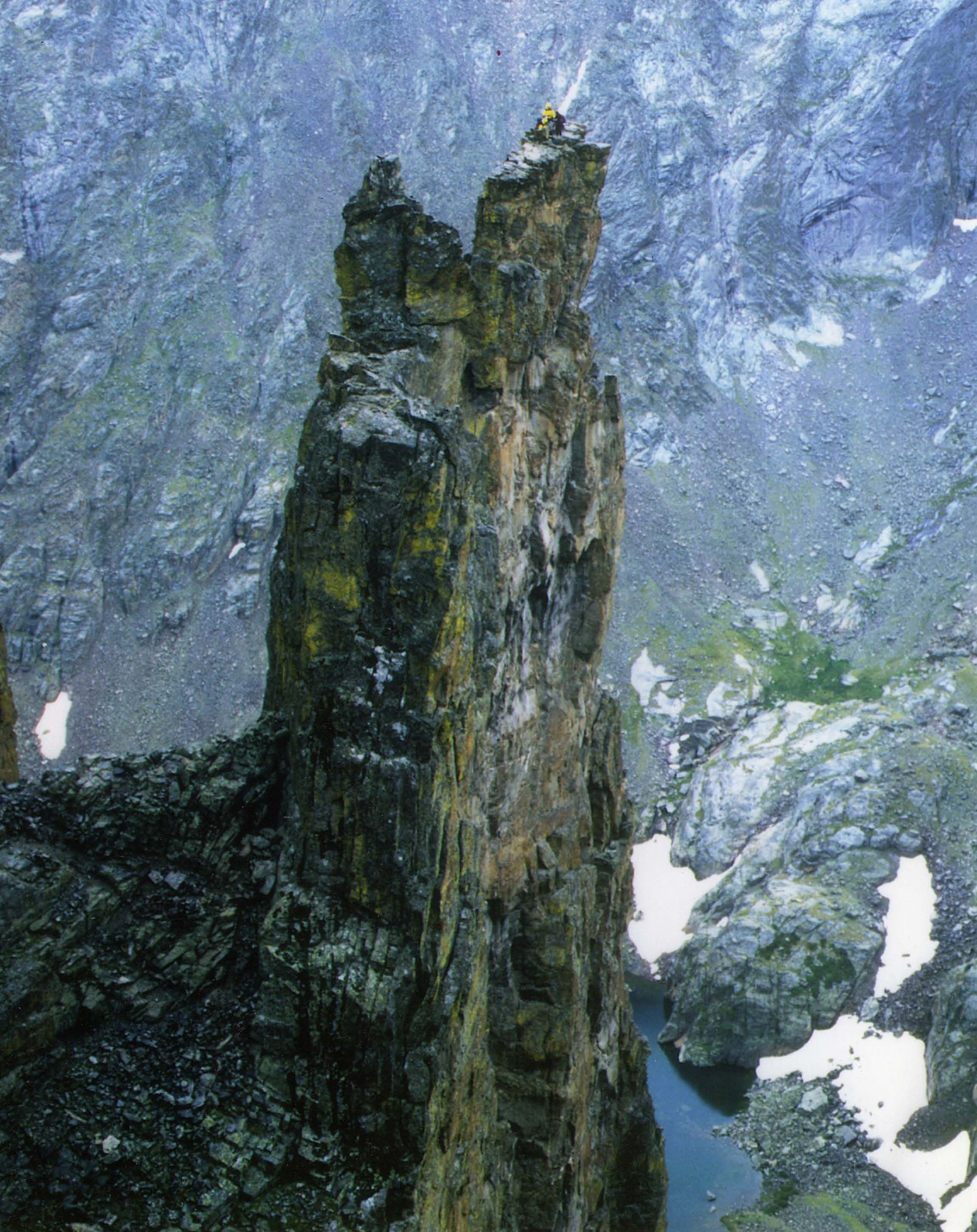
- Climbers atop Petit Grepon, as seen from The Sharkstooth

Highest point
- Elevation: 12,305 ft (3,751 m)
- Prominence: 300 ft (91 m)
- Isolation: 0.04 mi (0.064 km)
- Coordinates: 40°16′52″N 105°40′26″W

Geography
- Location within Colorado
- Location: Rocky Mountain National Park, Larimer County, Colorado, U.S.
- Parent range: Front Range
- Topo map(s): USGS 7.5' topographic map McHenrys Peak, Colorado

Climbing
- First ascent: Bill Buckingham & Art Davidson, 1961.

Petit Grepon is a semi-detached spire in Colorado's Rocky Mountain National Park. It is one of the "Cathedral Spires" which also includes: Sharkstooth, The Saber, and The Foil. The South Face route of Petit Grepon is described in the historic climbing text Fifty Classic Climbs of North America and considered a classic around the world.

== Climate ==
According to the Köppen climate classification system, the spire is located in an alpine subarctic climate zone with cold, snowy winters, and cool to warm summers. Due to its altitude, it receives precipitation all year, as snow in winter, and as thunderstorms in summer, with a dry period in late spring.

== See also ==
- List of Colorado mountain ranges
- List of Colorado mountain summits
  - List of Colorado fourteeners
  - List of Colorado 4000 meter prominent summits
  - List of the most prominent summits of Colorado
- List of Colorado county high points
