= North Ridge (Grand Teton) =

North Ridge of the Grand Teton
- Location: Grand Teton National Park, Wyoming, United States
- Coordinates: 43.74110°N 110.802°W
- Climbing area: Grand Teton
- Route type: Trad/Alpine
- Vertical gain: 1,200 feet
- Pitches: 10
- Technical grade: 5.8
- NCCS grade: IV
- First ascent: Robert L. M. Underhill & Fritiof Fryxell, 1931.

The North Ridge of the Grand Teton is a technical rock climbing location up the Grand Teton in Wyoming. The route is recognized in the historic climbing text Fifty Classic Climbs of North America and considered a classic around the world.
