= The Sharkstooth =

Mountain in the state of Colorado

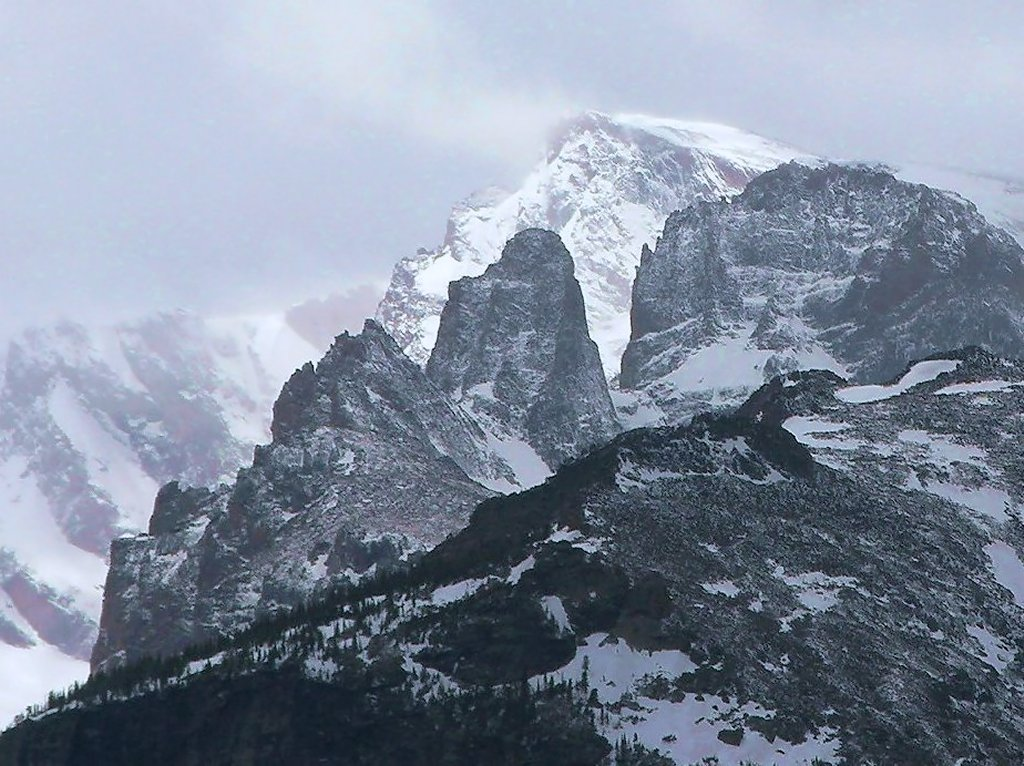
- Northeast aspect, centered (Taylor Peak in background)

Highest point
- Elevation: 12,630 ft (3,850 m)
- Prominence: 394 ft (120 m)
- Parent peak: Taylor Peak (13,158 ft)
- Isolation: 0.54 mi (0.87 km)
- Coordinates: 40°16′51″N 105°40′28″W

Geography
- Location within Colorado Location within the United States
- Country: United States
- State: Colorado
- County: Larimer
- Protected area: Rocky Mountain National Park
- Parent range: Rocky Mountains; Front Range
- Topo map: USGS McHenrys Peak

Geology
- Rock age: Paleoproterozoic
- Rock type(s): Biotite schist and gneiss

Climbing
- Easiest route: East gully class 5.4 climbing

The Sharkstooth is a 12,630-foot-elevation (3,850-meter) mountain summit in Larimer County, Colorado, United States.

== Description ==
The Sharkstooth is set 1,500 feet east of the Continental Divide in the Front Range of the Rocky Mountains. It is in the "Cathedral Spires" area, and is the second-steepest point in Colorado. The summit is situated within Rocky Mountain National Park, approximately 11 miles (18 km) southwest of Estes Park. Precipitation runoff from the mountain drains into tributaries of Glacier Creek which in turn is a tributary of the Big Thompson River. Topographic relief is significant with the summit rising 2,200 feet (670 meters) above Loch Vale in one mile. The landforms's toponym has been officially adopted by the United States Board on Geographic Names.

== Climate ==
According to the Köppen climate classification system, The Sharkstooth is located in an alpine subarctic climate zone with cold, snowy winters, and cool to warm summers. Due to its altitude, it receives precipitation all year, as snow in winter, and as thunderstorms in summer, with a dry period in late spring.

== Gallery ==
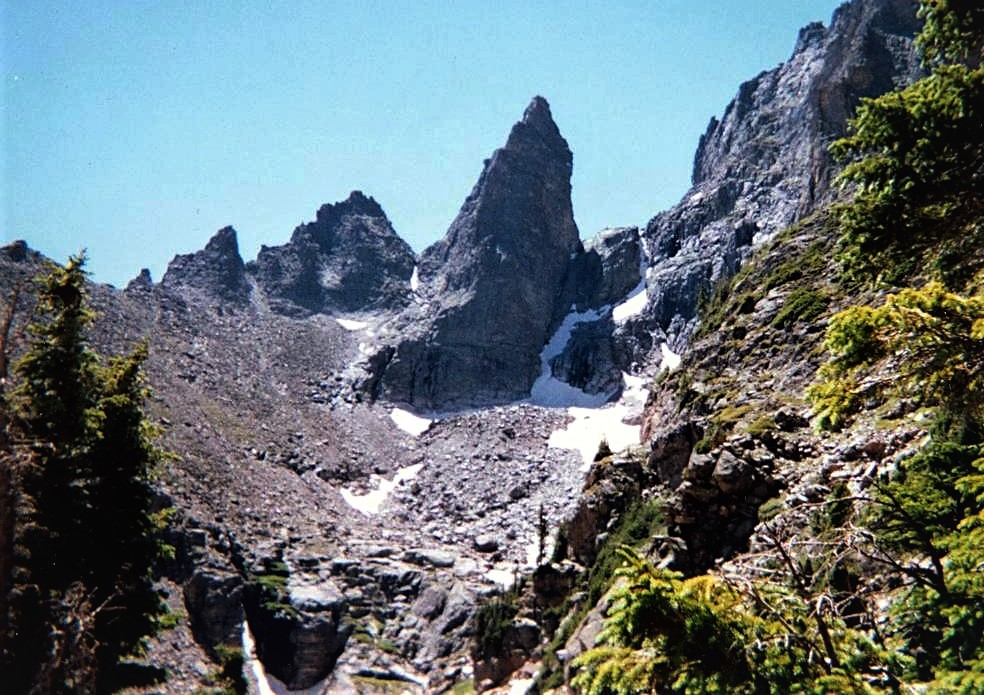
North aspect of Sharkstooth viewed from The Gash

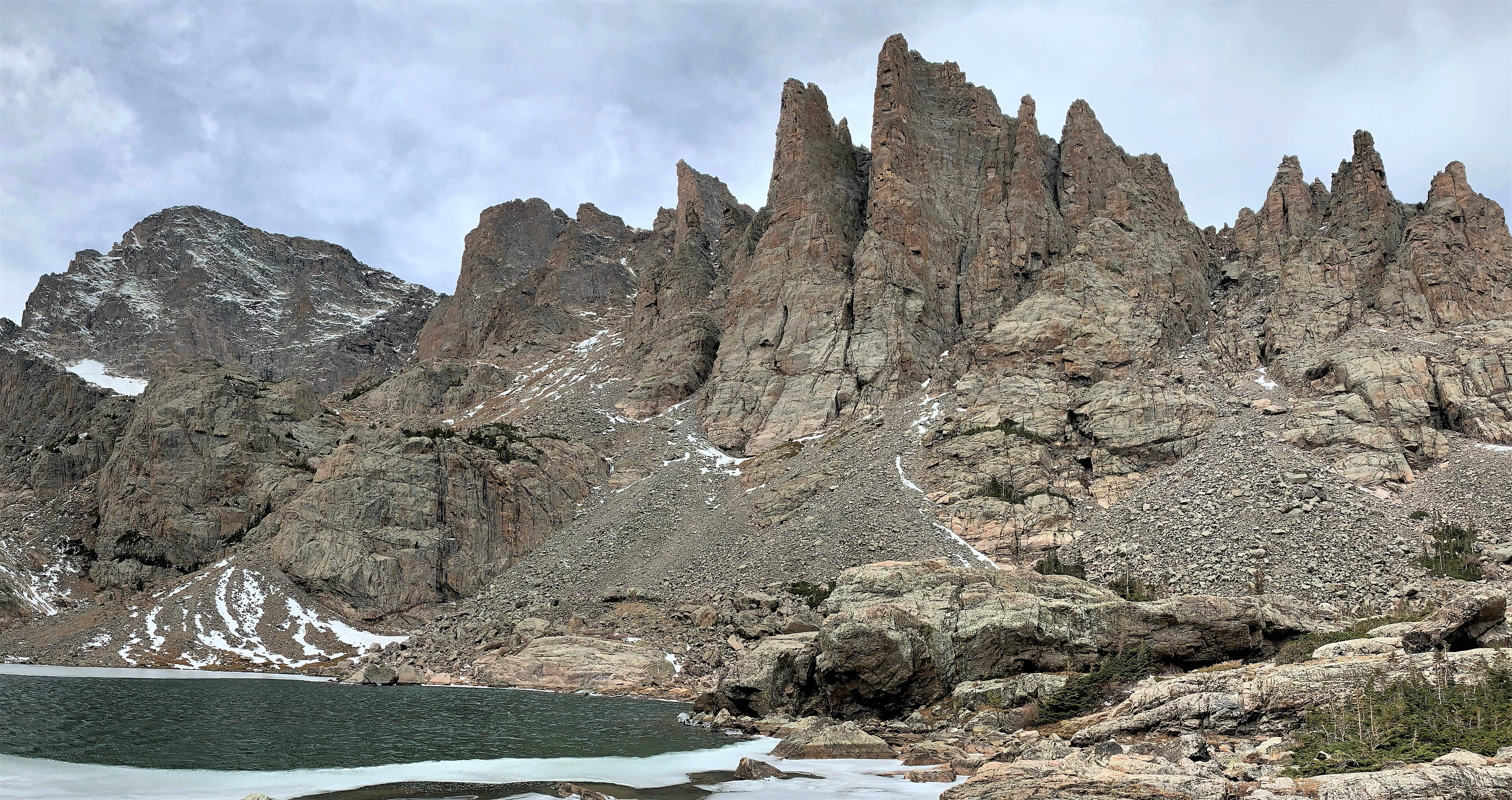
Cathedral Spires seen from Sky Pond. The apparent highest spire is "Saber" and immediately left of it is "Petit Grepon". At far left edge is Taylor Peak. Even though Sharkstooth is higher, it is hidden behind Saber.

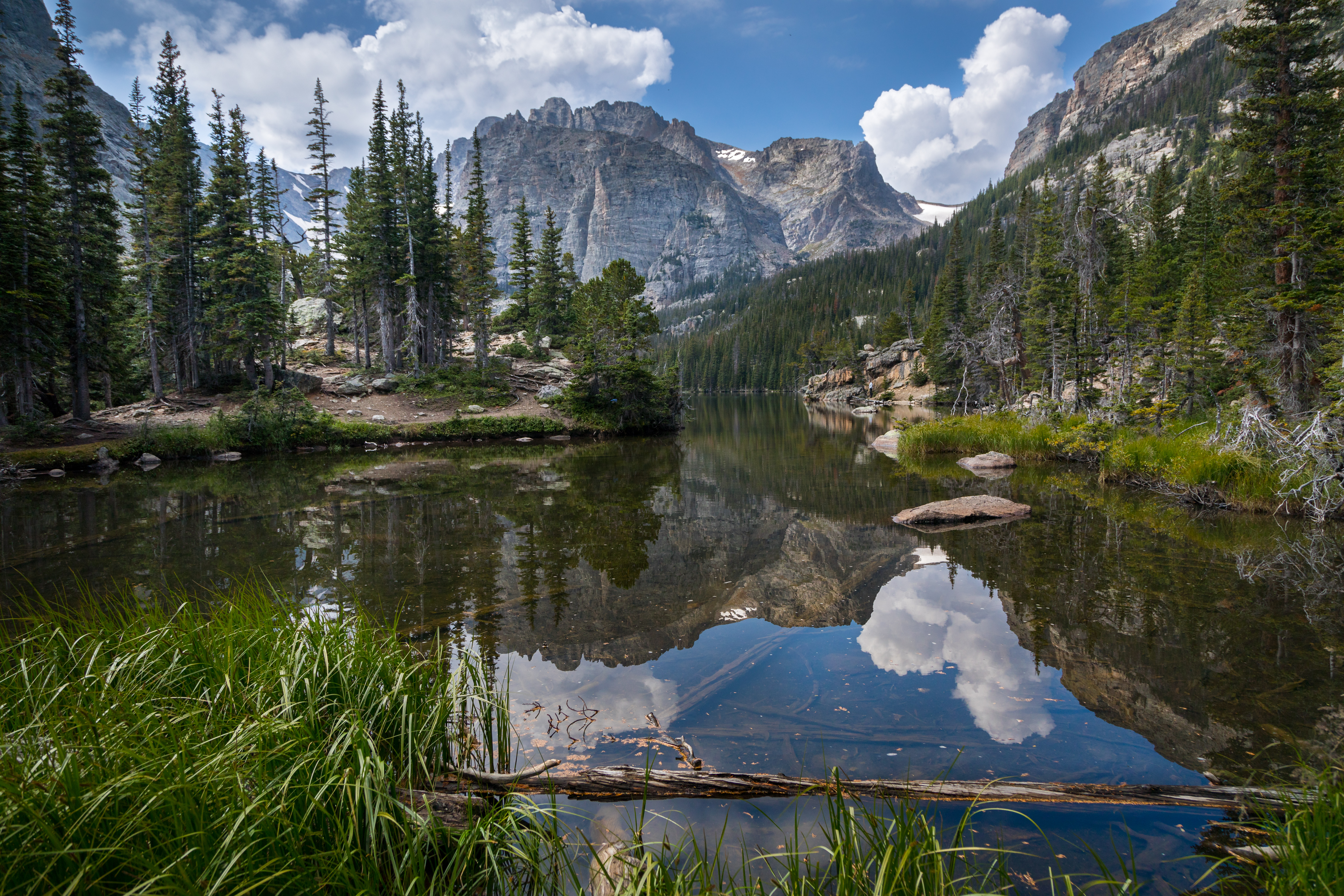
The top of Sharkstooth is the apparent highest point, view from The Loch

== See also ==
- List of peaks in Rocky Mountain National Park
- Mountains of Larimer County, Colorado
