= Kristen Ulmer =

American extreme skier (born 1966)

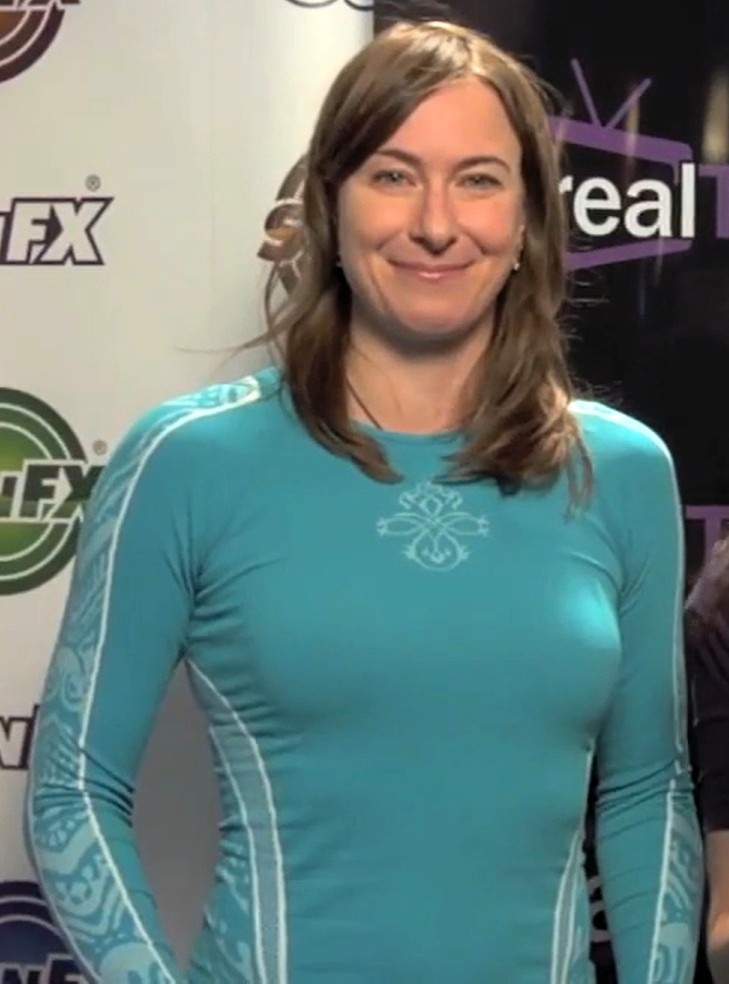
Ulmer in 2011

Kristen Ulmer (born September 8, 1966) is an American former mogul specialist within the United States Ski Team although is more known for being professional extreme skier. After retiring from professional skiing in 2003, she became an advocate for mental health and a coach on performance and anxiety.

== Early life and education ==
Born and raised in Henniker, New Hampshire, Ulmer moved to Salt Lake City, Utah in 1985 to attend the University of Utah. In 1986, she began competing in mogul skiing and in 1989 began filming extreme ski movies.

== Professional athletics ==
Ulmer's professional ski career spanned almost two decades. Ulmer became a mogul skier on the U.S. Ski Team in 1991. Very quickly she left mogul skiing behind and became recognized as the #1 female extreme skier in the world from 1991-2001 and starred in over 20 ski movies. Powder magazine named her as one of the greatest professional female skiers of her time. She was inducted into the U.S. Ski Hall of Fame in 2018.

She is known for jumping off high cliffs, performing flips, and ski mountaineering, including the first female ski descent of Wyoming's Grand Teton in 1997.

An avid rock and ice climber, paraglider pilot, adventure cyclist, and kiteboarder enthusiast, Ulmer was voted "Most Extreme Woman Athlete in North America" by the outdoor industry in a 2000 Women's Sports and Fitness magazine poll.

Ulmer retired from professional sports in 2003.

Alongside her ski career, Ulmer also contributed writing to magazines such as Skiing, Ski, Powder, Details, and Outside.

== Career post-retirement ==
Since her retirement in 2003, she has continued to study, teach, speak, and write on the subjects of fear and anxiety.

Ulmer coaches athletes in various sports disciplines and runs popular mindset-only ski camps in Alta, Utah and Powder Mountain that people call life changing. She also works as a zen therapist.

In 2017, Harper Collins published her book, The Art of Fear: Why Conquering Fear Won't Work and What to Do Instead, in which she discusses fear and offers an approach to resolving anxiety. In the book, she argues that traditional approaches to overcoming fear, such as pushing through it, are often ineffective. Instead, Ulmer advocates for accepting and becoming intimate with it as a natural emotional response and offers strategies for individuals to reshape their relationship with fear.

Ulmer's work has been featured by media including NPR, The Wall Street Journal, Forbes, USA Today, The Robb Report, and The Megyn Kelly Show.

== Personal life ==
Ulmer attends the Burning Man festival in Nevada each year and built the Praying Mantis and Scorpion art cars with her ex-husband. The fire-breathing Praying Mantis can now be seen at the Container Park in Downtown Las Vegas.
