= Durrance Route =

Climbing route, Devils Tower, Wyoming, USA

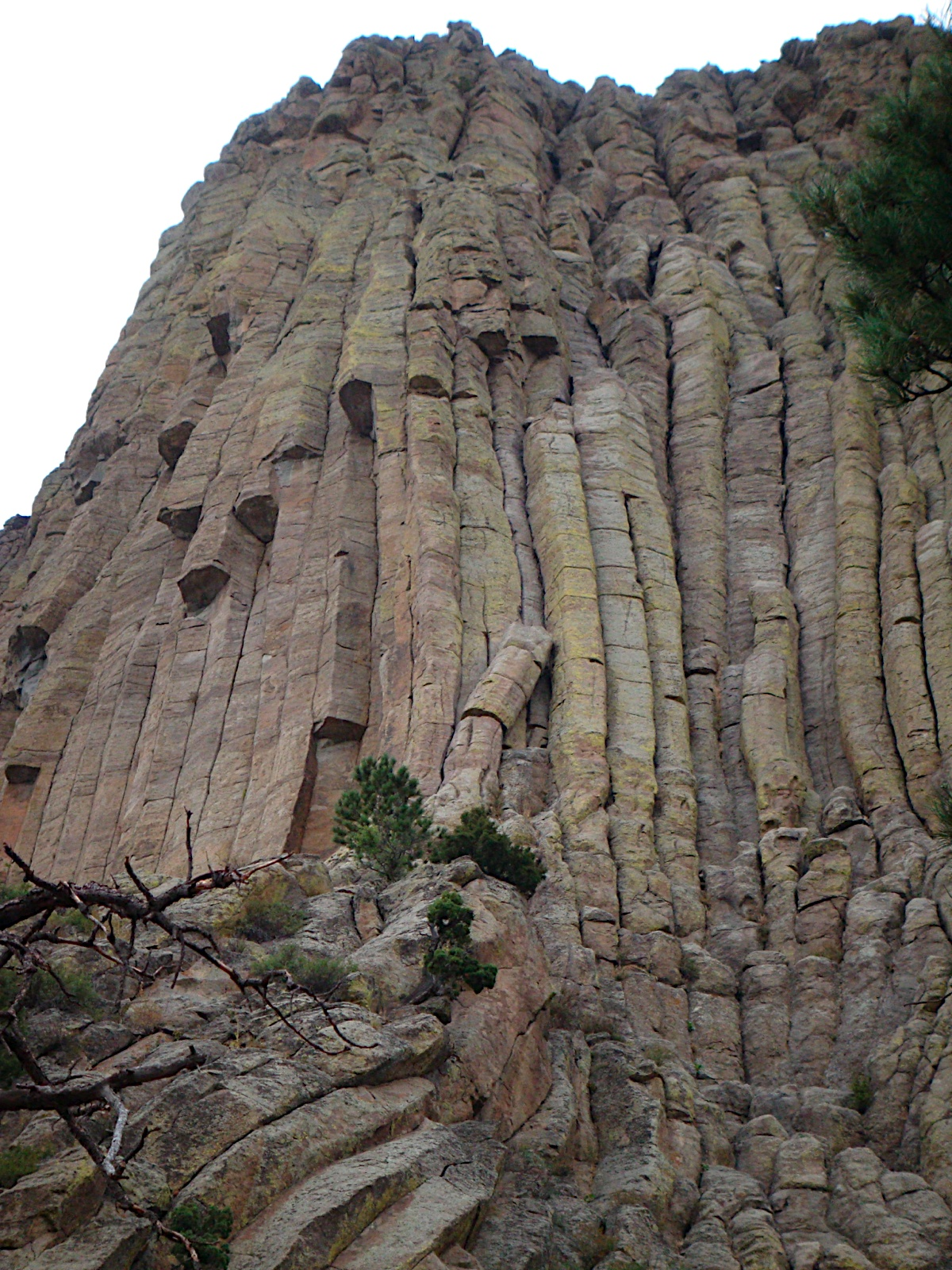
- The Durrance Route begins to the right of the two trees and continues along the inset dihedral.
- Location: Wyoming, United States
- Climbing area: Devils Tower, Durrance Approach
- Route type: Traditional climb
- Vertical gain: 500 feet (150 m)
- Pitches: 6
- Technical grade: 5.7 (5a) (almost certainly sandbagged)
- NCCS grade: III
- First ascent: Jack Durrance and Harrison Butterworth (1938)

The Durrance Route is a climbing route on Devils Tower in Wyoming, United States. First pioneered by Jack Durrance and Harrison Butterworth in September 1938, it was the second free ascent of Devils Tower, following the first ascent led by Fritz Wiessner in 1937. The Wiessner Route lies a few hundred feet to the right of the Durrance Route and has a comparable difficulty. Today the Durrance Route is the most popular route on Devils Tower. It is considered a more interesting and enjoyable route than the Wiessner Route, due to more variable terrain and better belay stances. The route is recognized in the historic 1979 climbing text, Fifty Classic Climbs of North America, and other guide books.

== Route description ==
The route begins below and to the right of the two trees in the reference image. It then ascends the left side of the leaning pillar and continues up the most inset dihedral. The second pitch involves jamming and stemming up the Durance Crack, followed by another pitch along the Cussing Crack. It then ascends a flake, followed by a chimney to a chockstone.

The final pitch has two variations: Bailey's Direct, a direct vertical finish; and the Jump Traverse, which involves leaping an exposed gap to the right, then following the easy Meadows Trail to the summit.

It involves some difficult techniques, including off-width, and despite its easy grade is not well-suited for beginners.

== Significant features ==
=== Leaning column ===
An 8-metre (26 ft) volcanic column has been slightly tipped from vertical. Reports that it was too unstable prompted a United States Geological Survey inspection in 2006. The inspection found that although the pillar did move under a climber's weight, it was unlikely that it would dislodge the pillar. It recommended further monitoring of the situation.

== Notable ascents ==
In 2017, Robert Kelman became the oldest person to climb Devils Tower, aged 86. He ascended through the Durrance Route, (direct finish).
