= Abruzzi Ridge (Mount Saint Elias) =

Mount Saint Elias, Canada

The Abruzzi Ridge is a mountaineering route on Mount Saint Elias, ascending the north (Yukon) side of the mountain. It was first climbed by Luigi Amedeo, Duke of the Abruzzi in 1897, and named in his honor. Although listed in the influential guidebook Fifty Classic Climbs of North America, the route is rarely climbed today due to glacial changes and the danger of icefall avalanches from the northeast face.

Coordinates: 60°18′11″N 140°55′32″W / 60.303034146417346°N 140.92568769941894°W / 60.303034146417346; -140.92568769941894
