= Middle Cathedral Rock =

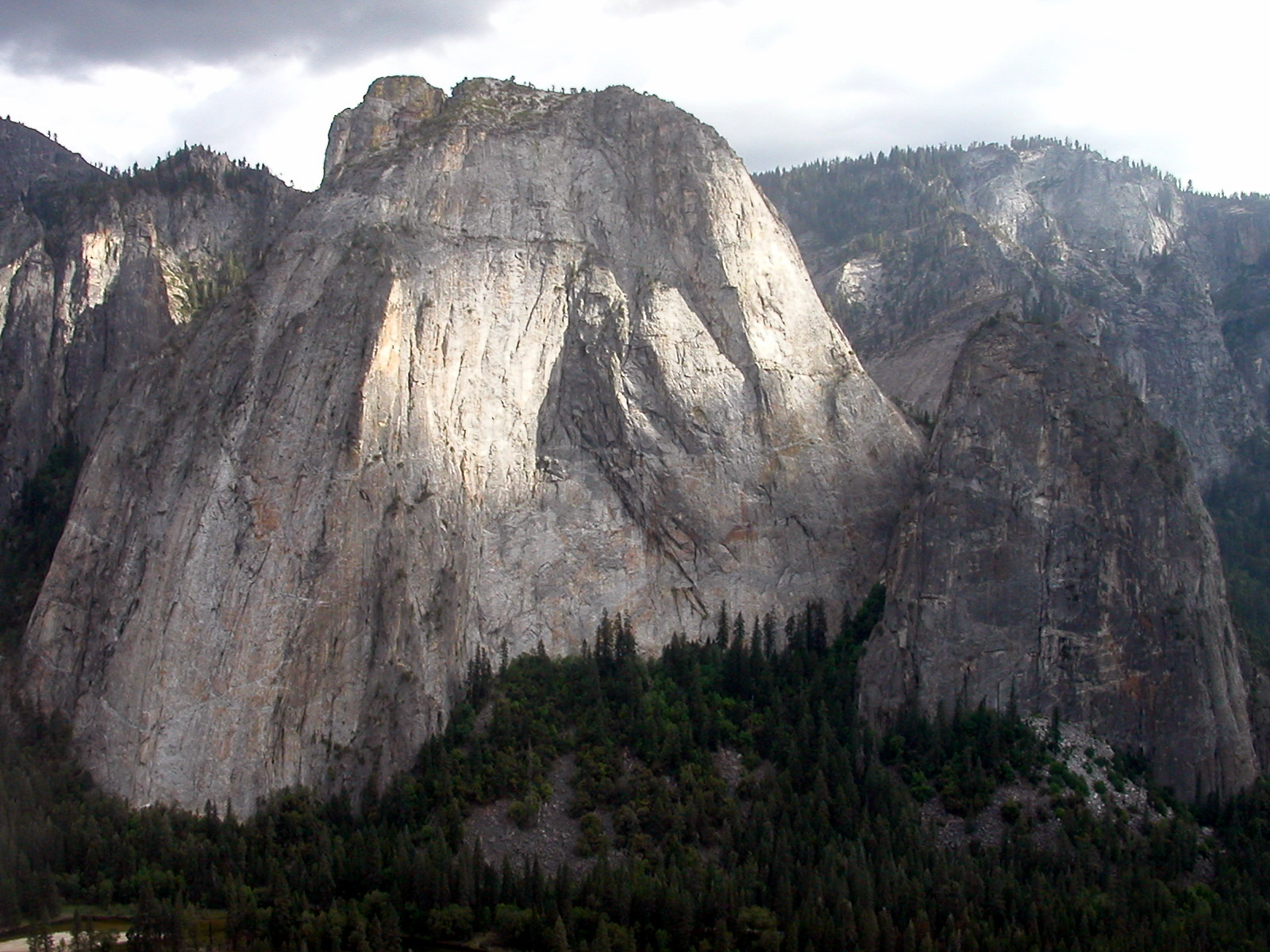
- Middle Cathedral from El Capitan

Highest point
- Elevation: 6,648 ft (2,026 m) NAVD 88
- Coordinates: 37°42′53″N 119°38′13″W

Geography
- Location within California Location within the United States
- Location: Yosemite National Park, Mariposa County, California, U.S.
- Parent range: Sierra Nevada
- Topo map: USGS El Capitan

Geology
- Rock age: Cretaceous
- Mountain type: granite cliff

The Middle Cathedral Rock is a prominent rock face on the south side of Yosemite Valley, California. El Capitan lies due north of Middle Cathedral. Middle Cathedral's East Buttress Route is recognized in the historic climbing text Fifty Classic Climbs of North America.
