= William O. Owen =

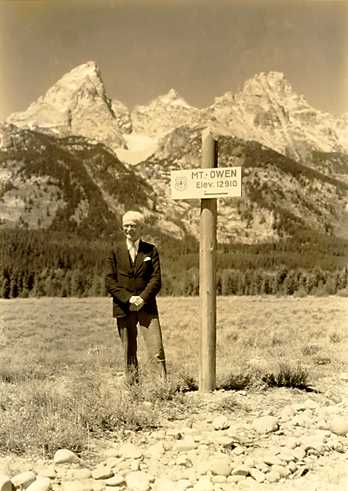
William O. Owen standing next to Mount Owen in Grand Teton National Park, 1933

William Octavius Owen (1859–1947) was a surveyor and civil engineer. On August 11, 1898, William Owen organized the first ascent of Grand Teton, which at 13,775 feet (4,199 m)) is the highest peak in the Teton Range, in the U.S. state of Wyoming. Known by his nickname "Billy" even in adulthood due to his small stature, Owen served as the U.S. Mineral Surveyor for Wyoming and as U.S. Examiner of Surveys for the Department of the Interior until 1914. Owen was also elected as Wyoming State Auditor and served four years (1895–1899).

== First documented ascent of Grand Teton ==
In 1891 and again in 1897, Owen made attempts to reach the summit of Grand Teton, and was nearly killed on the second attempt. In 1898, a party of six sponsored by the Rocky Mountain Club managed to get four climbers to the summit on August 11 of that year. Though Owen was the organizer of the group, Franklin Spencer Spalding was the more experienced climber and was the first man on the summit. Joining Owen and Spalding were local ranchers Frank Petersen and John Shive. Petersen had previously accompanied Owen during their 1897 expedition. One day after their successful ascent, Spalding, Petersen and Shive climbed Grand Teton again to erect a rock cairn at the summit. Though no one disputed the claim by the four climbers that they had indeed reached the summit of Grand Teton, it had long been believed that the first successful ascent had been made more than a quarter–century earlier in 1872 by Nathaniel P. Langford and James Stevenson while serving as members of the Hayden Geological Survey of 1871.

== Controversy regarding the first ascent ==
The ascent of Grand Teton may have been accomplished by Native Americans long before either Owen or Langford. Langford and Stevenson reported finding a small walled structure near the Upper Saddle 455 ft (139 m) below the summit of Grand Teton. They named the structure The Enclosure. Langford and Stevenson are believed to have only climbed to the location of The Enclosure, even though some believe they made the first ascent to the summit. Owen had made several previous attempts on the peak and knew reaching the summit was extremely difficult. Owen published several accounts of this first ascent, discrediting any claim that Langford and Stevenson had ever reached beyond The Enclosure in 1872. While several prominent people sided with Owen's rendition of which party had made the first successful ascent, Franklin Spencer Spalding stated he believed that Langford and Stevenson had been first. The disagreement over which party first reached the top of Grand Teton may be the greatest controversy in the history of American mountaineering. Though no definitive conclusion has ever been reached, Owen's party has been credited with the first undisputed successful ascent. After 1898, no other ascents of Grand Teton were recorded until 1923. He scaled the Grand Teton again in November 1924 to celebrate his 65th birthday and found the records he left at the summit 26 years earlier. In 1927, the second tallest peak in the Teton Range was named Mount Owen in his honor.
