= Lake Charlotte (Florida) =

Lake in the state of Florida, United States

- Location within Florida Location within the United States
- Location: south side of Sebring, Florida
- Coordinates: 27°25′59″N 81°27′03″W
- Type: natural freshwater lake
- Basin countries: United States
- Max. length: 1,955 feet (596 m)
- Max. width: 1,815 feet (553 m)
- Surface area: 201.69 acres (82 ha)
- Max. depth: 22 feet (6.7 m)
- Surface elevation: 89 feet (27 m)
- Islands: a number of swampy islets along shores

Lake Charlotte, a round lake with a small cove on its northwest side, has a surface area of 201.69-acre (816,200 m^{2}). Lake Charlotte is south of Sebring, Florida, and Sparta Road goes around the lake's northeast to southeast side. On the north and east shores are a scattering of residences. The rest of the lake is surrounded by woods and grassland, much of which is planned for residential development. The city limits of Sebringbordere two-thirds of this lake.

Lake Charlotte has no public access on its shores. However, the Take Me Fishing website says the lake contains largemouth bass and bluegill.
