= Grand Teton =

Mountain in United States of America

- Grand Teton from the southwest

Highest point
- Elevation: 13,775 ft (4,199 m) NAVD 88
- Prominence: 6,530 ft (1,990 m)
- Parent peak: Gannett Peak
- Listing: North America highest peaks 78th; US highest major peaks 60th; US most prominent peaks 46th; US most isolated peaks 95th
- Coordinates: 43°44′28″N 110°48′09″W

Geography
- Location within Wyoming
- Country: United States
- State: Wyoming
- County: Teton
- Protected area: Grand Teton National Park
- Parent range: Teton Range
- Topo map(s): USGS Grand Teton, WY

Climbing
- First ascent: 1872 or 1898. See First ascent
- Easiest route: Climb, class 5.4.

Grand Teton is the highest mountain of the Teton Range in Grand Teton National Park at 13,775 feet (4,199 m) in Northwest Wyoming. Below its north face is Teton Glacier. The mountain is a classic destination in American mountaineering via the Owen-Spalding route (II, 5.4), the North Ridge and North Face.

== Geography ==
Grand Teton, at 13,775 feet (4,199 m), is the highest point of the Teton Range, a subrange of the Rocky Mountains, which extend from northern British Columbia to northern New Mexico. It is the second highest peak in the U.S. state of Wyoming after Gannett Peak, the parent peak. The mountain is entirely within the Snake River drainage basin, which it feeds by several local creeks and glaciers. It is considered part of the Cathedral Group next to Teewinot Mountain and Mount Owen (Wyoming) and Middle Teton. Below its north face is Teton Glacier.

The mountain began its uplift 9 million years ago, during the Miocene. Several periods of glaciation have carved Grand Teton and the other peaks of the range into their current shapes.

=== Climate ===
Climate data for Grand Teton 43.7404 N, 110.8023 W, Elevation: 12,352 ft (3,765 m) (1991–2020 normals)
| Month | Jan | Feb | Mar | Apr | May | Jun | Jul | Aug | Sep | Oct | Nov | Dec | Year |
|---|---|---|---|---|---|---|---|---|---|---|---|---|---|
| Mean daily maximum °F (°C) | 18.5 (−7.5) | 17.7 (−7.9) | 22.4 (−5.3) | 27.3 (−2.6) | 36.8 (2.7) | 47.8 (8.8) | 58.0 (14.4) | 57.1 (13.9) | 48.3 (9.1) | 35.6 (2.0) | 23.9 (−4.5) | 17.9 (−7.8) | 34.3 (1.3) |
| Daily mean °F (°C) | 9.1 (−12.7) | 7.4 (−13.7) | 11.6 (−11.3) | 16.0 (−8.9) | 24.9 (−3.9) | 34.8 (1.6) | 43.7 (6.5) | 43.0 (6.1) | 34.9 (1.6) | 24.0 (−4.4) | 14.5 (−9.7) | 8.7 (−12.9) | 22.7 (−5.1) |
| Mean daily minimum °F (°C) | −0.4 (−18.0) | −2.9 (−19.4) | 0.8 (−17.3) | 4.6 (−15.2) | 13.0 (−10.6) | 21.8 (−5.7) | 29.5 (−1.4) | 28.8 (−1.8) | 21.6 (−5.8) | 12.3 (−10.9) | 5.2 (−14.9) | −0.4 (−18.0) | 11.2 (−11.6) |
| Average precipitation inches (mm) | 9.85 (250) | 7.74 (197) | 7.84 (199) | 7.10 (180) | 6.46 (164) | 4.23 (107) | 1.33 (34) | 1.87 (47) | 3.09 (78) | 4.92 (125) | 7.82 (199) | 9.22 (234) | 71.47 (1,814) |
Source: PRISM Climate Group

== History ==
=== Name ===
Grand Teton's name was first recorded as Mount Hayden by the Washburn-Langford-Doane Expedition of 1870. However, the name "the Grand Teton" had early currency. The edition of April, 1901 of the USGS 1:125,000 quadrangle map of the area shows "Grand Teton" as the name of the peak. A United States National Park named "Grand Teton National Park" was established by law in 1929. By 1931, the name Grand Teton Peak was in such common usage that it was recognized by the USGS Board on Geographic Names. Another shift in usage led the Board to shorten the name on maps to Grand Teton in 1970.

In terms of etymology for the mountain's naming, the most common explanation is that "Grand Teton" means "large teat" or "large breast" (téton) in French, named by either French-Canadian or Iroquois members of an expedition led by Donald McKenzie of the North West Company. Unsubstantiated claims exist that the mountain was named after the Teton Sioux tribe of Native Americans, even though this tribe lived about 200 miles (320 km) away in the Dakotas, not Wyoming. Moreover, in terms of etymology studies, the Teton Sioux tribe's name is stated as being "not related" to the Grand Teton.

== Climbing ==
=== First ascent ===
There is a disagreement over who first climbed Grand Teton. Nathaniel P. Langford and James Stevenson claimed to have reached the summit on July 29, 1872 while serving as members of the Hayden Geological Survey of 1871. A party organised by William O. Owen also claimed the first ascent when they reached the summit of Grand Teton on August 11, 1898.

Some believe that Langford/Stevenson's description and sketches match the summit of The Enclosure, a side peak of Grand Teton (the Enclosure is named after a man-made palisade of rocks on its summit, probably constructed by Native Americans). Langford himself suggested that the Enclosure was probably first climbed by Native Americans. Mountaineer and author Fred Beckey believes that Langford/Stevenson climbed the Enclosure because their description better matches it and does not accurately describe the true summit, nor does it mention the formidable difficulties found just above the Upper Saddle. Beckey also believes that they summited the Enclosure because it was traditional with members of the Hayden Geological Survey of 1871 to build a cairn in such a place, but no such cairn was found when Owen reached the summit of Grand Teton in 1898.

Supporters of Owen's claim included The Wyoming Legislature and Paul Petzoldt, former pioneer American climber. Ironically among Langford's supporters was Franklin Spalding, who led Owen's ascent to the summit and tossed the rope that allowed Owen and the others to follow.

Mountaineer and author Leigh Ortenburger researched the controversy in depth, using original source material, for his 1965 climber's guidebook. Ortenburger concluded: "Since historical 'proof' is extremely unlikely to be forthcoming for either side of the argument, perhaps the best way of regarding the problem, short of a detailed analysis of the probabilities, is to state that in 1872 Langford and Stevenson may have climbed the Grand Teton, in 1893 Kieffer, Newell, and Rhyan may have climbed it, and in 1898 Spalding, Owen, Peterson, and Shive definitely did succeed in reaching the summit."

=== Routes ===
Grand Teton can be climbed via the Owen-Spalding route (II, 5.4). A short section of the route is highly exposed and previous alpine climbing experience is recommended before attempting an ascent; nonetheless, athletes with no prior climbing experience regularly reach the summit. The Owen-Spalding route is named for the climbers who claim to have made the first ascent: William Owen, Franklin Spalding, Frank Peterson, and John Shive. There is some debate as to which group made the first ascent; see that discussion. Notwithstanding the first-ascent controversy, this climbing route has been firmly named after William Owen and Franklin Spalding. The Owen-Spalding route begins at the Lower Saddle which is reached by walking from the Lupine Meadows Trailhead to Garnet Canyon and then up to the Lower Saddle on a trail that's fairly well defined. The more technical & exposed part of the climb begins at the Upper Saddle.

- The most popular route up the mountain is via the Upper Exum Ridge Route (II, 5.5) on the Exum Ridge, an exposed route first climbed by Glenn Exum, co-founder of Exum Mountain Guides. Much of the climbing is fourth class, with one wide step from the end of Wall Street Ledge to the Ridge comprising the first stretch of technical climbing. Other notable pitches include the Golden Stair (immediately following the traverse from Wall Street Ledge), the Friction Pitch (considered the most difficult pitch on the route), and the V-Pitch. The direct start of the Exum Ridge using the Lower Exum Ridge Route (III, 5.7,) is considered a mountaineering classic and is featured in the historic climbing text Fifty Classic Climbs of North America.
- In addition to the Direct Exum Ridge Route, the "Classic Climbs" listing also features the North Ridge (IV, 5.8) and North Face with Direct Finish (IV, 5.8), both of which ascend the dramatic northern aspect of the peak. The Grand Teton has the most routes listed in the Fifty Classic Climbs of North America of any peak. The only other to have more than one route listed is El Capitan, with The Nose and Salathé Wall. These inclusions have helped maintain the fame of the peak in the climbing community. Since the Grand Teton's first ascent, 38 routes with 58 variations have been established.

== Skiing ==
=== First ski and snowboard descents ===
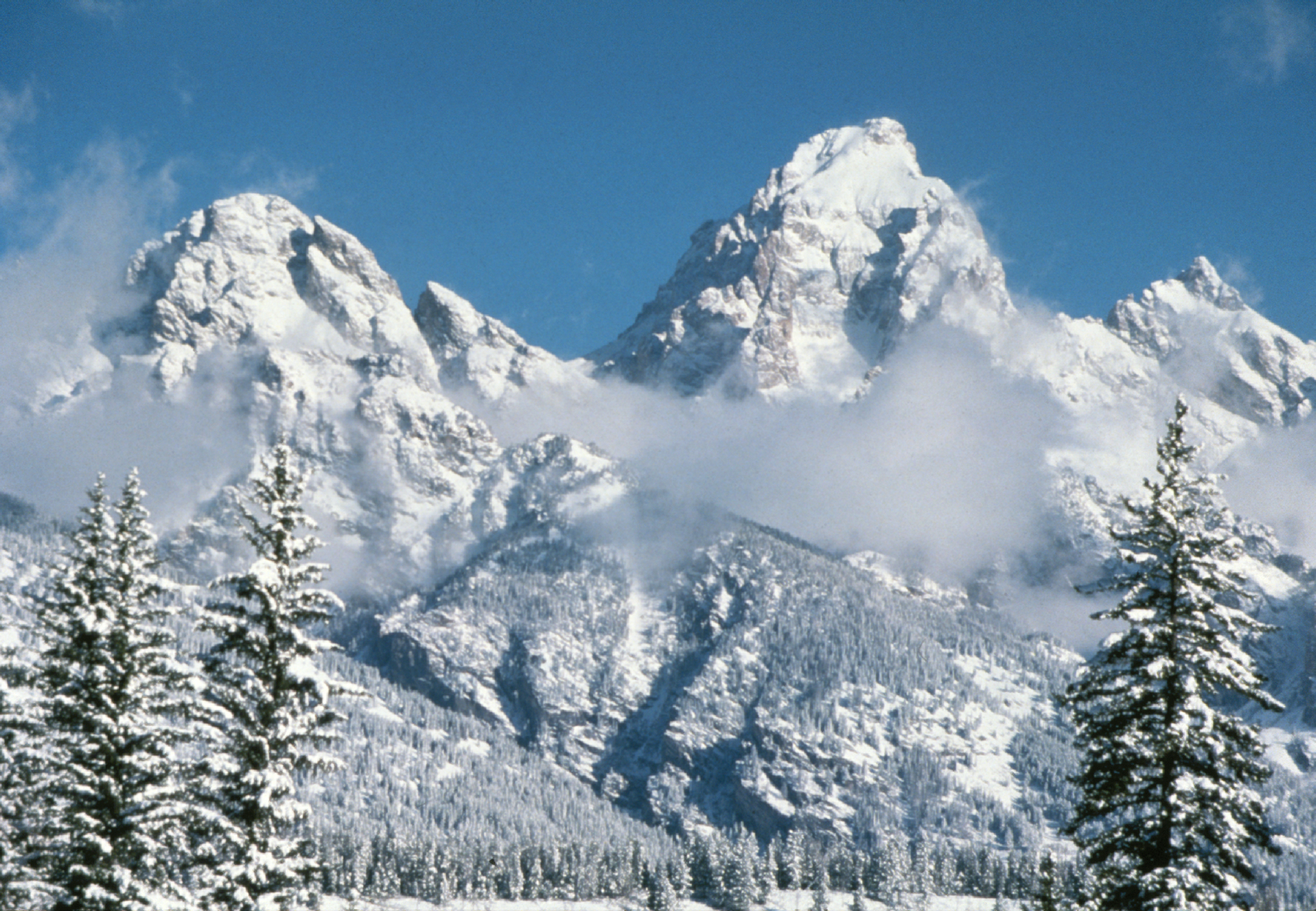
Winter on Grand Teton at center with Mount Owen at right and Nez Perce at left. The Middle and South Teton peaks lie west of Nez Perce, out of view.

- First male alpine descent: Bill Briggs, 1971
- First female alpine descent: Kristen Ulmer, 1997
- First male Telemark descent: Rick Wyatt, 1982
- First female Telemark descent: A.J. Cargill, 2004
- First male snowboard descent: Stephen Koch, 1989
- First female snowboard descent: Dani deRuyter, 2010
- First male disabled ski descent: Santiago Vega, 2021.

=== Routes ===
The Grand Teton has been skied by five routes, each requiring at least one rappel. The first descent on skis was made by Bill Briggs in the spring of 1971 down the East Face and Stettner Couloir, it has since been renamed the Briggs Route. This descent required a free rappel, which was completed with skis on. More casually, skiing is possible from the crest of the saddle between the Grand and the Middle Teton, continuously into the valley floor.

== Running ==
On September 2, 2024, Michelino Sunseri ran up and down Grand Teton in two hours, 50 minutes and 10 seconds, breaking a speed record set by Andy Anderson in 2012. He was found to have used a restricted trail, leading to a misdemeanor conviction for shortcutting a designated trail. He was pardoned by President Donald Trump in November 2025.

== See also ==
- 4000 meter peaks of North America
- Central Rocky Mountains
- Mountain peaks of North America
- Mountain peaks of the Rocky Mountains
- Mountain peaks of the United States
- List of Ultras of North America
- List of Ultras of the United States
- Breast-shaped hill
- Geology of the Grand Teton area
- The Enclosure (Grand Teton monument)
