= Jack Durrance =

American rock climber and mountaineer

- Born: John Randall Durrance; July 20, 1912; Ocala, Florida
- Died: November 7, 2003 (aged 91); Denver, Colorado
- Occupations: Physician, rock climber

John Randall Durrance (July 20, 1912 – November 7, 2003) was a pioneering American rock climber and mountaineer.

== Climbing career ==
Durrance learned to climb while attending high school in Germany and later founded the Dartmouth Mountaineering Club in 1936 while attending Dartmouth College. Some of his classic first ascents include the North Face of the Grand Teton and the "Durrance Route" on Devils Tower. His successful completion of the Grand's Exum Ridge and West Face, along with his contributions to the development of bouldering, stand among his other climbing achievements.

On the 1939 American Karakoram expedition to K2 he attempted to climb K2, the second tallest mountain in the world. He became embroiled in controversy after four members of the expedition died and the expedition leader, Fritz Wiessner, blamed Durrance. A book seeking to shed light on the event, K2: The 1939 Tragedy, was published in 1993. The authors, William Putnam, a former president of the Alpine Club, and Andy Kauffman, a former director, relied on a Durrance diary that surfaced for the first time fifty years after the event to correct the controversy and place responsibility for the deaths on Wiessner, the expedition's leader. Ed Viesturs, in his book "K2: Life and Death on the World's Most Dangerous Mountain", revisits all the available documentation and suggests instead that the unplanned decision to decommission all lower camps played a major role in the tragedy. Durrance, despite the claims being laid on him by Weissner, had hesitated to release his diary any earlier due to the amount of damage the controversy could do to people's reputations if it were stirred up again.

== Personal life ==
During the 1939 climb, Durrance saved the life of Chap Cranmer who was suffering from pulmonary edema. Mr. Cranmer's family thanked Durrance by getting Durrance an internship with James J. Waring, an international expert on tuberculosis. Durrance took the internship and became a pulmonary physician at a Denver hospital. In addition to climbing and medicine another passion of his was hybridizing irises.

Durrance died on November 7, 2003, aged 91, survived by his widow, Stella Coulter Durrance, and their five children.
