= South Face (Charlotte Dome) =

South Face of Charlotte Dome
- Location: Kings Canyon National Park, California, United States
- Coordinates: 36.78230°N 118.479°W
- Climbing area: Charlotte Dome
- Route type: Trad/Alpine
- Vertical gain: 1,200 feet
- Pitches: 12
- Technical grade: 5.8
- NCCS grade: III
- First ascent: Galen Rowell, Chris Jones, Fred Beckey, 1970.

The South Face of Charlotte Dome is a technical alpine rock climbing route. It is featured in Fifty Classic Climbs of North America. Chris Jones, a member of the first ascent party, wrote that "in Yosemite, the climb would be recognized as one of the best in the Valley. In the backcountry it will probably remain unknown."
