= Charlotte Lake (Todd County, Minnesota) =

Lake in the state of Minnesota, United States

- Location within Minnesota
- Location: Todd County, Minnesota
- Coordinates: 45°57′8″N 94°51′46″W
- Type: Lake
- Surface elevation: 1,296 feet (395 m)

Charlotte Lake is a lake in Todd County, in the U.S. state of Minnesota.

Charlotte Lake was named for Charlotte O. Van Cleve, the wife of an early settler.

== See also ==
- List of lakes in Minnesota
