= South Face (Petit Grepon) =

Multi-pitch climbing route in Colorado

South Face of Petit Grepon
- Location: Rocky Mountain National Park, Colorado, USA
- Coordinates: 40.28030°N 105.6725°W
- Climbing area: Rocky Mountain National Park
- Route type: Trad/Alpine
- Pitches: 9
- Technical grade: 5.8
- NCCS grade: III

The South Face of Petit Grepon is a popular technical climbing route on the Petit Grepon in Colorado's Rocky Mountain National Park. The South Face is recognized in the historic climbing text Fifty Classic Climbs of North America and considered a classic around the world.
