= Teepe Pillar =

Mountain in Wyoming, United States

- Location within Wyoming Location within the United States

Highest point
- Elevation: 12,271 ft (3,740 m)
- Prominence: 186 ft (57 m)
- Coordinates: 43°44′09″N 110°48′03″W

Geography
- Location: Grand Teton National Park, Teton County, Wyoming, U.S.
- Parent range: Teton Range
- Topo map: USGS Grand Teton

Climbing
- First ascent: 1930 by Robert Underhill & Kenneth Henderson
- Easiest route: Technical, class 5.4 to 5.8

Teepe Pillar (12,271 feet (3,740 m)) is located in the Teton Range, Grand Teton National Park, Wyoming, immediately south of Grand Teton. The peak is the seventh highest in the Teton Range. Teepe Pillar is separated from Grand Teton by a col which drops sharply to the east and west. Northeast of and well below the summit, the Teepe Glacier is situated in a cirque. From Jackson Hole, Teepe Pillar is difficult to observe except from the northeast as it is hidden from view by Disappointment Peak.

Best access to the summit is by way of Garnet Canyon to the Lower Saddle, a broad plateau which divides Grand Teton from Middle Teton. The summit is easiest to reach when approached from the west; however, true to its name, the pillar is a steep technical climb from every direction, involving up to 5 pitches at Class 5.4 to reach the summit.
