= Cleft Falls (Teton County, Wyoming) =

- Location within Wyoming
- Location: Grand Teton National Park, United States
- Coordinates: 43.724029°N 110.778070°W
- Type: Cascade
- Total height: 50 feet (15 m)
- Watercourse: Intermittent stream

Cleft Falls is a cascade located in Garnet Canyon, Grand Teton National Park in the U.S. state of Wyoming. The cascade drops approximately 50 feet (15 m) in and is highly intermittent, fed by runoff from snowmelt and the Middle Teton Glacier. The falls can be reached by way of the Garnet Canyon Trail and is approximately 2 miles (3.2 km) by trail east of Spalding Falls, while further downstream is Bannock Falls.
