= Cathedral Group =

Tallest mountains of the Teton Range

Coordinates: 43.7236°N 110.806°W

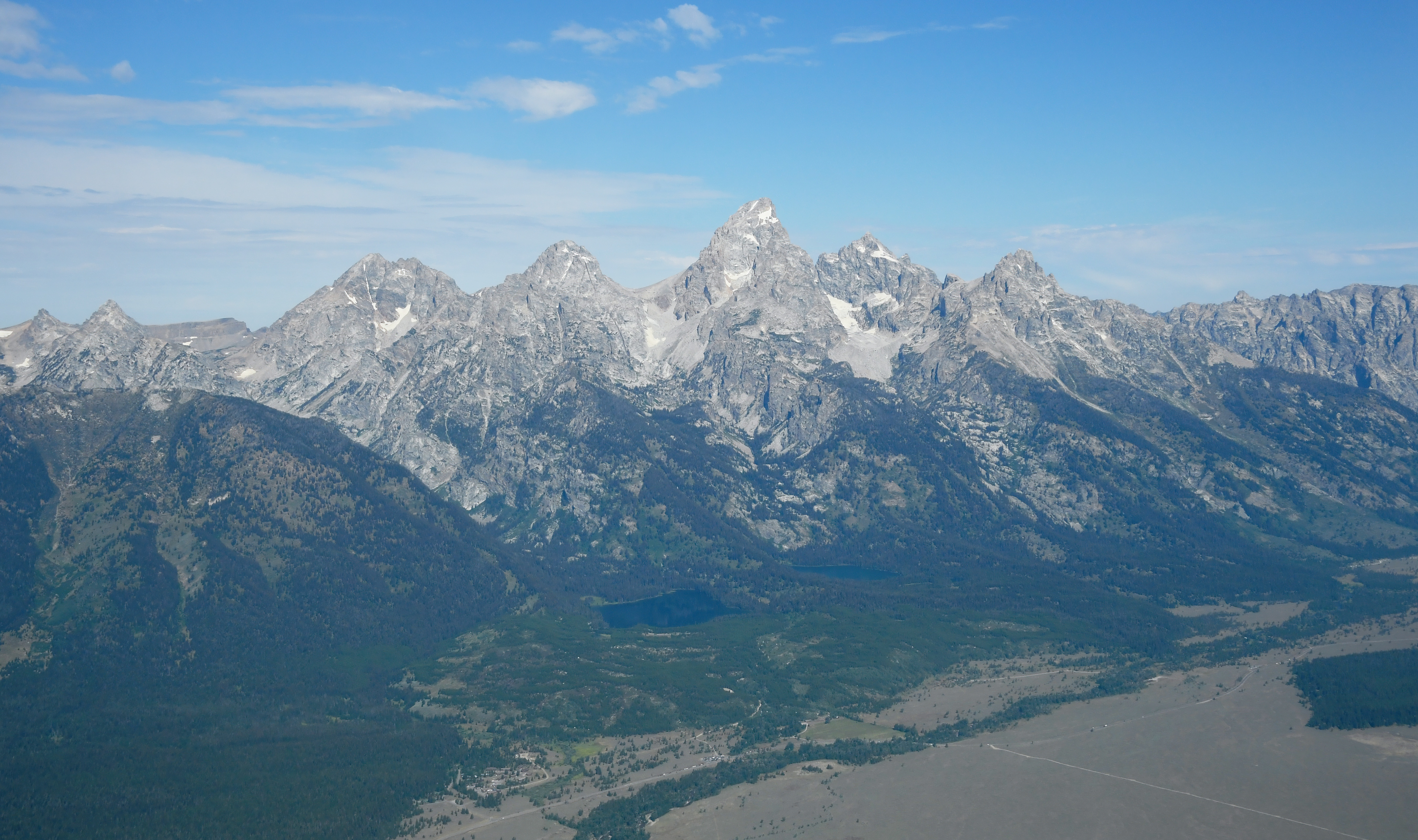
Aerial view of the Cathedral Group of the Teton Range from the southeast with South Teton, Nez Perce Peak, Middle Teton, Grand Teton, Mount Owen, Teewinot Mountain (from left to right; see the image annotations), Taggart Lake (left), and Bradley Lake (right)

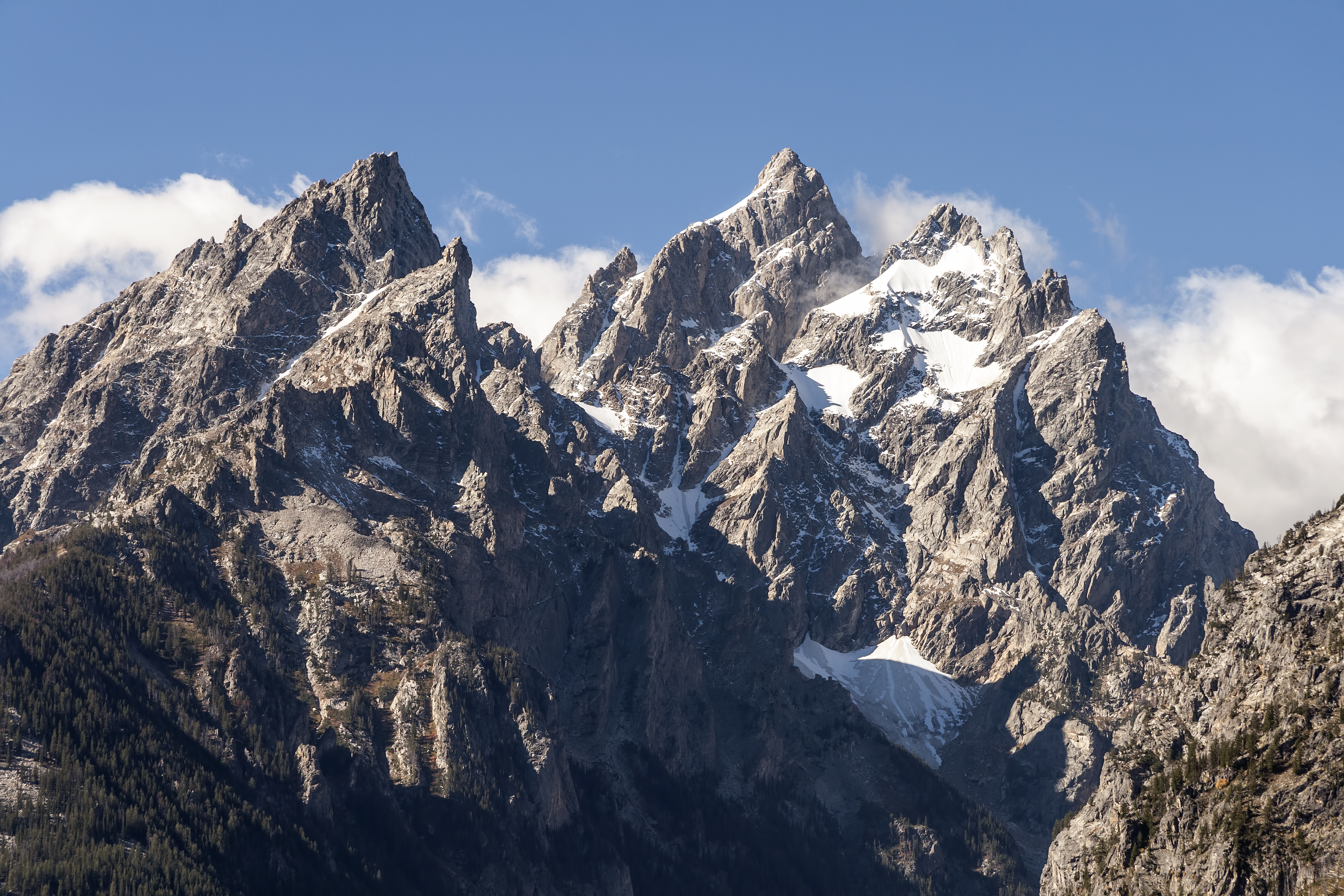
The Cathedral Group of the Teton Range from the northeast with Teewinot Mountain at left, Grand Teton center and Mount Owen at right

The Cathedral Group is the group of the tallest mountains of the Teton Range, all of which are located in Grand Teton National Park in the U.S. state of Wyoming. The Cathedral Group are classic alpine peaks, with pyramidal shapes caused by glacial motion. The highest peak in the group is Grand Teton, which rises more than 7,000 feet (2,100 m) above Jackson Hole valley, and is the second tallest mountain in Wyoming, after Gannett Peak. The Cathedral Group is separated from other tall peaks of the range by the Cascade Canyon to the north and Avalanche Canyon to the south.

Half the remaining dozen glaciers in the Teton Range are located in this cluster of high peaks, including the Teton Glacier which is the largest one in the range. Other glaciers such as the Middle Teton Glacier, Teepe Glacier, and Schoolroom Glacier are also located here. The Cathedral Group has several high cirques, arêtes as well as hanging and U-shaped valleys which are all the work of glacial activity. At the base of the Cathedral Group, several glacial lakes can be found, including Jenny, Bradley and Taggart Lakes, all of which were formed when the glaciers of the last ice age retreated, leaving behind terminal moraines which acted as natural dams. A few high altitude lakes can also be found scattered among the peaks.

== Mountains ==
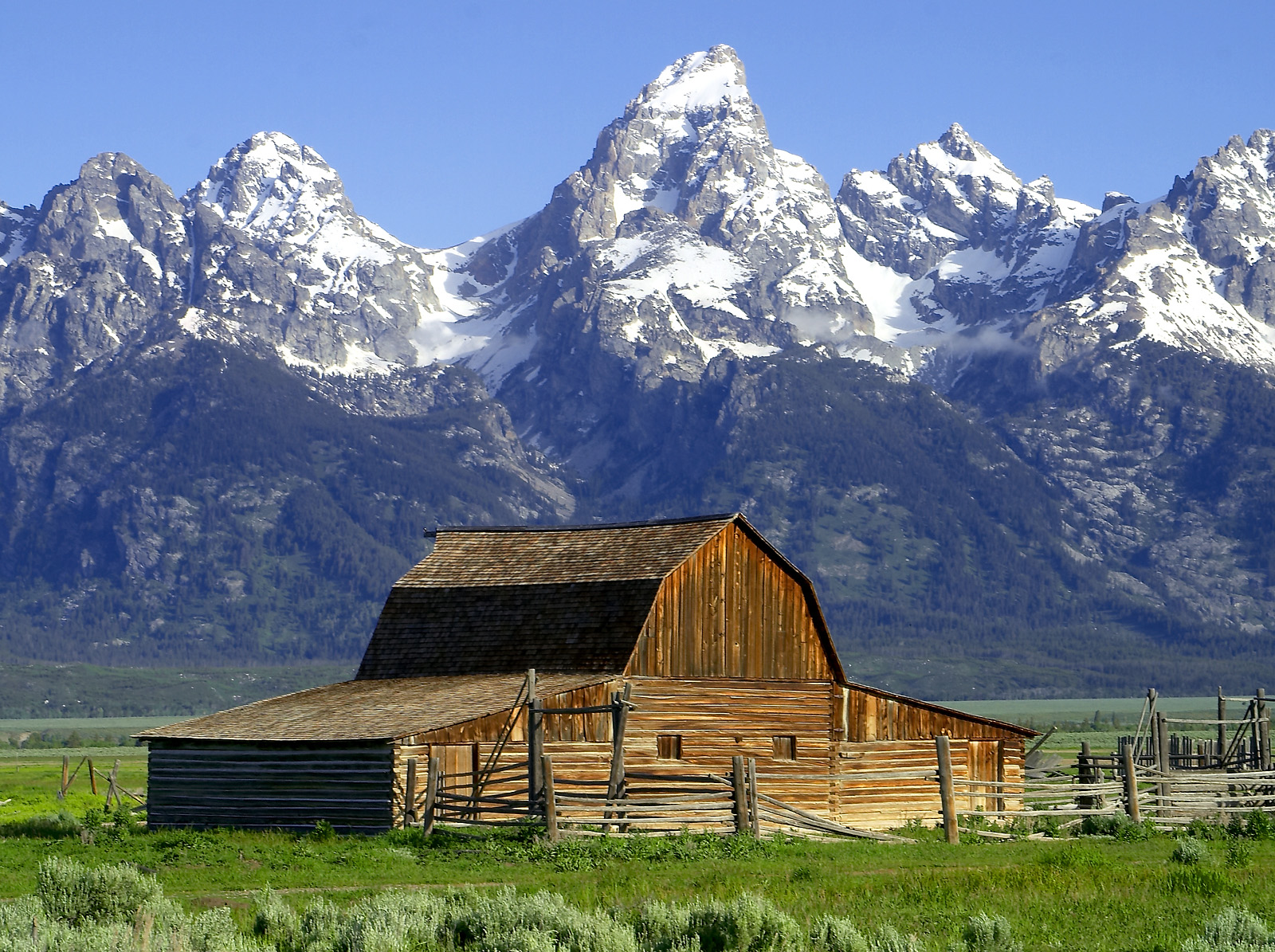
Viewed from Jackson Hole valley looking at the eastern face of the Cathedral Group, including Nez Perce Peak, Middle Teton, Grand Teton, Mount Owen and Teewinot Mountain, left to right.

In addition to Grand Teton, near the northern end of the group, other major peaks found here include Mount Owen, Middle Teton, South Teton, Teewinot Mountain, Teepe Pillar, Cloudveil Dome, Nez Perce Peak and Buck Mountain, most of which are over 12,000 feet (3,700 m) above sea level and represent eight of the ten highest summits in the Teton Range.

Some geographers only include Grand Teton, Mount Owen and Teewinot Mountain as part of the Cathedral Group proper. Similarity of shape and isolation from other high peaks of the range by the deep Cascade and Death Canyons convince others to place all the major peaks between the canyons within the group.
