= Nez Perce Peak =

Mountain in Wyoming, United States

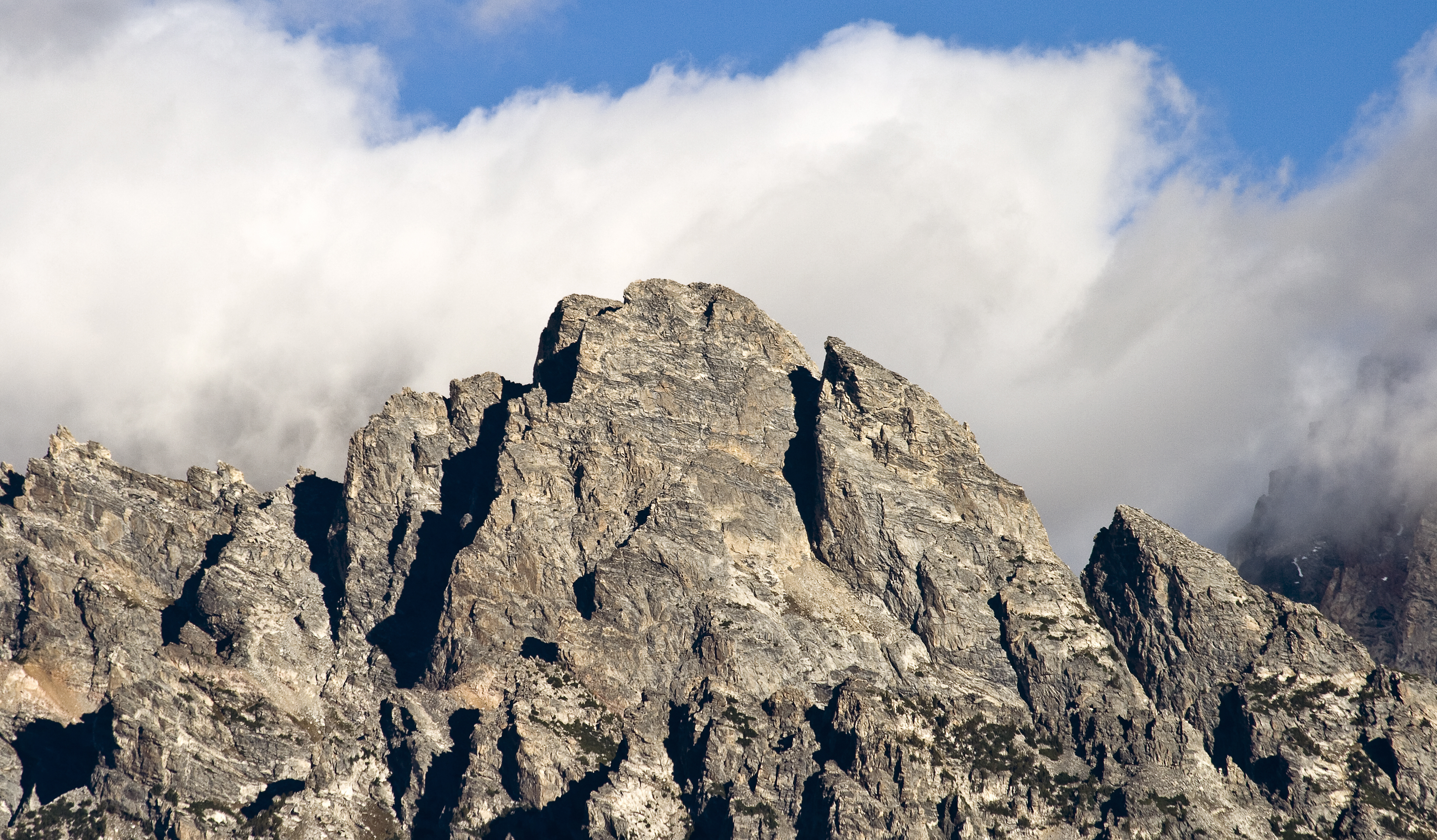
- The summit of Nez Perce Peak from the southeast

Highest point
- Elevation: 11,906 ft (3,629 m)
- Prominence: 461 ft (141 m)
- Coordinates: 43°43′10″N 110°47′48″W

Geography
- Location within Wyoming Location within the United States
- Location: Grand Teton National Park, Teton County, Wyoming, U.S.
- Parent range: Teton Range
- Topo map: USGS Grand Teton

Climbing
- First ascent: Fryxell/Smith 1929
- Easiest route: Scramble

Nez Perce Peak (11,906 ft (3,629 m)) is located in the Teton Range, Grand Teton National Park, Wyoming, immediately southeast of Grand Teton. The peak is in the central portions of the range, immediately east of Cloudveil Dome and is sometimes considered to be part of what is collectively known as the Cathedral Group. Nez Perce rises to the south of Garnet Canyon and is a dramatic peak that dominates the skyline to the west of Bradley and Taggart Lakes. When viewed from the eastern section of Jackson Hole, Nez Perce often obscures the view of Cloudveil Dome as well as South Teton, even though both summits are higher.
