= Bannock Falls (Teton County, Wyoming) =

- Location within Wyoming
- Location: Grand Teton National Park, United States
- Coordinates: 43.720071°N 110.767316°W
- Type: Cascade
- Total height: 200 feet (61 m)
- Watercourse: Garnet Creek

Bannock Falls is a cascade located at the entrance to Garnet Canyon, Grand Teton National Park in the U.S. state of Wyoming. The cascade drops over 200 feet (61 m) and is intermittent, fed by runoff from snowmelt and the Middle Teton Glacier. The falls can be reached by way of the Garnet Canyon Trail and is approximately 2 miles (3.2 km) by trail south of Lupine Meadows. The falls can easily be seen from the Bradley Lake Trail.
