= Disappointment Peak (Wyoming) =

Mountain in the U.S. state of Wyoming

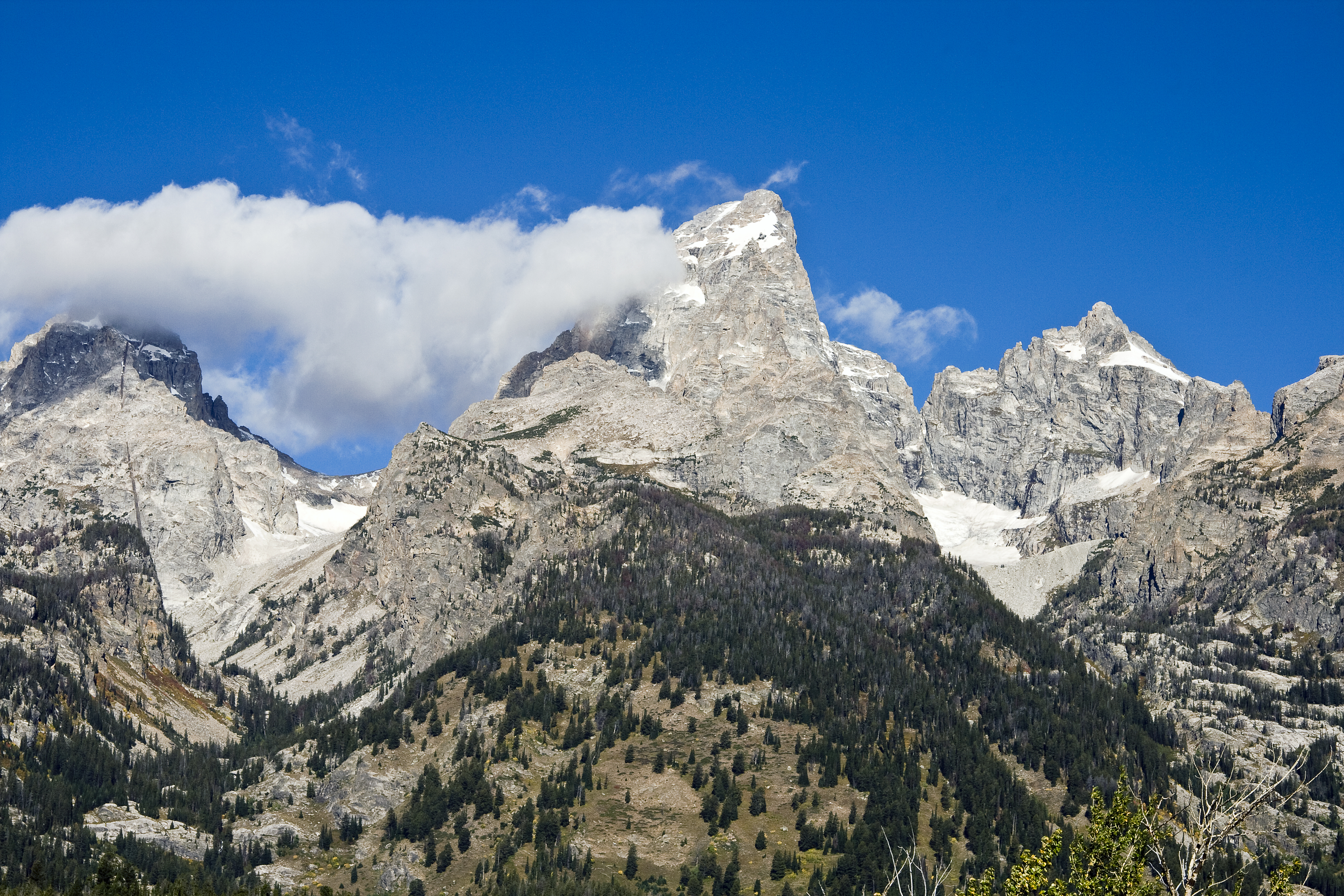
- Forested just below its summit, Disappointment Peak lies below Grand Teton and partially obscures Garnet Canyon in this image

Highest point
- Elevation: 11,623 ft (3,543 m)
- Prominence: 418 ft (127 m)
- Coordinates: 43°44′01″N 110°47′35″W

Geography
- Location within Wyoming Location within the United States
- Location: Grand Teton National Park, Teton County, Wyoming, U.S.
- Parent range: Teton Range
- Topo map: USGS Grand Teton

Climbing
- First ascent: Phil Smith and others 1925
- Easiest route: Technical class 4 to 5.12c

Disappointment Peak (11,623 feet (3,543 m)) is in the Teton Range of Wyoming, in Grand Teton National Park and immediately southeast of Grand Teton. The peak is part of the Cathedral Group, a region of the Tetons noted for particularly rugged mountains. Disappointment Peak rises to the north of Garnet Canyon and to the west of Amphitheater and Surprise lakes. The peak has a variety of mountaineering routes, including the most difficult in the range.

Disappointment Peak was given its name in 1925 when four Colorado climbers, led by Phil Smith (who was soon to become the first park ranger), set out to climb the Grand, but found an impasse on this peak where a 450 foot (140 m) drop is encountered to the saddle between the two summits. After a failed rappel attempt, they gave the peak this name. They were later satisfied to learn they had made a first ascent.
