= Buck Mountain (Wyoming) =

Mountain in Wyoming, United States

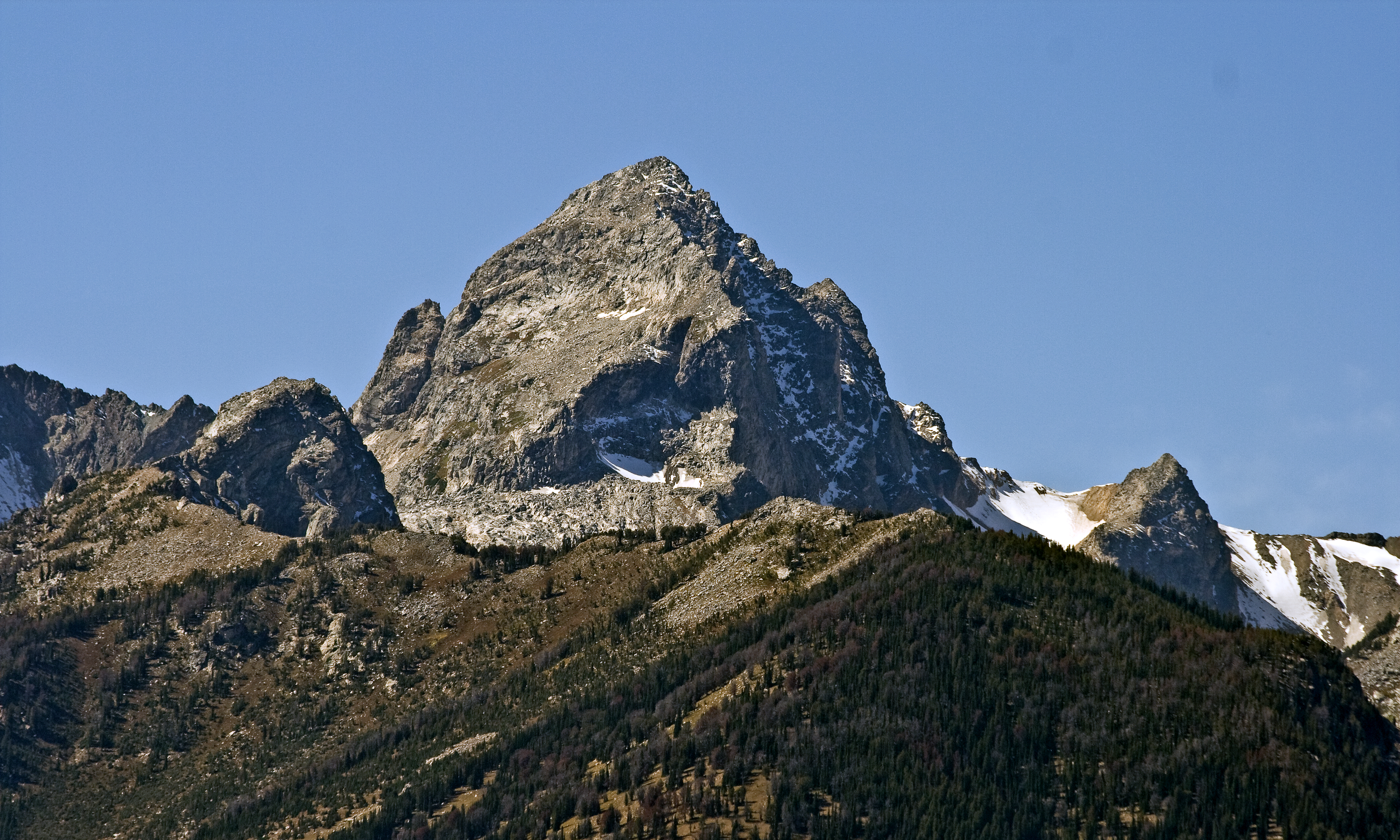
- Buck Mountain from Teton Point turnout

Highest point
- Elevation: 11,943 ft (3,640 m)
- Prominence: 1,298 ft (396 m)
- Coordinates: 43°41′22″N 110°49′10″W

Geography
- Location within Wyoming Location within the United States
- Location: Grand Teton National Park, Teton County, Wyoming, U.S.
- Parent range: Teton Range
- Topo map: USGS Grand Teton

Climbing
- First ascent: Bannon/Buck (August 21, 1898)
- Easiest route: Scramble/Technical class 3 to 5.8

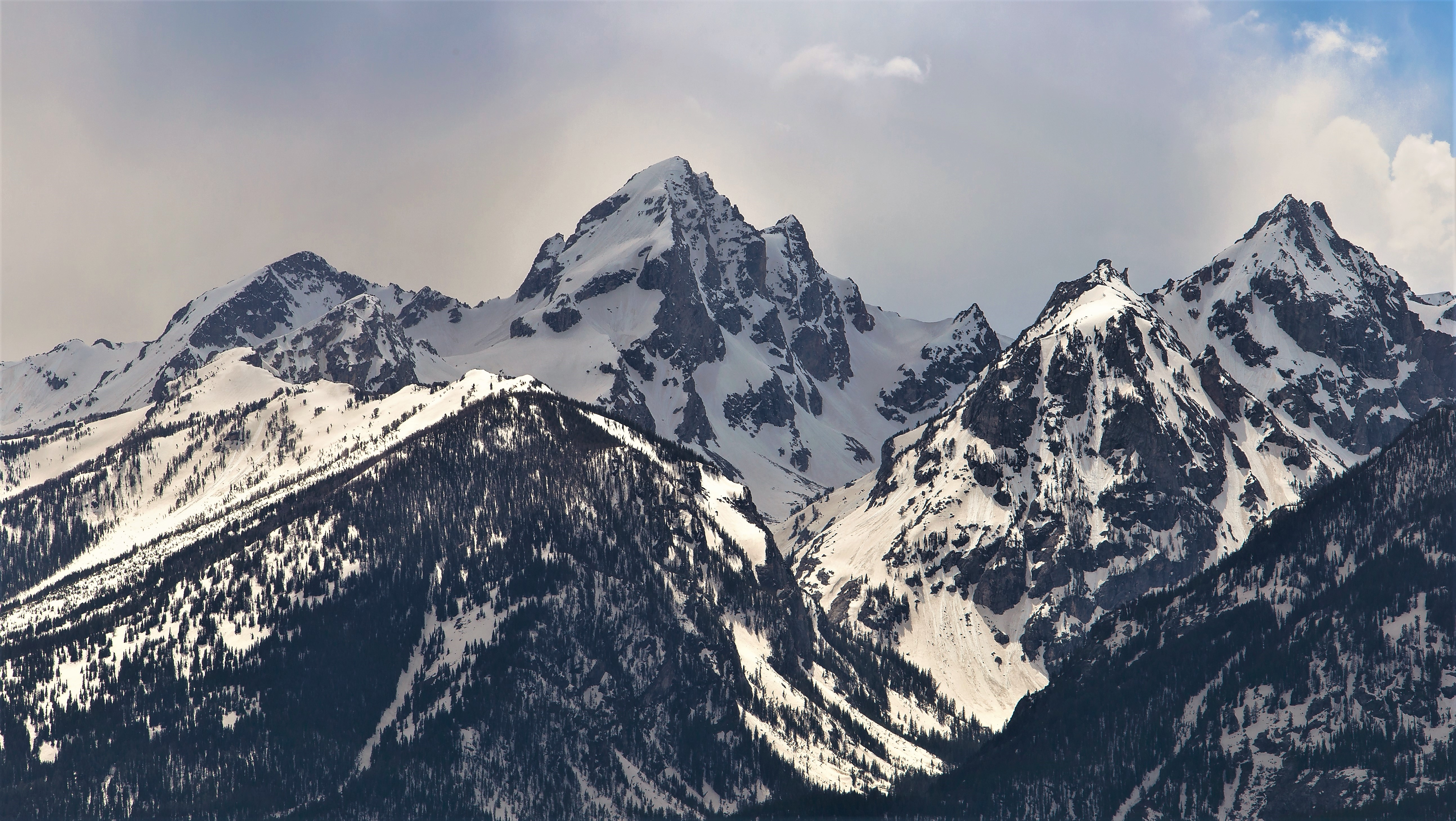
Static Peak, Buck Mountain (center), Mount Wister.

Buck Mountain (elevation: 11,943 feet (3,640 m)) is a mountain located in the Teton Range, Grand Teton National Park, Wyoming, immediately southeast of Grand Teton.

== Description ==
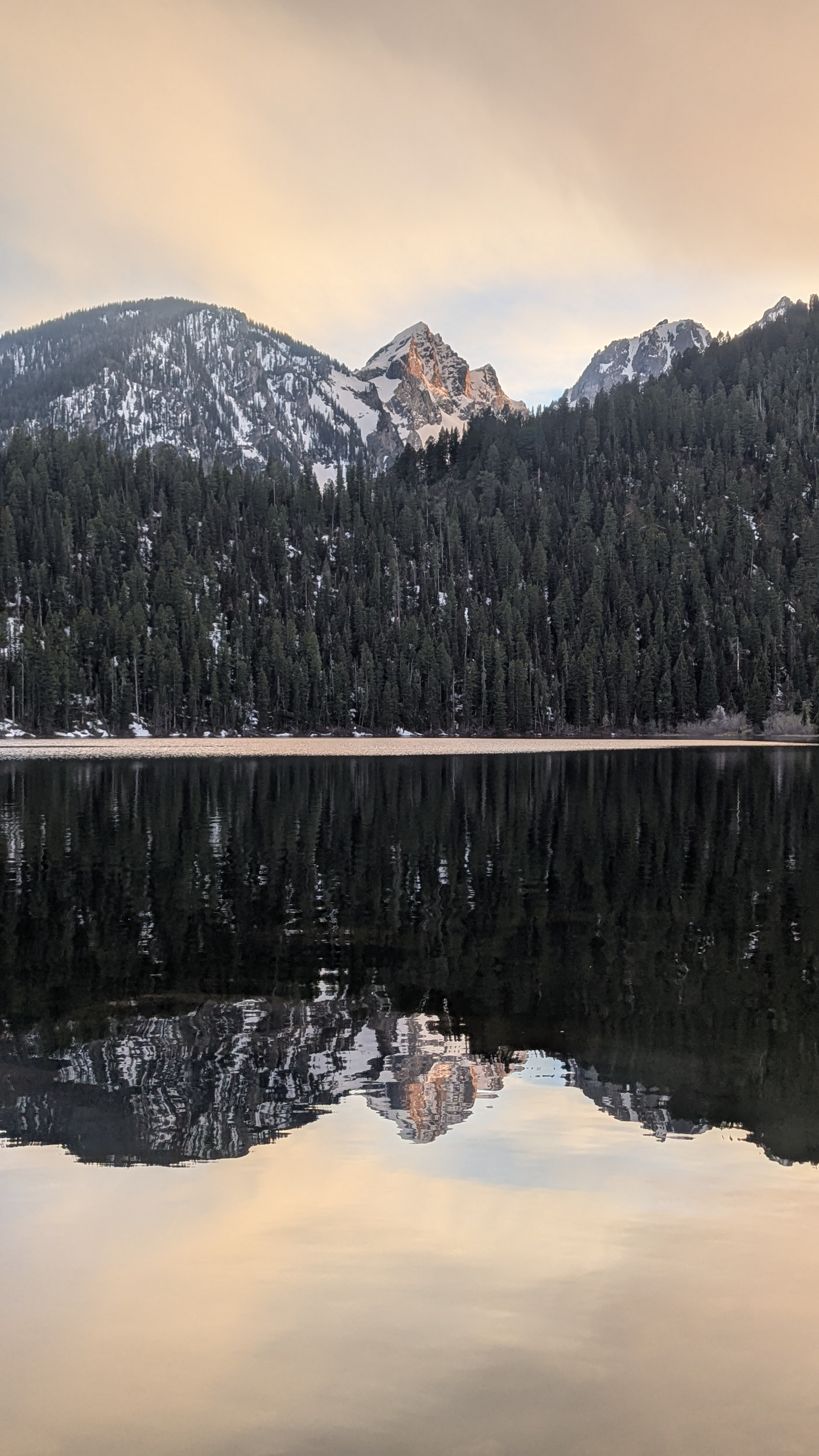
Buck Mountain's north face aglow at sunrise, as observed from Bradley Lake. It was once suggested that Buck Mountain be named "Alpenglow", owing to this effect.

The mountain is the highest summit south of Garnet Canyon and is easily seen from most vantage points in Jackson Hole. Views from the summit offer excellent views of the Cathedral Group to the north. The west slopes of the summit tower are along the Alaska Basin Trail and extend into Caribou-Targhee National Forest and the Jedediah Smith Wilderness, which is the location of Alaska Basin, a popular wilderness camping area for backpackers. Timberline Lake is located on the eastern flanks of the peak.

== History ==
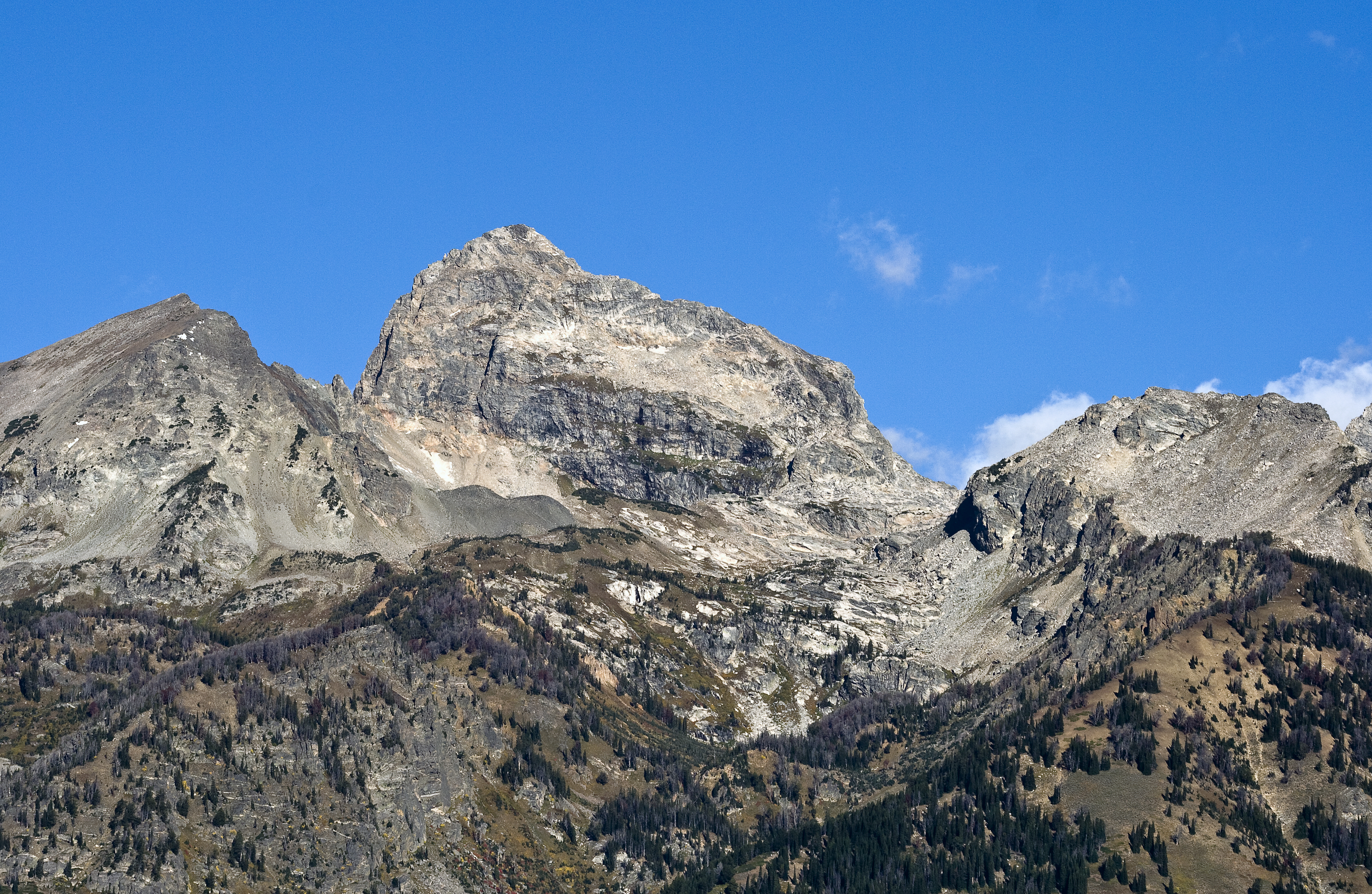
Buck Mountain from south-east, on its left Static Peak, on the right Peak 10696

The first documented summiting by people of European descent was on August 21, 1898, by T.M. Bannon and George Buck, only ten days after Grand Teton was first climbed by another party. Bannon later became the first person to climb Borah Peak, the tallest mountain in the state of Idaho.
