= Cloudveil Dome =

Mountain in Wyoming, United States

- Location within Wyoming Location within the United States

Highest point
- Elevation: 12,031 ft (3,667 m) NGVD 29
- Prominence: 106 ft (32 m)
- Coordinates: 43°43′08″N 110°48′28″W

Geography
- Location: Grand Teton National Park, Teton County, Wyoming, U.S.
- Parent range: Teton Range
- Topo map: USGS Grand Teton

Climbing
- Easiest route: Scramble

Cloudveil Dome (12,031 feet (3,667 m)) is located in the Teton Range, Grand Teton National Park, Wyoming, immediately southeast of Grand Teton. The peak is in the central portions of the range, immediately east of South Teton and is sometimes considered to be part of what is collectively known as the Cathedral Group. Cloudveil Dome rises to the south of Garnet Canyon. The peak has a variety of mountaineering routes that are often overlooked since more popular climbing zones are nearby.
