= Teepe Glacier =

Glacier in Wyoming, United States

- Location within Wyoming
- Type: Mountain glacier
- Location: Grand Teton National Park, Teton County, Wyoming, USA
- Coordinates: 43°44′09″N 110°47′53″W
- Area: 5.4 acres (2.2 ha)
- Length: .20 mi (0.32 km)
- Terminus: Moraine
- Status: Retreating

Teepe Glacier is below the northeast face of Teepe Pillar in Grand Teton National Park, Wyoming, United States. The glacier is immediately southeast of Grand Teton in the heart of the Cathedral Group collection of high peaks in the Teton Range. Between 1967 and 2006, Teepe Glacier lost approximately 60 percent of its surface area, shrinking from 13 to 5 acres (5.3 to 2.0 ha).

== See also ==
- List of glaciers in the United States
