= Spalding Falls (Teton County, Wyoming) =

- Location within Wyoming
- Location: Grand Teton National Park, Teton County, Wyoming, United States
- Coordinates: 43.728542°N 110.796880°W
- Type: Cascade
- Elevation: 10,003 feet (3,049 m)
- Total height: 100 feet (30 m)
- Watercourse: Intermittent stream

Spalding Falls is a cascade located in Garnet Canyon, Grand Teton National Park in the U.S. state of Wyoming. The cascade drops approximately 100 feet (30 m) and is highly intermittent, fed by runoff from snowmelt and the Middle Teton Glacier. The falls can be reached by way of the Garnet Canyon Trail and are approximately 2 miles (3.2 km) further by trail than Cleft Falls.
