= Broken Falls =

- Interactive map of Broken Falls
- Location: Grand Teton National Park
- Coordinates: 43.744655°N 110.754935°W
- Type: Tiered
- Total height: 300 ft (91 m)
- Number of drops: 7
- Longest drop: 72 ft (22 m)

Broken Falls is a waterfall in Grand Teton National Park in the U.S. state of Wyoming. The waterfall descends 300 feet (91 m) over seven drops on the eastern flank of Teewinot Mountain in the Teton Range and then flows into Moose Pond near Jenny Lake.
