= Mount Owen (Wyoming) =

Mountain in the state of Wyoming

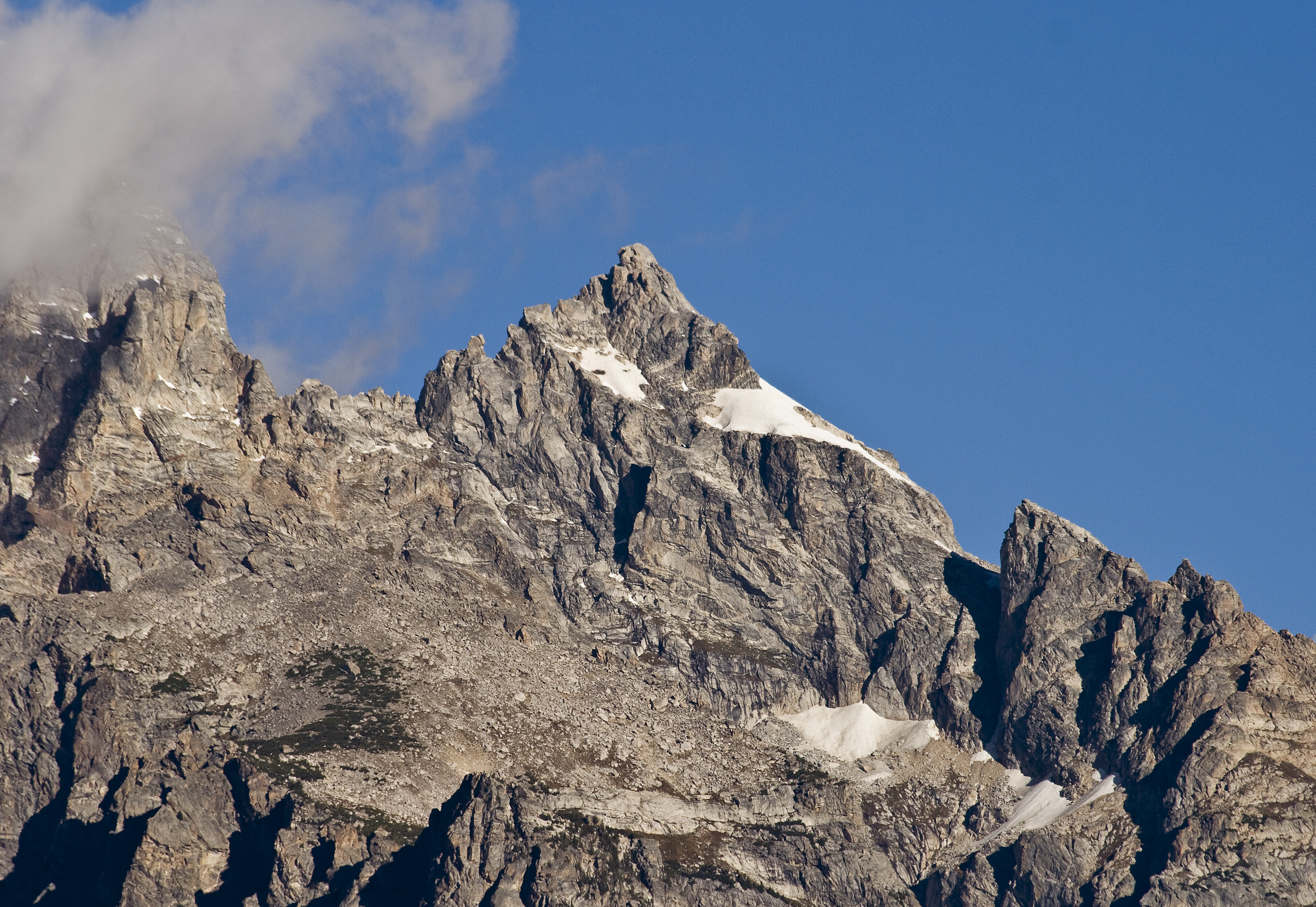
- The summit region of Mount Owen

Highest point
- Elevation: 12,933 ft (3,942 m)
- Prominence: 688 ft (210 m)
- Coordinates: 43°44′49″N 110°47′51″W

Geography
- Location: Grand Teton National Park, Teton County, Wyoming, U.S.
- Parent range: Teton Range
- Topo map: USGS Grand Teton

Climbing
- First ascent: 1930 Fryxell and others
- Easiest route: Scramble class 5.1

Mount Owen (12,933 feet (3,942 m)) is the second highest peak in the Teton Range, Grand Teton National Park in the U.S. state of Wyoming. The peak is named after William O. Owen, who organized the first documented ascent of the Grand Teton in 1898. Mount Owen is part of the Cathedral Group of high Teton peaks, a collection of peaks in the central section of the range that are particularly rugged. The 40-mile (64 km) long Teton Range is the youngest mountain chain in the Rocky Mountains, and began its uplift 9 million years ago, during the Miocene. Several periods of glaciation have carved Mount Owen and the other peaks of the range into their current shapes. Valhalla Canyon is situated on the west slopes of Mount Owen.

== Climbing ==
After two failed attempts in 1927 and one in 1928, Mount Owen was first climbed in 1930, and was one of the last of the major Teton peaks to be climbed. Numerous routes have been explored, ranging in difficulty from Class 5.1 to 5.10.

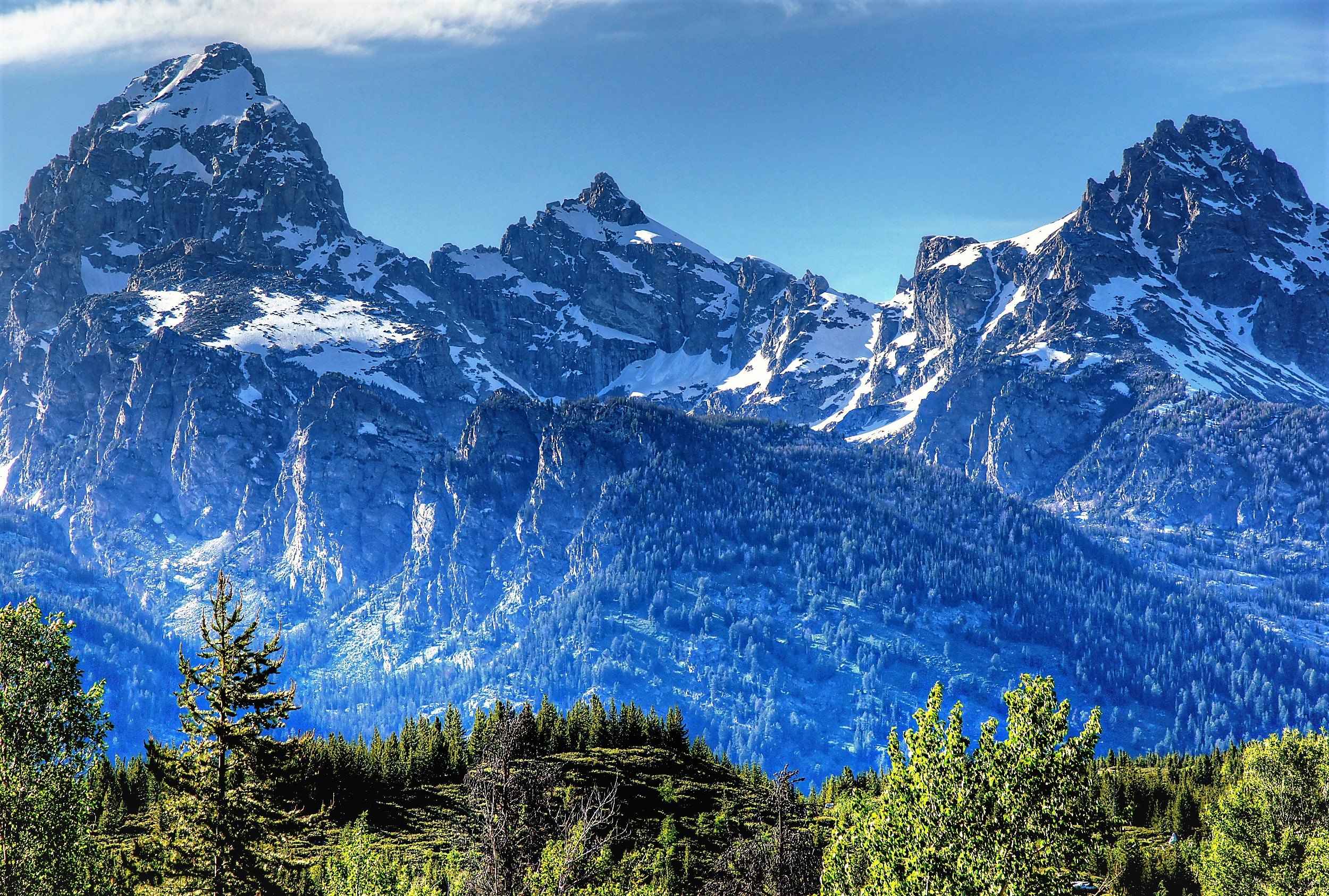
Mt. Owen centered between Grand Teton (left), and Teewinot Mountain (right)

== See also ==
- Geology of the Grand Teton area
