= South Teton =

Mountain in Wyoming, United States

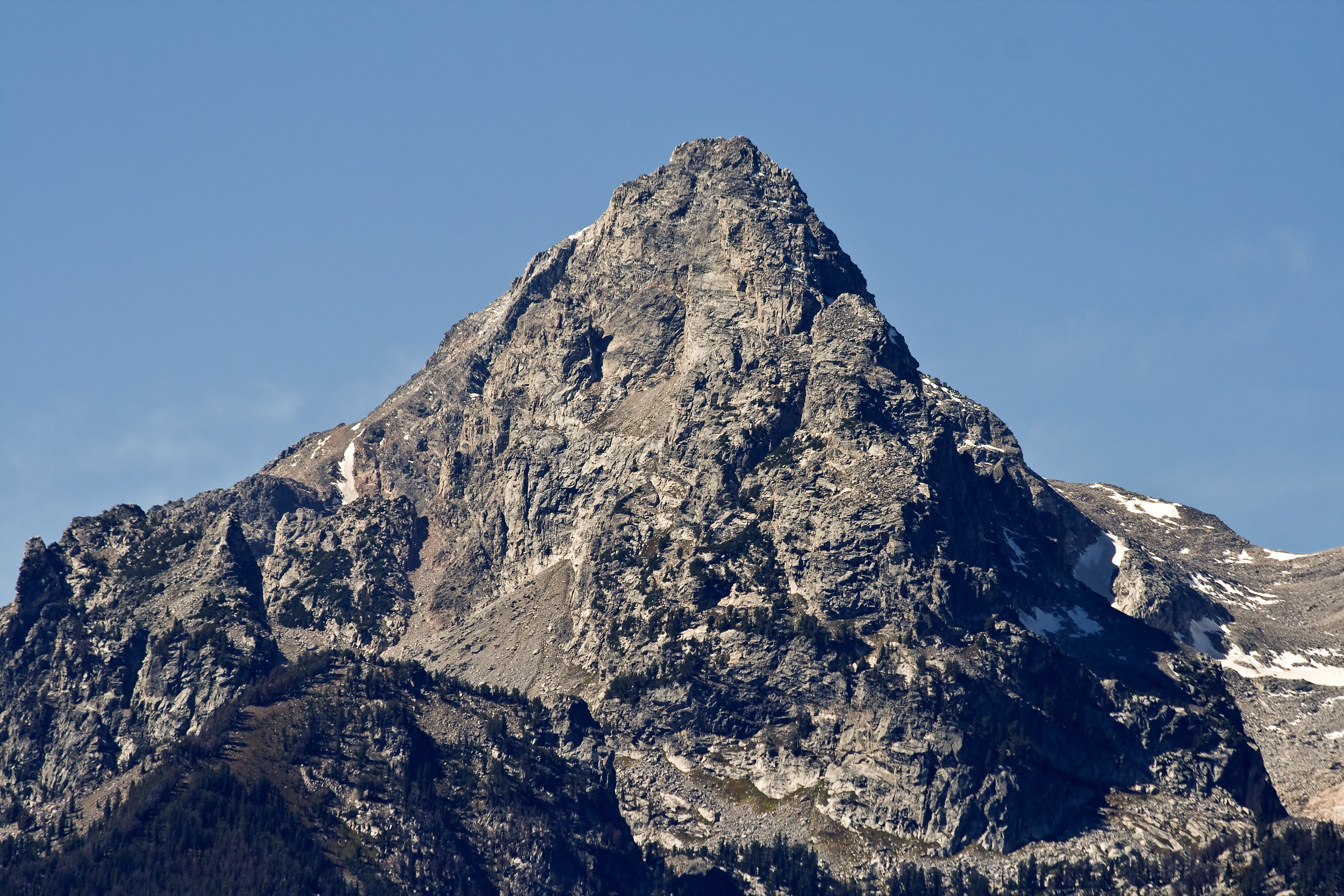
- South Teton

Highest point
- Elevation: 12,519 ft (3,816 m)
- Prominence: 1,074 ft (327 m)
- Coordinates: 43°43′07″N 110°49′07″W

Geography
- Location within Wyoming Location within the United States
- Location: Grand Teton National Park, Teton County, Wyoming, U.S.
- Parent range: Teton Range
- Topo map: USGS South Teton

Climbing
- First ascent: August 29, 1923 (Ellingwood)
- Easiest route: Scramble class 4

South Teton (12,519 feet (3,816 m)) is the fifth-highest peak in the Teton Range, Grand Teton National Park, in the U.S. state of Wyoming. The peak is south of Middle Teton and just west of Cloudveil Dome and is part of the Cathedral Group of high Teton peaks. The 40-mile-long (64 km) Teton Range is the youngest mountain chain in the Rocky Mountains, and began their uplift 9 million years ago, during the Miocene. Several periods of glaciation have carved South Teton and the other peaks of the range into their current shapes.

== Climbing ==
South Teton was first climbed on August 29, 1923, by Albert R. Ellingwood and Eleanor Davis. Ellingwood made the first ascent of Middle Teton the same day. Davis was the first woman to ascend Grand Teton.

The easiest climbing route is via Garnet Canyon to an altitude of 9,200 feet (2,800 m). From there a trail leads southwest towards a pass between South and Middle Teton. Most ascents of the summit are made from this pass. A number of more difficult ascents are also done by experienced climbers, with difficulty of up to Class 5.11.

== Climate ==
Climate data for South Teton 43.7201 N, 110.8171 W, Elevation: 11,667 ft (3,556 m) (1991–2020 normals)
Month	Jan	Feb	Mar	Apr	May	Jun	Jul	Aug	Sep	Oct	Nov	Dec	Year
Mean daily maximum °F (°C)	20.5 (−6.4)	19.8 (−6.8)	24.6 (−4.1)	29.6 (−1.3)	39.2 (4.0)	50.3 (10.2)	60.7 (15.9)	59.8 (15.4)	50.7 (10.4)	37.7 (3.2)	25.9 (−3.4)	19.8 (−6.8)	36.6 (2.5)
Daily mean °F (°C)	11.2 (−11.6)	9.7 (−12.4)	13.9 (−10.1)	18.4 (−7.6)	27.4 (−2.6)	37.4 (3.0)	46.6 (8.1)	45.8 (7.7)	37.5 (3.1)	26.2 (−3.2)	16.7 (−8.5)	10.8 (−11.8)	25.1 (−3.8)
Mean daily minimum °F (°C)	1.9 (−16.7)	−0.5 (−18.1)	3.3 (−15.9)	7.2 (−13.8)	15.6 (−9.1)	24.6 (−4.1)	32.5 (0.3)	31.8 (−0.1)	24.3 (−4.3)	14.8 (−9.6)	7.5 (−13.6)	1.8 (−16.8)	13.7 (−10.1)
Average precipitation inches (mm)	9.76 (248)	7.72 (196)	7.77 (197)	6.96 (177)	6.31 (160)	4.14 (105)	1.37 (35)	1.84 (47)	3.01 (76)	4.81 (122)	7.73 (196)	9.18 (233)	70.6 (1,792)
Source: PRISM Climate Group

== See also ==
- Geology of the Grand Teton area
- Breast-shaped hill
