= Teewinot Mountain =

Mountain in Wyoming, United States

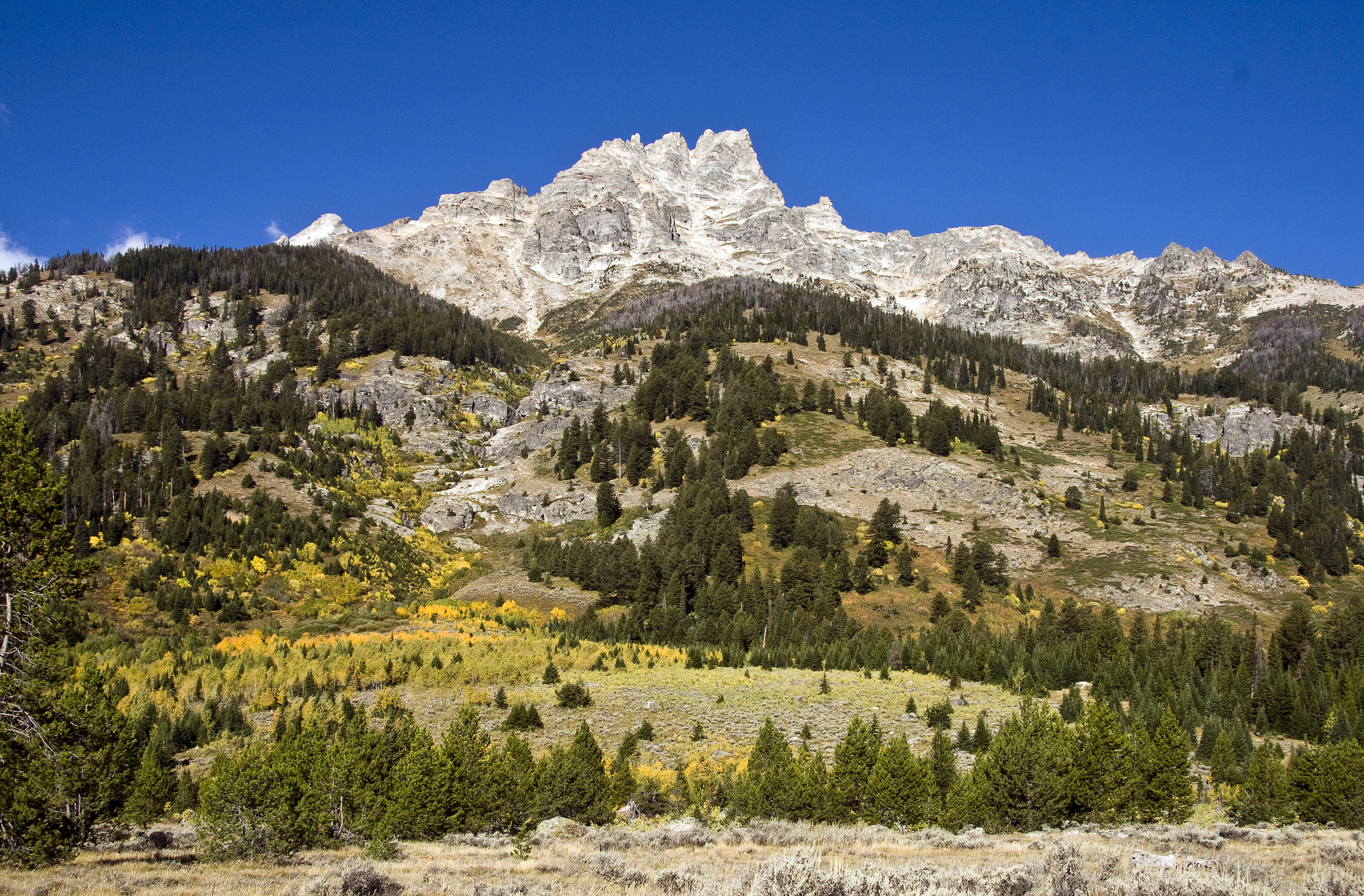
- East face of Teewinot Mountain from Jackson Hole

Highest point
- Elevation: 12,330 ft (3,760 m) NAVD 88
- Prominence: 805 ft (245 m)
- Coordinates: 43°44′50″N 110°46′49″W

Geography
- Location within Wyoming Location within the United States
- Location: Grand Teton National Park, Teton County, Wyoming, U.S.
- Parent range: Teton Range
- Topo map: USGS Grand Teton

Climbing
- First ascent: 1929 (Fryxell)
- Easiest route: Climb, class 4

Teewinot Mountain (12,330 feet (3,758 m)) is the sixth highest peak in the Teton Range, Grand Teton National Park, Wyoming. The name, originally spelled Tee-Win-At, is an Indian word meaning "pinnacles", which is appropriate since the summit is actually a large monolith with several sharp summit spires, the highest of which is quite exposed and big enough for only one or two people. The most common route to the summit is via the ramps and gullies of the East Face, which rises 5,600 ft directly above Lupine Meadows. The 40 miles (64 km) long Teton Range is the youngest mountain chain in the Rocky Mountains, and began their uplift 9 million years ago, during the Miocene. Several periods of glaciation have carved Teewinot Mountain and the other peaks of the range into their current shapes. Broken Falls is one of the tallest cascades in Grand Teton National Park and descends 300 feet (91 m) down the eastern slopes of Teewinot Mountain.

== Climbing ==
Teewinot Mountain is most easily ascended via the eastern face, which finishes with a somewhat exposed Class 4 scramble to the tiny summit. An unmarked climbers' trail, known as the Apex Trail, leads most of the way up the mountain from the Lupine Meadows area.

== See also ==
- Geology of the Grand Teton area
