= Middle Teton =

Mountain in Wyoming, United States

- Middle Teton

Highest point
- Elevation: 12,809 ft (3,904 m)
- Prominence: 1,124 ft (343 m)
- Coordinates: 43°43′48″N 110°48′41″W

Geography
- Location within Wyoming Location within the United States
- Location: Grand Teton National Park, Teton County, Wyoming, U.S.
- Parent range: Teton Range
- Topo map: USGS Middle Teton

Climbing
- First ascent: 29 August 1923 (Ellingwood)
- Easiest route: Scramble/snow/class 3/4

Middle Teton (12,809 feet (3,904 m)) is the third-highest peak in the Teton Range, in the U.S. state of Wyoming. Located within Grand Teton National Park, the peak is immediately southwest of Grand Teton, from which it is separated by a broad high ridge at 11,600 feet (3,540 m), known to local climbers as the Lower Saddle. The Middle Teton Glacier is located on the eastern slopes of the peak.

Middle Teton is a classic pyramidal alpine peak and is sometimes included as part of the Cathedral Group of high Teton peaks. The 40-mile-long (64 km) Teton Range is the youngest mountain chain in the Rocky Mountains, beginning its uplift 9 million years ago, during the Miocene. Several periods of glaciation have carved Middle Teton and the other peaks of the range into their current shapes. From the Lower Saddle, a distinctive feature known as the black dike appears as a straight line running from near the top of the mountain down 800 feet (240 m). The black dike is a basaltic intrusion that occurred long after the surrounding rock was formed.

== Climbing ==
The first recorded ascent of Middle Teton was by Albert R. Ellingwood on August 23, 1923, via Ellingwood Couloir on the south side of the peak. Ellingwood made the first ascent of South Teton the same day.

What is known as the southwest couloir provides the easiest route to the summit. Other sections on the mountain are rated as high as class 5.11, with the Middle Teton Glacier route considered to be the most technically advanced. The first ascent of the Glacier Route was completed on August 4, 1944, by Paul Bradt and Sterling Hendricks. This route is described as a "classic", and is one of the few early season purely ice and snow routes in the Teton Range.

== See also ==
- Geology of the Grand Teton area
