= Middle Teton Glacier =

Glacier in Wyoming, United States

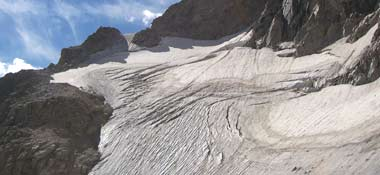
- Middle Teton Glacier

- Location within Wyoming
- Type: Mountain glacier
- Location: Grand Teton National Park, Teton County, Wyoming, USA
- Coordinates: 43°43′57″N 110°48′16″W
- Terminus: Moraine
- Status: Retreating

Middle Teton Glacier is on the northeast flank of Middle Teton in Grand Teton National Park, Wyoming. The alpine glacier is a popular mountaineering route for ice climbing and for access to the summit of Middle Teton and other peaks to the south. The glacier is at the west end of Garnet Canyon, which is the most popular route used by climbers ascending Grand Teton. The glacier melt feeds streams below including Spalding Falls, an 80 ft (24 m) high cascade. Between 1967 and 2006, Middle Teton Glacier lost approximately 25 percent of its surface area, shrinking from 52 to 39 acres (21 to 16 ha).

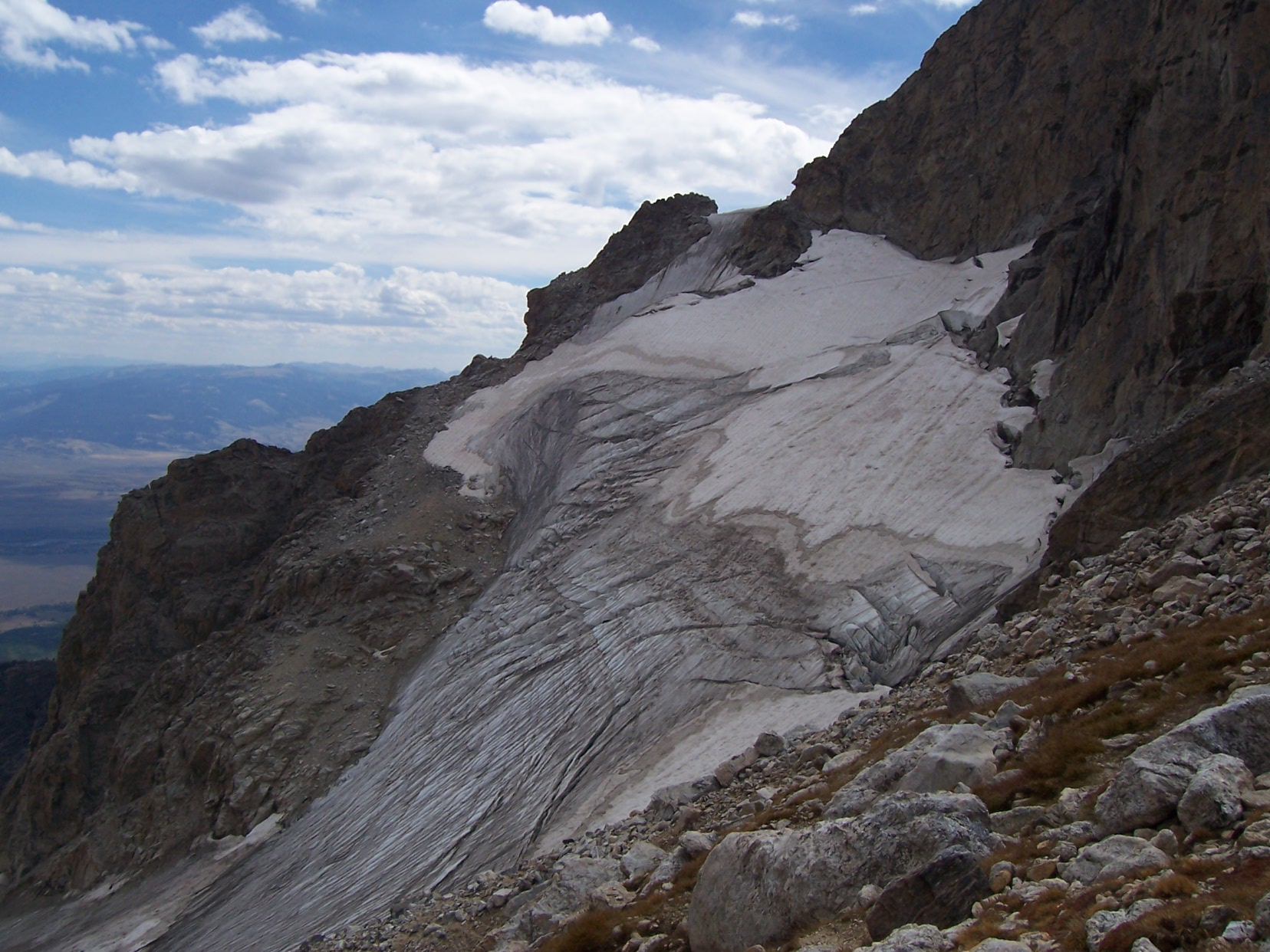
Middle Teton Glacier from the north

== See also ==
- List of glaciers in the United States
