= Teton Range =

Mountain range in Wyoming, United States

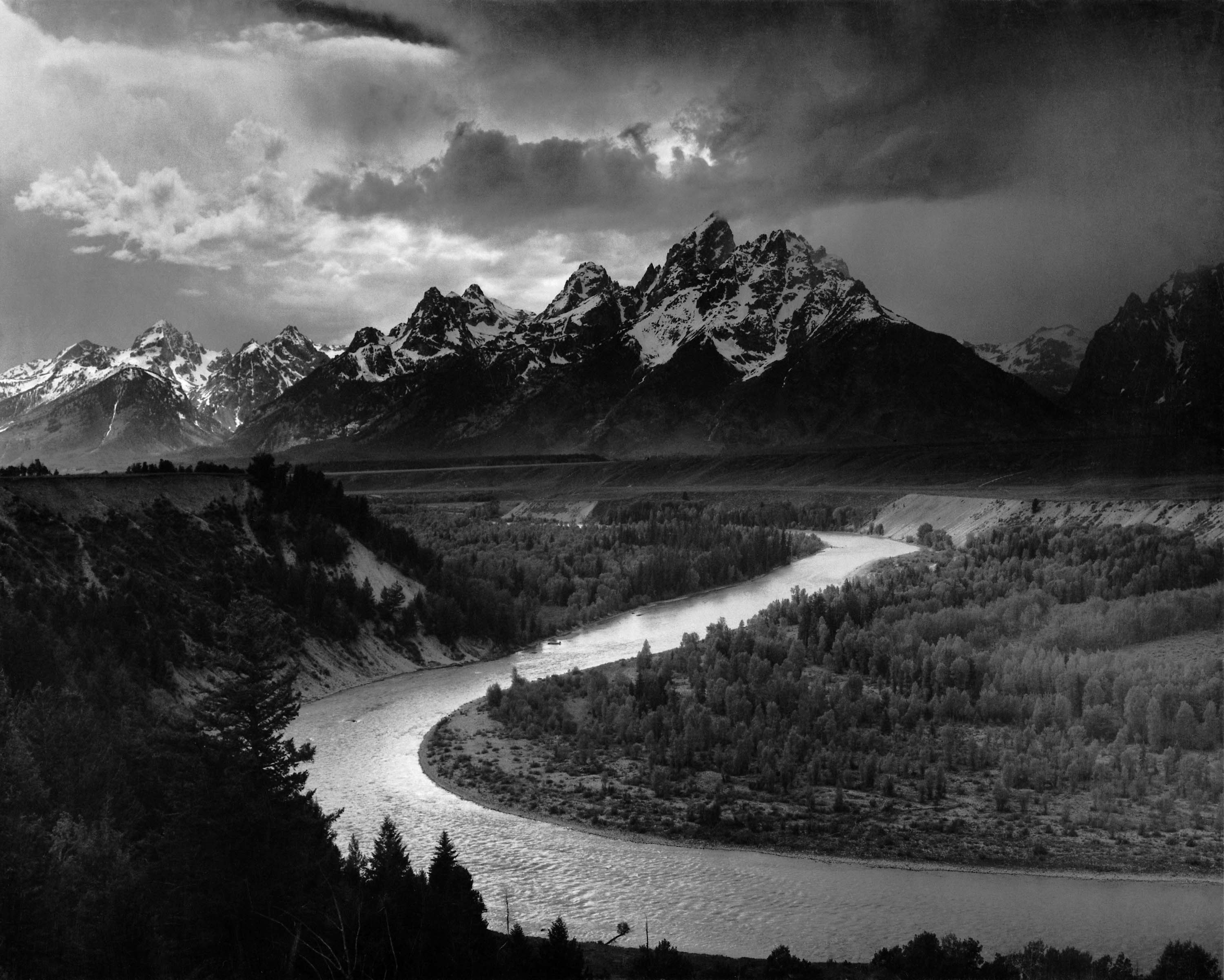
- Teton Range, from the Snake River overlook, by Ansel Adams

Highest point
- Peak: Grand Teton
- Elevation: 13,775 ft (4,199 m) NAVD 88
- Coordinates: 43°44′28″N 110°48′06″W

Dimensions
- Length: 40 mi (64 km)
- Width: 12 mi (19 km)

Geography
- Country: United States
- State: Wyoming
- Range coordinates: 43°45′N 110°50′W
- Parent range: Rocky Mountains

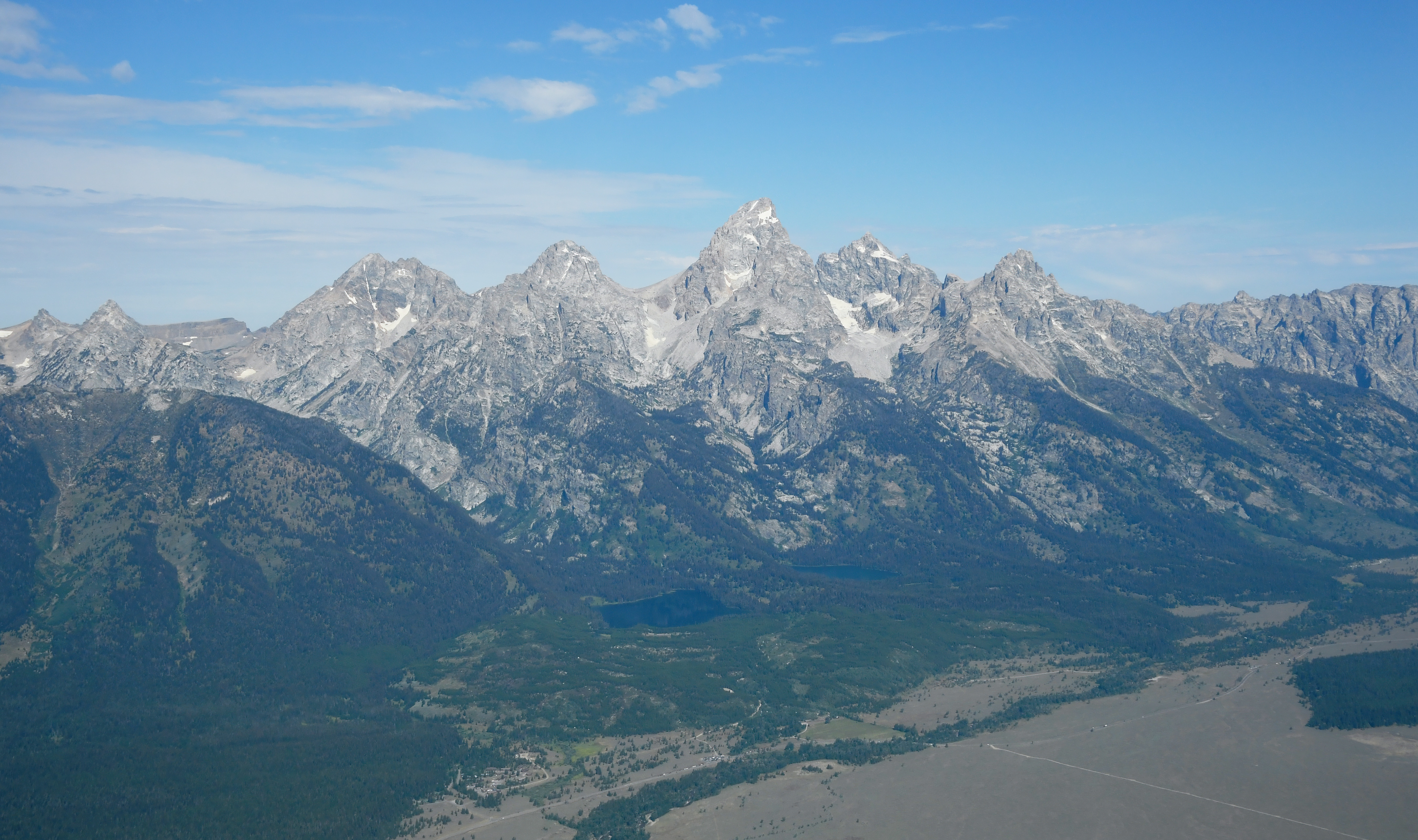
Aerial view of the Cathedral Group of the Teton Range from the southeast with South Teton, Nez Perce Peak, Middle Teton, Grand Teton, Mount Owen, Teewinot Mountain (from left to right; see the image annotations), Taggart Lake (left), and Bradley Lake (right)

The Teton Range, or simply the Tetons, is a mountain range of the Rocky Mountains in North America. It extends for approximately 40 miles (64 km) in a north–south direction through the U.S. state of Wyoming, east of the Idaho state line. It is south of Yellowstone National Park, and most of the east side of the range is within Grand Teton National Park.

One theory says the early French voyageurs named the range les trois tétons ("the three breasts") after the breast-like shapes of its peaks. Another theory says the range is named for the Teton Sioux (from Thítȟuŋwaŋ), also known as the Lakota people. It is likely that the local Shoshone people once called the whole range Teewinot, meaning "many pinnacles".

The principal summits of the central massif, sometimes referred to as the Cathedral Group, are Grand Teton (13,775 feet; 4,199 m), Mount Owen (12,928 feet; 3,940 m), Teewinot (12,325 feet; 3,757 m), Middle Teton (12,804 feet; 3,903 m) and South Teton (12,514 feet; 3,814 m). Other peaks in the range include Mount Moran (12,605 feet; 3,842 m), Mount Wister (11,490 feet; 3,500 m), Buck Mountain (11,938 feet; 3,639 m) and Static Peak (11,303 feet; 3,445 m).

== Geology ==
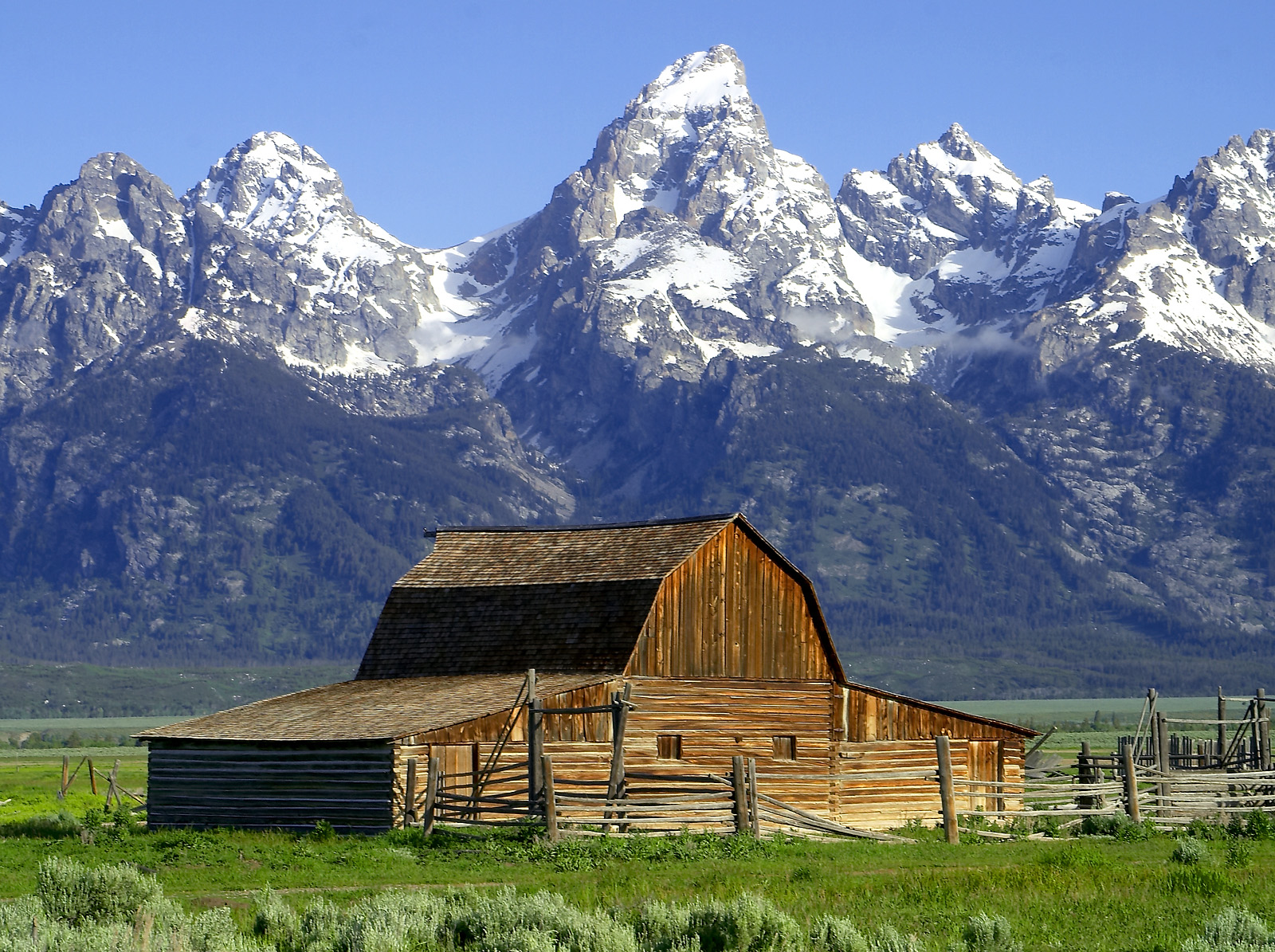
The Teton Range rises dramatically above Mormon Row

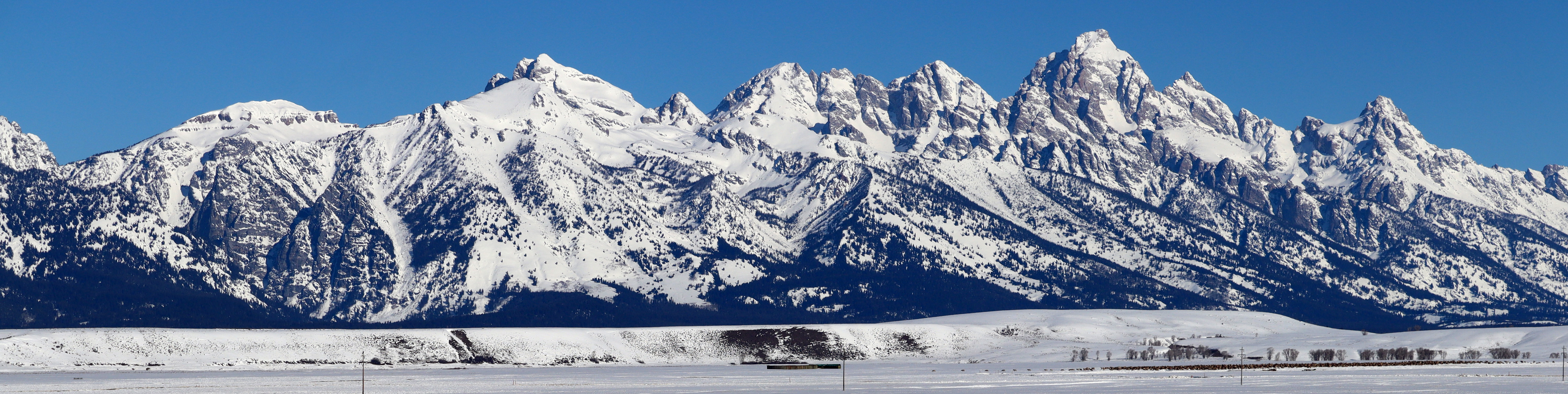
The Teton Range as seen from the National Elk Refuge, March 2024

Between six and nine million years ago, stretching and thinning of the Earth's crust caused movement along the Teton fault. The west block along the fault line rose to form the Teton Range, creating the youngest mountain range in the Rocky Mountains. The fault's east block fell to form the valley called Jackson Hole. The geological processes that led to the current composition of the oldest rocks in the Teton Range began about 2.5 billion years ago. At that time, sand and volcanic debris settled into an ancient ocean. Additional sediment was deposited for millions of years and eventually heat and pressure metamorphosed the sediment into gneiss.

Subsequently, magma was forced up through the cracks in the gneiss to form granite, anywhere from inches to hundreds of feet thick. Other intrusive igneous rocks are noticeable as the black dikes of diabase, visible on the southeast face of Mount Moran and on the Grand Teton. Starting during the Cambrian period, deep deposits of sedimentary rock were deposited in shallow seas over the metamorphic basement rocks. Erosion and uplift have exposed the metamorphic and intrusive igneous rocks now visible on the east slope of the range and in the Cathedral Group and the Paleozoic and Cenozoic sedimentary rocks on the west slope. As recently as 2.1 million years ago the Huckleberry Ridge Tuff was deposited along the west slope of the north part of the range.

One reason the Teton Range is famous is because of the dramatic elevation profile visible from the eastern side, which rises sharply from 4,000 to 7,000 feet (1,200–2,100 m) above the valley floor. Unlike most mountain ranges, the east side of the Teton Range lacks significant foothills or lower peaks which might obscure the view. This is due to the presence of the Teton Fault at the base of the east slope as well as the range being too young to have eroded into soft hills. The Snake River flows southward through the valley before turning to the west and entering Idaho.

== As a filming location ==
The Tetons and Jackson Hole have been the setting for a number of films, including John Wayne's film acting debut in The Big Trail in 1930 and the western film classic Shane in 1953. Mount Moran and the surrounding mountains were used as a backdrop for the lake/swamp setting in the original television series Land of the Lost. In addition, this mountain range is shown on the cover of rapper Kanye West's eighth studio album Ye.

== See also ==
- Geology of the Grand Teton area
- List of mountain ranges in Wyoming
