= Garnet Canyon =

Canyon in Wyoming

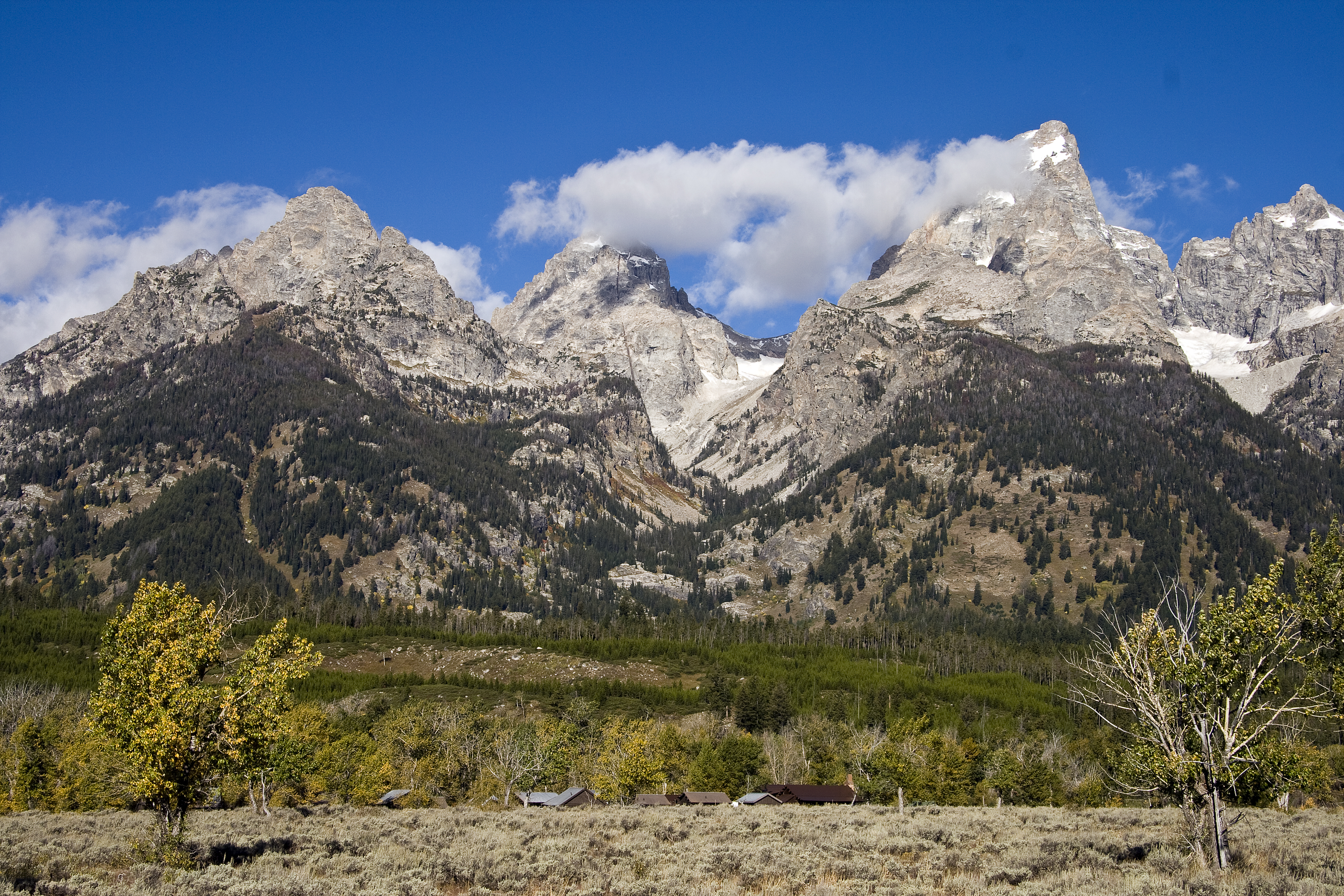
- Garnet Canyon from Jackson Hole nestled between Nez Perce Peak at left and Grand Teton at right. Middle Teton looms at the head of the canyon.

Geography
- Country: United States
- State: Wyoming
- County: Teton
- Coordinates: 43°43′02″N 110°45′45″W
- Lake: Bradley Lake
- Interactive map of Garnet Canyon

Garnet Canyon is located in Grand Teton National Park in the U.S. state of Wyoming. The canyon was formed by retreating glaciers which reached their Last Glacial Maximum around 15,000 years ago. While Garnet Canyon is a less popular destination for recreational hikers than nearby Cascade Canyon or Death Canyon, it is an important approach to many significant and popular mountaineering climbs including routes found on Grand Teton, Middle Teton, South Teton and Disappointment Peak.

The trailhead for Garnet Canyon is found at Lupine Meadows, and the canyon itself is reached after several miles of hiking through forest and switchbacks which climb a large lateral moraine. The entrance to the canyon is guarded by a boulderfield that requires some Class 3 scrambling to cross. Beyond the boulderfield is the popular camping area known as the Meadows, above which the canyon divides into north and south forks. The north fork leads up to the lower saddle between Middle Teton and Grand Teton and is the starting point for many classic climbs on Grand Teton. The south fork climbs up to a saddle between Middle Teton and South Teton and is the starting point for some of the easier routes up those two summits.

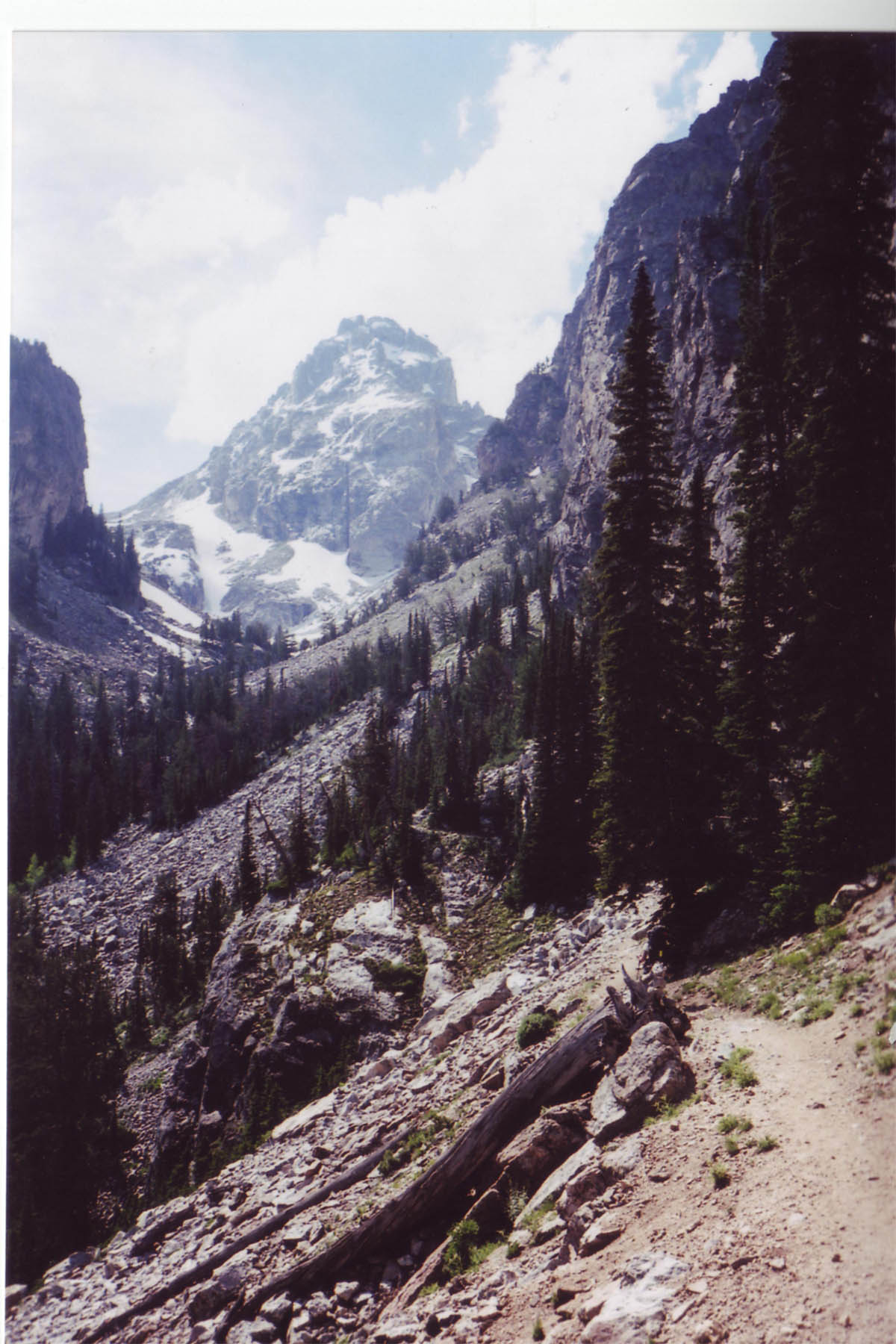
Middle Teton viewed from Garnet Canyon

Backcountry camping is allowed, by permit, in Garnet Canyon at areas designated by the National Park Service. Camping permits can be obtained in advance via registration or in person at the Jenny Lake Ranger Station.

== See also ==
- Canyons of the Teton Range
- Geology of the Grand Teton area
