= Historical buildings and structures of Grand Teton National Park =

- Grand Teton National Park Multiple Property Submission
- U.S. National Register of Historic Places
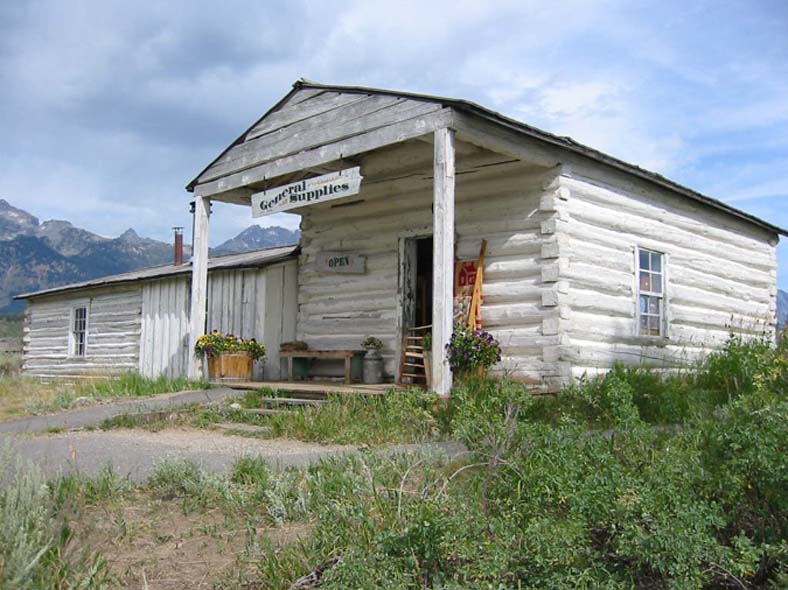
- Menor's Ferry homestead

- Location within Wyoming Location within the United States
- Coordinates: 43°44′0″N 110°48′12″W
- Architectural style: NPS-Rustic style, local vernacular
- MPS: Grand Teton National Park MPS
- NRHP reference No.: 64500738

The historical buildings and structures of Grand Teton National Park include a variety of buildings and built remains that pre-date the establishment of Grand Teton National Park, together with facilities built by the National Park Service to serve park visitors. Many of these places and structures have been placed on the National Register of Historic Places. The pre-Park Service structures include homestead cabins from the earliest settlement of Jackson Hole, working ranches that once covered the valley floor, and dude ranches or guest ranches that catered to the tourist trade that grew up in the 1920s and 1930s, before the park was expanded to encompass nearly all of Jackson Hole. Many of these were incorporated into the park to serve as Park Service personnel housing, or were razed to restore the landscape to a natural appearance. Others continued to function as inholdings under a life estate in which their former owners could continue to use and occupy the property until their death. Other buildings, built in the mountains after the initial establishment of the park in 1929, or in the valley after the park was expanded in 1950, were built by the Park Service to serve park visitors, frequently employing the National Park Service Rustic style of design.

== Homesteads ==
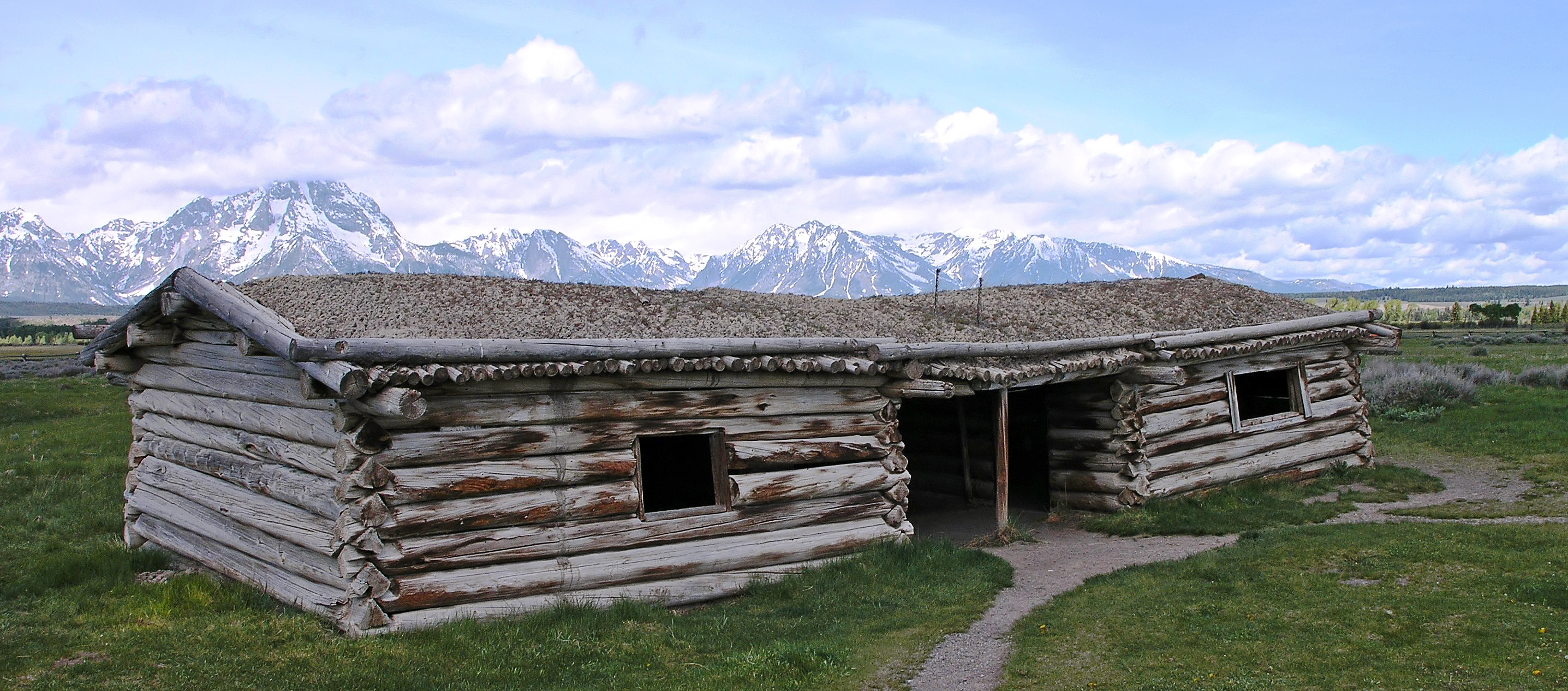
Cunningham Cabin

The earliest remaining built object in Grand Teton National Park is a diversion ditch, now known as Mining Ditch, which carried water in the vicinity of Schwabacher's Landing for prospecting activities. Dug around 1871-72, the ditch lent its name to nearby Ditch Creek. The prospectors left no other trace in Jackson Hole.

The valley's first permanent settlers did not arrive until 1884, when John Holland and John Carnes claimed a homestead to the north of Jackson, of which no trace remains. The Cunningham Cabin is the earliest remaining relic of settlement in the northern portion of Jackson Hole. It was built by J. Pierce Cunningham in 1885, at about the same time as the town of Jackson was established at the southern end of Jackson Hole. William D. Menor established Menor's Ferry across the Snake River in 1892, homesteading the lands on the western bank of the river, and operating the ferry until a bridge was built in 1927.

The Luther Taylor Cabins near Kelly were built beginning in 1916. The cabins were featured in the 1953 Western movie Shane.

The Manges Cabin was built by James Manges, the second homesteader after Bill Menor to settle on the west side of the Snake. Manges' operation grew to become a working ranch, later the Elbo Dude Ranch, which featured a racetrack and rodeo grounds. The perceived blight of the Elbo development, so close to the mountains, led Struthers Burt and other local citizens to consider strategies for land preservation in the valley in the 1920s. The Elbo was acquired by the Park Service in 1956, and after some time as employee lodging, was gradually demolished to allow the site to return to its natural state. The Manges Cabin is the only remnant.

Homestead buildings were crude, using hewn timber harvested locally and resting on minimal foundations, excavation being difficult in the valley's stony soil. Log construction was employed almost universally, given the absence of local sawmills. This rustic local construction practice was to make a return as the economic focus of the valley shifted from agricultural development to tourism.

== Working ranches ==
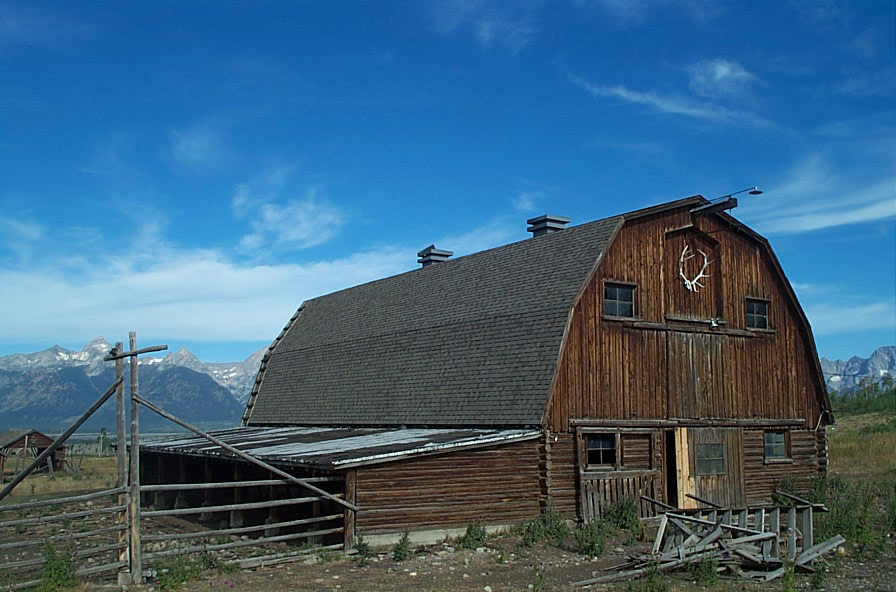
Hunter hereford barn

With the advent of large-scale ranches worked by extended families with staffs of cowboys, wranglers and hired help, Jackson Hole saw the construction of planned complexes of buildings, as opposed to ad hoc assemblages of sheds and cabins. The new structures used milled lumber and typical western carpentry details in keeping with Wyoming construction practices. The working ranches moved away from rustic design, reflecting a maturing social order in the newly populated valley, which by 1909 had three sawmills to provide sawn lumber.

One of the earliest ranchers was Josiah David Ferrin, also known as "Uncle Si," who became a successful cattle rancher selling beef to crews building Jackson Lake Dam. The Elk Ranch at its height had 2000 cattle on 400 acres (160 ha) near Moran. Ferrin sold the property to the Snake River Land Company in 1928.

In the first decade of the 20th century, Mormon settlers established a farming community in the Antelope Flats area of Jackson Hole. Becoming known as Mormon Row, the settlement extends as a line of farms, or "line village," along the former Jackson-Moran Road, with irrigated farmsteads running perpendicular to the road. The six homestead complexes once covered the area between the Gros Ventre River and Blacktail Butte. Individual farms included the Andy Chambers, John Moulton and T.A. Moulton homesteads. The Andy Chambers Ranch is the most complete of the surviving ranches.

The Hunter Hereford Ranch was a 1909 homestead on the eastern side of Jackson Hole that became a hobby ranch for William and Eileen Hunter in the 1940s. Its spectacular location led to its use as a movie set in the 1950s and also 1960's. In summer 1969 the movie "The Wild Country" was filmed in the Kelly area. The film rebuilt the Hunter Hereford barn and added some new ranch like structures. All of the filming was in the valley, some near the Hunter ranch and other scenes shots to the south close to Kelly. The property was sold to the Park Service in 1957, but operated as a ranch even after Eileen Hunter's death in 1989. While the residential areas have been demolished, much of the working ranch facility remains.

Joe Pfeifer, a former miner from Butte, Montana, established a homestead near Mormon Row in November 1910. The homestead's well-preserved remains were burned in a 1994 brush fire, but were documented by the Historic American Buildings Survey in 1979 and 1992.

Geraldine Lucas arrived in Jackson Hole following her 1912 retirement from teaching in New York at the age of 47. She built a cabin in 1912, eventually amassing several hundred acres of lands and becoming a significant opponent of the Rockefeller-backed Snake River Land Company. However, following Lucas' death, the Lucas property was acquired in 1944 by the Snake River Land Company and was used as the residence for its general manager, whose life estate ran until 1975, after which it was turned over to the Park Service.

== Dude ranches and guest ranches ==
=== Dude ranches ===
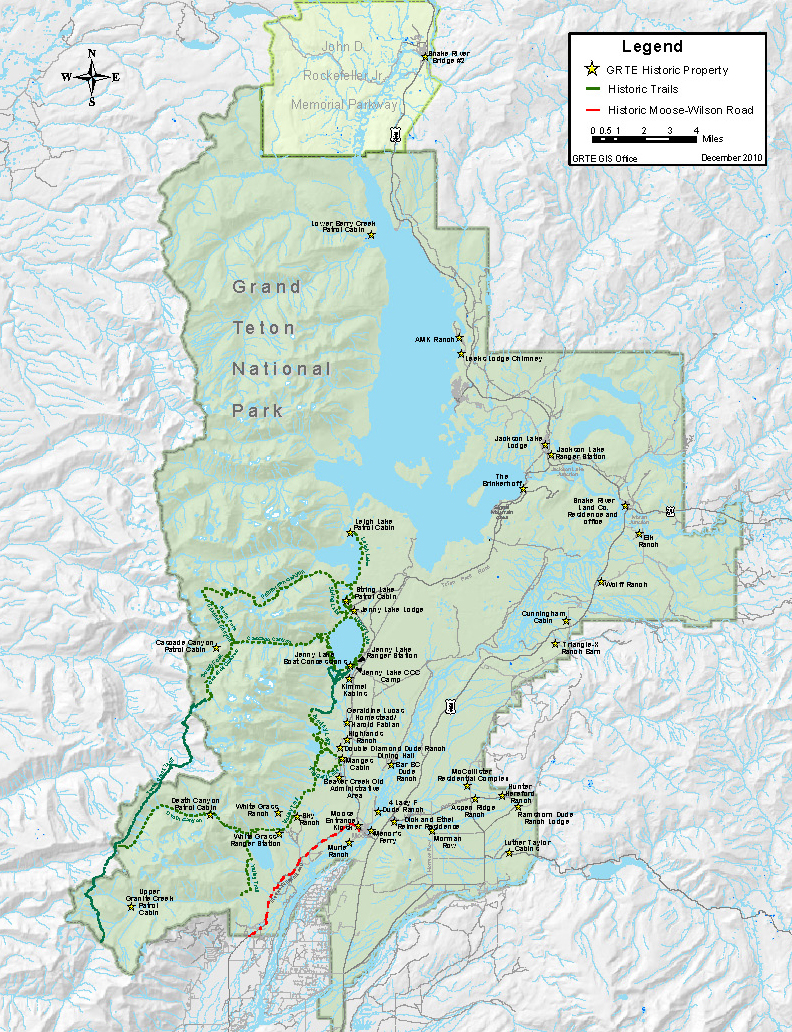
Map of the historical structures of Grand Teton National Park

The first dude ranch in Jackson Hole was the JY Ranch, which was converted from a working ranch. It became the property of the Rockefeller family when the Rockefellers started acquiring land in Jackson Hole, remaining an inholding as the family gradually donated portions to the Park Service. The final portion of the JY became the Laurance S. Rockefeller Preserve in Grand Teton National Park in 2008. The Bar B C Dude Ranch was the first dude ranch in Jackson Hole to be conceived as a dude ranch from its inception. Established in 1912, it strongly influenced later dude ranch development and had a significant role in the development of tourism in Jackson Hole. The Bar BC owed much of its success to its co-owner, author Struthers Burt, who had started the JY and who published Diary of a Dude Wrangler in the Saturday Evening Post in 1924. The White Grass Dude Ranch was established in 1913, when George Tucker Bispham, a former Bar B C employee, and Harold Hammond consolidated their adjoining working ranches right at the foot of the Tetons. The White Grass inholding operated as a dude ranch until 1985, when its life estate expired, the longest-active dude ranch in the valley. After a period of abandonment and deterioration, the White Grass was rehabilitated as the Western Center for Historic Preservation in a joint venture between the National Trust for Historic Preservation and the National Park Service. The Double Diamond Dude Ranch was started in 1924 by Joseph Clark and Fran William, initially catering primarily to boys from Eastern families. While most of its buildings were destroyed by a wildfire in 1985, the ranch's 1945 dining hall survives. The area is now known as the Climbers Ranch, used as a base camp for mountain climbers.

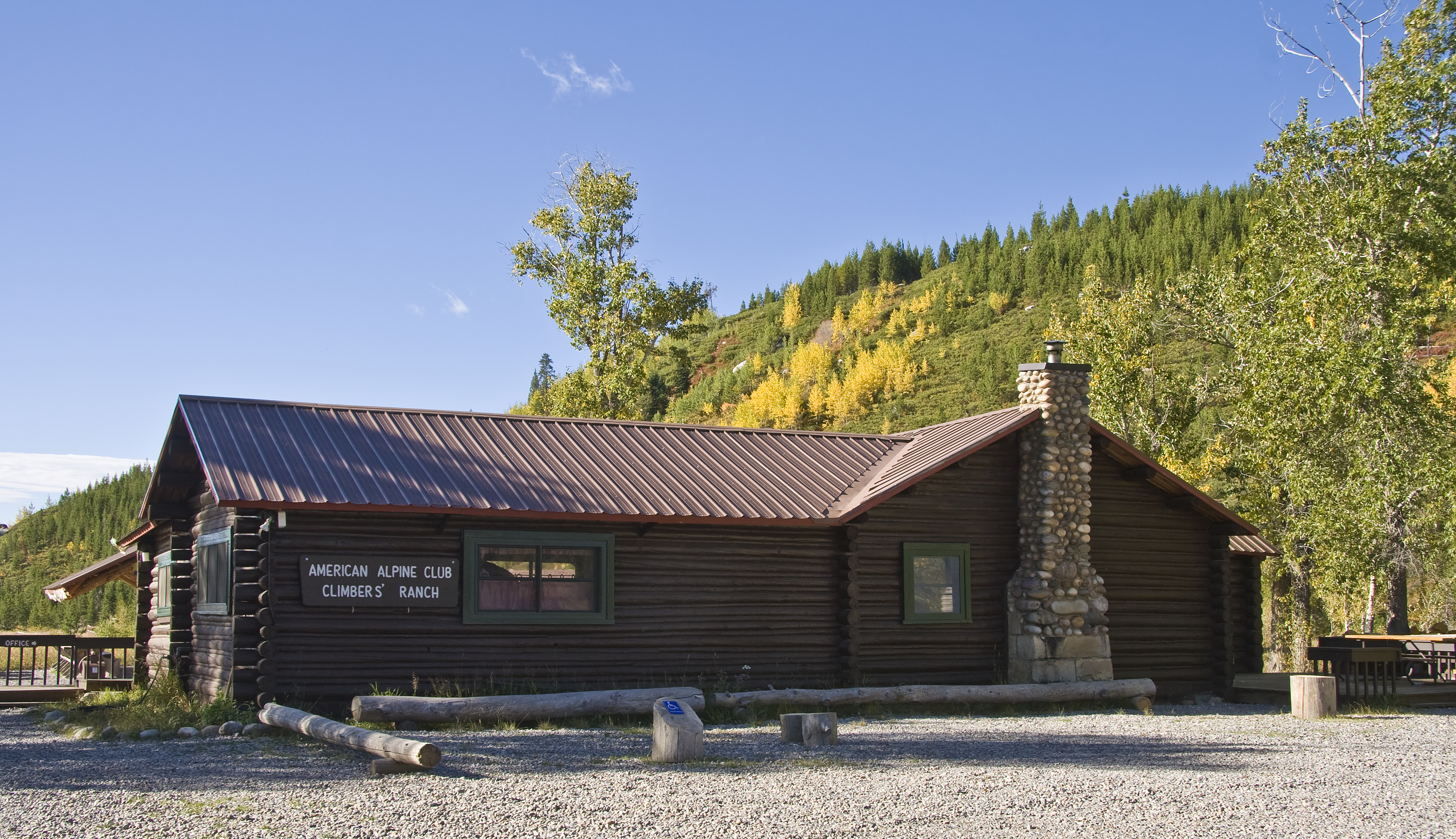
Double Diamond Ranch, also known as Climbers' Ranch

The Flying V Ranch was established in 1921 as a dude ranch, but was sold in 1935 to Gustav Koven and Paul Petzoldt, who intended to operate the ranch as a climbing school. After changing the name to the Ramshorn Dude Ranch, the partnership fell apart. After acquisition by the Park Service in 1956 the Ramshorn was operated as a concession under the Elbo Ranch name, which had been displaced from its previous location at the foot of the mountains when the original Elbo-Manges ranch was purchased and used for Park Service personnel housing. The Ramshorn now houses the Teton Science School. Another 1920s establishment was Leek's Lodge on upper Jackson Lake, close to the AMK, which continued to operate as a concession associated with the Signal Mountain Lodge into the 1970s. Although the Park Service had removed most of the buildings, the main lodge stood until 1998, when it was destroyed by fire, leaving only the lodge's chimney standing. The original Jackson Lake Lodge was established nearby by Eugene Amoretti, and featured the first hot and cold running water in the valley. It was replaced by the present Jackson Lake Lodge in 1955.

The Triangle X Ranch was established in 1926 on the east side of Jackson Hole and is the last dude ranch operating in the park. The Turner family was from Utah, and after failing to grow potatoes, took to guiding hunting trips. The Triangle X operated both as outfitters and as dude ranchers. The Triangle X Barn, built in 1928 of salvaged materials, is listed on the National Register.

The STS Dude Ranch was established by Buster and Frances Ester on the west bank of the Snake River a little south of Menor's Ferry in 1921. The unprofitable operation was purchased by conservationists Olaus Murie, his wife Margaret (Mardie) Murie and scientist Adolph Murie and his wife Louise. Adolph and Louise lived in the original ranch complex, while Olaus and Mardie lived in a house they built nearby on the property. The Murie Ranch hosted some of the first meetings of The Wilderness Society in the 1950s. The Murie Ranch was designated a National Historic Landmark in 2006, and is operated as the Murie Center conference facility by the National Park Service.

=== Vacation houses ===
Other ranches took the form of rustic family retreats, rather than as guest ranches. The 4 Lazy F Dude Ranch was started as a working ranch in 1914 by Philadelphian Bryant Mears, who called it the Sun Star. The Mears family sold it to William Frew, a dude from Pittsburgh, who renamed it the 4 Lazy F for the "four lazy Frews." The Frews operated the ranch as both a family retreat and as a dude ranch for a few selected guests. It remains in the Frew family as a life estate inholding. The AMK Ranch, established in the 1920s on the east side of Jackson Lake, was a personal retreat for William Johnson of The Hoover Company. Alfred Berolzheimer of the Eagle (later Berol) pencil company bought the ranch in 1936, greatly expanding it in a high-rustic style. The Brinkerhoff, on the shore of Jackson Lake near Signal Mountain, was a pure vacation lodge, built in 1946 by oil executive Zach Brinkerhoff and furnished with Thomas C. Molesworth furniture. The Sky Ranch at the outlet of Death Canyon was established in 1953 as a summer retreat for the Balderston family, close to the White Grass ranch. William Balderston had been a surveyor and photographer for the Jackson Lake Dam project in 1914, going on to eventually become the president of the Philco Corporation. The Balderston family were regular guests at the White Grass, and friends of the Muries. They bought 13.66 acres (5.53 ha) of White Grass property from Frank Galey in 1952. Balderston hired Philadelphia architect John Arnold Bower to design a small group of cabins, a barn and support structures.

Retired politician John Hogan bought a homestead on the east side of the park in 1926 for use as a guest ranch and fox farm. In 1930 the ranch was purchased by the Snake River Land Company and was its headquarters while the Rockefeller-owned company was assembling lands in Jackson Hole for donation to the Park Service. The main house was occupied by SRLC manager Harold Fabian and his wife Josephine until 1945, when they moved to the Geraldine Lucas homestead on the other side of the valley. Donated as part of the SRLC lands in the 1950s, the house was used as a dormitory by the Park Service for a time.

Other significant extant vacation homes, dude ranches and small working ranches include Dick and Ethel Reimer House, built in 1938 between Moose and Mormon Row at the end of Blacktail Butte, and the McCollister residential complex farther to the east on Antelope Flats Road. Paul W. McCollister was the primary developer of Teton Village. The McCollister compound was built and expanded between 1953 and 1987. The Aspen Ridge Ranch, in the same area, is a complex of modest log residential and agricultural buildings, built in 1910 and expanded in 1946. The Wolff Ranch, located farther north near Moran, is small dude ranch complex established in the 1940s by Stippy Wolff and Frank Allen.

=== Tourist camps ===
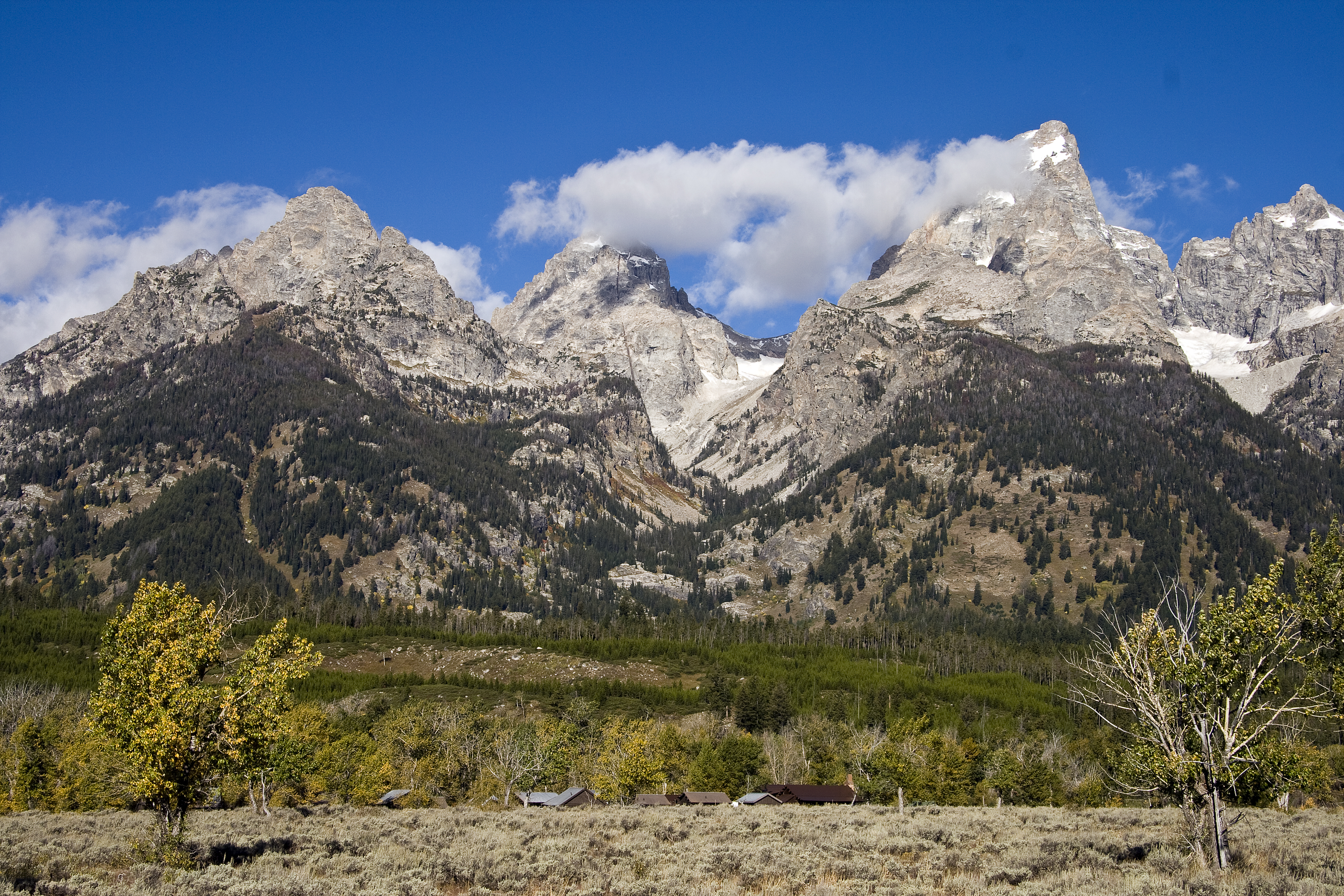
The central Teton Range with the Highlands Historic District in the foreground

In the 1930s increasing numbers of visitors began to arrive in the park by automobile, and accommodations were developed to suit the new, more transient tourists. The Kimmel Kabins, established in 1937 by J.D. and Lura Kimmel, are the last example of as many as twelve similar motor court-type lodgings in the park. Its remaining structures are used to house Park Service personnel. Harry and Elizabeth Sensenbach were earlier pioneers in this market, opening their homestead in front of the Cathedral Group to automobile tourists. The Sensenbach operation was bought in 1946 by Charles Byron, Jeanne Jenkins and Gloria Jenkins Wardell, who expanded the operation as the Highlands guest ranch. The Highlands was acquired by the Park Service in 1972 and used for employee housing. The Signal Mountain Lodge was one of several ventures by the Wort family, starting in the 1920s as Ole Warner's fishing camp. The Worts developed the property after they purchased it in 1931, adding cabins and a small lodge. They sold the camp in 1940, when it acquired its present name. Apart from a few cabins, most of the resort is of relatively recent construction.

Jimmy Manges, whose old ranch became the first Elbo Ranch, had built a cabin on his remaining land near the Double Diamond in 1926. He gradually created a guest camp on the property, calling it the X Quarter Circle X. The camp expanded to twenty cabins by the 1940s, when his nephew Irwin Lesher and Irwin's wife Marvel took over management and improved the camp's standard of hygiene. The Leshers continued to manage the camp after Jimmy's death in 1960 until Lesher sold out to the Park Service in 1980.

The 1925 Chapel of the Transfiguration catered to the tourist trade. Built and owned by St. John's Episcopal Church, the chapel was built near Menor's Ferry, in an area that became known as Moose. The grounds and church interior focus on the Cathedral Group of peaks, all in a consciously rustic style that emphasizes the natural environment over the built environment. The Chapel of the Sacred Heart was built in similar rustic style near Signal Mountain by the Our Lady of the Mountains Catholic Church of Jackson in 1958.

The dude ranches and guest ranches were overwhelmingly rustic in style, representing a return to log construction and deliberately "Western"-looking details, as a way of appealing to eastern dudes looking for an informal retreat reminiscent of the frontier.

== Park Service infrastructure ==
=== Early development ===
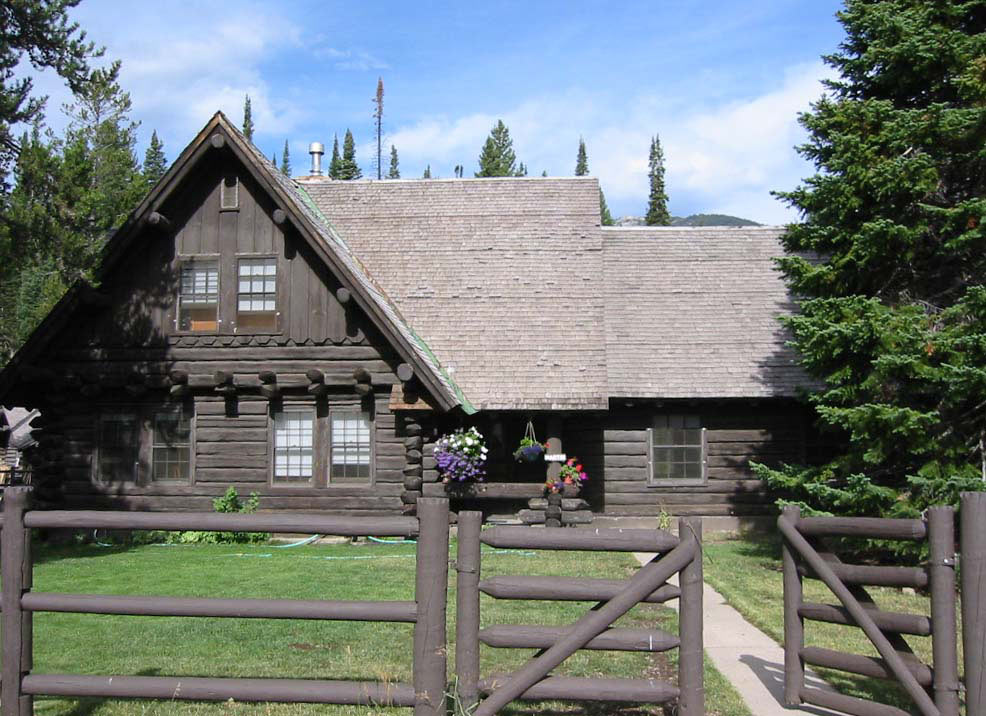
Superintendent's Residence at Beaver Creek

Grand Teton National Park was designated in 1929 to encompass only the Teton Range and a narrow strip of land at the foot of the mountains including Jenny Lake and several smaller lakes. Nearly all of Jackson Hole was excluded from the park in the face of opposition from ranching interests. At the same time, the Rockefeller family, using the shield of the Snake River Land Company, began to buy lands in the valley for preservation and eventual donation to an expanded park. The SRLC lands were added to Jackson Hole National Monument in 1949, and Grand Teton National Park absorbed the monument lands in 1950.

During the 1930s the Park Service began to build visitor and administrative facilities in the original park lands. The park's first point of visitor contact was, for many years, at Jenny Lake. The Jenny Lake Ranger Station comprised purpose-built structures as well as structures moved to the site from elsewhere. Chief of these relocated structures were the former Lee Manges cabin, built about 1925 and moved to the site to become the ranger station, and the Crandall Photo Studio, built around 1925-26 and later moved to the site. In the 1930s the Park Service added rustic public toilet facilities, called "comfort stations." The White Grass Ranger Station was built to a standardized Park Service plan in 1930.

The park had already inherited a number of similar structures built by the U.S. Forest Service prior to the 1929 establishment of the park, including the Leigh Lake Ranger Patrol Cabin and the Lower Berry Creek Patrol Cabin in the northern reaches of the park.

As the Great Depression wore on, the Park Service received help from Civilian Conservation Corps labor, and a CCC camp was established at Jenny Lake. The CCC built the Cascade Canyon and Death Canyon barns, as well as the Moran Bay and Upper Granite Canyon patrol cabins. Despite their names, the barns were patrol cabins, built to standard Park Service designs from the Branch of Plans and Designs, and intentionally designed in the National Park Service Rustic style. The CCC built three comfort stations as well, including the String Lake Comfort Station, originally located at Jenny Lake.

The largest concentration of structures from this era comprise the Old Administrative Area Historic District at Beaver Creek. The park headquarters, superintendent's residence, four employee residences and three warehouses were designed in Park Service Rustic style and built by the CCC between 1934 and 1939. The Moose Entrance Kiosk was built nearby, and has since been moved to Moose. Private development in the 1930s included the Jenny Lake Boat Concession Facilities, built by Charles Wort, who held a legacy concessioner's permit originally issued by the Forest Service, and who built a boathouse on Jenny Lake. Wort's family went on to establish the Wort Hotel in Jackson and the Signal Mountain Lodge. Robert Reimer, who took over the Wort concession at Jenny Lake in 1935, added a personal residence to the Jenny Lake ensemble.

=== Park expansion ===
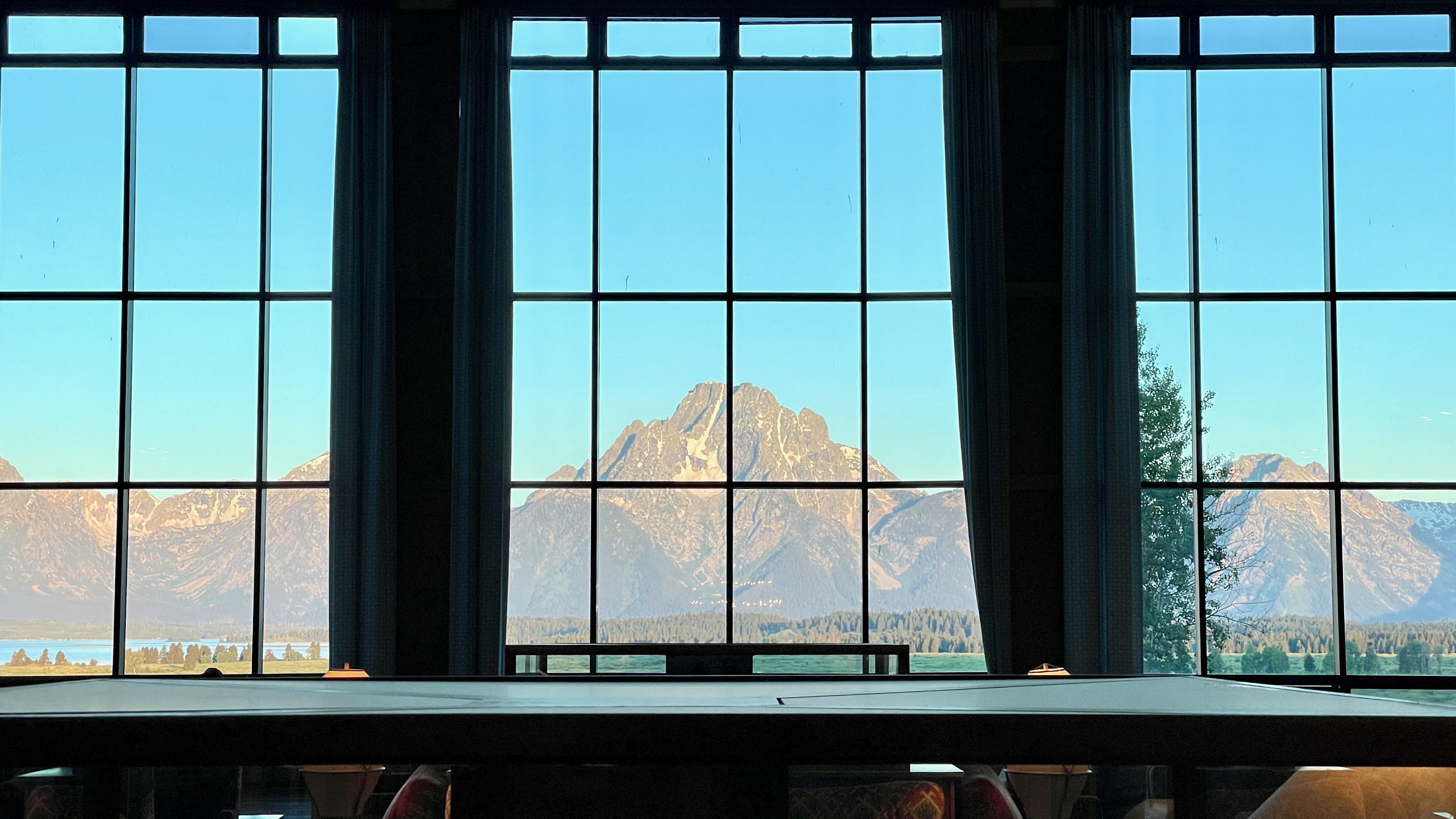
Mount Moran from Jackson Lake Lodge

The expansion of the park into Jackson Hole brought a requirement for new facilities at the new park gateway at Moose. The Mission 66 program was conceived in 1955 to deal with the dramatic increase in visitation, particularly automobile-borne tourism, being experienced Park Service-wide. The Moose Visitor Center, a new administration building, and employee residences were built at Moose, just downstream from Menor's Ferry, where a bridge crossed the Snake River. At about the same time the Colter Bay Village complex was developed on Jackson Lake in the northern part of the park, providing camping, lodging and marina services. The largest development of this era was the new Jackson Lake Lodge, a reinterpretation of the traditional Park Service lodge concept in a modern style by architect Gilbert Stanley Underwood. Underwood, who had designed the rustic Bryce Canyon and Grand Canyon lodges as well as Yosemite's Ahwahnee Hotel, made a sharp break from the naturalistic rustic style, using concrete and steel and straight, sharp lines while he incorporated traditionally rustic colors and textures, framing a view of Mount Moran from the main lobby. The Jackson Lake Lodge was designated a National Historic Landmark in 2003.

== Context ==
The historical structures of Grand Teton National Park span a period of little more than a century. They share a common heritage of rustic design and construction, first from necessity, and later from a common desire on the part of dude ranch operators and the National Park Service to evoke the aesthetics of the Western frontier. Grand Teton is unusual in its extensive inventory of structures from the pre-park period, a legacy of its expansion into areas that had been previously settled.

== See also ==
- National Register of Historic Places listings in Grand Teton National Park
