= Jenny Lake Boat Concession Facilities =

- U.S. National Register of Historic Places
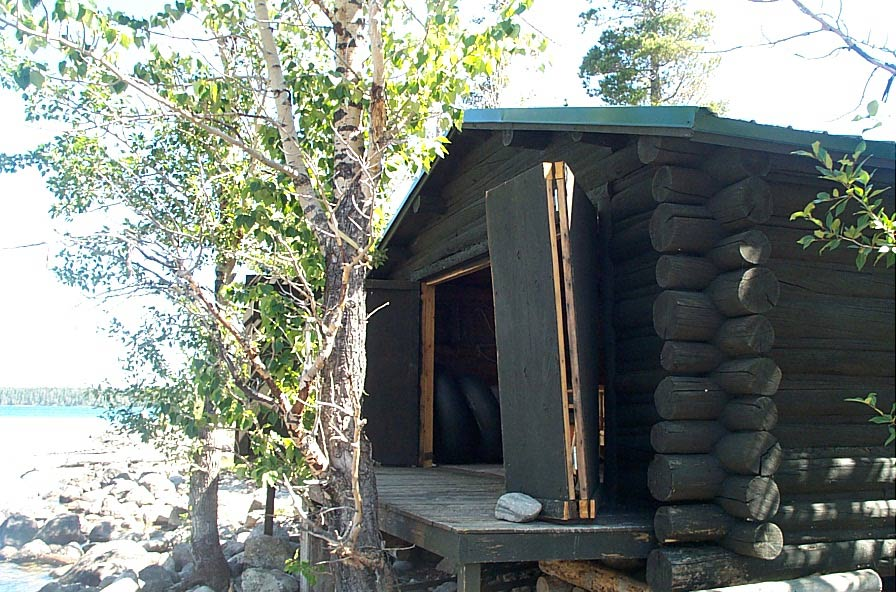
- Jenny Lake boathouse

- Location within Wyoming Location within the United States
- Nearest city: Moose, Wyoming
- Coordinates: 43°45′4″N 110°43′31″W
- Built: 1937
- MPS: Grand Teton National Park MPS
- NRHP reference No.: 98001032
- Added to NRHP: August 24, 1998

The Jenny Lake Boat Concession Facilities, also known as Reimer's Cabin and the Wort Boathouse, are a group of buildings on Jenny Lake in Grand Teton National Park. They include a dock, a boathouse, two employee cabins and Reimer's Cabin. The boathouse was built by concessioner Charles Wort, who held the original U.S. Forest Service use permit from the time before the establishment of Grand Teton National Park, when the lands and lake were under the jurisdiction of the Forest Service. Robert Reimer took over the concession by 1935 and built a personal residence in 1937. The log cabin is an example of the National Park Service Rustic style.

The Jenny Lake developed area includes the Jenny Lake Ranger Station Historic District and Jenny Lake CCC Camp NP-4. Reimer's Cabin was built in 1937 for Robert "Dick" Reimer, who took over the boat concession in 1935. Plans for the cabin were approved by the National Park Service landscape Division, which also supervised construction.

The Jenny Lake boat concession facilities were placed on the National Register of Historic Places on August 24, 1998.

== See also ==
- Wort Hotel, another Wort family venture, and
- Signal Mountain Lodge, operated by the Worts in the 1940s
- Historical buildings and structures of Grand Teton National Park
