= Chapel of the Transfiguration =

Historic church in Wyoming, United States

- U.S. National Register of Historic Places
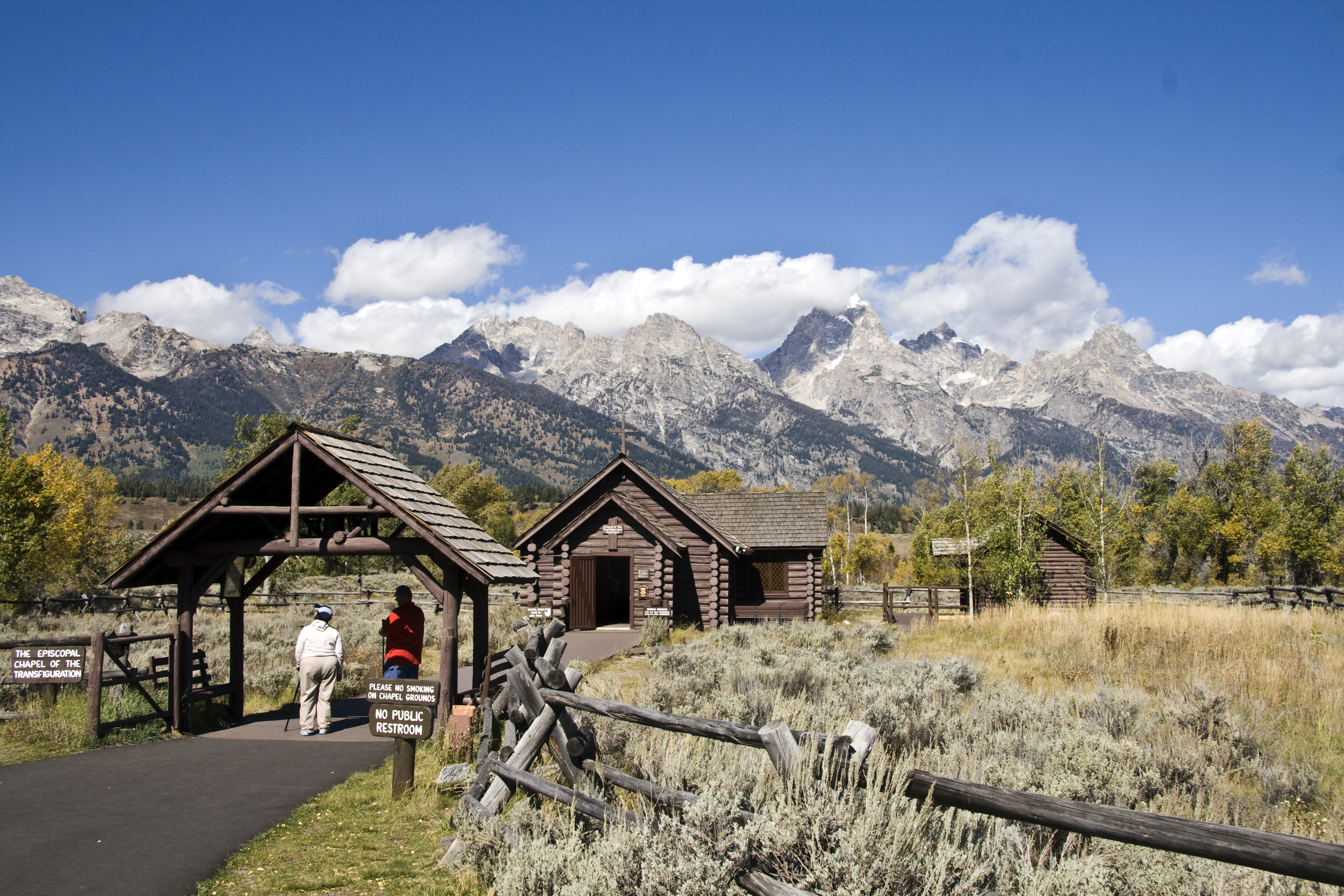

- Location within Wyoming Location within the United States
- Nearest city: Moose, Wyoming
- Coordinates: 43°39′36.4″N 110°42′55.2″W
- Built: 1925
- Architect: C.B. Loomis
- Architectural style: Bungalow/Craftsman
- NRHP reference No.: 80004055
- Added to NRHP: April 10, 1980

The Chapel of the Transfiguration is a small log chapel in Grand Teton National Park, in the community of Moose. The chapel was sited and built to frame a view of the Cathedral Group of peaks in a large window behind the altar. The chapel, which was built in 1925, is owned and operated by St. John's Episcopal Church in Jackson.

== Description ==
The chapel complex is composed of the chapel itself, an entrance canopy that incorporates a small bell tower, and a storage shed. The chapel and accessory buildings were designed by C.B. Loomis in a rustic style, also called Western Craftsman. The entrance canopy aligns the approach on the desired axis to the Cathedral Group and provides shelter to the chain-operated bell. Access to the chapel is by boardwalk, leading to a beveled plank door with decorative ironwork. The 22-foot (6.7 m) by 50-foot (15 m) T-shaped chapel has exposed log interior walls with stained glass windows on either side. Behind the altar on the chapel's axis, a picture window frames a view that substitutes for a stained glass composition. A sacristy stands to one side.

== History ==
The chapel was built to serve guests and employees of the dude ranches that stretched north of Jackson along the base of the Teton Range. The land was donated by Maud Noble, owner of nearby Menor's Ferry, predating the establishment of Grand Teton National Park in 1929 and its expansion into the Moose area in 1950. The design was based on Our Father's House at the St. Michael's Mission in Ethete on the Wind River Indian Reservation. Construction materials, labor and funds were provided by local ranchers. It played a primary role in the movie Spencer's Mountain, which was filmed in Jackson Hole in 1963, and featured Henry Fonda and Maureen O'Hara.

The chapel was placed on the National Register of Historic Places on April 10, 1980 The somewhat larger Chapel of the Sacred Heart was built in the park in similar rustic style near Signal Mountain by the Our Lady of the Mountains Catholic Church of Jackson in 1958.

== See also ==
- Historical buildings and structures of Grand Teton National Park
