= Highlands Historic District (Moose, Wyoming) =

Historic district in Wyoming, United States

- U.S. National Register of Historic Places
- U.S. Historic district
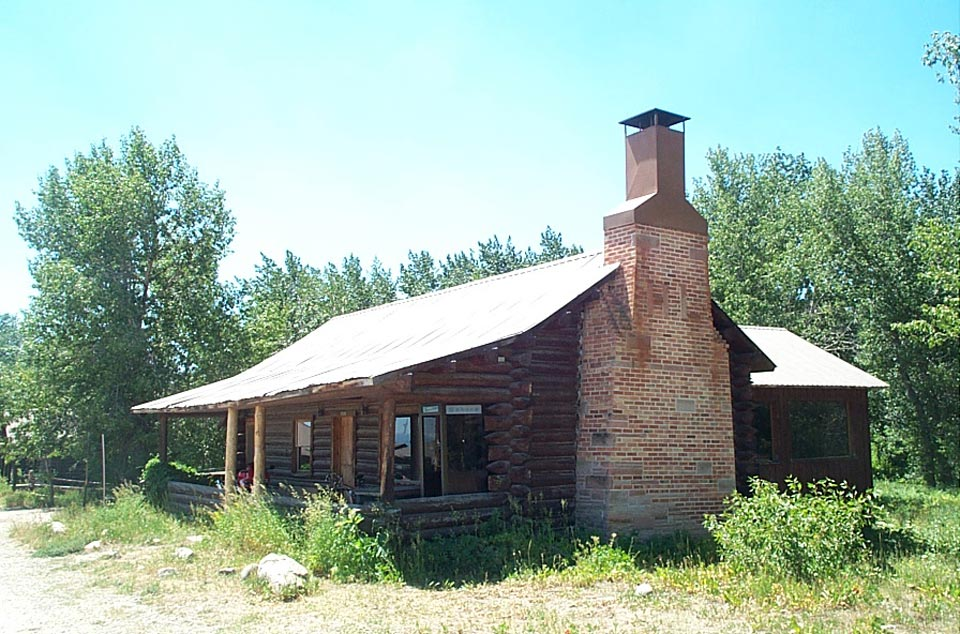
- Highlands Dining Room and Lodge

- Location within Wyoming Location within the United States
- Nearest city: Moose, Wyoming
- Coordinates: 43°42′32″N 110°43′45″W
- MPS: Grand Teton National Park MPS
- NRHP reference No.: 98001029
- Added to NRHP: August 19, 1998

The Highlands Historic District in Grand Teton National Park is a former private inholding within the park boundary. The inholding began as a 1914 homestead belonging to Harry and Elizabeth Sensenbach, who began in the 1920s to supplement their income by catering to automobile-borne tourists. In 1946 the property was purchased by Charles Byron, Jeanne Jenkins and Gloria Jenkins Wardell, who expanded the accommodations by one or two cabins a year in a U-shaped layout around a central lodge. The lodge and cabins are constructed in a rustic log style, considered compatible with park architecture. The Highlands was neither an auto camp, which encouraged short stays, nor a dude ranch, which provided ranch-style activities. The Highlands encouraged stays of moderate length, providing a variety of relatively sedentary amenities. It was the last private-accommodation camp to be built in the park before the Mission 66 program created concessioner-operated facilities on public lands.

The National Park Service acquired the property in 1972 and uses it to house seasonal employees. The acquisition allowed the Park Service to demolish most of the nearby Mages Ranch - Elbo Ranch property. The Highlands was placed on the National Register of Historic Places on August 19, 1998.

== See also ==
- Historical buildings and structures of Grand Teton National Park
