= Jenny Lake Ranger Station Historic District =

United States historic place in Grand Teton National Park

- U.S. National Register of Historic Places
- U.S. Historic district
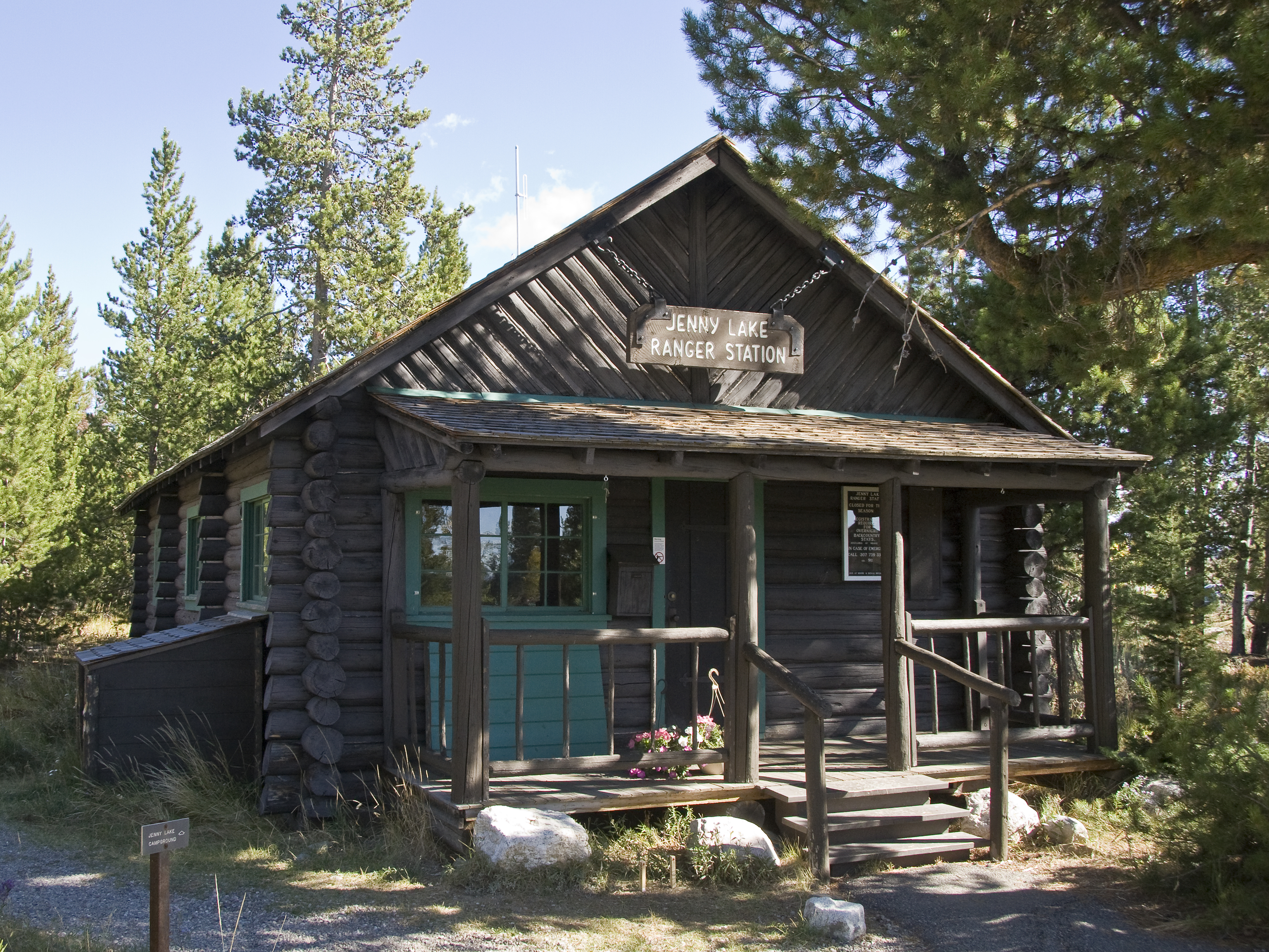

- Location within Wyoming Location within the United States
- Nearest city: Moose, Wyoming
- Coordinates: 43°45′13″N 110°43′19″W
- Architect: NPS Branch of Plans & Design
- MPS: Grand Teton National Park MPS
- NRHP reference No.: 90000610
- Added to NRHP: April 23, 1990

The Jenny Lake Ranger Station Historic District comprises an area that was the main point of visitor contact in Grand Teton National Park from the 1930s to 1960. Located near Jenny Lake, the buildings are a mixture of purpose-built structures and existing buildings that were adapted for use by the National Park Service. The ranger station was built as a cabin by Lee Mangus north of Moose, Wyoming about 1925 and was moved and rebuilt around 1930 for Park Service use. A store was built by a concessioner, and comfort stations were built to Park Service standard plans. All buildings were planned to the prevailing National Park Service Rustic style, although the ranger station and the photo shop were built from parts of buildings located elsewhere in the park.

== Ranger station ==
The ranger station was reconstructed from a cabin originally built by Lee Manges about 1925 which was acquired by the National Park Service in 1930 and moved to the present site. The small rectangular log cabin features a log pole front porch, with decorative half-log sheathing in a V-pattern on its gable.

== Crandall Studio ==
The Crandall Photo Studio was built just east of String Lake in 1925-26 and moved to the Jenny Lake site after Harrison Crandall's property was purchased by the Park Service in 1931. The studio operated at Jenny Lake until 1958, when the Grand Teton Lodge Company bought out Crandall's concession contract. Crandall, a Kansan, arrived in Jackson Hole in 1921. He returned the following year with his wife Hildegarde, and established a homestead claim in 1923 near the present Jenny Lake Lodge, where he built the cabin. Crandall sold scenic pictures of the Tetons as well as souvenir shots of dudes at the many dude ranches in Jackson Hole. Crandall also painted, his work appearing in magazines and collected by John D. Rockefeller Jr.

The studio-visitor center consists of two main rooms in a long, deep log structure, with a high open ceiling lighted by clerestory windows in roof monitors.

== Comfort stations ==
The comfort stations were built in 1934 and 1935 from Park Service standard plans by Civilian Conservation Corps labor, based at Jenny Lake CCC Camp NP-4.

== Present use ==
The district still serves as a point of visitor contact, but was superseded as the primary contact center with the construction of Mission 66 facilities at Moose, which themselves have recently been replaced by newer facilities. The Crandall Studio, formerly used is a book and gift store by the Grand Teton Association, as well as functioning as a small visitor center. The ranger station is no longer a primary visitor contact point, a function now fulfilled by the Crandall Studio, but the comfort stations remain in use. The ranger station is now used as a base for climbing rangers and to issue climbing permits. The district was placed on the National Register of Historic Places on April 23, 1990.

== See also ==
- Manges Cabin
- Historical buildings and structures of Grand Teton National Park
