= Moose Entrance Kiosk =

- U.S. National Register of Historic Places
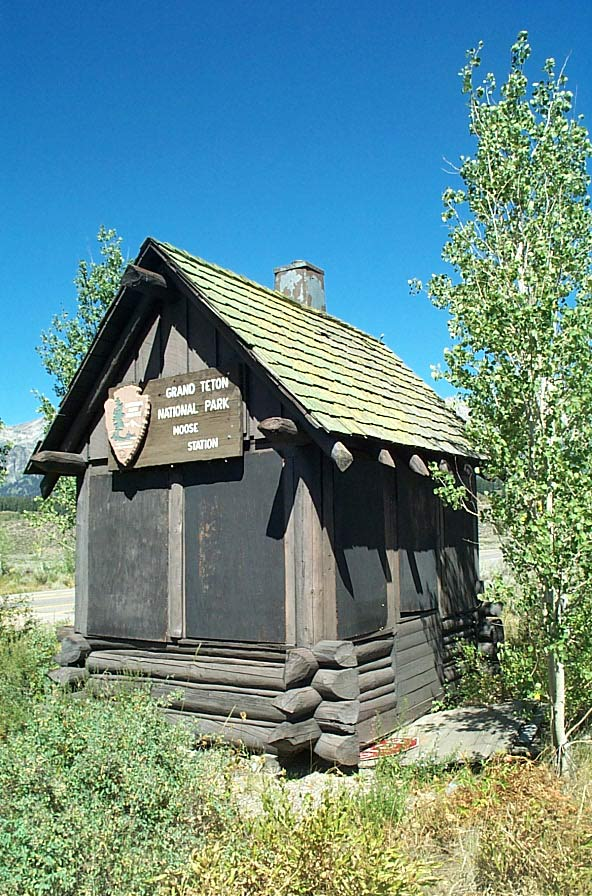

- Location within Wyoming Location within the United States
- Location: Moose, Wyoming
- Coordinates: 43°39′37.249″N 110°43′17.080″W
- Built: 1960
- Architect: NPS Branch of Plans & Design
- MPS: Grand Teton National Park MPS
- NRHP reference No.: 90000619
- Added to NRHP: April 23, 1990

The Moose Entrance Kiosk was built between 1934 and 1939 by either the Public Works Administration or the Civilian Conservation Corps at the entrance to Grand Teton National Park. The log kiosk was built to National Park Service standard plans in the National Park Service Rustic style. It was originally located near the park's former administrative area, but was moved in the early 1960s to the new administration center and entrance at Moose. It is the last survivor of that building type and era in the park.

The kiosk was designed in the National Park Service rustic style, using rough log construction throughout. It is no longer used, having been supplanted by two newer, somewhat larger structures.

The Moose Entrance Kiosk was listed on the National Register of Historic Places on April 23, 1990.

== See also ==
- Historical buildings and structures of Grand Teton National Park
