= Bar B C Dude Ranch =

- U.S. National Register of Historic Places
- U.S. Historic district
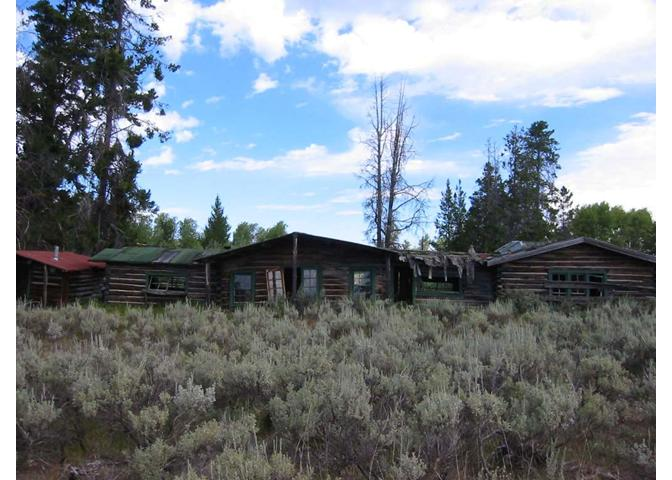

- Location within Wyoming Location within the United States
- Location: Grand Teton National Park, Jackson Hole, Teton County, Wyoming, USA
- Nearest city: Moose, Wyoming
- Coordinates: 43°41′42″N 110°41′42″W
- Architect: Struthers Burt, Horace Carncross
- MPS: Grand Teton National Park MPS
- NRHP reference No.: 90000624
- Added to NRHP: April 23, 1990

The Bar B C Dude Ranch was established near Moose, Wyoming in 1912 as a dude ranch by Struthers Burt and Dr. Horace Carncross, using their initials as the brand. Rather than converting a working ranch, Burt and Carncross built a tourist-oriented dude ranch from the ground up, using a style called "Dude Ranch Vernacular", which featured log construction and rustic detailing. As one of the first dude ranches in Jackson Hole, the Bar B C was a strong influence on other dude ranches in the area, and employed a number of people who went on to establish their own operations. It was acquired by the National Park Service and incorporated into Grand Teton National Park upon the expiration of a life estate. The ranch was listed on the National Register of Historic Places in 1990.

== History ==
Struthers Burt had previously started the first true dude ranch in Jackson Hole, the JY, in 1908 with Louis Joy. The JY's patrons included Owen Wister, whose writings did much to popularize dude ranches. However, Joy and Burt fell out. Established in 1912 by Burt and Horace Carncross, the B C was given a boost by the outbreak of World War I, which restricted American travel to Europe. Many Easterners came west, and Jackson Hole was particularly popular among Philadelphians. In 1917 Burt and Carncross borrowed $9200 to expand the ranch from the Philadelphia Trust Company. The standard of service and cuisine rose rapidly (Burt described early food as "bad"), moving from canned vegetables in the early years to fresh vegetables and dairy produced at the ranch by the early 1920s. By 1922 it was incorporated as Bar B C Ranches and was one of the largest operations in the valley, able to house fifty dudes in 45 buildings. Burt and Carncross also operated the White Grass for Harold Hammond and George Bispham during this time, briefly buying the White Grass operation before selling it back. New partners Irving Corse and Joe LePage joined the operation, having worked their way through the organization as cowboys, wranglers and foremen.

The B C site was carefully selected by Burt and Carncross after considering views, water, soil, timber, and a relative lack of mosquitoes. Carncross, a 41-year-old physician from Whitemarsh, Pennsylvania, hoped that the dude ranch business would lead to a cattle ranching operation. Rather than buying an existing operation, Burt and Carncross established the B C as a homestead claim on adjacent tracts of 154.03 acres (62.33 ha) for Burt and 158.03 acres (63.95 ha) for Carncross, claiming more land in subsequent years. By 1917 the B C amounted to more than 600 acres (240 ha). In 1924 Burt and Carncross bought a ranch near the Gros Ventre River to raise cattle and hay, naming it the Lower Bar BC.

In 1924, Burt published Diary of a Dude Wrangler in the Saturday Evening Post. Burt was himself a Princeton-educated Easterner who wrote on a wide range of subjects, including the West. Burt's wife, Katharine Newlin Burt (1882–1977) and son Nathaniel Burt (1913–2003) were also published writers. Consequently, the Bar B C tended to attract writers. Guests included Harry W. Frantz and Burt's friends from Princeton, including David Adler.

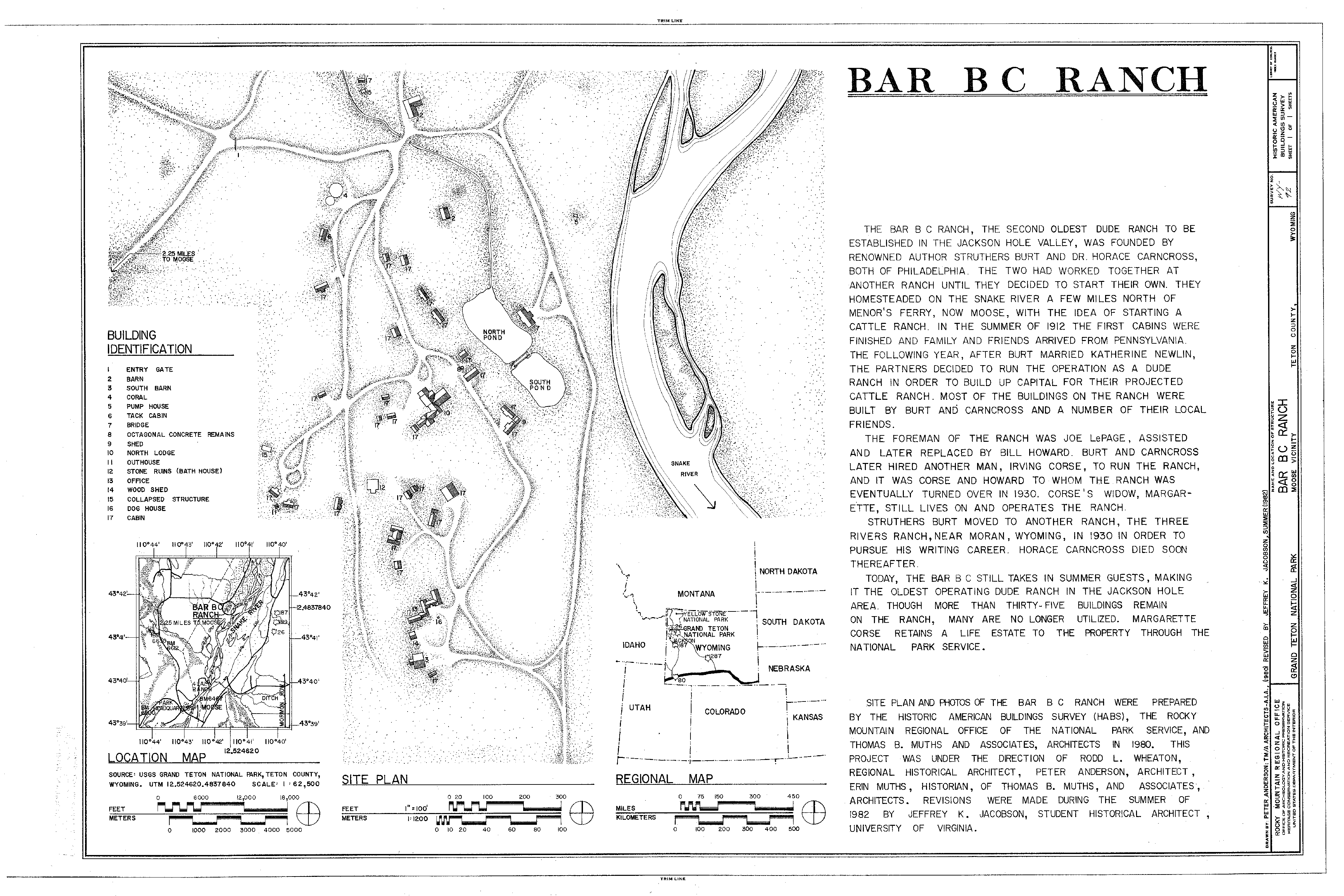
HABS plan of the Bar BC in 1982

During the 1920s Burt became an active advocate for conservation in Jackson Hole, opposing plans to build a dam at the outlet of Jenny Lake. In 1923 Burt participated in a meeting with Horace Albright, director of the National Park Service, at Maud Noble's cabin at Menor's Ferry, which established a plan for the protection of Jackson Hole. After 1927 the Snake River Land Company, operating on behalf of John D. Rockefeller Jr., began to buy Jackson Hole land for eventual transfer to the National Park Service. In 1929 Burt and his then-partner Irving Corse sold the Bar B C in return for a life estate that allowed the dude operation to continue. Carncross had died in 1928 at his home in Pennsylvania, soon followed by Joe LePage. Grand Teton National Park was established in 1929, encompassing the Teton Range. It would not be until 1943, when Franklin D. Roosevelt proclaimed Jackson Hole National Monument, assembled largely from Snake River Land Company holdings, that the ranch would exist within the protected lands. In 1929, Burt bought land along Pacific Creek where he established a dude ranch-like private retreat, naming it Three Rivers Ranch.

During the 1930s Burt and Corse disagreed over management and profit sharing, and in 1937 Corse bought out Burt. Corse believed that authenticity demanded that the ranch look "run down", and neglected maintenance. A series of fires caused some necessary rebuilding, and in 1934 Corse moved Joe LePage's cabin to the ranch. Corse also built a small airstrip and hangar on the property. During World War II Corse suspended the ranch operation to be a flight instructor at the University of Wyoming. After the war, Corse's health declined, and he died in 1953. Margaretta Corse subleased the ranch to T.H. and Margaretta Frew Conderman (of the 4 Lazy F Dude Ranch Frews), who operated the ranch as short-term-stay tourist cabins from 1950 to 1959. Afterwards, Mrs. Corse managed the ranch until 1985, when she could no longer continue. Mrs. Corse died in 1988. The life estate was terminated, and the property reverted to the Park Service.

== Description ==
The historic district at the Bar B C includes 37 structures, including cabins, a lodge, a dining hall, a laundry/utility building, man-made ponds, barns, sheds and corrals. The site is at the western edge of the Snake River bottomlands, nestled against a river terrace to the west. A central road climbs from the ranch through a cutting in the hillside. The buildings are chiefly 1- or 1 1/2-story log structures, rectangular in shape. Roofing is red or green asphalt roll roofing. The property layout is apparently casual, but centers on the dining hall and lodge, with cabins on either side of the main path, flanked by corrals to the north and the barn to the south. While the exteriors are in good condition and are considered contributing features, the interiors have lost much of their character through alterations and loss of fixtures.

The informally styled ranch was widely copied by later dude ranches, and is considered a prototype of the genre.

== Offspring ==
As one of the first dude ranches in the area, the B C inspired former dudes and employees to establish their own operations. Bar B C alumni established the White Grass, Sun Star, and the STS Ranch. Others, such as Maud Noble, who bought Menor's Ferry, or Cissy Patterson, established personal retreats.

The ranch operated until after World War II, when the cabins became summer rental cabins.

== Present situation ==
The main ranch is included in Grand Teton National Park. The buildings have received limited maintenance since 1986. Many structures have deteriorated, and some have been partially demolished, but preservation work, coordinated from the National Trust for Historic Preservation Western Center at the White Grass Ranch, has stabilized the Carncross Cabin and the main lodge. The Bar B C was placed on the National Register of Historic Places on April 23, 1990. The 2016 National Park Service historic properties management report for Grand Teton National Park recommended that 24 of the 34 buildings on the site be stabilized in-kind, three more extensively repaired, and seven salvaged for materials or allowed to deteriorate. The property would be managed as a day-use area where techniques of architectural preservation could be taught and practiced.

A residential property development on the former Lower B C Ranch property, just south of the Three Rivers Ranch, is now called the Bar BC Ranch.

== See also ==
- Snake River Ranch, a family retreat and working ranch directly across the Snake River
- Historical buildings and structures of Grand Teton National Park
