= Manges Cabin =

Historic house in Wyoming, United States

- U.S. National Register of Historic Places
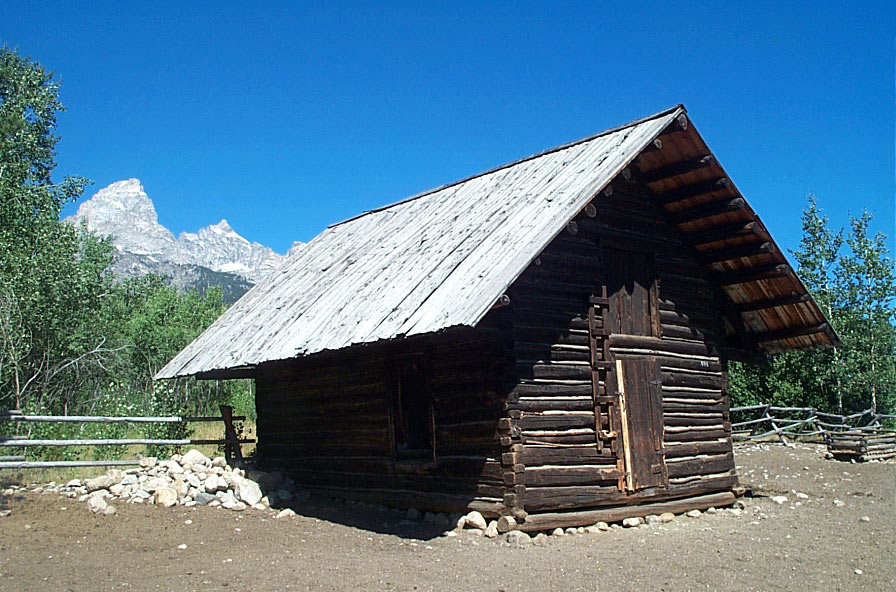

- Location within Wyoming Location within the United States
- Nearest city: Moose, Wyoming
- Coordinates: 43°41′54″N 110°43′59″W
- Architect: James Manges
- MPS: Grand Teton National Park MPS
- NRHP reference No.: 98001035
- Added to NRHP: August 19, 1998

The Manges Cabin in Grand Teton National Park, also known as the Old Elbo Ranch Homestead Cabin, Mangus Cabin and the Taggart Creek Barn, was built in 1911 by James Manges. Manges was the second settler on the west side of the Snake River after Bill Menor, setting up a homestead near Taggart Creek. James Manges (or Mangus) arrived in Jackson Hole in 1910, where he cut wood for Charles or William Wort. Manges' cabin is stated to have been the first two-story structure in the northern part of the valley. A root cellar was excavated beneath. The log and frame structure features wide eaves to keep the winter snow away from the walls. It was heated in winter by a single stove, with one room on each level.

The cabin became part of Manges's ranch, which took on the character of a dude ranch with guest cabins. In 1926 Manges sold 40 acres (16 ha) of the ranch to neighbor Frank Williams, who expanded the Double Diamond Dude Ranch with partner Joseph Clark Jr.

== Elbo Ranch ==
In 1926 Californian Chester Goss bought the property, as well as the neighboring Frank and Albert Bessette ranches. Goss, amassing a total of 423 acres (171 ha), expanded the accommodations and built a rodeo ground, racetrack, baseball field and store and renaming the property the Elbo Ranch. The Elbo's advertising called it "The Home of the Hollywood Cowboy." The Snake River Land Company bought the Elbo ranch in 1929 as part of its work to assemble lands in Jackson Hole for preservation in an expanded national park. The SRLC allowed the National Park Service to use some Elbo Ranch cabins for employee housing. Harry Epenscheid operated the ranch in 1942, and Katie Starratt leased the Elbo from the late 1940s until 1958, when her operation and the Elbo name moved to the Ramshorn.

The ranch was acquired by the Park Service in 1956 and was used as employee housing. By 1973 the Park Service had removed most of the structures and was using the cabin as a barn. The Manges Cabin was listed on the National Register of Historic Places in 1998.

== See also ==
- Ramshorn Dude Ranch Lodge (second Elbo Ranch)
- Historical buildings and structures of Grand Teton National Park
