= White Grass Ranger Station Historic District =

Historic district in Wyoming, United States

- U.S. National Register of Historic Places
- U.S. Historic district
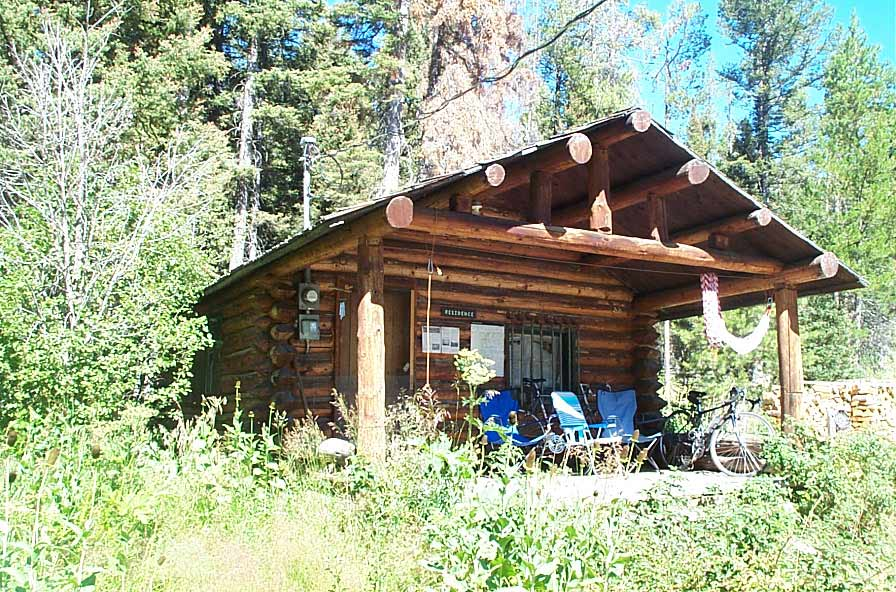

- Location within Wyoming Location within the United States
- Nearest city: Moose, Wyoming
- Coordinates: 43°39′20″N 110°46′48″W
- Architect: NPS Branch of Plans & Design
- MPS: Grand Teton National Park MPS
- NRHP reference No.: 90000614
- Added to NRHP: April 23, 1990

The White Grass Ranger Station includes several structures in the backcountry of Grand Teton National Park that were established to support horse patrols by park rangers. Built in 1930, White Grass is the only surviving horse patrol station in the park. The station, which includes a cabin, several sheds and a corral, was built to a standardized National Park Service plan, in the National Park Service rustic style.

The White Grass station was built immediately after the establishment of Grand Teton National Park in 1929, and was one of the first structures built by the National Park Service to establish a park service presence in the area. Other patrol cabins existed in the park, but these were inherited from the U.S. Forest Service, which administered Teton National Forest, from which the park was created. The ranger station's exterior remains essentially the same as the original construction, but the interior has been altered several times and does not retain historical significance.

The White Grass station stands at the western edge of the White Grass district of Grand Teton, southwest of Moose, Wyoming. The station is sited in a small clearing in the trees, with a buffer of vegetation between it and a nearby parking lot.

The White Grass Ranger Station was placed on the National Register of Historic Places on April 23, 1990.

== See also ==
- Historical buildings and structures of Grand Teton National Park
