= Gap Puche Cabin =

Historic house in Wyoming, United States

- U.S. National Register of Historic Places
- Location within Wyoming Location within the United States
- Nearest city: Jackson, Wyoming
- Coordinates: 43°36′32″N 110°27′15″W
- Built: 1930
- Architect: Actor Nelson, Charlie Smith
- NRHP reference No.: 90000889
- Added to NRHP: June 18, 1990

The Gap Puche Cabin is a log cabin near Jackson, Wyoming that is the last survivor of the early outfitting industry in Jackson Hole. It was built c. 1929 at the junction of the Gros Ventre River and Crystal Creek by brothers-in-law Actor Nelson and Charlie Smith. Beginning in 1930 the property was used by John Wort and Steve Callaghan as a base camp for their hunting guide, or outfitting operation, and became known as "Wort's Hunting Camp". Callaghan's interest in the operation was bought by Billy Stilson around 1935, and bought out Wort by 1939. The cabin was moved in 1942 or 1943 to its present location.

In 1976 Stilson sold the outfitting business to Gap and Peg Puche, who continue to use the cabin as a base camp.

== See also ==
- Wort Hotel
