= Kimmel Kabins =

- U.S. National Register of Historic Places
- U.S. Historic district
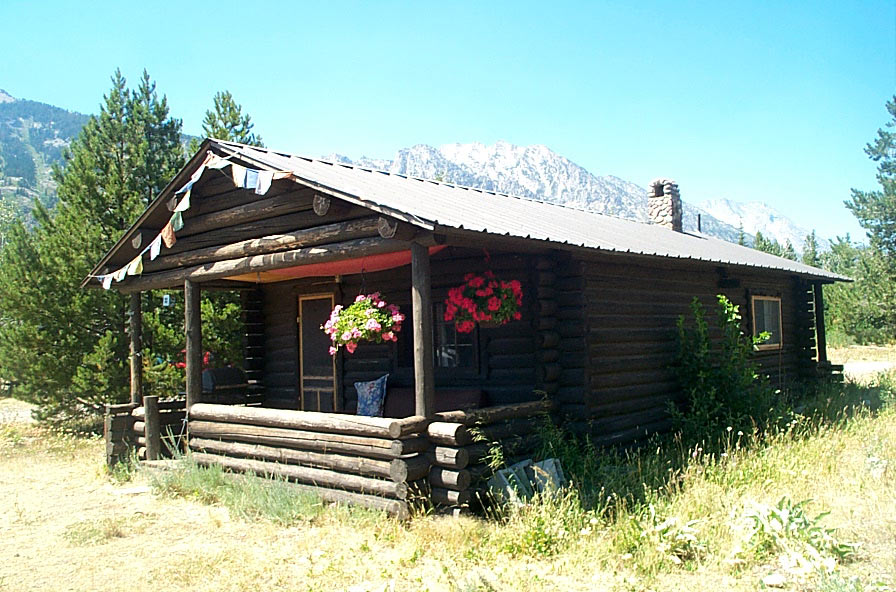

- Location within Wyoming Location within the United States
- Nearest city: Moose, Wyoming
- Coordinates: 43°44′38″N 110°43′38″W
- Architect: J.D. Kimmel, Lura Kimmel
- MPS: Grand Teton National Park MPS
- NRHP reference No.: 90000612
- Added to NRHP: April 23, 1990

The Kimmel Kabins were a tourist camp in Grand Teton National Park. The camp was built in 1937 by J.D. and Lura Kimmel with a rustic lodge and eleven cabins on either side of Cottonwood Creek south of Jenny Lake. The camp is the only remaining example of a motor court-style camp in Grand Teton out of as many as twelve former establishments. The camp eventually featured a store with a post office.

The Kimmels sold the strategically located property in 1944 in exchange for a life estate. After Lura Kimmel's death in 1962 the cabins were used as seasonal residences for National Park Service employees and the other buildings were removed.

The Kimmel Kabins were placed on the National Register of Historic Places on April 23, 1990.

== See also ==
- Historical buildings and structures of Grand Teton National Park
