= Triangle X Barn =

- U.S. National Register of Historic Places
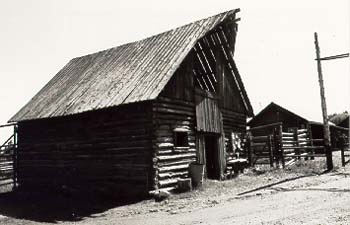

- Location within Wyoming Location within the United States
- Location: Grand Teton National Park, Teton County, Wyoming, USA
- Nearest city: Moose, Wyoming
- Coordinates: 43°45′53″N 110°34′1″W
- Architect: John Fee
- MPS: Grand Teton National Park MPS
- NRHP reference No.: 98001042
- Added to NRHP: August 19, 1998

The Triangle X Barn is a log barn at the Triangle X dude ranch in Grand Teton National Park. The barn was built by J.C. Turner, who used logs from neighbor John Fee's partly completed log cabin to begin construction of his barn in 1928. The barn, which is still in use, displays several methods of notching logs. It is notable as an illustration of the extent of the re-use of building materials that was common practice on what was in the early 20th century still almost a frontier settlement.

The Triangle X is the only dude ranch still operating within the boundaries of Grand Teton National Park. The first ten log courses use dovetailed logs from Fee's unfinished cabin. The upper six courses comprising the loft base are square-notched. The gable ends are sheathed in random-width planks varying from 6 inches (15 cm) to 12 inches (30 cm). The roof extends as a hood over the south end of the barn. The interior features a center aisle with two stalls on one side and a tack room on the other. There is no interior access to the loft.

The Triangle X Barn was placed on the National Register of Historic Places on August 19, 1998

== See also ==
- Historical buildings and structures of Grand Teton National Park
