= Cunningham Cabin =

Historic house in Wyoming, United States

- U.S. National Register of Historic Places
- U.S. Historic district
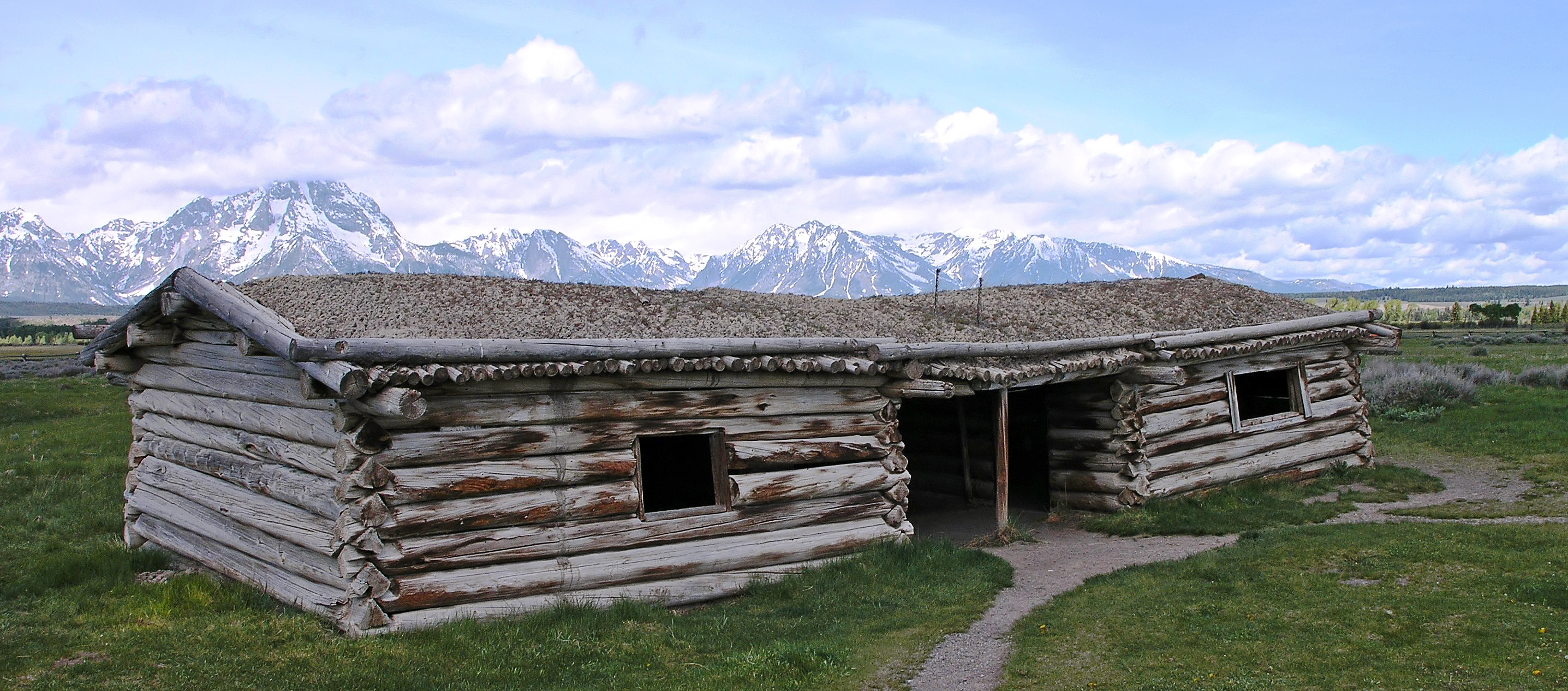

- Location within Wyoming Location within the United States
- Nearest city: Moose, Wyoming
- Coordinates: 43°46′44″N 110°33′28″W
- Built: 1885
- MPS: Grand Teton National Park MPS
- NRHP reference No.: 73000225
- Added to NRHP: October 2, 1973

The Cunningham Cabin is a double-pen log cabin in Grand Teton National Park in the US state of Wyoming. It was built as a homestead in Jackson Hole and represents an adaptation of an Appalachian building form to the West. The cabin was built just south of Spread Creek by John Pierce Cunningham, who arrived in Jackson Hole in 1885 and subsisted as a trapper until he established the Bar Flying U Ranch in 1888. The Cunninghams left the valley for Idaho in 1928, when land was being acquired for the future Grand Teton National Park.

Cunningham and his wife grew about 100 acres (40 ha) of hay, later irrigating another 140 acres (57 ha) to provide feed for 100 cattle and eight horses. His brother, W. Pierce Cunningham, settled his family nearby. By 1924 the Cunningham ranch comprised 560 acres (230 ha). By 1926 Cunningham had moved out of cattle and was raising sheep on the land.

J. Pierce Cunningham was one of the original county commissioners chosen when Teton County was organized in 1923. He was also, at various times, a justice of the peace, postmaster and game warden.

After 1895 the Cunninghams, who had built a more commodious house, used the cabin as a barn or a smithy. A small fortification was erected in 1895 during unrest involving the Bannack Indians. Traces of foundations survive.

== Gunfight at the Bar Flying U Ranch ==
Two Montana wranglers approached Cunningham in the fall of 1892 to purchase hay. Cunningham allowed the strangers to winter on his ranch. Rumors spread that the men were horse thieves. Next spring, a man claiming to be a U.S. Marshal, with three deputies, rode into Jackson from Idaho. Joined by Jackson recruits, the marshal's men surrounded the ranch at night. In the morning, the posse gunned down the alleged thieves. The men's guilt, the allegations, and the marshal's identity were never confirmed.

== Description ==
The cabin is a sod-roofed double-pen or dog-trot style building with a room on either side of the central breezeway or "dog-trot." The form is Appalachian in origin. No nails or metal fastenings were used in the cabin's construction. The cabin was reconstructed in 1956, resetting the wall logs after replacing the sill logs and rebuilding the roof. The logs are saddle-V-notched at the corners. The site comprises 10 acres (4.0 ha), including the cabin, 1890 house site, fort site, barn site, bunkhouse and outbuildings sites, as well as pits that may have been wells or privies. The cabin measures about 41.5 feet (12.6 m) by 15.25 feet (4.65 m). Two rooms both open into the breezeway, each room with two windows facing northeast and southwest. The south room was the living quarters, the north was used as a forge.

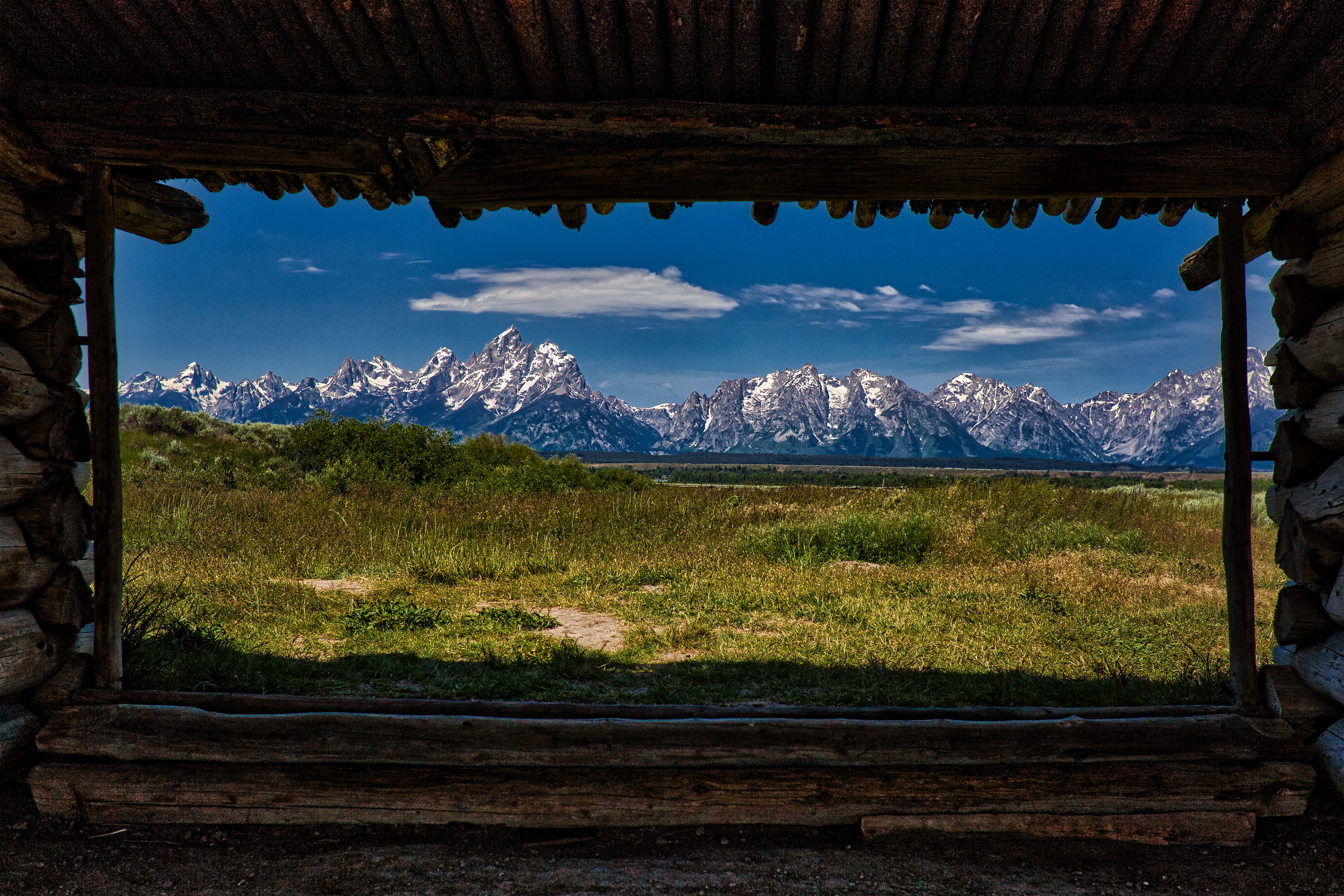
View through the cabin

== See also ==
- Historical buildings and structures of Grand Teton National Park
