= Leek's Lodge =

Historic house in Wyoming, United States

- Formerly listed on the U.S. National Register of Historic Places
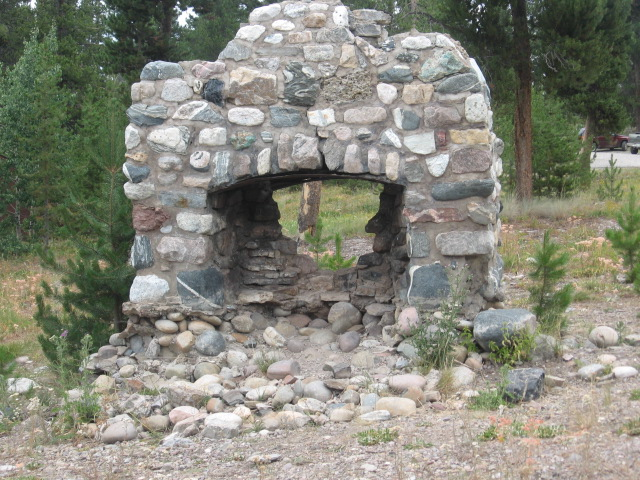
- The surviving chimney of the main lodge

- Location within Wyoming Location within the United States
- Nearest city: Moran, Wyoming
- Coordinates: 43°55′49″N 110°38′21″W
- Built: 1926
- Architect: Leek, Steven N.
- NRHP reference No.: 75000216

Significant dates
- Added to NRHP: September 05, 1975
- Removed from NRHP: April 15, 2014

Leek's Lodge is part of a former resort and dude ranch in Grand Teton National Park, near Jackson Lake. The ranch was established to offer activities to boys in a frontier setting. Its founder, Steven N. Leek, was instrumental in the establishment of the National Elk Refuge in Jackson Hole. The rustic lodge was built in 1927.

The camp operated as a park concessioner after the establishment of Jackson Hole National Monument in 1943. In 1977 the camp was operated as part of Signal Mountain Lodge and most remaining buildings were removed. A 1998 fire destroyed the main lodge, leaving only the chimney standing. The Park Service-operated Leek's Marina is located at the site.

Leek's Lodge was listed on the National Register of Historic Places on September 5, 1975. It was removed from the National Register on April 15, 2014.

== See also ==
- Historical buildings and structures of Grand Teton National Park
