= AMK Ranch =

- U.S. National Register of Historic Places
- U.S. Historic district
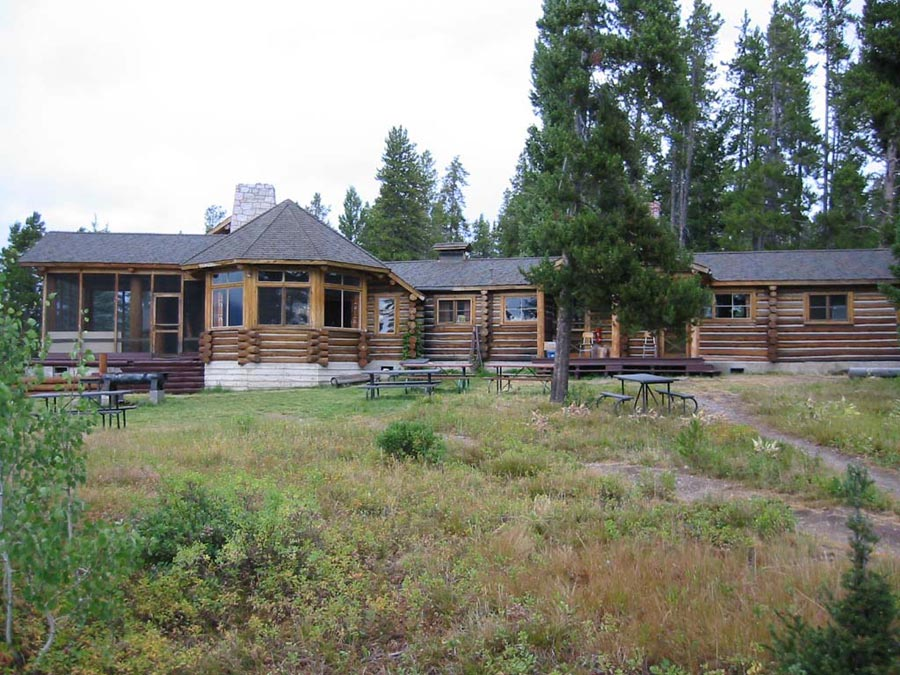

- Location within Wyoming Location within the United States
- Location: Grand Teton National Park, Jackson Hole, Teton County, Wyoming, USA
- Nearest city: Moran, Wyoming
- Coordinates: 43°56′20″N 110°38′30″W
- Architect: George W. Kosmak
- MPS: Grand Teton National Park MPS
- NRHP reference No.: 90000615
- Added to NRHP: April 23, 1990

The AMK Ranch is a former personal retreat on the eastern shore of Jackson Lake in Grand Teton National Park. Also known as the Merymare, Lonetree and Mae-Lou Ranch, it was a former homestead, expanded beginning in the 1920s by William Louis Johnson, then further developed in the 1930s by Alfred Berol (Berolzheimer). Johnson built a lodge, barn and boathouse in 1927, while Berol added a larger lodge, new boathouse, and cabins, all in the rustic style.

After acquisition by the National Park Service, it was designated the University of Wyoming - National Park Research Station The research center is cooperatively owned by the National Park Service and the university, directed by University of Wyoming zoology professor William W. Fetzer.

== Description ==
Located on the shore of Jackson Lake north of Colter Bay Village, the ranch is notable for its high level of craftsmanship and attention to detail, comparable to that seen in contemporary National Park Service structures. The Berol Lodge is the most extensively detailed rustic structure in Grand Teton. Of the 17-building complex, 14 are considered contributing structures to the historic district.

The Merymere Lodge was one of the first structures on the property. The principal buildings are the Johnson Lodge, built by William Johnson, and the Berol Lodge, built by Alfred Berol.

== History ==
The original property was established in 1890 as a homestead rather than as a working ranch, the farthest north in Jackson Hole, by John Dudley Sargent and Robert Ray Hamilton. Sargent and Hamilton. Both men had been sent west by their families to put them at arms length, as remittance men. Sargent may have murdered Hamilton on Signal Mountain, which gained its name from the signal fire lit by searchers for Hamilton when they found his body. William Johnson was an executive of The Hoover Company, who acquired the Sargent Ranch in 1926, building a small lodge, garage and boathouse in 1927 using the log construction prevailing for dude ranches in Jackson Hole. Johnson died in 1931, and Berolzheimer, an officer of the Eagle (later Berol) Company, manufacturers of pencils, bought the ranch in 1936. Berol hired New York architect George W. Kosmak to design a new main lodge, boathouse, and cabins. Kosmak was assisted by Jackson architect Paul T. Colbron. In 1953 the ranch became a field research station, operated by the University of Wyoming.

The AMK was listed on the National Register of Historic Places on April 23, 1990.

== See also ==
- Historical buildings and structures of Grand Teton National Park
