= The Brinkerhoff =

- U.S. National Register of Historic Places
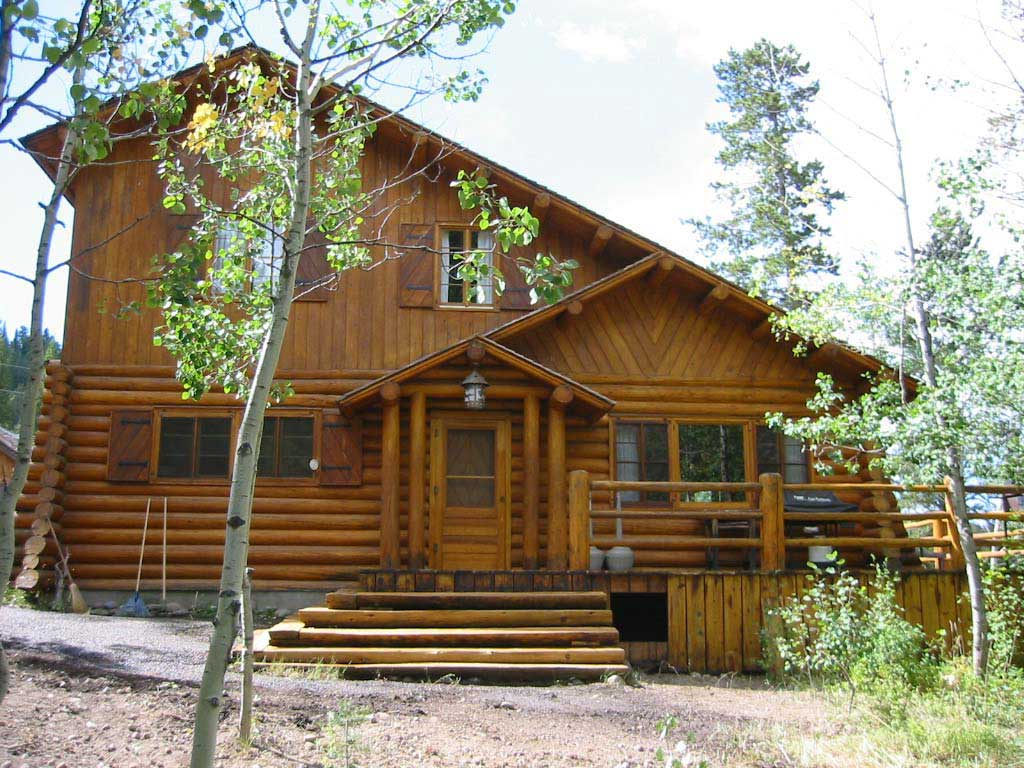

- Location within Wyoming Location within the United States
- Nearest city: Moose, Wyoming
- Coordinates: 43°51′3″N 110°35′35″W
- Architect: Jan Wilding
- MPS: Grand Teton National Park MPS
- NRHP reference No.: 90000622
- Added to NRHP: April 23, 1990

The Brinkerhoff is a historic lodge in Grand Teton National Park on the shore of Jackson Lake. It is the last remaining example of a forest lease vacation lodge in the park. The log house and caretaker's lodge were designed by architect Jan Wilding of Casper, Wyoming and were built in 1946 in what was then U.S. Forest Service land for the Brinkerhoff family. After the creation of Grand Teton National Park, the National Park Service acquired the property and used it for VIP housing. Among the guests at the Brinkerhoff were John F. Kennedy and Richard M. Nixon. The lodge is also notable as a post-war adaptation of the rustic style of architecture. The interior is an intact example of this transitional style.

== History ==
In the early days of Grand Teton National Park there were 111 forest leases, a legacy of U.S. Forest Service administration of lands that were incorporated into the new park. Ben Sheffield received a Forest Service lease for a parcel on Jackson Lake in 1930. The Sheffield house burned in the 1940s and the lease was purchased in 1947 from R. E. McConaughy by Zachery K. Brinkerhoff Sr. and his son. The Brinkerhoffs were the owners of an oil development company, the Brinkerhoff Drilling company. They hired Wilding to design their retreat, which was built by Scotty Sloten and four carpenters of Swedish descent from the Wind River valley, experienced in log construction. The house was furnished with furniture and accessories made by Western-style designer Thomas C. Molesworth. The house was sold to the Park Service in 1955, complete with the Molesworth furnishings. It received significant publicity as a result of the presidential visits. The National Park Service uses it for meetings and lodging.

== Description ==
The Brinkerhoff is an early example of the conscious adaptation of rustic-style architecture that had been employed in public buildings around Jackson Hole to a private vacation house, in which the rustic style sets the tone of a rustic retreat. Jan Wilding's interpretation of the rustic style represents a transition from the heavy, consciously rustic style seen in public park buildings, to a cleaned-up, more finished and polished style, which would be further developed in vacation homes throughout the West. The main house is a partial two-story log building of dressed log construction, with vertical wood sheathing on the upper story. The front gable is sheathed in planks arranged in a V-pattern. A deck spans the full width of the west side of the house, overlooking Mount Moran and Jackson Lake, an early occurrence of a feature that has since become ubiquitous. The interior features a two-story living room. Interiors are finished with knotty pine paneling and polished wood floors. A smaller caretaker's cottage mirrors the style of the main house.

The Brinkerhoff was placed on the National Register of Historic Places on April 23, 1990.

== See also ==
- Historical buildings and structures of Grand Teton National Park
