= String Lake Comfort Station =

- U.S. National Register of Historic Places
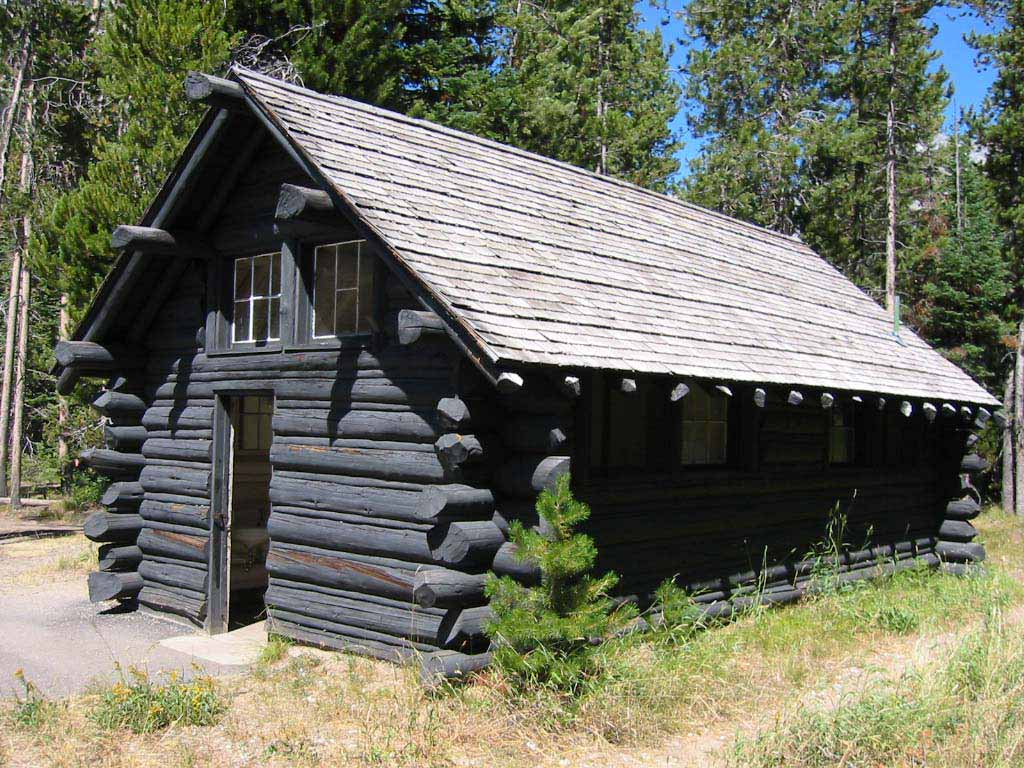

- Location within Wyoming Location within the United States
- Nearest city: Moose, Wyoming
- Coordinates: 43°47′19″N 110°43′47″W
- Architect: NPS Branch of Plans & Design
- MPS: Grand Teton National Park MPS
- NRHP reference No.: 90000617
- Added to NRHP: April 23, 1990

The String Lake Comfort Station is one of three similar buildings in Grand Teton National Park that were built by the Civilian Conservation Corps and the Public Works Administration to standard National Park Service plans. Built between 1934 and 1939, the String Lake station was originally located near the Jenny Lake ranger station. It is an example of the National Park Service Rustic style.

The String Lake Comfort Station was listed on the National Register of Historic Places on April 23, 1990.
