= Wort Hotel =

- U.S. National Register of Historic Places
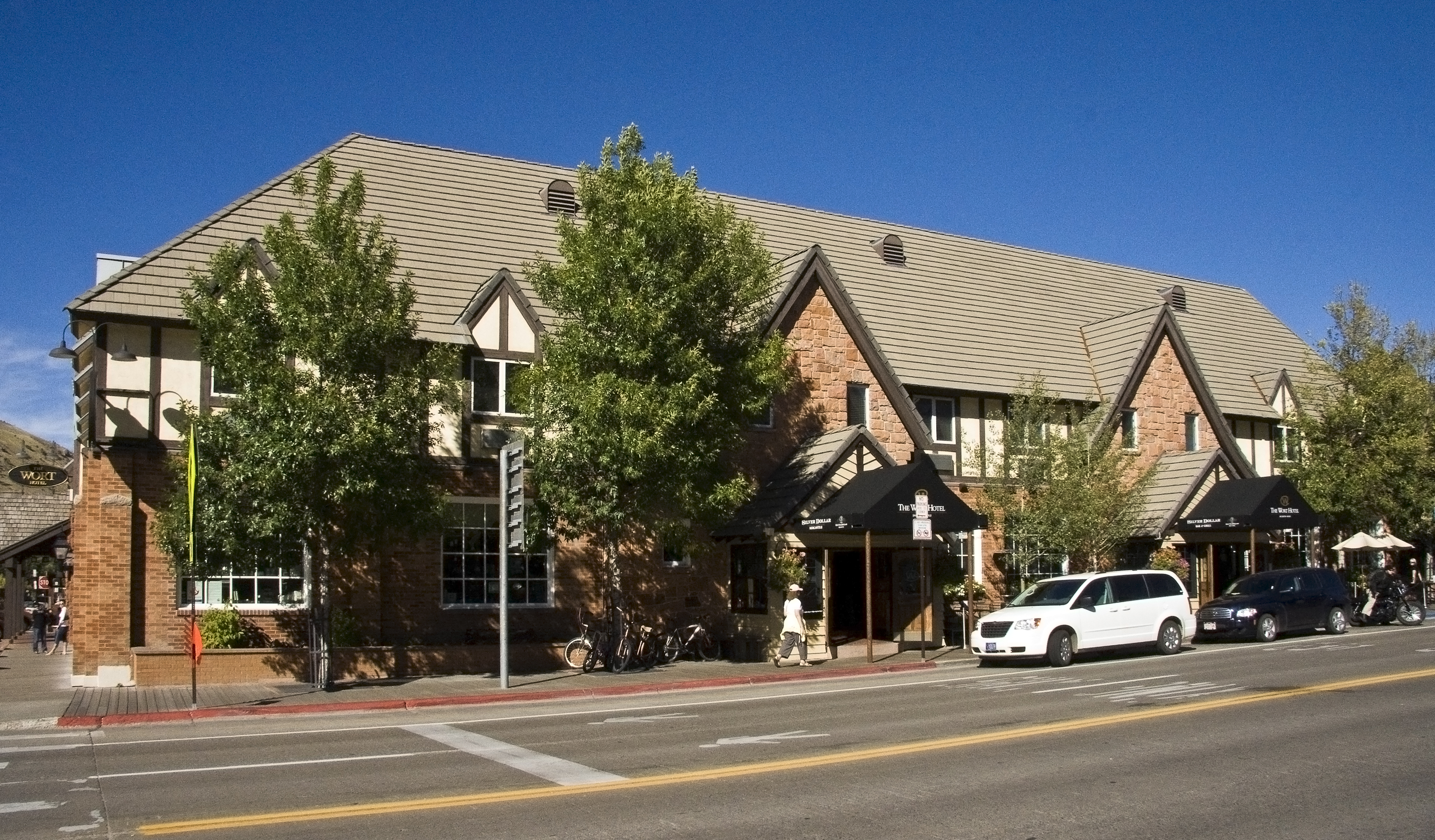

- Location within Wyoming Location within the United States
- Location: Jackson, Wyoming; United States
- Coordinates: 43°28′48″N 110°45′45″W
- Built: 1941
- Architect: Grimmett, Lorenzo
- Architectural style: Tudor Revival
- NRHP reference No.: 99001507
- Added to NRHP: December 09, 1999

The Wort Hotel was built in downtown Jackson, Wyoming, United States by brothers John and Jess Wort, who were significant figures in the transformation of the economy of Jackson Hole from ranching to tourism. The somewhat Tudor-style building was the first luxury hotel in Jackson. The two-story building features brick facing, with half-timbering and stucco on the second floor and a series of gables facing the street.

The hotel was built on property that had been bought by Charles Wort, father of John and Jess, who operated a livery stable on the site from 1915 to 1932. From 1932 to 1940 the Wort Family operated what is now Signal Mountain Lodge in Grand Teton National Park, until the Wort Hotel was opened in 1941. In 1950 the Silver Dollar Bar was added, with 2032 uncirculated silver dollars embedded in the surface of the bar.

== Wort Family ==
Charles J. Wort first arrived in Jackson Hole in 1893 at age 19 to visit his brother Hamilton and half brother Stephen Leek. Charles remained to homestead in the South Park region of Teton County. After a trip to his native Nebraska to marry his wife Luella Perkins in 1899 he returned with Luella. In the early 1900s he began to work as an outfitter, assisted by his sons John and Jess. The Worts began to assemble land in the center of Jackson in 1915 with the aim of eventually building a hotel. In the meantime Charles built the Wort Livery Stable and Corral on the property, operating until 1932, along with the Wort Garage at Broadway and Cache. In 1917 Charles and Luella bought the Jackson Hotel at North Cache and Deloney, operating it for slightly more than a year. In 1925 they built a house across from the future hotel on West Broadway, ending their career as ranchers. The house was moved to Wilson, Wyoming in the 1960s. They had previously built a log cabin at Broadway and Cache for their sons to stay in when inclement weather prevented them from returning home from school in Jackson. Known as the Wort boys' cabin, it was later used as a law office by Will Simpson. Moved into Town Square, it is still used by a stagecoach ride concession in the summers. During the 1920s the Worts obtained the first concession in Grand Teton National Park at Jenny Lake, where they ran a boating concession. In the 1930s the Worts operated their hunting concession in the Gros Ventre Mountains at what is now the Gap Puche Cabin. In 1932 the Worts purchased the Ole Warner Camp on Jackson Lake, naming it the Wort Lodge and Camp and operating it until 1940 when it was sold as the Signal Mountain Lodge. The proceeds from the sale financed the construction of the Wort Hotel, undertaken by John and Jess, Charles having died in 1933.

== History ==
The Wort Hotel was designed by self-taught architect Lorenzo "Ren" Grimmett of Idaho Falls, Idaho. After observing the success of the Wort, Grimmett subsequently designed a near twin of the Wort, the Stage Coach Inn, in West Yellowstone, Montana, which he owned and operated himself. The Wort was finished just before the outbreak of World War II. Despite wartime restrictions, the hotel became popular with servicemen on furlough. Gambling was officially illegal, but tolerated until the 1950s, when Wyoming Governor Milward Simpson began a campaign against gambling. At the Wort, gambling retreated to the basement Teton Room, locally known as the "Snake Pit." Gambling finally ceased in the mid 1950s.

A fire in 1980 severely damaged the hotel, destroying much of the second floor, but it was reopened in 1981 with some changes. In 1984 the hotel was sold out of the Wort family. The hotel was placed on the National Register of Historic Places in 1999. It was also inducted into Historic Hotels of America, the official program of the National Trust for Historic Preservation, in 2002.

Meet me at the Wort, which is released on 2006 by Charles Craighead with photography by David J. Swift, is a detailed history of the hotel.

== See also ==
- List of Historic Hotels of America
- Gap Puche Cabin
