= Old Administrative Area Historic District =

Historic district in Wyoming, United States

- Administrative Area Historic District, Old
- U.S. National Register of Historic Places
- U.S. Historic district
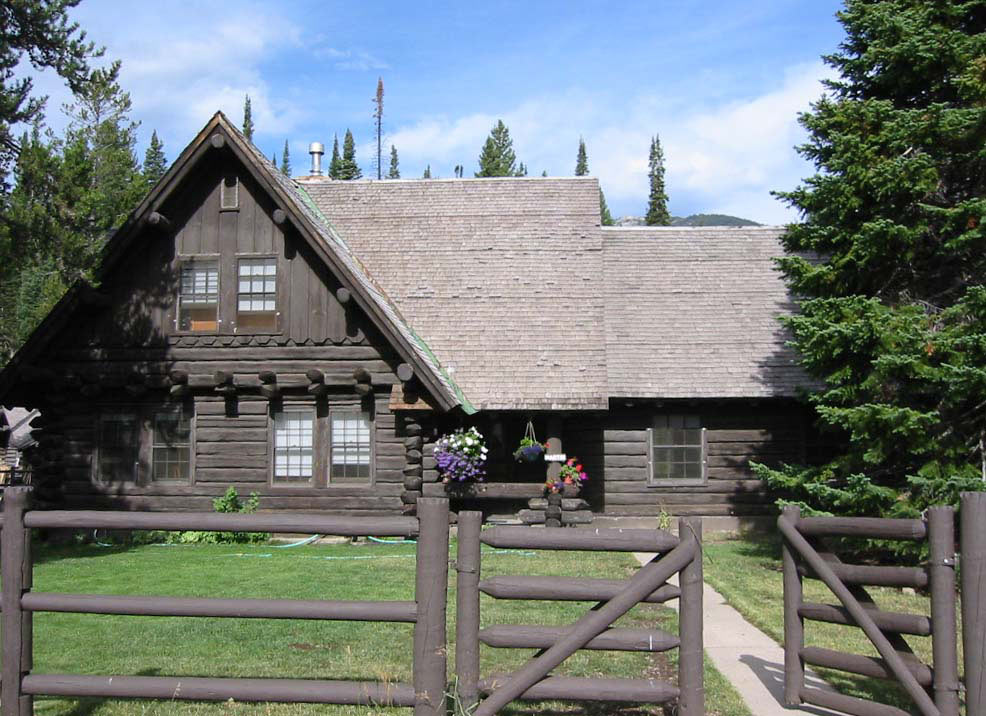
- Superintendent's Residence

- Location within Wyoming Location within the United States
- Nearest city: Moose, Wyoming
- Coordinates: 43°41′10″N 110°44′8″W
- Architect: NPS Branch of Plans & Design, Keith Matson
- MPS: Grand Teton National Park MPS
- NRHP reference No.: 90000621
- Added to NRHP: April 23, 1990

The Old Administrative Area Historic District, also known as Beaver Creek, is the former headquarters area of Grand Teton National Park. The complex of five houses, three warehouses and an administrative building were designed in the National Park Service rustic style between 1934 and 1939 and were built by the Civilian Conservation Corps and the Public Works Administration. As part of the Mission 66 program, the park headquarters were relocated to Moose, Wyoming in the 1960s.

Beaver Creek Building #10 was the park's first headquarters building. It had been built before 1908 as the Stewart Ranger Station when the area was under U.S. Forest Service management.

The site was planned by Keith Matson of the National Park Service. The houses are oriented so that they enjoy a view of Grand Teton from their front porches. The interiors of the buildings have been substantially remodeled over time to accommodate changing tastes, expectations and functions and are not considered historically significant, while the exteriors remain well preserved and substantially unaltered.

The buildings include the park superintendent's house, five houses with garages, the old park administration building, and three warehouses.

The Beaver Creek district was placed on the National Register of Historic Places on April 23, 1990.

== See also ==
- Historical buildings and structures of Grand Teton National Park
