= Menor's Ferry =

- U.S. National Register of Historic Places
- U.S. Historic district
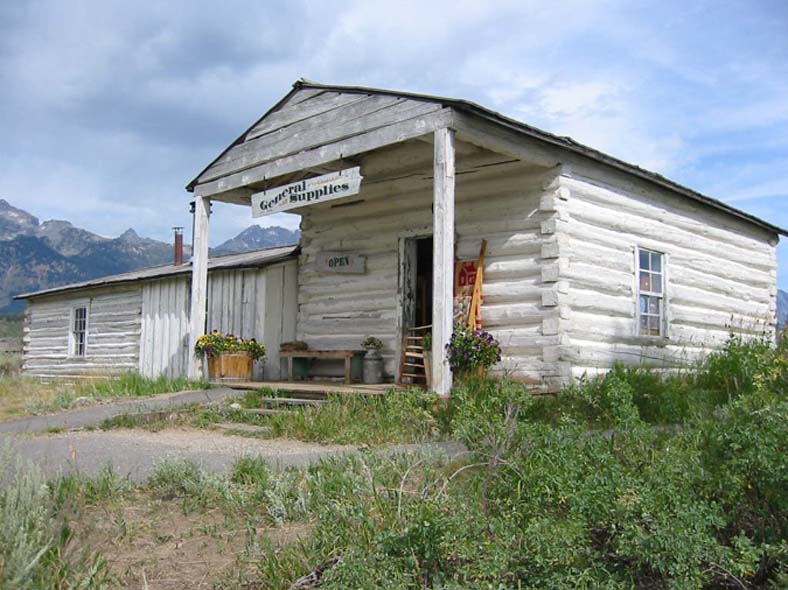
- Menor's Ferry homestead

- Location within Wyoming Location within the United States
- Location: Moose, Wyoming
- Coordinates: 43°39′32.03820″N 110°42′42.34723″W
- Built: 1892
- Architect: Menor, Bill
- NRHP reference No.: 69000016
- Added to NRHP: April 16, 1969

Menor's Ferry was a river ferry that crossed the Snake River near the present-day Moose, Wyoming, United States. The site was homesteaded by Bill Menor in 1892-94, choosing a location where the river flowed in a single channel, rather than the braided stream that characterizes its course in most of Jackson Hole. During the 1890s it was the only homestead west of the river. Menor's homestead included a five-room cabin, a barn, a store, sheds and an icehouse on 148 acres (60 ha), irrigated by a ditch from Cottonwood Creek and at times supplemented by water raised from the Snake River by a waterwheel. Menor operated the ferry until 1918, selling to Maude Noble, who continued operations until 1927, when a bridge was built at Moose.

== Menor cabin and store ==
The Menor house and store are unusual in their application of classical forms to rustic log construction, an effect heightened by the whitewashed walls of the buildings. Menor made his own whitewash using materials from a lime pit on his brother Holiday Menor's property on the other side of the river. The Menor cabin has three rooms, built individually over a period of time, with a bedroom on the west, a store on the east, and a kitchen and storage room connecting them. The Menor cabin was the point of departure for the first ascent of Grand Teton on August 11, 1898, and it hosted the celebratory party that evening.

The Menor brothers were originally from Ohio. Holiday joined Bill in Jackson Hole in 1905, but the brothers did not speak for two years. Bill moved to California after selling to Noble. Holiday, eleven years younger, joined him about 1927.

== Noble Cabin ==
The property also includes the log Maud Noble Cabin, built in 1916 to the northwest of the present site on Cottonwood Creek and relocated to the ferry site when Noble bought the Menor operation in 1918. Maud Noble was originally from Philadelphia; she arrived in Jackson Hole in 1915 on a visit to the Bar B C Dude Ranch and never left. The cabin is a one-story, three room structure that has been repeatedly renovated. The L-shaped building measures about 40 feet (12 m) by 16 feet (4.9 m). Noble sold the property to the Snake River Land Company in 1929 after a bridge was built just downstream to replace the ferry. A tea room operated in the cabin about 1927 or 1928, and again in 1950-51.

The cabin was the site of a meeting on July 23, 1923, where Yellowstone National Park superintendent and future National Park Service director Horace Albright met with local ranchers and businessmen, starting the process of creating Grand Teton National Park. Local attendees were Richard Winger, J. R. Jones, J. L. Enyon, and the Bar B C's Struthers Burt and Horace Carncross. Noble provided the discreet premises, but did not attend herself.

== Restoration ==
The property was bought in 1929 by John D. Rockefeller Jr., who restored the structures and the ferry and donated the property to the National Park Service in 1953. The property was added to the National Register of Historic Places in 1969. The Park Service has restored the hand-operated ferry to operation from 2009. The ferry is a pontoon of two floats with a platform spanning between them, with sufficient room for a wagon and four-horse team. It is a reaction ferry, which uses the force of the river to propel the pontoon along a cable stretched across the river. The Park Service has also restored Menor's well. The ferry district was placed on the National Register of Historic Places on April 16, 1969.

== See also ==
- Historical buildings and structures of Grand Teton National Park
