= Schwabachers Landing =

Coordinates: 43°43′45″N 110°39′42″W

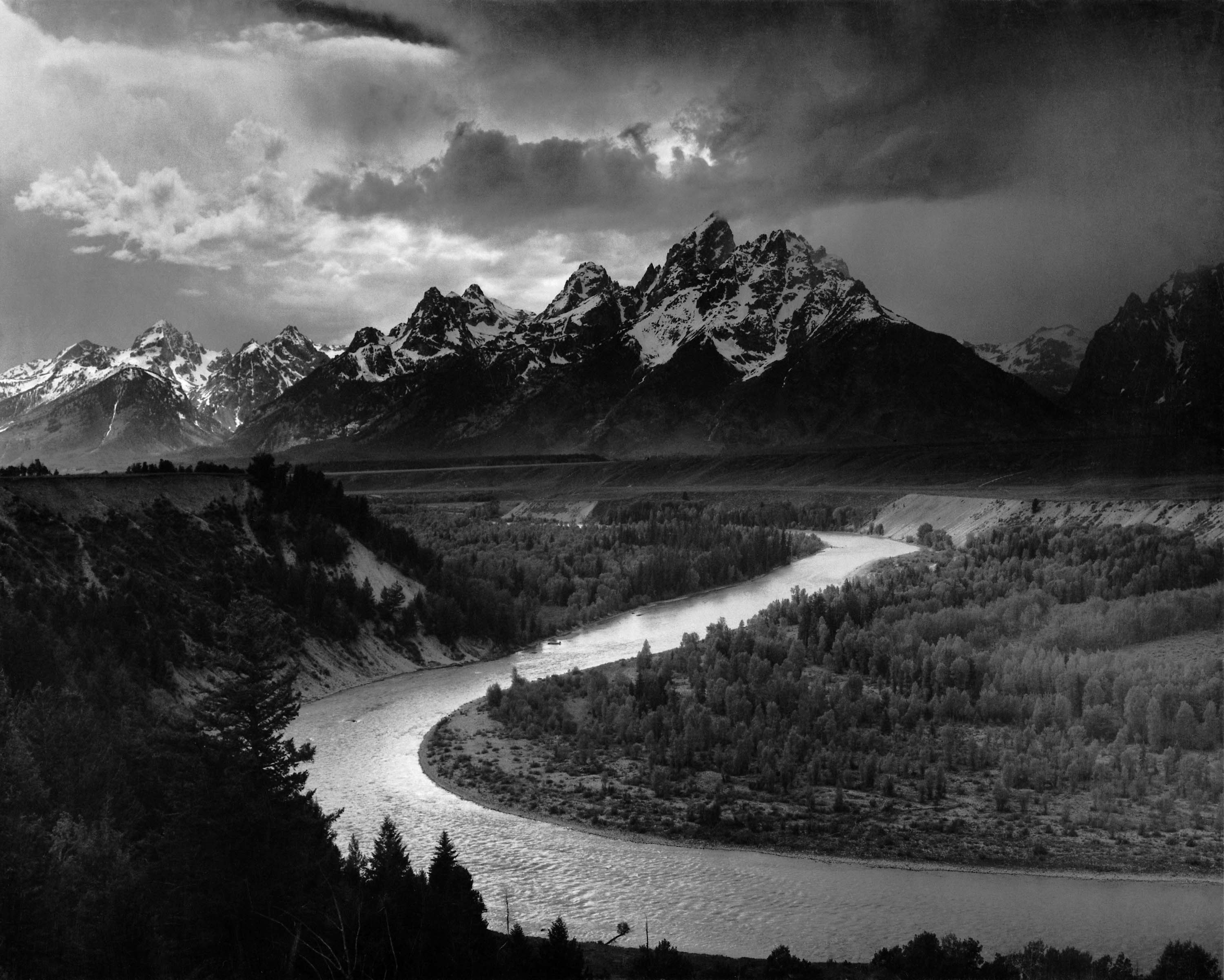
Snake River Overlook is seen in this classic 1942 photograph taken by Ansel Adams

Schwabacher Landing is a boat landing located a few miles south of Snake River Overlook, along the east shore of the Snake River in Grand Teton National Park, Wyoming, U.S. The boat landing is located off the combined U.S. Route 26/89/187, 5 miles (8 km) north of the park's main headquarters at Moose, Wyoming. The landing is accessed via a dirt road immediately north of Moose and is impassable in the winter. Fishermen, canoeists and rafters use the landing to gain access to the Snake River, and it is one of four locations in Grand Teton National Park where the river is easily accessed. Wildlife including moose, pronghorn, mule deer and bald eagles are commonly seen in the immediate vicinity of the landing. Above the landing, along the main highway, some of the finest vistas of the Teton Range, are available and a number of excellent images have been painted and photographed from that vantage point. Privately owned tour companies provide guided fishing and rafting trips commencing from the landing, and the immediate area is a popular spot for wedding parties.
