= Jenny Lake CCC Camp NP-4 =

- U.S. National Register of Historic Places
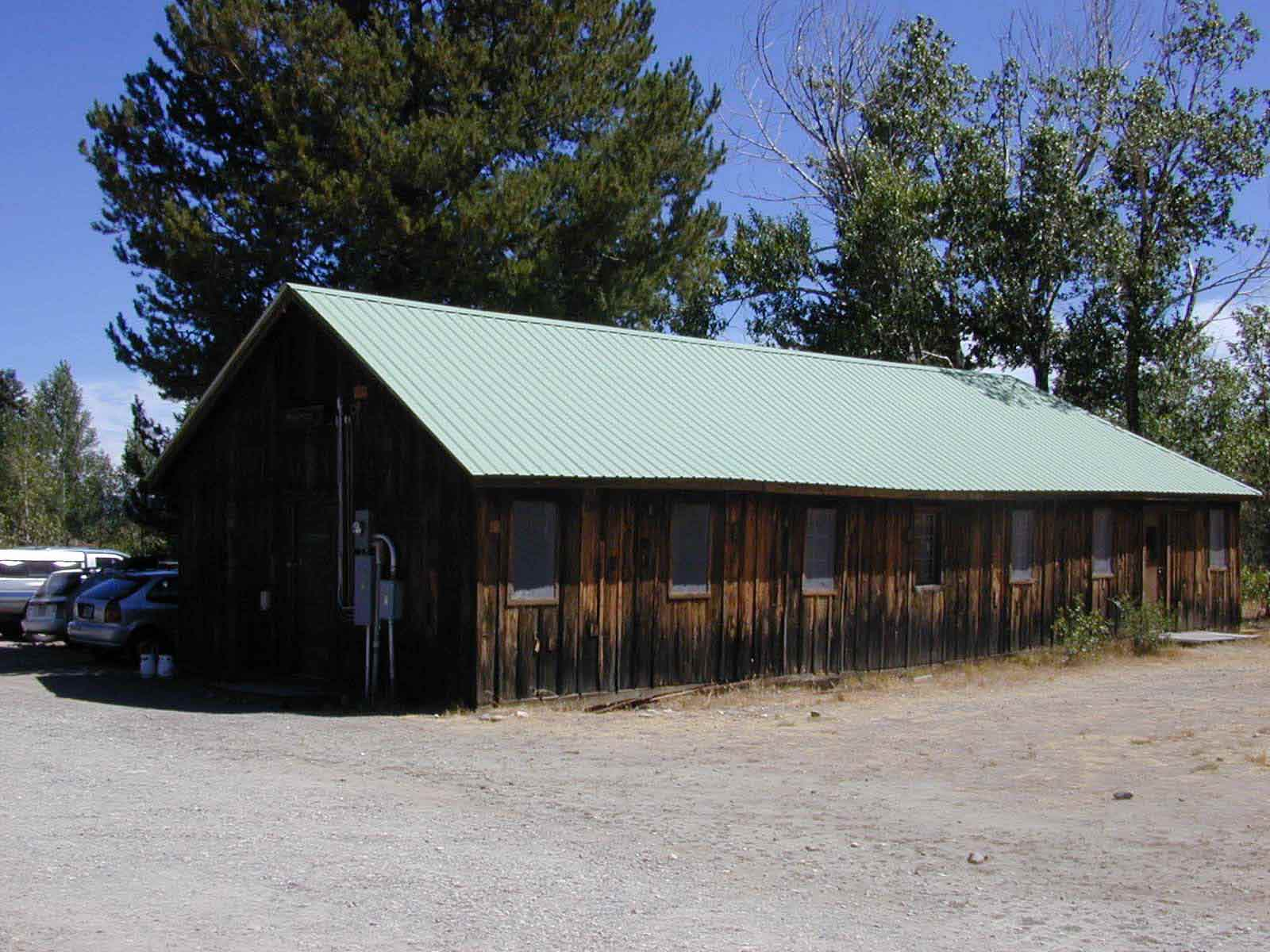
- CCC mess hall

- Location within Wyoming Location within the United States
- Nearest city: Moose, Wyoming
- Coordinates: 43°44′58″N 110°43′28″W
- Architect: NPS
- MPS: Grand Teton National Park MPS
- NRHP reference No.: 98001033
- Added to NRHP: July 7, 2006

CCC Camp NP-4, also known as the Horse Concessioner Dormitory and the Climbing Concession Office, at Jenny Lake in Grand Teton National Park was the largest Civilian Conservation Corps camp in Grand Teton. Located at the South end of Jenny Lake, the camp housed young men from 1934 to 1942, who worked on improvements to trails, campsites, employee housing, utilities and timber salvage at Jackson Lake. The surviving structures include a messhall and a bathhouse.

It is unusual for CCC facilities to survive, as they were typically dismantled when the CCC program was completed. The camp was later used as a base camp for mountain climbing concessioners. The camp became known as the "C-Camp," accommodating climbers close to the base of the mountains. The bathhouse became the base for Paul Petzoldt and Glenn Exum's Petzoldt-Exum School of American Mountaineering. The building is still in use as the summer base for Exum Mountain Guides. It was listed on the National Register of Historic Places on July 7, 2006.

== See also ==
- Historical buildings and structures of Grand Teton National Park
