= Signal Mountain Lodge =

Resort in Wyoming

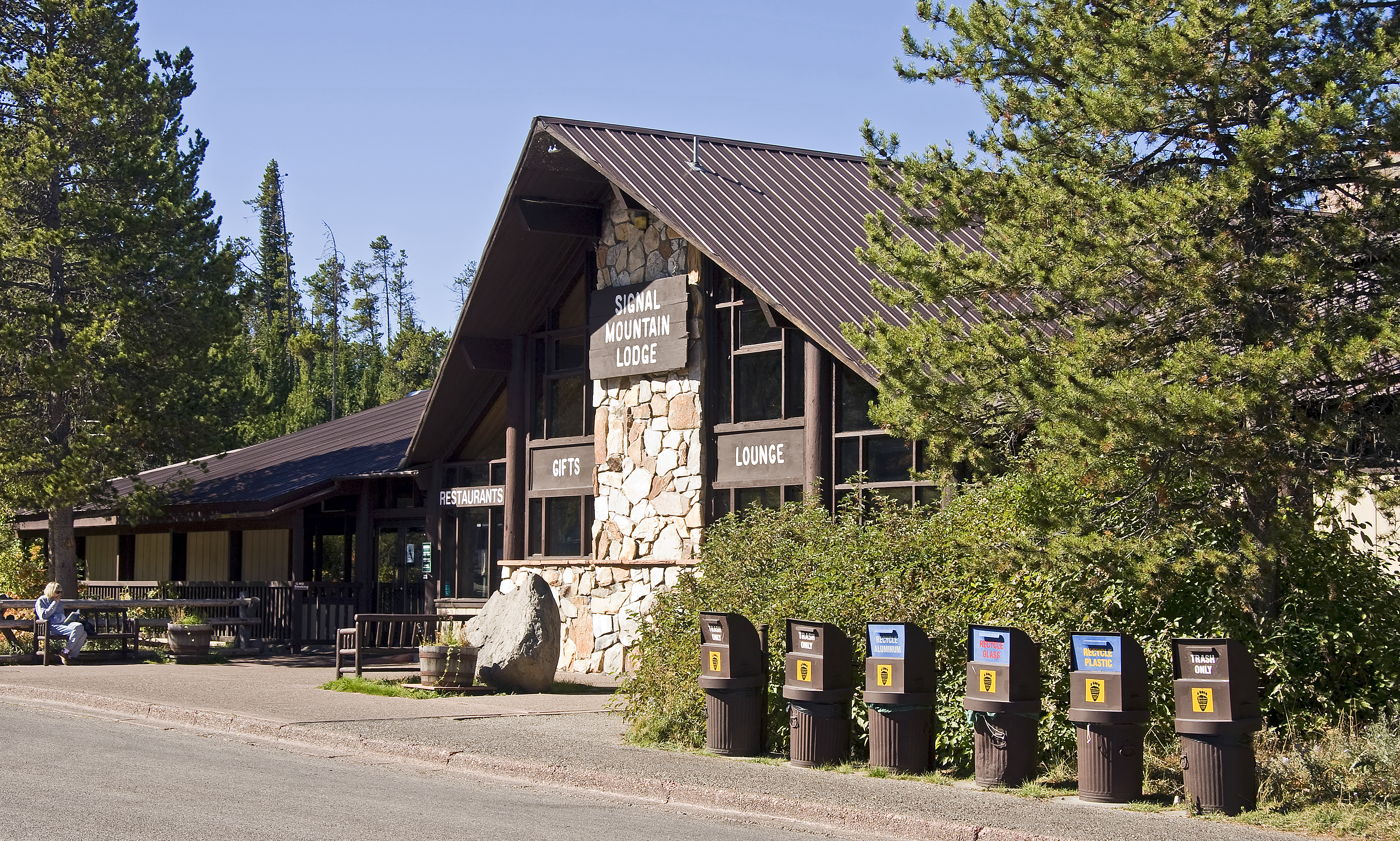

- Location within the United States
- Former names: Wort Lodge and Camp
- Hotel chain: Forever Resorts (operator)

General information
- Architectural style: Rustic architecture
- Location: Grand Teton National Park, Wyoming
- Coordinates: 43°50′35.85″N 110°36′41.28″W
- Elevation: c. 6,780 ft (2,070 m)

Signal Mountain Lodge is a rustic style resort located within Grand Teton National Park on Jackson Lake. The resort started in the 1920s as a fishing camp operated by Ole Warner. The camp was purchased in 1931 by the Wort family of Jackson, Wyoming, who owned other concessions in the park, renaming it the Wort Lodge and Camp. The camp consisted of 32 structures, including guest cabins, a store, a gas station and a rustic lodge. The Worts sold the resort in 1940 to the Harris family, when it was renamed the Signal Mountain Lodge after nearby Signal Mountain, using the proceeds to build the Wort Hotel in Jackson. Little or nothing survives from the Wort's resort; the lodge was demolished by 1963 and replaced with an enlarged facility, although some of the Wort-built cabins may remain on the property.

The new owners built new cabins, a store, restaurant, and utility buildings. For a time in the 1970s, the Signal Mountain organization operated Leek's Lodge and marina on upper Jackson Lake. The Harrises sold the concession to Rex Maughan, operator of the Forever Resorts concession in a number of national and state parks, in 1984.
