= Snake River Land Company =

The Snake River Land Company or the Snake River Cattle and Stock Company was a land purchasing company established in 1927 by philanthropist John D. Rockefeller Jr. The company acted as a front so Rockefeller could buy land in the Jackson Hole valley in Wyoming without people knowing of his involvement or his intentions for the property, and have the land held until the National Park Service could administer it.

The company launched a campaign to purchase more than 35,000 acres (142 km^{2}) for $1.4 million but faced 15 years of opposition by ranchers and a refusal by the Park Service to take the land. Allegations that the company conspired with the Park Service by using illegal land purchasing tactics led to United States Senate subcommittee meetings in 1933 during which the company and the service were exonerated. Hard times during the Great Depression alleviated opposition by ranchers to sell.

Discouraged by the stalemate, Rockefeller sent a letter to U.S. President Franklin D. Roosevelt telling him that if the federal government did not accept the land that "it will be my thought to make some other disposition of it or to sell it in the market to any satisfactory buyers". Soon afterward on March 15, 1943, the president declared 221,000 acres (894 km^{2}) of land as Jackson Hole National Monument. The land, however, did not enter federal stewardship until December 16, 1949 when it was added to the monument. The next year, the monument was merged into the expanded Grand Teton National Park.

== See also ==
- Snake River Land Company Residence and Office: Buildings associated with the Snake River Land Company in Grand Teton National Park, listed on the National Register of Historic Places
