= Outline of Grand Teton National Park =

National park in Wyoming, United States

The following articles relate to the history, geography, geology, flora, fauna, structures and recreation in Grand Teton National Park.

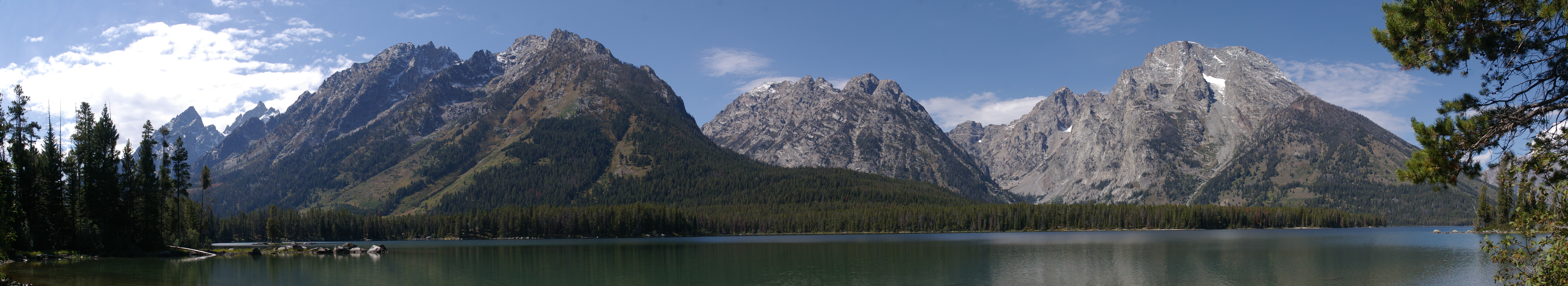
The Teton Range from Leigh Lake

== History ==
- Exploration
  - Hayden Geological Survey of 1871
  - Raynolds Expedition
  - Rocky Mountain Fur Company
- Native Americans
  - Shoshone people
- People
  - Explorers
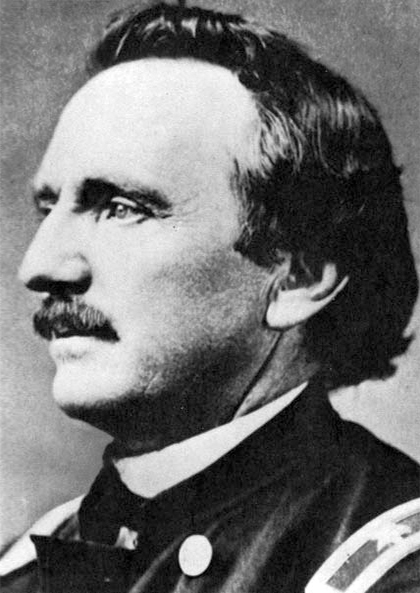
    William F. Raynolds
    - Jim Bridger - Mountain man familiar with Northwest Wyoming who was the guide of the Raynolds Expedition
    - John Colter - First person of European descent to enter Jackson Hole and see the Teton Range
    - Warren Angus Ferris - Early Yellowstone and Teton region trapper
    - Ferdinand Vandeveer Hayden - U.S. Geological Surveys 1871-1875 of Yellowstone and Teton region
    - David Edward Jackson - Known as "Davey" Jackson and namesake for Jackson Hole
    - Donald Mackenzie - Explorer of western Wyoming
    - William F. Raynolds - Supervised first U.S. Government sponsored expedition (Raynolds Expedition) to enter Jackson Hole
    - Alexander Ross - Early fur trader in Yellowstone and Teton region
  - Landowners
    - John D. Rockefeller Jr.
    - Laurance S. Rockefeller
    - Snake River Land Company
  - Developers
    - Maxwell Struthers Burt
  - Park superintendents and administrators
  - Horace M. Albright
  - Park rangers
  - Mountaineers
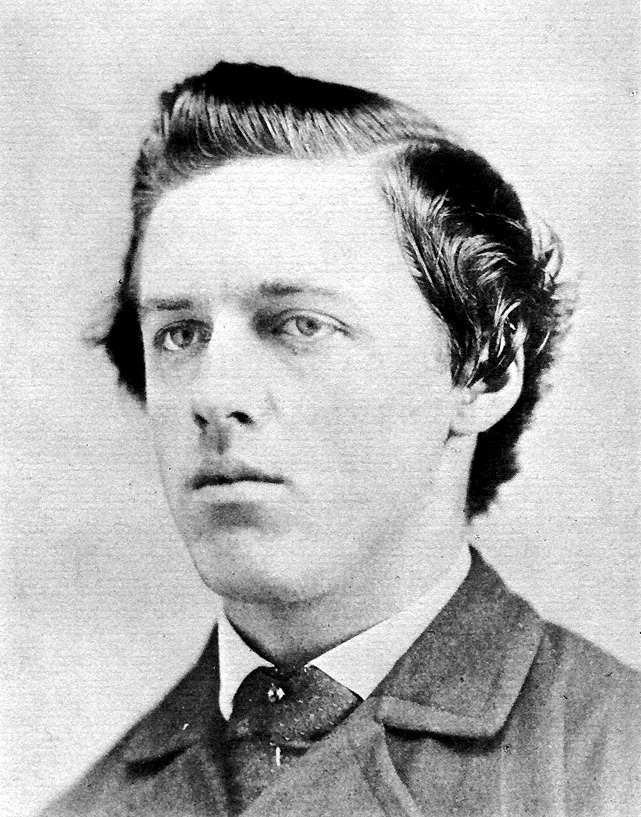
    William Henry Jackson
    - Albert R. Ellingwood
    - Glenn Exum
    - Exum Mountain Guides
    - Fritiof Fryxell
    - John Gill
    - Nathaniel P. Langford
    - William O. Owen
    - Paul Petzoldt
    - Franklin Spencer Spalding
  - Engineers and architects
    - Gilbert Stanley Underwood
  - Photographers, artists and illustrators
    - Heinrich C. Berann - Panoramic artist
    - Albert Bierstadt - Early Yellowstone artist
    - William Henry Jackson - US Geological Survey photographer 1869-1878
    - Thomas Moran - Early Yellowstone artist - guest member of 1871 Hayden Geological Survey
  - Naturalists and scientists
    - A. Starker Leopold - author of the 1963 Leopold Report-Wildlife Management in the National Parks
    - Adolph Murie - National Park Service wildlife biologist - published seminar study on coyotes in Yellowstone (1940)
    - Olaus Murie
    - Margaret Murie
  - Politicians
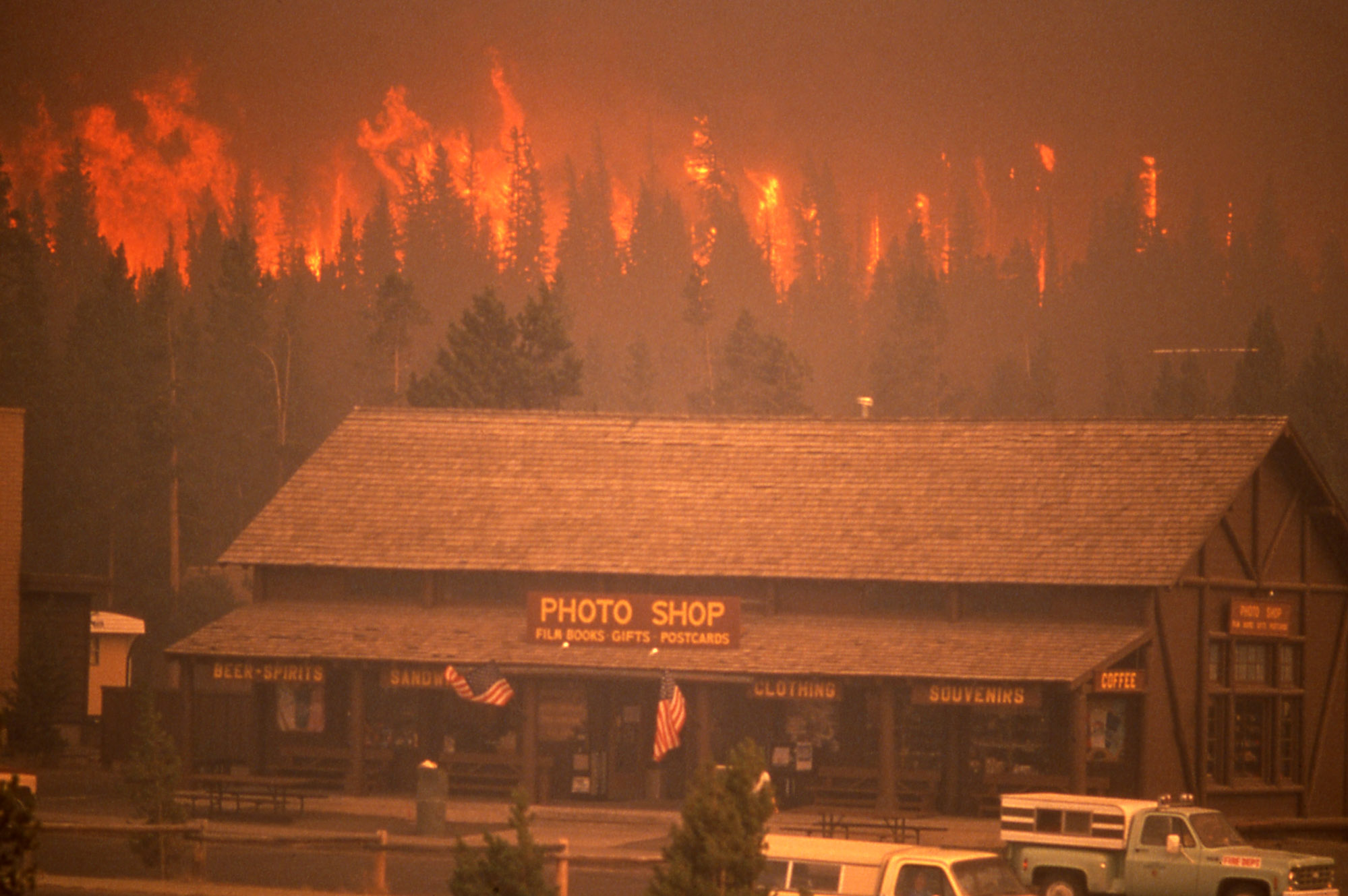
    Yellowstone fires of 1988
    - Calvin Coolidge
    - Franklin Delano Roosevelt
  - Promoters
- Historic events
  - History of the National Park Service
  - Mission 66 - National Park Service ten-year program to prepare parks for 1966 50th Anniversary
  - Teton–Yellowstone tornado - F4 tornado - July 21, 1987
  - Yellowstone fires of 1988
- Advocates
  - Greater Yellowstone Coalition
  - Yellowstone to Yukon Conservation Initiative
- Concessionaires

== Geography ==
- Park units and related areas
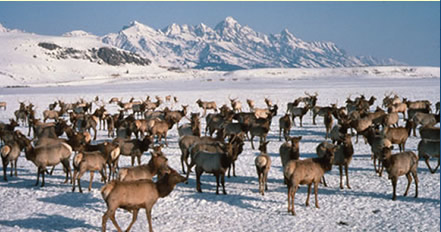
  National Elk Refuge
  - Bridger-Teton National Forest
  - Caribou-Targhee National Forest
  - Jackson Hole National Monument
  - Jedediah Smith Wilderness
  - National Elk Refuge
- Rivers
  - Buffalo Fork
  - Cascade Creek
  - Gros Ventre River
  - Pacific Creek
  - Snake River
- Lakes
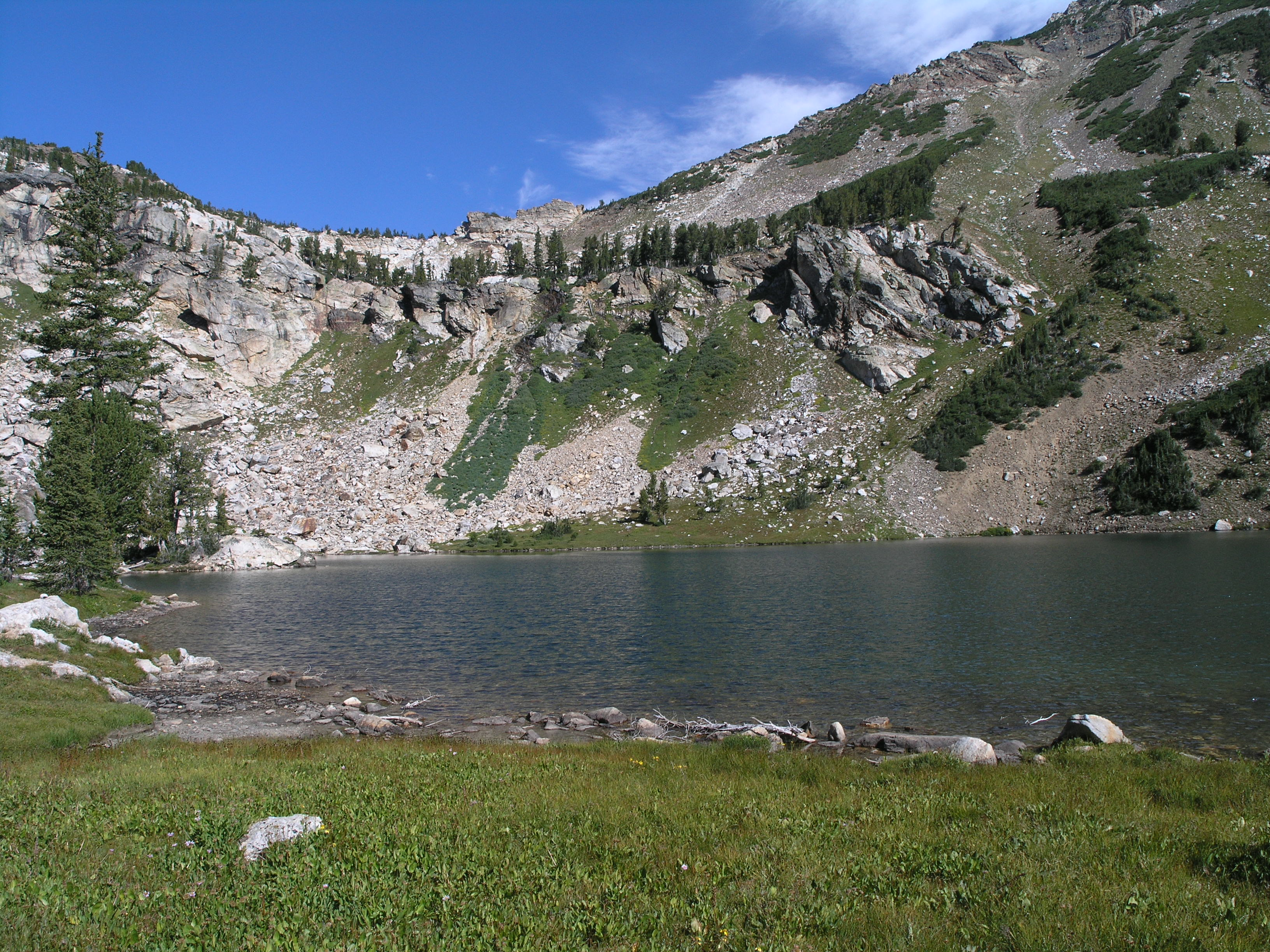
  Holly Lake
  - Amphitheater Lake
  - Arrowhead Pool
  - Bearpaw Lake
  - Bradley Lake
  - Cirque Lake
  - Cow Lake
  - Coyote Lake
  - Delta Lake
  - Dudley Lake
  - Elk Ranch Reservoir
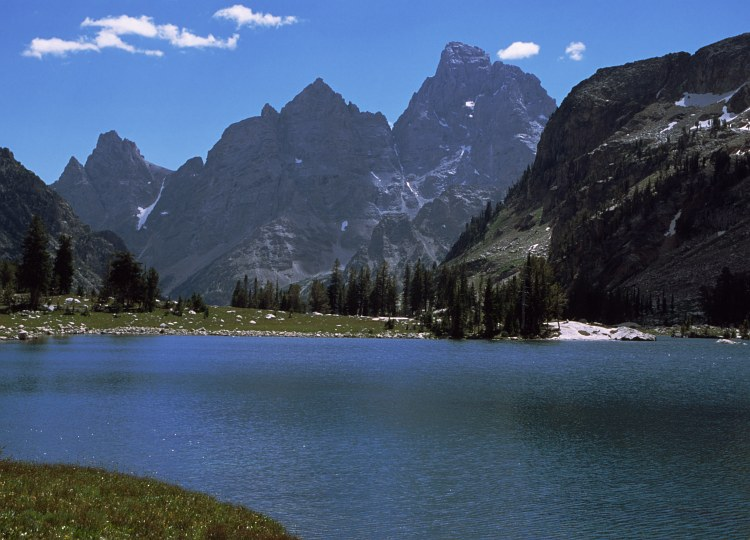
    Lake Solitude
  - Emma Matilda Lake
  - Forget-me-not Lakes
  - Grizzly Bear Lake
  - Holly Lake
  - Icefloe Lake
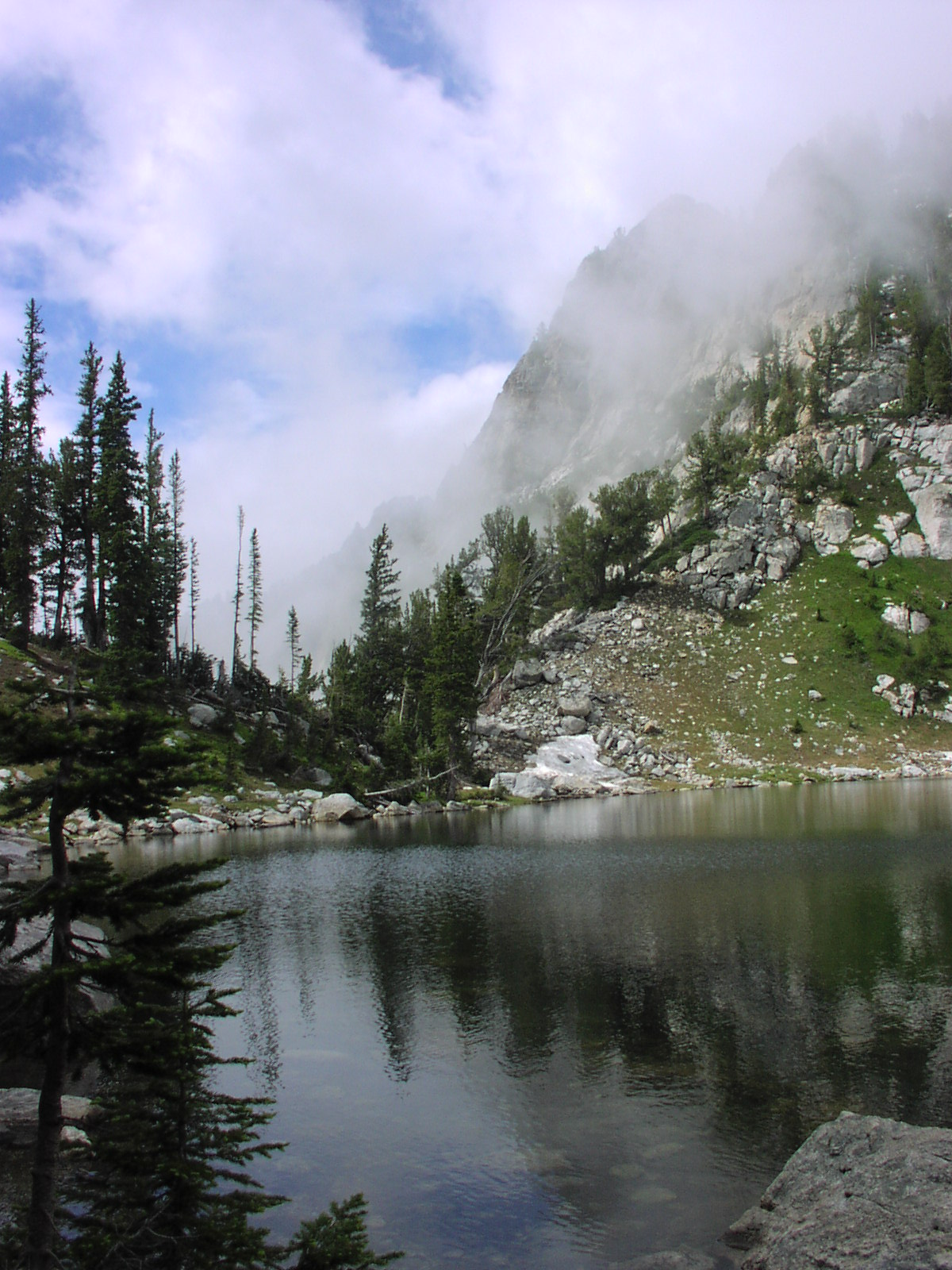
    Surprise Lake
  - Indian Lake
  - Jackson Lake
  - Jenny Lake
  - Kit Lake
  - Lake of the Crags
  - Lake Solitude
  - Lake Taminah
  - Laurel Lake
  - Leigh Lake
  - Marion Lake
  - Mica Lake
  - Mink Lake
  - Phelps Lake
  - Ramshead Lake
  - Rimrock Lake
  - Snowdrift Lake
  - String Lake
  - Surprise Lake
  - Taggart Lake
  - Talus Lake
  - Timberline Lake
  - Trapper Lake
  - Two Ocean Lake
- Mountains
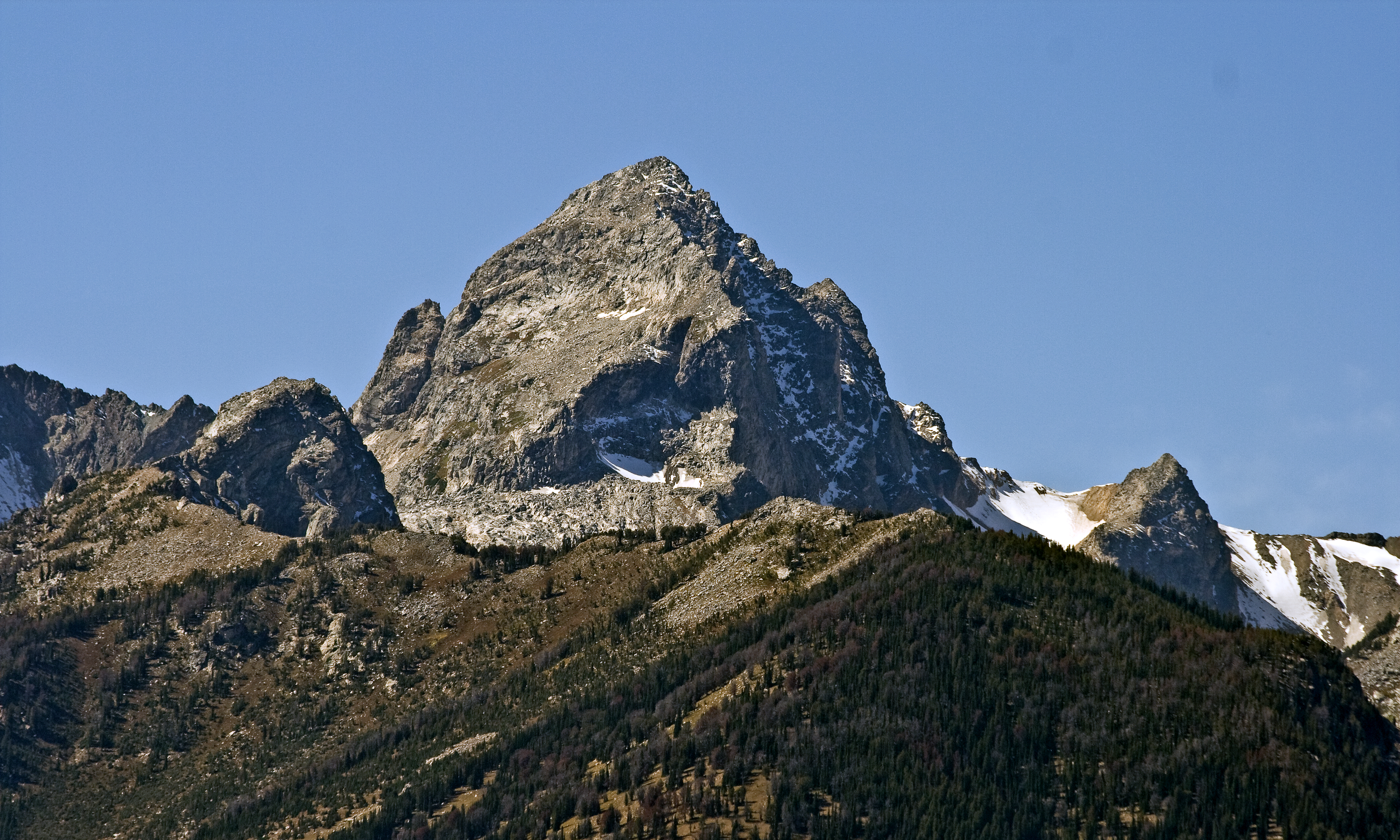
  Buck Mountain
  - Bivouac Peak
  - Blacktail Butte
  - Buck Mountain
  - Cathedral Group
  - Cleaver Peak
  - Cloudveil Dome
  - Disappointment Peak
  - Doane Peak
  - Dry Ridge Mountain
  - Eagles Rest Peak
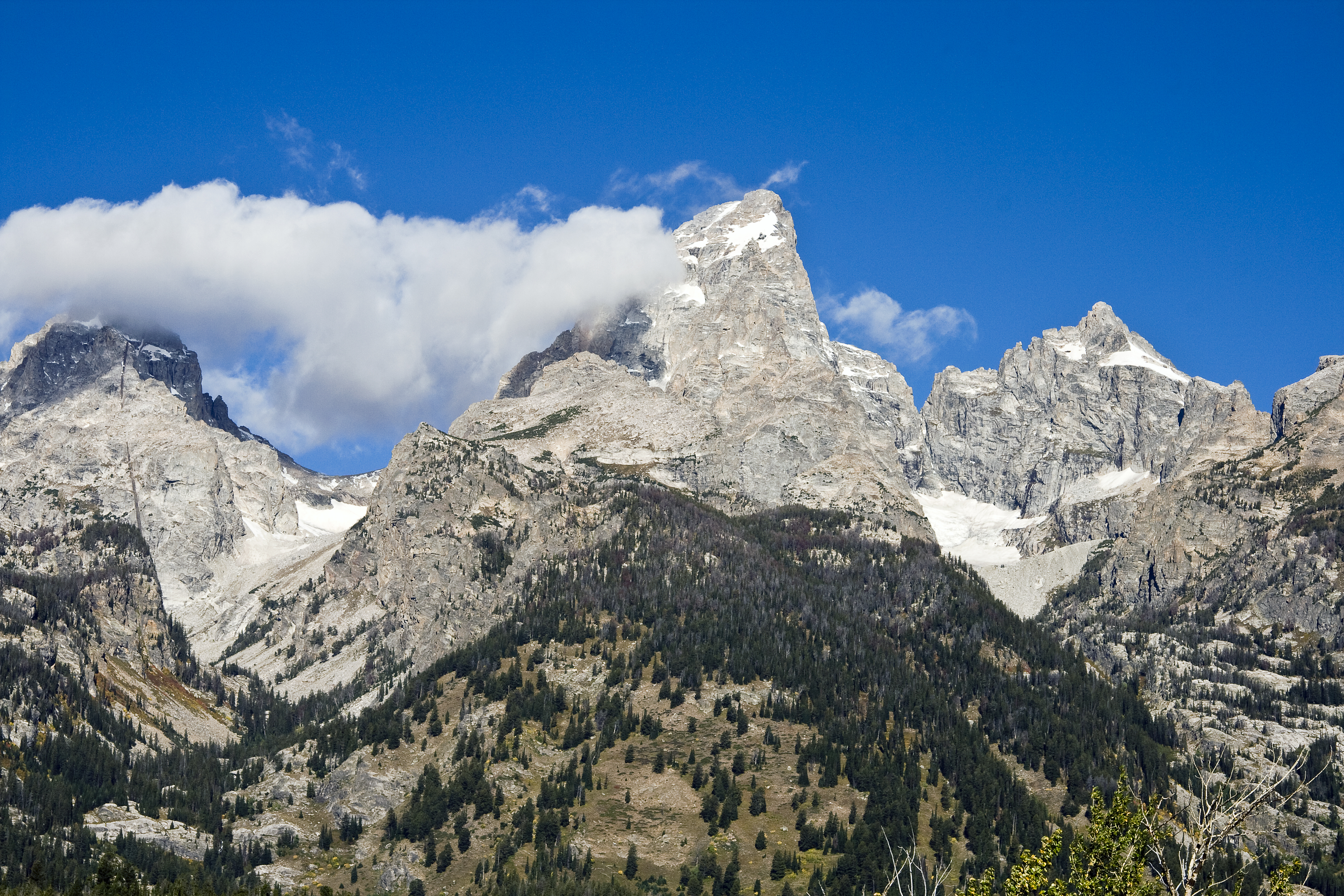
    Grand Teton at center with Middle Teton at left and Mount Owen at right
  - Elk Mountain
  - Forellen Peak
  - Grand Teton
  - Green Lakes Mountain
  - Littles Peak
  - Maidenform Peak
  - Middle Teton
  - Moose Mountain
  - Mount Bannon
  - Mount Hunt
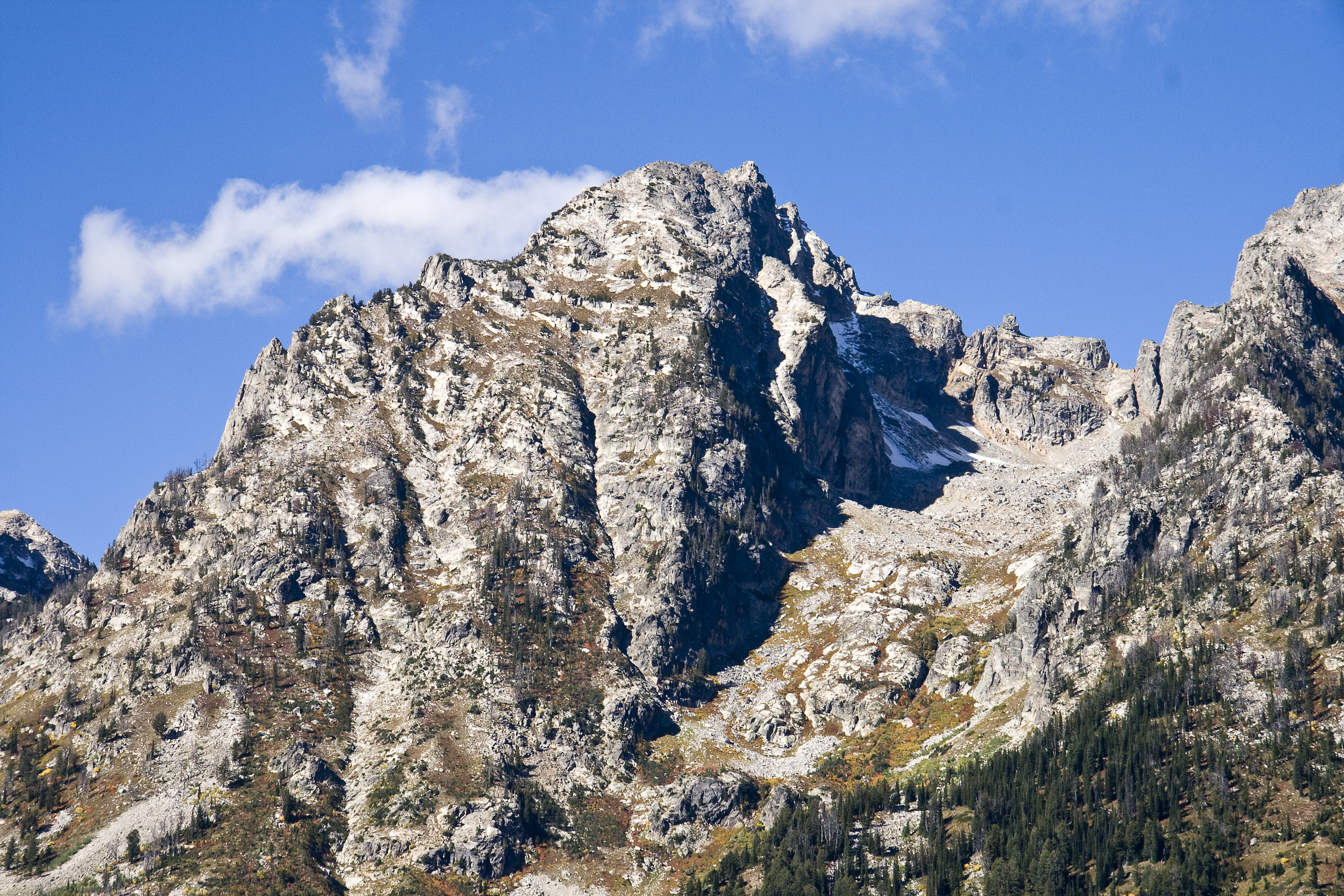
    Mount Saint John
  - Mount Jedediah Smith
  - Mount Meek
  - Mount Moran
  - Mount Owen
  - Mount Saint John
  - Mount Wister
  - Mount Woodring
  - Nez Perce Peak
  - Owl Peak
  - Prospectors Mountain
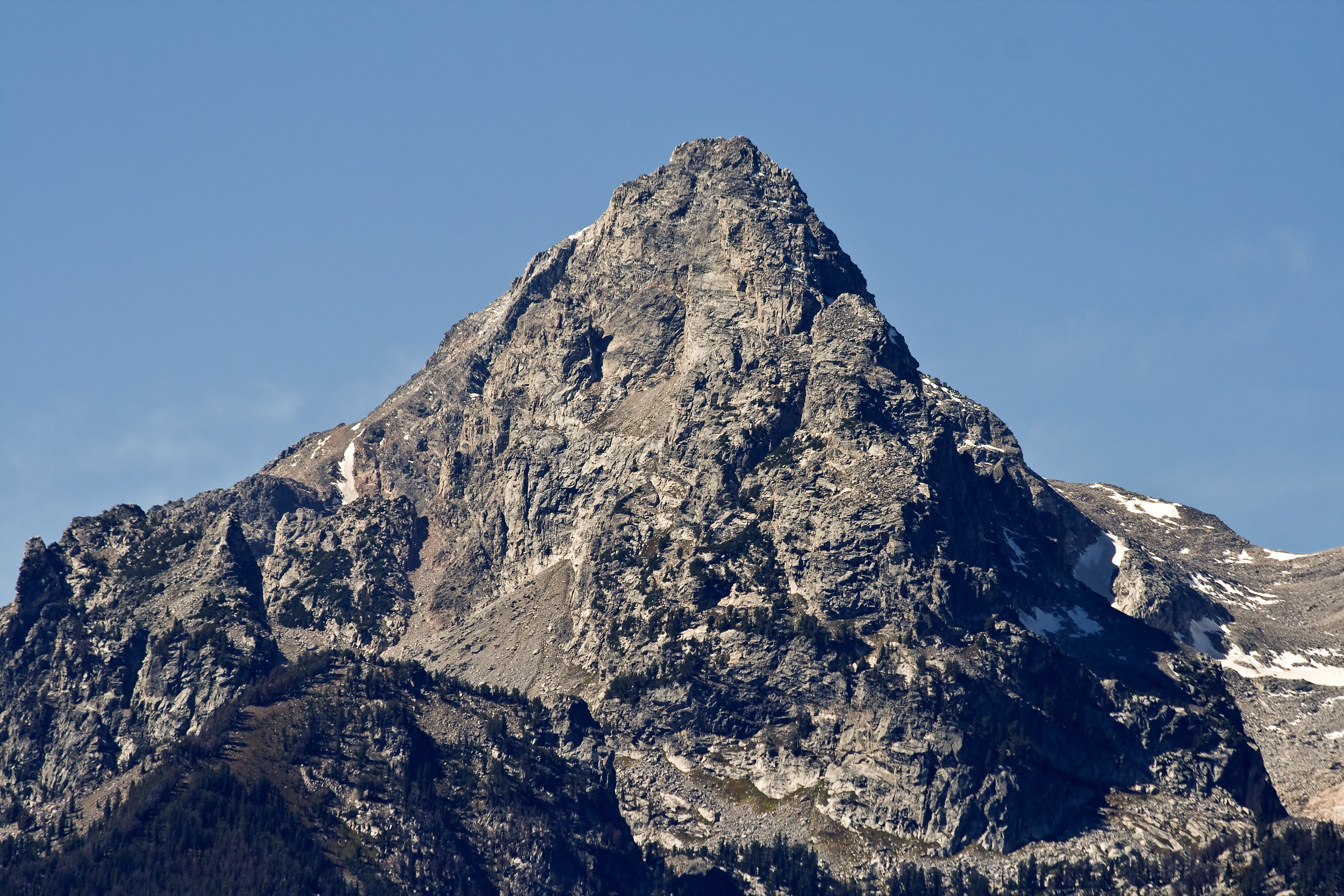
    South Teton
  - Ranger Peak
  - Raynolds Peak
  - Red Mountain
  - Rendezvous Mountain
  - Rock of Ages
  - Rockchuck Peak
  - Rolling Thunder Mountain
  - Shadow Peak
  - Signal Mountain
  - South Teton
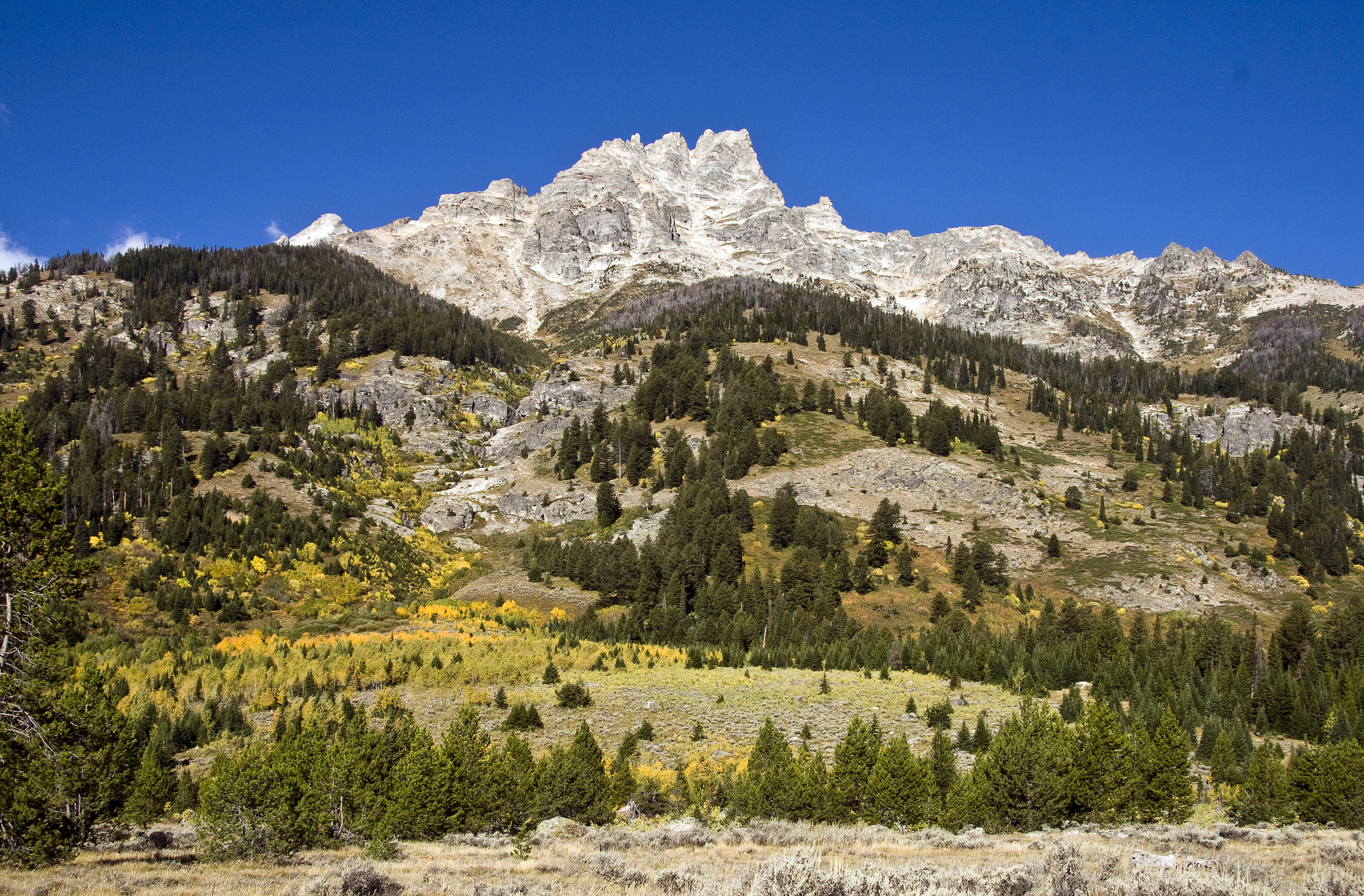
    Teewinot Mountain
  - Static Peak
  - Survey Peak
  - Symmetry Spire
  - Table Mountain
  - Teepe Pillar
  - Teewinot Mountain
  - The Jaw
  - The Wall
  - Thor Peak
  - Traverse Peak
  - Veiled Peak
  - Window Peak
- Canyons and Valleys
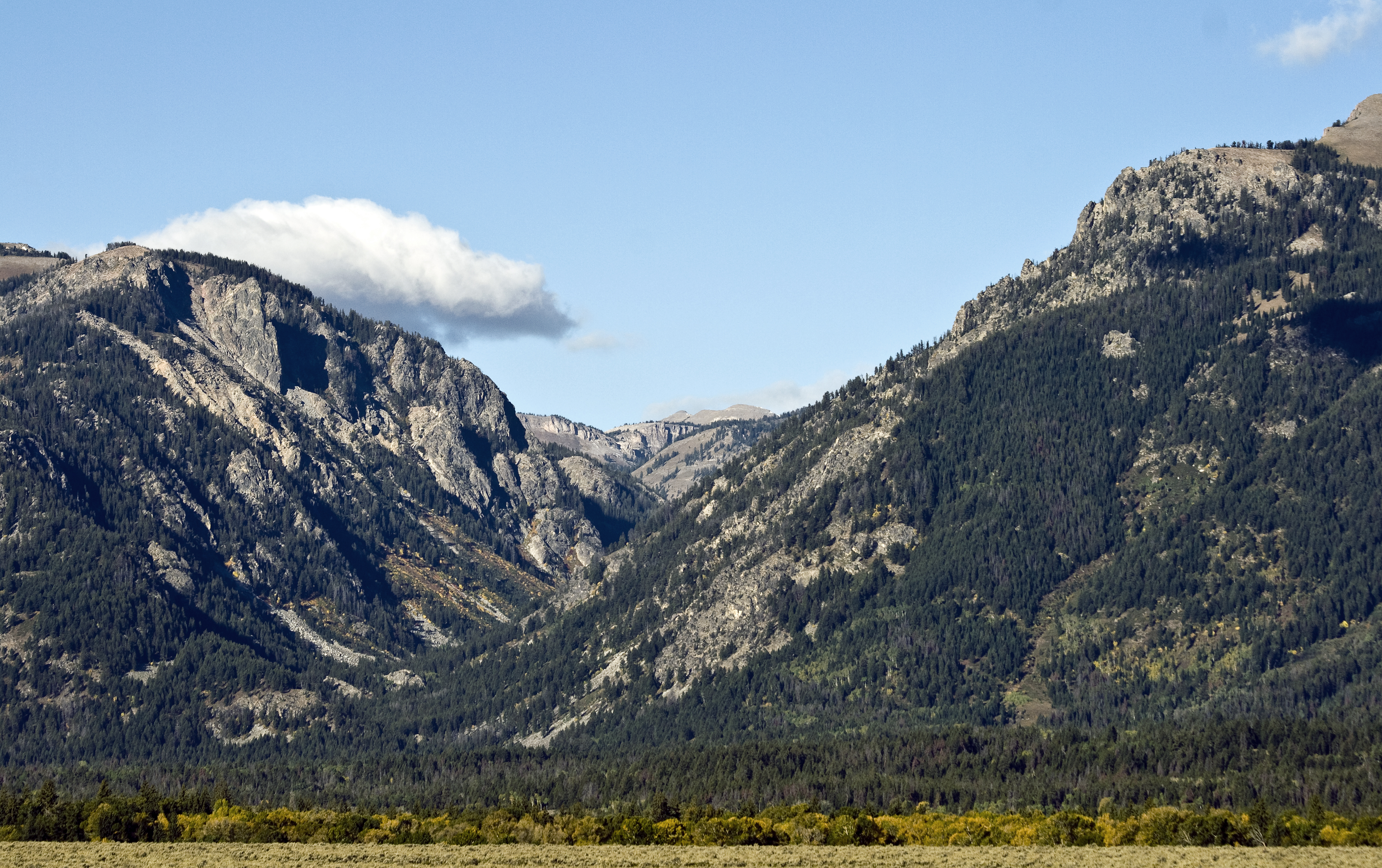
  Granite Canyon
  - Avalanche Canyon
  - Cascade Canyon
  - Colter Canyon
  - Death Canyon
  - Garnet Canyon
  - Granite Canyon
  - Hanging Canyon
  - Jackson Hole
  - Leigh Canyon
  - Moran Canyon
  - Open Canyon
  - Paintbrush Canyon
  - Snowshoe Canyon
  - Valhalla Canyon
  - Waterfalls Canyon
  - Webb Canyon
- Glaciers
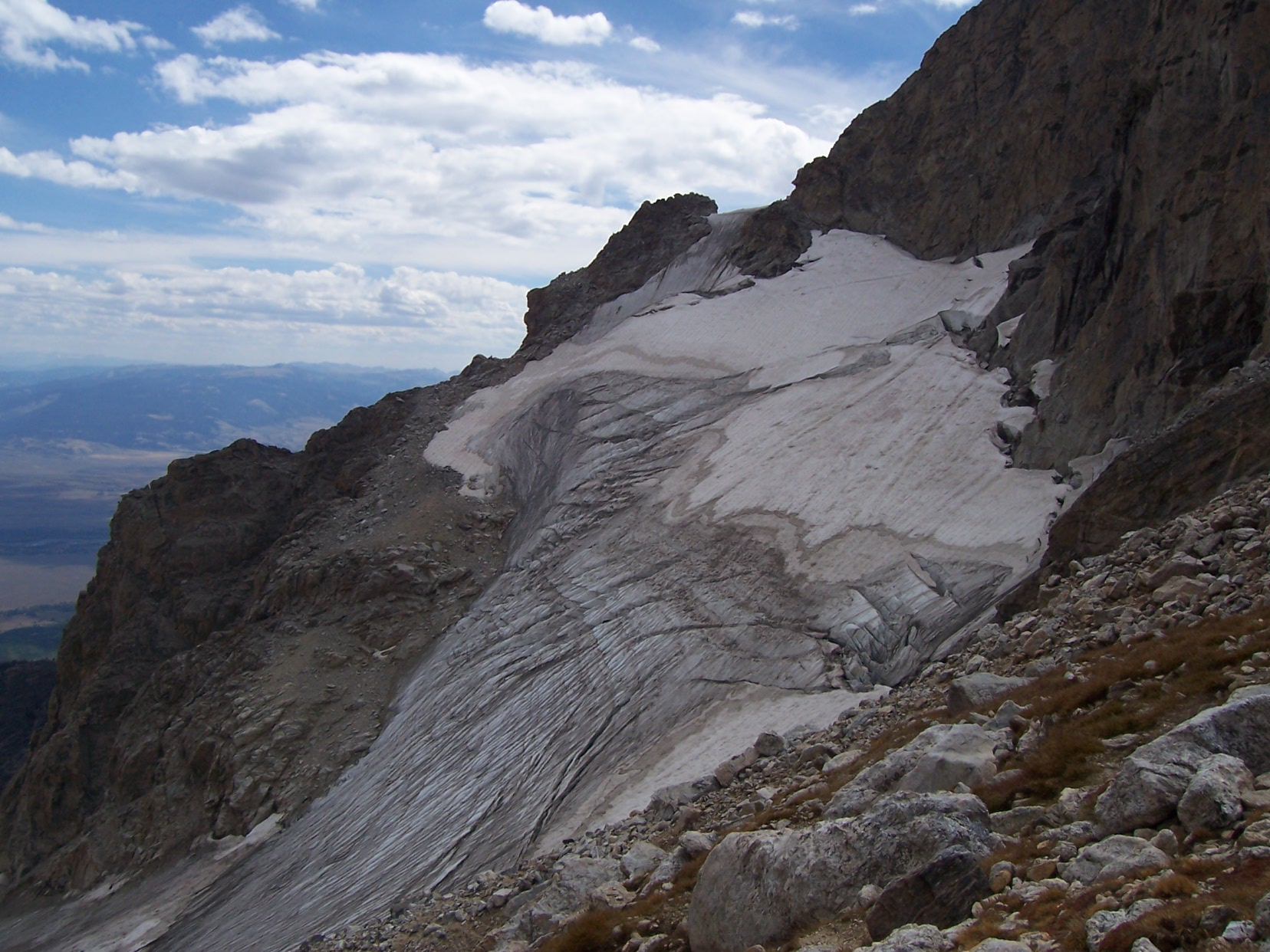
  Middle Teton Glacier
  - Falling Ice Glacier
  - Middle Teton Glacier
  - Petersen Glacier
  - Schoolroom Glacier
  - Skillet Glacier
  - Teepe Glacier
  - Teton Glacier
  - Triple Glaciers
- Roads and passes
- Resource development
  - Jackson Hole Airport
  - Jackson Lake Dam
  - Minidoka Project
  - John D. Rockefeller Jr. Memorial Parkway

== Geology ==
- Geologic formations
  - Death Canyon Shelf
  - Huckleberry Ridge Tuff
  - Lava Creek Tuff
  - Mesa Falls Tuff

== Fauna ==
- American bison
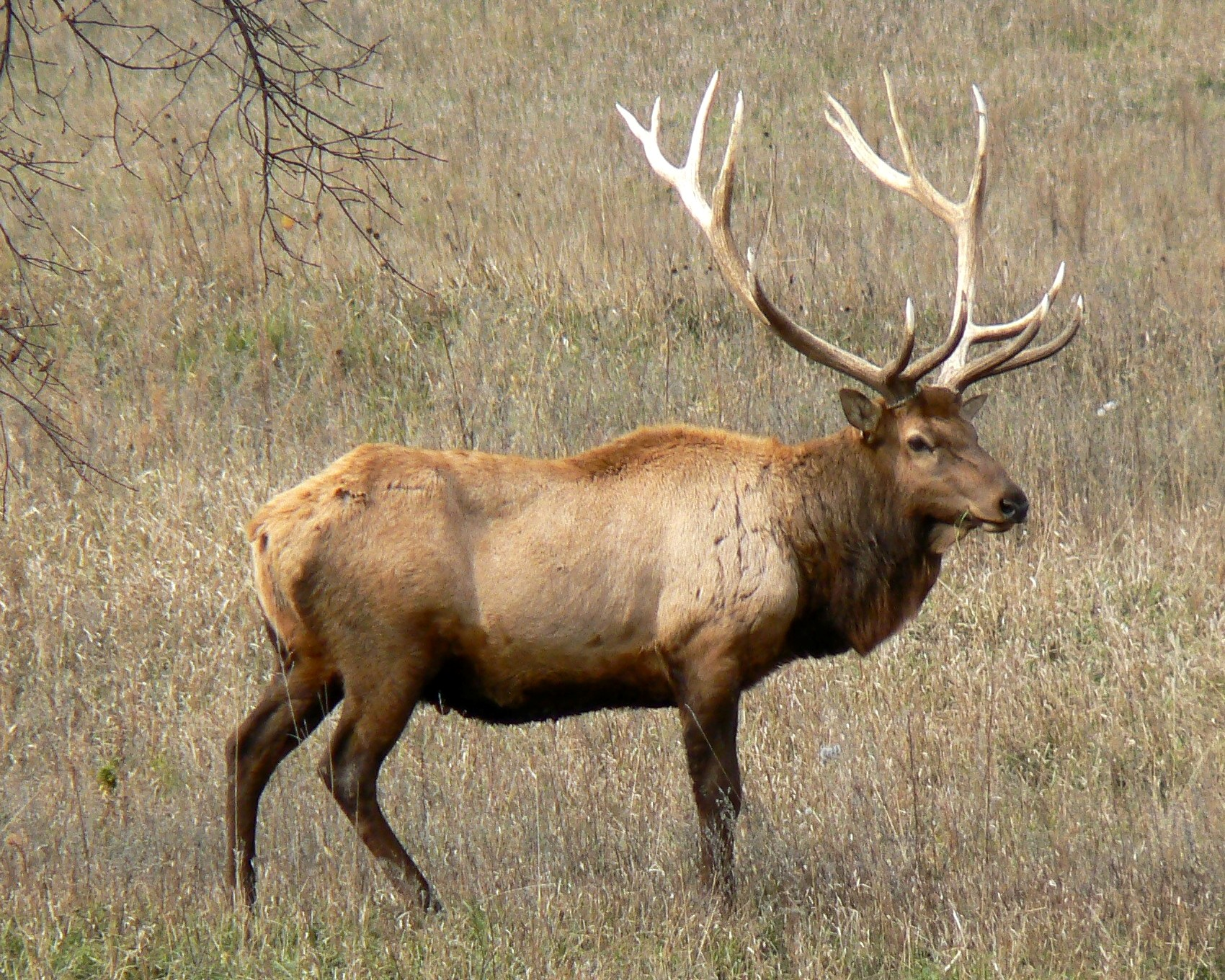
  Rocky Mountain bull elk
- Amphibians and reptiles of Yellowstone National Park
- Bighorn sheep
- Grizzly bear
- Elk
- Gray wolf
- Mammals of Grand Teton National Park
- Snake River fine-spotted cutthroat trout
- Greater Yellowstone Ecosystem
- Leopold Report - Seminal 1963 Study: "Wildlife Management In The National Parks"
- Pronghorn
- Wolf reintroduction

== Districts and structures ==
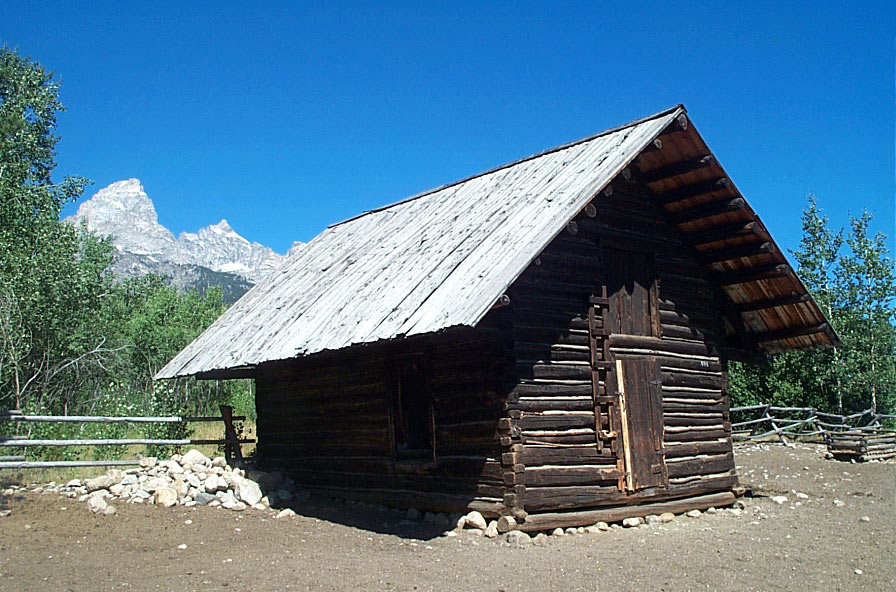
Manges Cabin

- National Register of Historic Places listings in Grand Teton National Park
- Developed areas
  - Colter Bay Village
  - Moose, Wyoming
  - Moran, Wyoming
- Structures and historic areas
  - Cascade Canyon Barn
  - Chapel of the Sacred Heart
  - Chapel of the Transfiguration
  - Death Canyon Barn
  - Double Diamond Dude Ranch Dining Hall
  - Cunningham Cabin
  - Jackson Lake Lodge
  - Jackson Lake Ranger Station
  - Jenny Lake Boat Concession Facilities
  - Jenny Lake CCC Camp NP-4
  - Jenny Lake Lodge
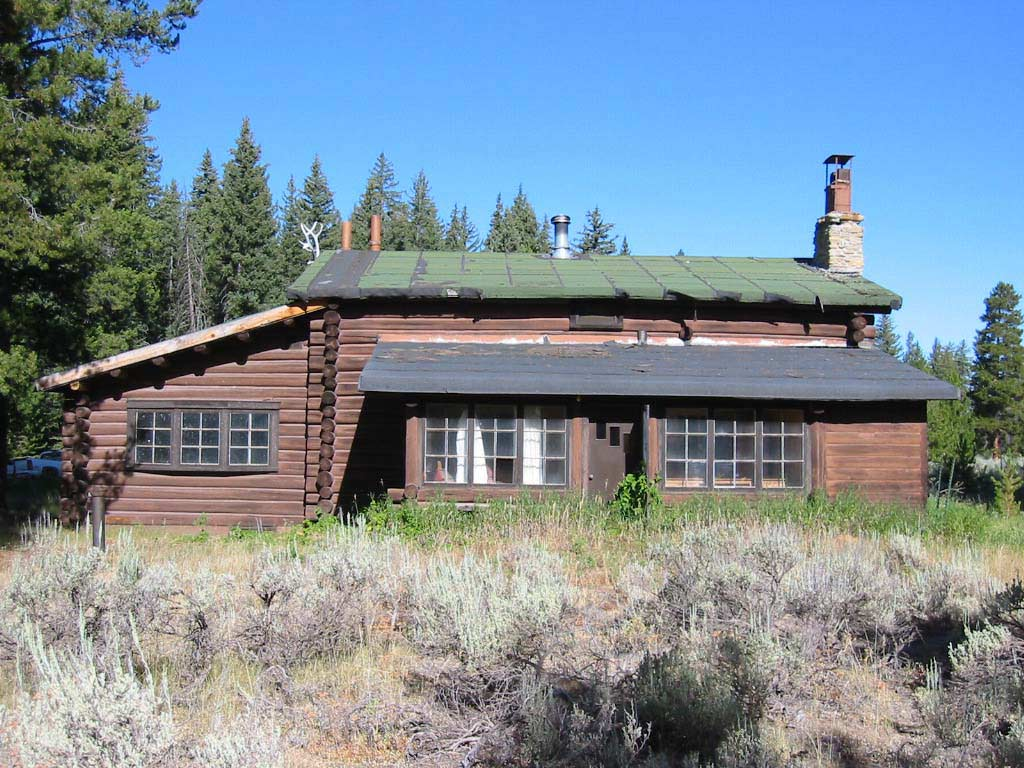
    Snake River Land Company Residence and Office
  - Jenny Lake Ranger Station Historic District
  - Leigh Lake Ranger Patrol Cabin
  - Manges Cabin
  - Menor's Ferry
  - Miller Cabin
  - Moose Entrance Kiosk
  - Moran Bay Patrol Cabin
  - Old Administrative Area Historic District
  - Signal Mountain Lodge
  - Snake River Land Company Residence and Office
  - String Lake Comfort Station
  - Upper Granite Canyon Patrol Cabin
  - White Grass Ranger Station Historic District

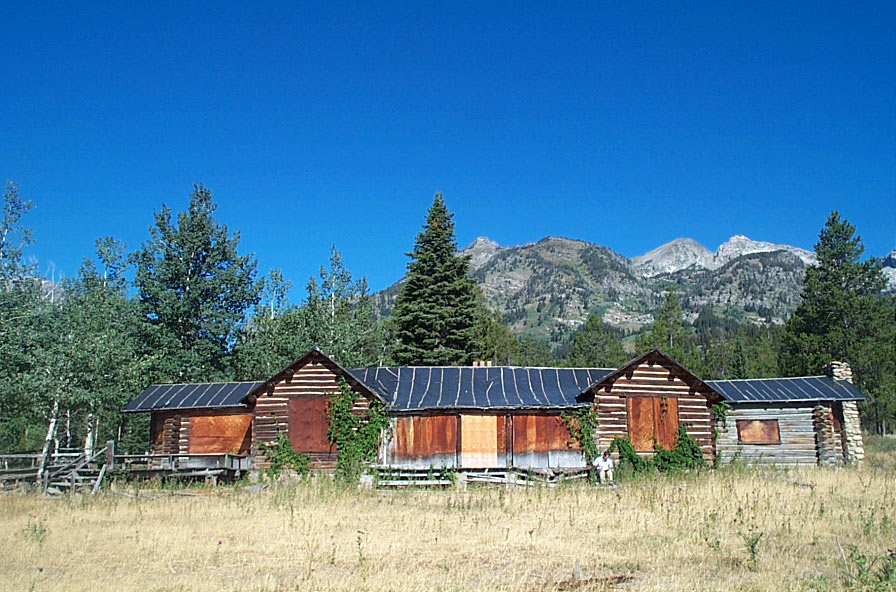
Main Cabin, White Grass Dude Ranch

- Guest ranches, dude ranches and private ranches
  - 4 Lazy F Dude Ranch
  - AMK Ranch
  - Bar B C Dude Ranch
  - Geraldine Lucas Homestead-Fabian Place Historic District
  - Highlands Historic District
  - Kimmel Kabins
  - Laurance S. Rockefeller Preserve
  - Leek's Lodge
  - Murie Ranch Historic District
  - Ramshorn Dude Ranch Lodge
  - Triangle X Barn
  - White Grass Dude Ranch
- Working ranches
  - Andy Chambers Ranch Historic District
  - Grace and Robert Miller Ranch
  - Hunter Hereford Ranch Historic District
  - Mormon Row Historic District
- Vacation homes and personal residences
  - Murie Residence
  - The Brinkerhoff

== Recreation ==
- Continental Divide Trail - Traverses southwest corner of the park
- List of hiking trails in Grand Teton National Park

== Entrance communities ==
- Wyoming
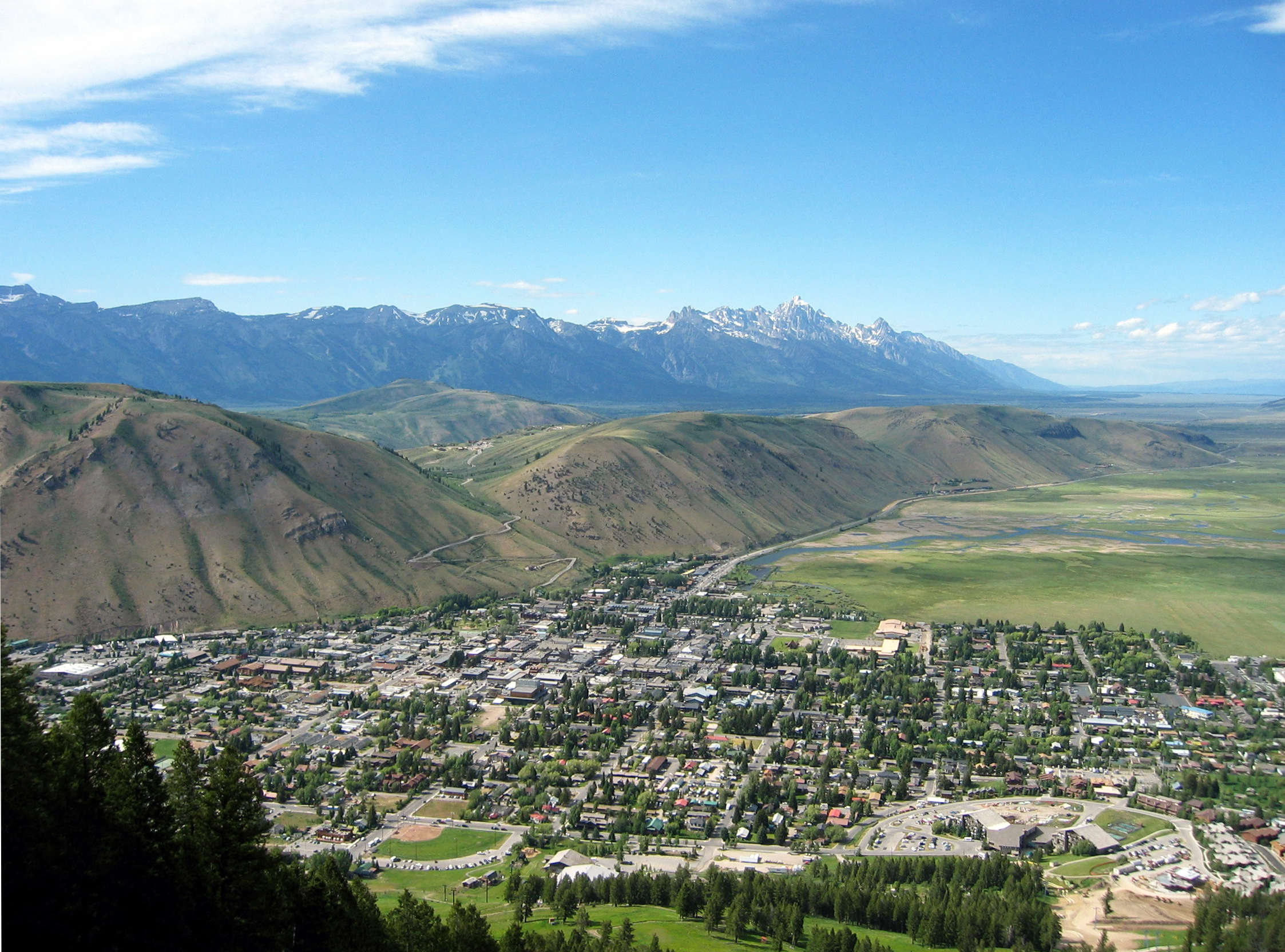
  The town of Jackson with the Teton Range in background
  - Jackson, Wyoming
  - Jackson Hole Airport
- Highways
  - John D. Rockefeller Jr. Memorial Parkway - Connects Grand Teton National Park and Yellowstone
  - U.S. Route 26 - Eastern entrance, Southern entrance
  - U.S. Route 89 - Northern entrance, Southern entrance
  - U.S. Route 191 - Western entrance, Southern entrance
  - U.S. Route 287 - Eastern entrance, Northern entrance
