= Dry Ridge (disambiguation) =

Dry Ridge may refer to:

- Dry Ridge, Kentucky, a home rule-class city[1] in Grant County
- Dry Ridge, Ohio, a census-designated place (CDP) in Hamilton County
- Dry Ridge Mountain, in Wyoming
