= Littles Peak =

Mountain in the state of Wyoming

- Location within Wyoming Location within the United States

Highest point
- Elevation: 10,717 ft (3,267 m)
- Prominence: 312 ft (95 m)
- Coordinates: 43°48′22″N 110°52′13″W

Geography
- Location: Grand Teton National Park, Caribou-Targhee National Forest, Teton County, Wyoming, U.S.
- Parent range: Teton Range
- Topo map: USGS Mount Moran

Littles Peak (10,717 feet (3,267 m) is located in the Teton Range in the U.S. state of Wyoming. The peak is on the border of Grand Teton National Park and the Jedediah Smith Wilderness of Caribou-Targhee National Forest. Littles Peak is at the western end of Leigh Canyon.
