= Moose Mountain (Wyoming) =

Mountain in Wyoming, United States

- Location within Wyoming Location within the United States

Highest point
- Elevation: 10,059 ft (3,066 m)
- Prominence: 219 ft (67 m)
- Coordinates: 43°56′15″N 110°51′23″W

Geography
- Location: Grand Teton National Park, Caribou-Targhee National Forest, Teton County, Wyoming, U.S.
- Parent range: Teton Range
- Topo map: USGS Ranger Peak

Climbing
- Easiest route: Hike

Moose Mountain (10,059 feet (3,066 m) is located in the northern Teton Range in the U.S. state of Wyoming. The peak is on the border of Grand Teton National Park and the Jedediah Smith Wilderness of Caribou-Targhee National Forest. Moose Mountain is at the western end of Webb Canyon.
