= Table Mountain (Wyoming) =

Mountain in Wyoming, United States

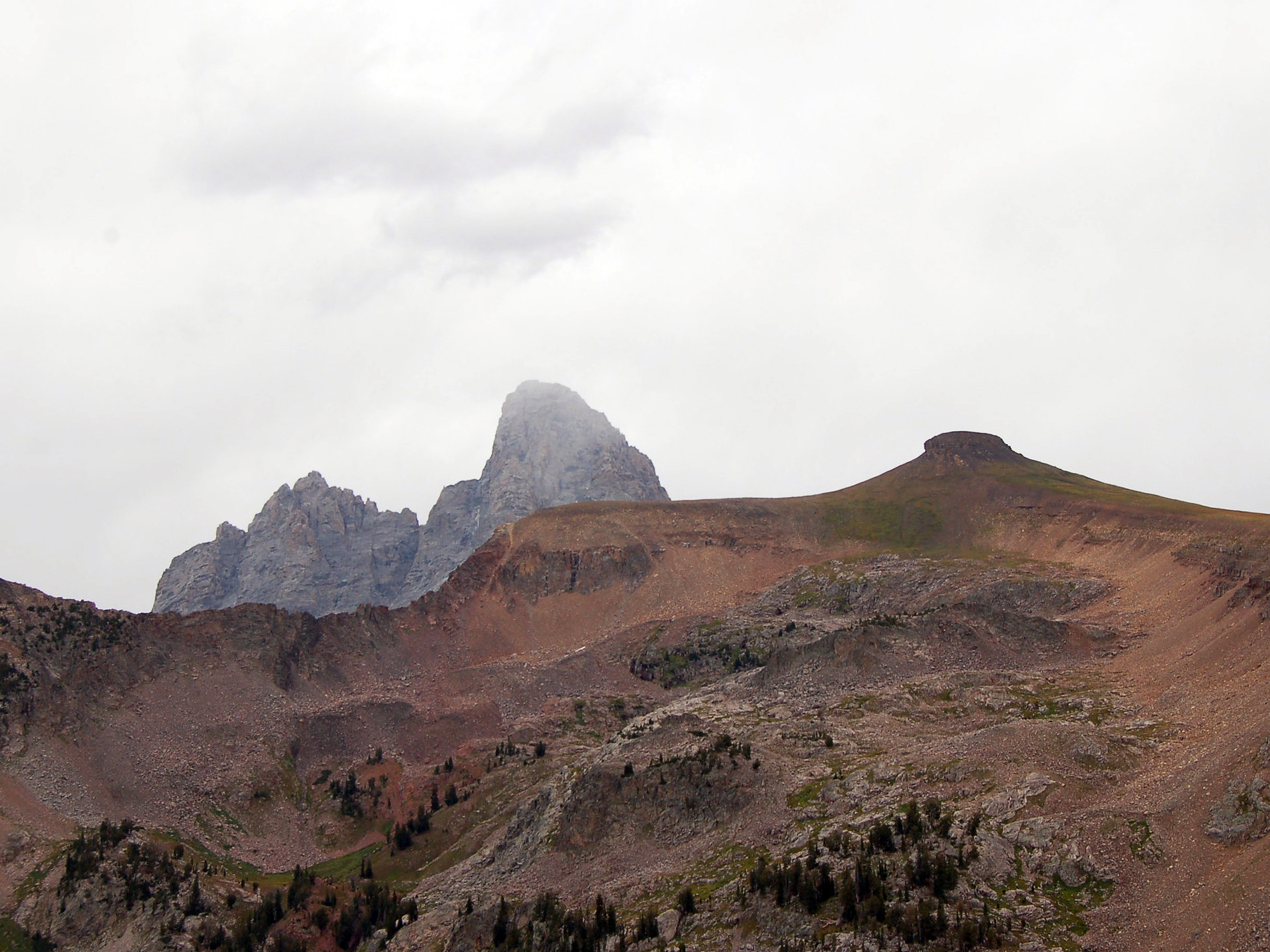
- Grand Teton and Table Mountain, August 2007

Highest point
- Elevation: 11,111 ft (3,387 m)
- Prominence: 946 ft (288 m)
- Coordinates: 43°44′48″N 110°51′07″W

Geography
- Location within Wyoming Location within the United States
- Location: Grand Teton National Park, Caribou-Targhee National Forest, Teton County, Wyoming, U.S.
- Parent range: Teton Range
- Topo map: USGS Grand Teton

Climbing
- First ascent: July 27, 1872 (William H. Jackson)
- Easiest route: Hike

Table Mountain (11,111 feet (3,387 m)) is located in the Teton Range in the U.S. state of Wyoming. The peak is on the border of Grand Teton National Park and the Jedediah Smith Wilderness of Caribou-Targhee National Forest. Table Mountain is west of the south fork of Cascade Canyon and a little more than 1 mile (1.6 km) north of Hurricane Pass. The peak is also locally known as "Table Rock".
