= Forget-me-not Lakes (Wyoming) =

- Location within Wyoming Location within the United States
- Location: Grand Teton National Park, Teton County, Wyoming, US
- Coordinates: 43°39′01″N 110°52′26″W
- Lake type: Glacial lake
- Basin countries: United States
- Max. length: 150 yd (140 m)
- Max. width: 180 yd (160 m)
- Surface elevation: 9,581 ft (2,920 m)

Forget-me-not Lakes is a high elevation ecosystem located in Grand Teton National Park, in the U. S. state of Wyoming. It is located 8.8 miles (14.2 km) from Moose Wilson Road, in Teton County, and situated 1 mile (1.6 km) west of Rimrock Lake and Prospectors Mountain. The lakes consist of several small bodies of water, the largest 150 yd (140 m) long and 180 yd (160 m) wide. Death Creek has 24 tributary streams, several of which originate from Death Shelf springs; two tributaries originate from Forget-Me-Not Lakes, elevation 9,600 feet (2,900 m) and Rimrock Lake 9,915 feet (3,022 m) and are located in a remote area near the head of Death Canyon on the slopes of Prospectors Mountain.

Backpacker magazine has referred to the Forget-me-not Lakes as a romantic place known for the abundance of wildflowers in the Spring and listed them as one of the recommended backcountry lakes worth a visit in Grand Teton National Park.

== See also ==
- Lakes of Grand Teton National Park
