= Red Mountain (Wyoming) =

Mountain in Wyoming, USA

- Location within Wyoming Location within the United States

Highest point
- Elevation: 10,182 ft (3,103 m)
- Prominence: 297 ft (91 m)
- Coordinates: 43°58′42″N 110°52′18″W

Geography
- Location: Grand Teton National Park, Caribou-Targhee National Forest, Teton County, Wyoming, U.S.
- Parent range: Teton Range
- Topo map: USGS Ranger Peak

Climbing
- Easiest route: Hike

Red Mountain (10,182 ft (3,103 m)) is located in the northern Teton Range in the U.S. state of Wyoming. The peak is on the border of Grand Teton National Park and the Jedediah Smith Wilderness of Caribou-Targhee National Forest.
