= The Jaw =

Mountain in United States of America

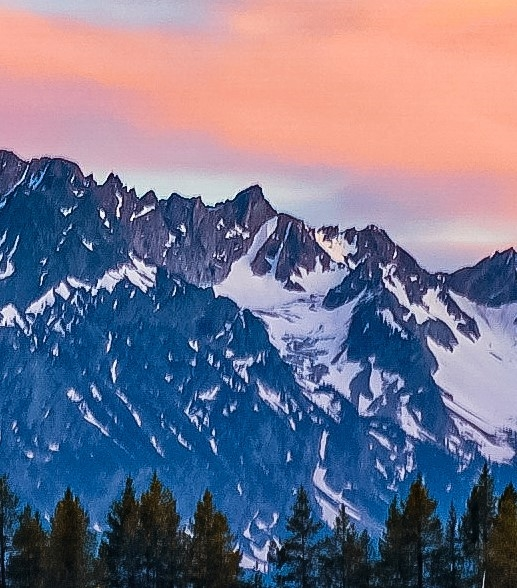
- Northeast aspect centered on skyline

Highest point
- Elevation: 11,405 ft (3,476 m)
- Prominence: 280 ft (85 m)
- Coordinates: 43°46′42″N 110°47′14″W

Geography
- Location within Wyoming Location within the United States
- Location: Grand Teton National Park, Teton County, Wyoming, U.S.
- Parent range: Teton Range
- Topo map: USGS Mount Moran

The Jaw (11,405 feet (3,476 m)) is a mountain located in the Teton Range, Grand Teton National Park in the U.S. state of Wyoming. The Jaw is .50 miles (0.80 km) west-northwest of Rock of Ages and .75 miles (1.21 km) west-southwest of Mount Saint John. The summit is at the head of Hanging Canyon.
