= Rock of Ages (Wyoming) =

Mountain in Wyoming, United States

- Location within Wyoming Location within the United States

Highest point
- Elevation: 10,900 ft (3,300 m)
- Prominence: 415 ft (126 m)
- Coordinates: 43°46′27″N 110°46′43″W

Geography
- Location: Grand Teton National Park, Teton County, Wyoming, U.S.
- Parent range: Teton Range
- Topo map: USGS Mount Moran

Climbing
- First ascent: 1932 (Fred and Irene Ayers)

Rock of Ages (10,900 feet (3,300 m)) is located in the Teton Range, Grand Teton National Park in the U.S. state of Wyoming. Rock of Ages is .50 miles (0.80 km) ESE of The Jaw and on the south side of Hanging Canyon.

The first ascent was accomplished on August 14th, 1934 by Fred and Irene Ayres.
