= Green Lakes Mountain =

Mountain in the state of Wyoming

- Location within Wyoming Location within the United States

Highest point
- Elevation: 10,240 ft (3,120 m)
- Coordinates: 43°51′46″N 110°52′42″W

Geography
- Location: Grand Teton National Park, Caribou-Targhee National Forest, Teton County, Wyoming, U.S.
- Parent range: Teton Range
- Topo map: USGS Granite Basin

Climbing
- Easiest route: Hike

Green Lakes Mountain (10,240 feet (3,120 m) is located in the Teton Range in the U.S. state of Wyoming. The peak is on the border of Grand Teton National Park and the Jedediah Smith Wilderness of Caribou-Targhee National Forest. Green Lakes Mountain is at the head of Moran Canyon and 1 mile (1.6 km) SSW of Dry Ridge Mountain.
