= Ribbon Cascade (Teton County, Wyoming) =

- Location within Wyoming
- Location: Grand Teton National Park, United States
- Coordinates: 43.774655°N 110.748268°W
- Type: Cascade
- Total height: 600 feet (180 m)
- Watercourse: Intermittent stream

Ribbon Cascade is located in Hanging Canyon, Grand Teton National Park in the U.S. state of Wyoming. The cascade drops approximately 600 feet (180 m) near the eastern end of Hanging Canyon, and west of Jenny Lake. Fed by an unnamed intermittent stream, the peak time for waterflow through the cascade is during spring snowmelt. However, the Ribbon Cascade is rarely dry as it is the only discharge for the Lake of the Crags, Ramshead Lake and Arrowhead Pool. There are no maintained trails to the cascade, though it can be seen during peak waterflow from the east shore of Jenny Lake, just to the north of Cascade Canyon.
