= The Wall (mountain) =

Mountain in Wyoming

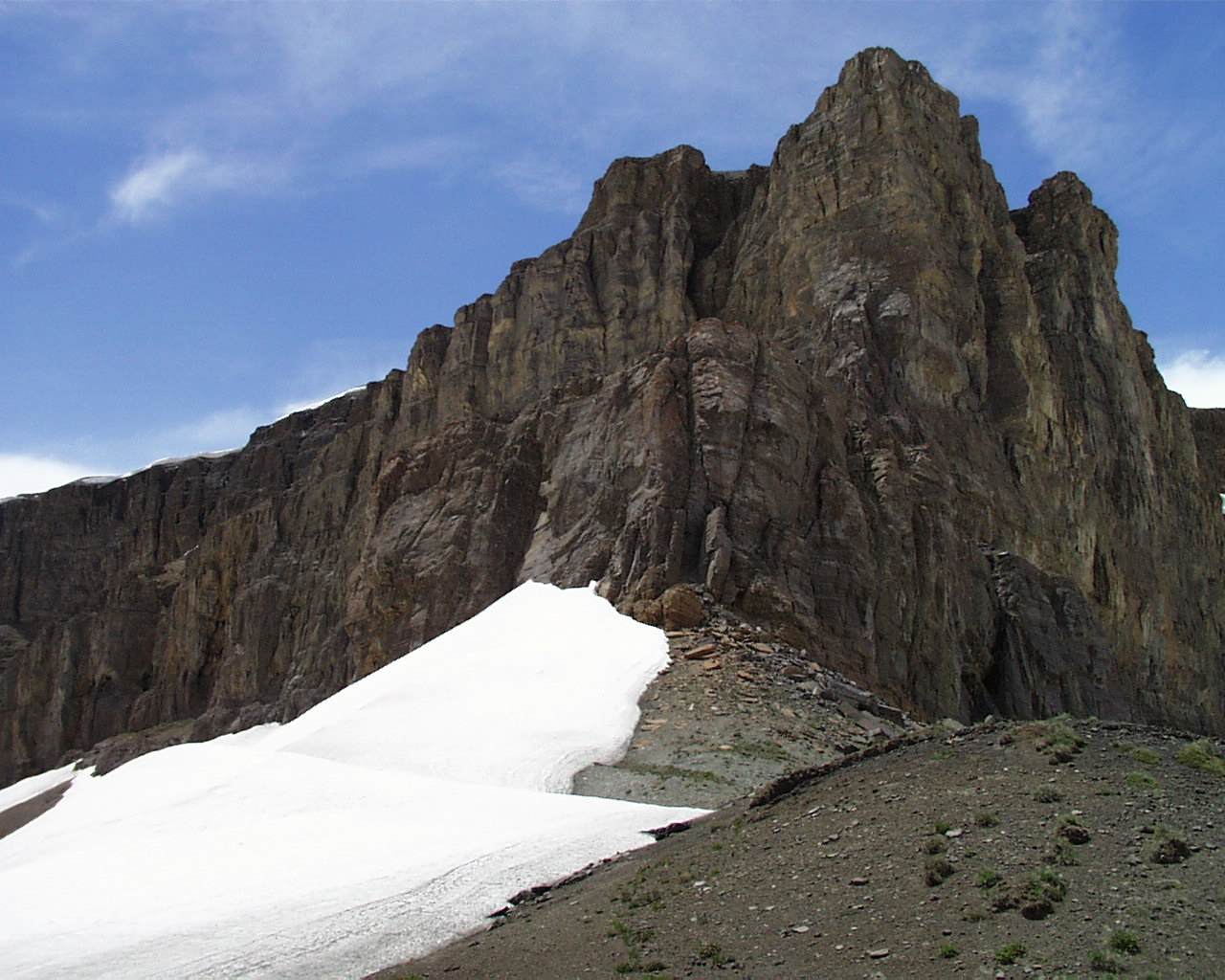

Highest point
- Elevation: 11,113 ft (3,387 m)
- Prominence: 388 ft (118 m)
- Coordinates: 43°52′59″N 110°50′17″W

Geography
- Location within Wyoming Location within the United States
- Location: Grand Teton National Park, Caribou-Targhee National Forest, Teton County, Wyoming, U.S.
- Parent range: Teton Range
- Topo map: USGS Grand Teton

Climbing
- Easiest route: Scramble

The Wall (11,113 feet (3,387 m)) is located in the Teton Range in the U.S. state of Wyoming, running for more than 4 miles (6.4 km) along the western border of Grand Teton National Park. The peak is on the border of Grand Teton National Park and the Jedediah Smith Wilderness of Caribou-Targhee National Forest. This high point, near the northern terminus of the cliff, is 1 mile (1.6 km) WSW of South Teton and overlooks Snowdrift Lake.
