= List of mammals of Grand Teton National Park =

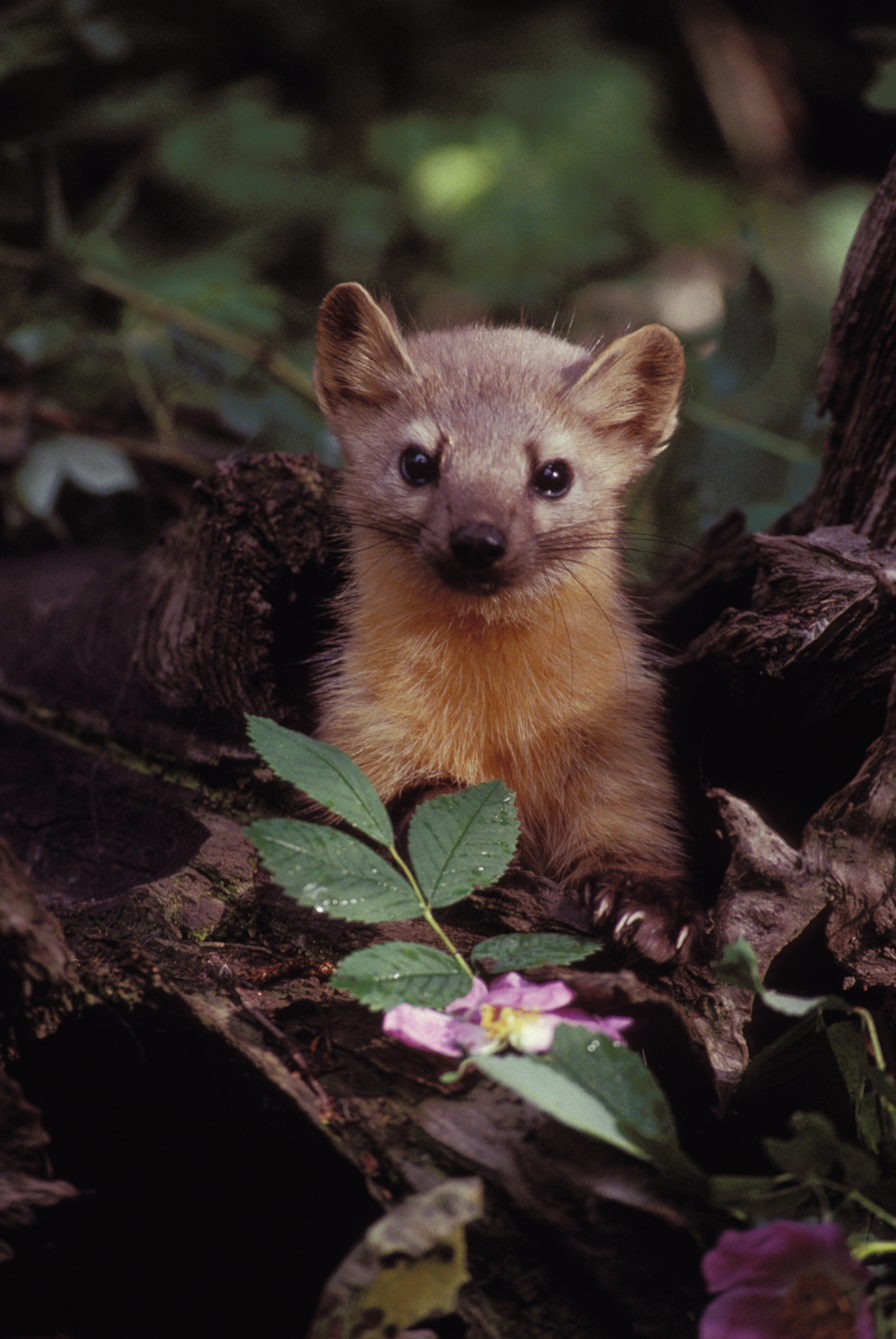
Pacific marten

There are at least 16 large and 45 small mammal species known to occur in Grand Teton National Park, an American national park in northwestern Wyoming. Species are listed by common name, scientific name, and relative abundance.

== Legend ==
- a – Abundant – likely to be seen in appropriate habitat and season
- c – Common – frequently seen in appropriate habitat and season
- u – Uncommon – seen irregularly in appropriate habitat and season
- r – Rare – unexpected even in appropriate habitat and season
- x – Accidental – out of known range, or reported only once or twice

== Large mammals ==
=== Bears ===
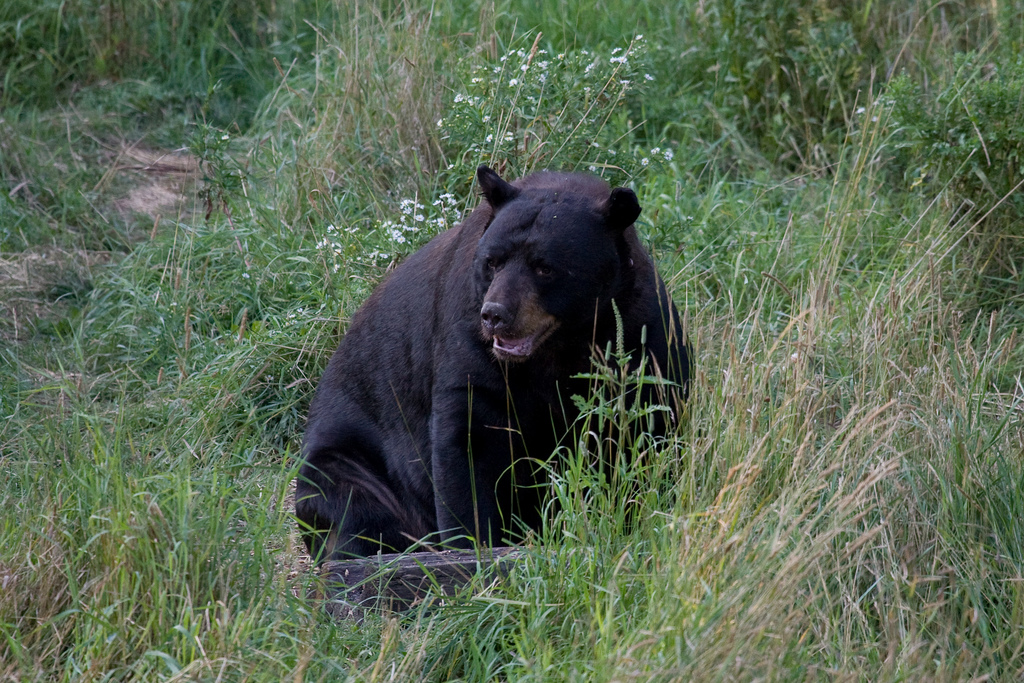
Black bear

Order: Carnivora, Family: Ursidae

- Black bear, Ursus americanus, c
- Brown bear, Ursus arctos u
  - Grizzly bear, U. a. horribilis, u

=== Canines ===
Order: Carnivora, Family: Canidae

- Coyote, Canis latrans, a
- Gray wolf, Canis lupus u
  - Northwestern wolf, C. l. occidentalis, u
- Red fox, Vulpes vulpes, r

=== Felines ===
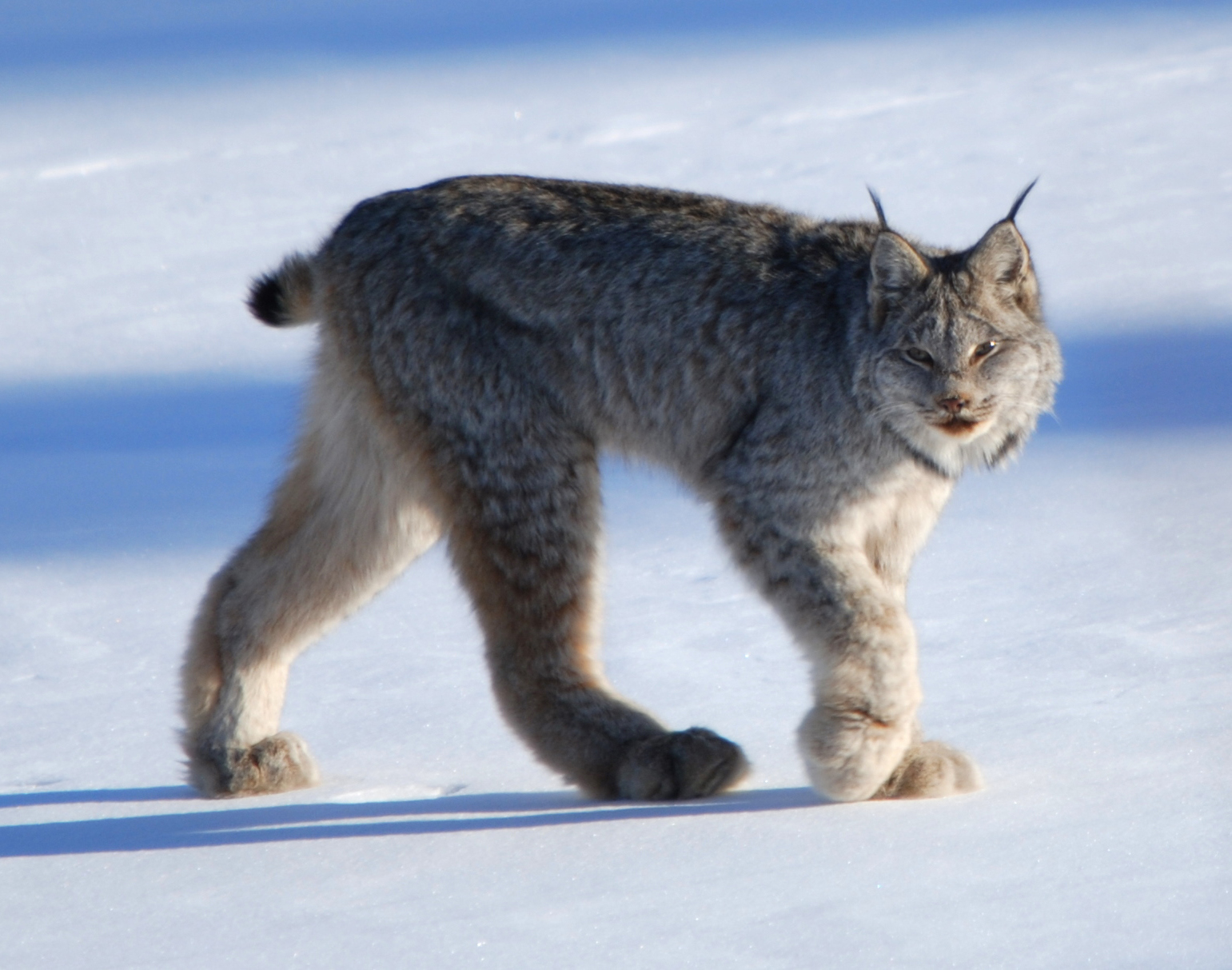
Canada lynx

Order: Carnivora, Family: Felidae

- Canada lynx, Lynx canadensis, r
- Bobcat, Lynx rufus, r
- Cougar, Puma concolor, r

=== Deer ===
Order: Artiodactyla, Family: Cervidae

- Moose, Alces alces, a
- Elk (wapiti), Cervus canadensis, a
- Mule deer, Odocoileus hemionus, c
- White-tailed deer, Odocoileus virginianus, r

=== Pronghorn ===
Order: Artiodactyla, Family: Antilocapridae

- Pronghorn, Antilocapra americana, c

=== Cattle ===
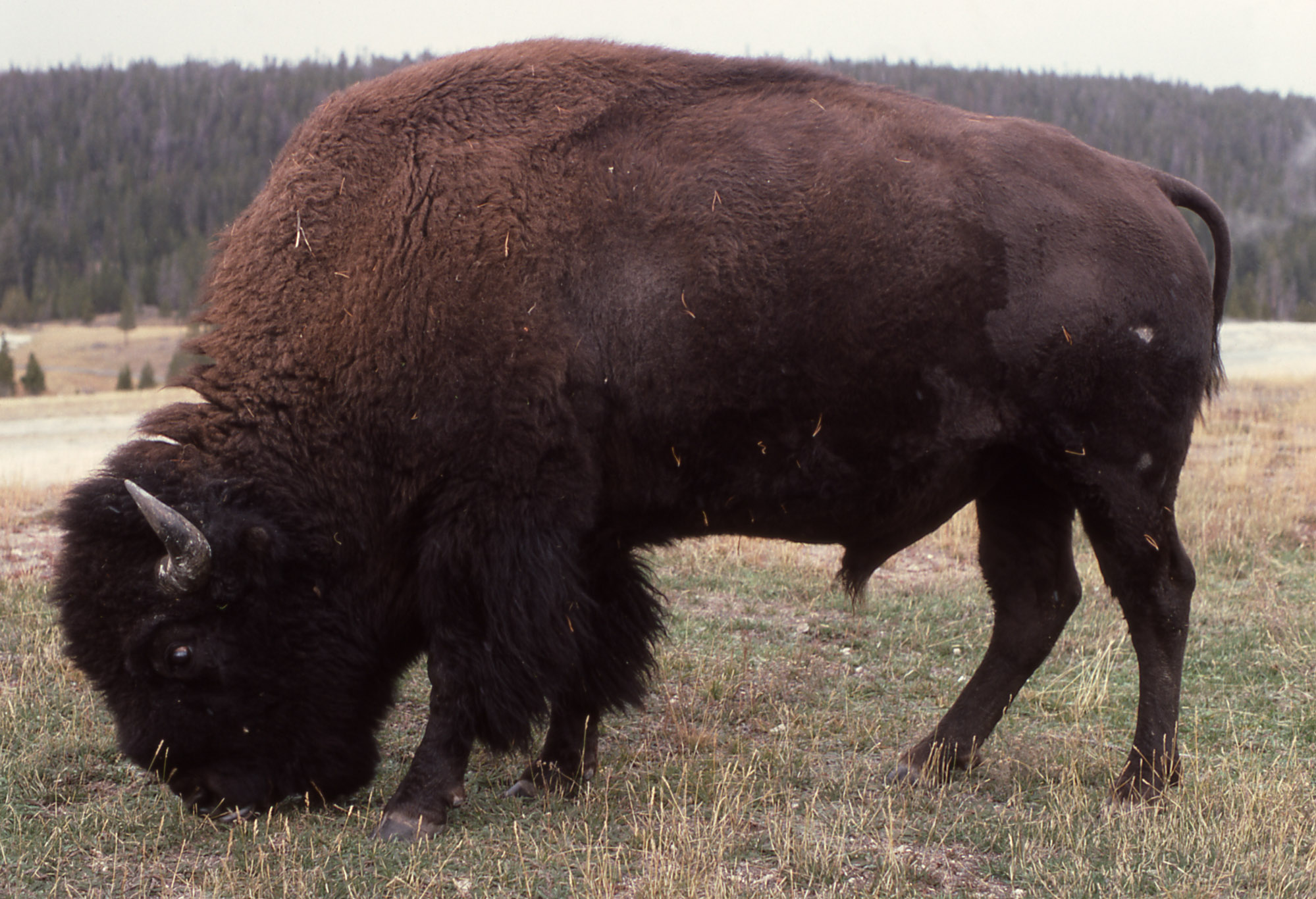
American bison

Order: Artiodactyla, Family: Bovidae

- Bison, Bison bison, c
- Mountain goat, Oreamnos americanus, x
- Bighorn sheep, Ovis canadensis, u

== Small mammals ==
=== Raccoons ===
Order: Carnivora, Family: Procyonidae

- Raccoon, Procyon lotor, r

=== Badgers and weasels ===
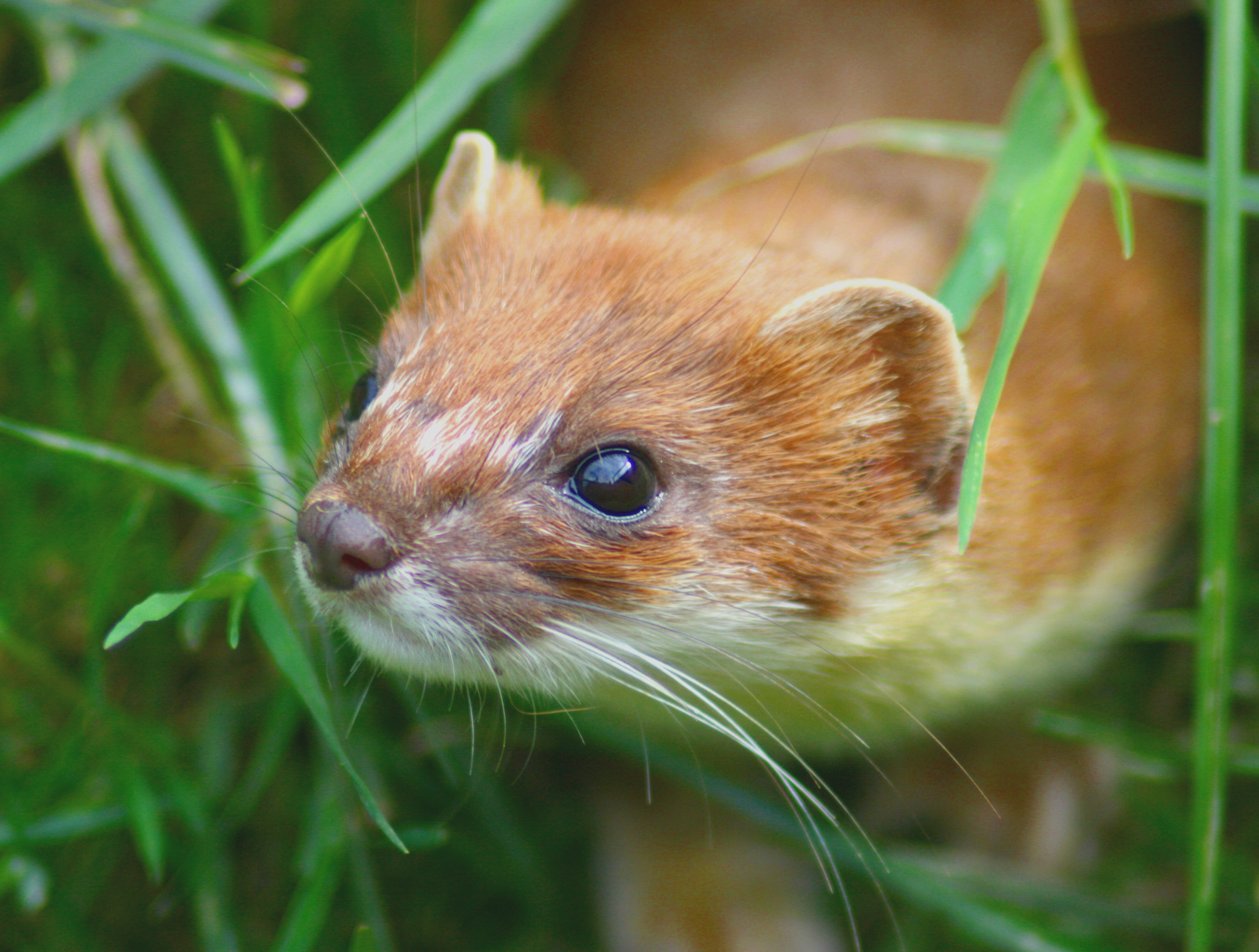
Short-tailed weasel

Order: Carnivora, Family: Mustelidae

- Wolverine, Gulo gulo, alpine, r
- North American river otter, Lontra canadensis, c
- Pacific marten, Martes caurina, c
- Least weasel, Mustela nivalis, r
- Short-tailed weasel, Mustela richardsonii, u
- Long-tailed weasel, Neogale frenata, c
- American mink, Neogale vison, riparian forests, u
- American badger, Taxidea taxus, c

=== Skunks ===
Order: Carnivora, Family: Mephitidae

- Striped skunk, Mephitis mephitis, u

=== Hares and rabbits ===
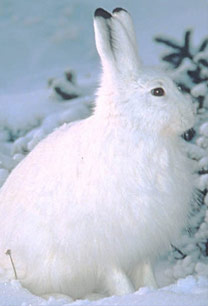
Snowshoe hare

Order: Lagomorpha, Family: Leporidae

- Snowshoe hare, Lepus americanus, c
- White-tailed jackrabbit, Lepus townsendii, u

=== Pikas ===
Order: Lagomorpha, Family: Ochotonidae

- American pika, Ochotona princeps, c

=== Shrews ===
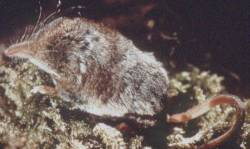
Masked shrew

Order: Soricomorpha, Family: Soricidae

- Masked shrew, Sorex cinereus, c
- Dwarf shrew, Sorex nanus, r
- American water shrew, Sorex palustris, u
- Vagrant shrew, Sorex vagrans, c

=== Beaver ===
Order: Rodentia, Family: Castoridae

- Beaver, Castor canadensis, a

=== Squirrels ===
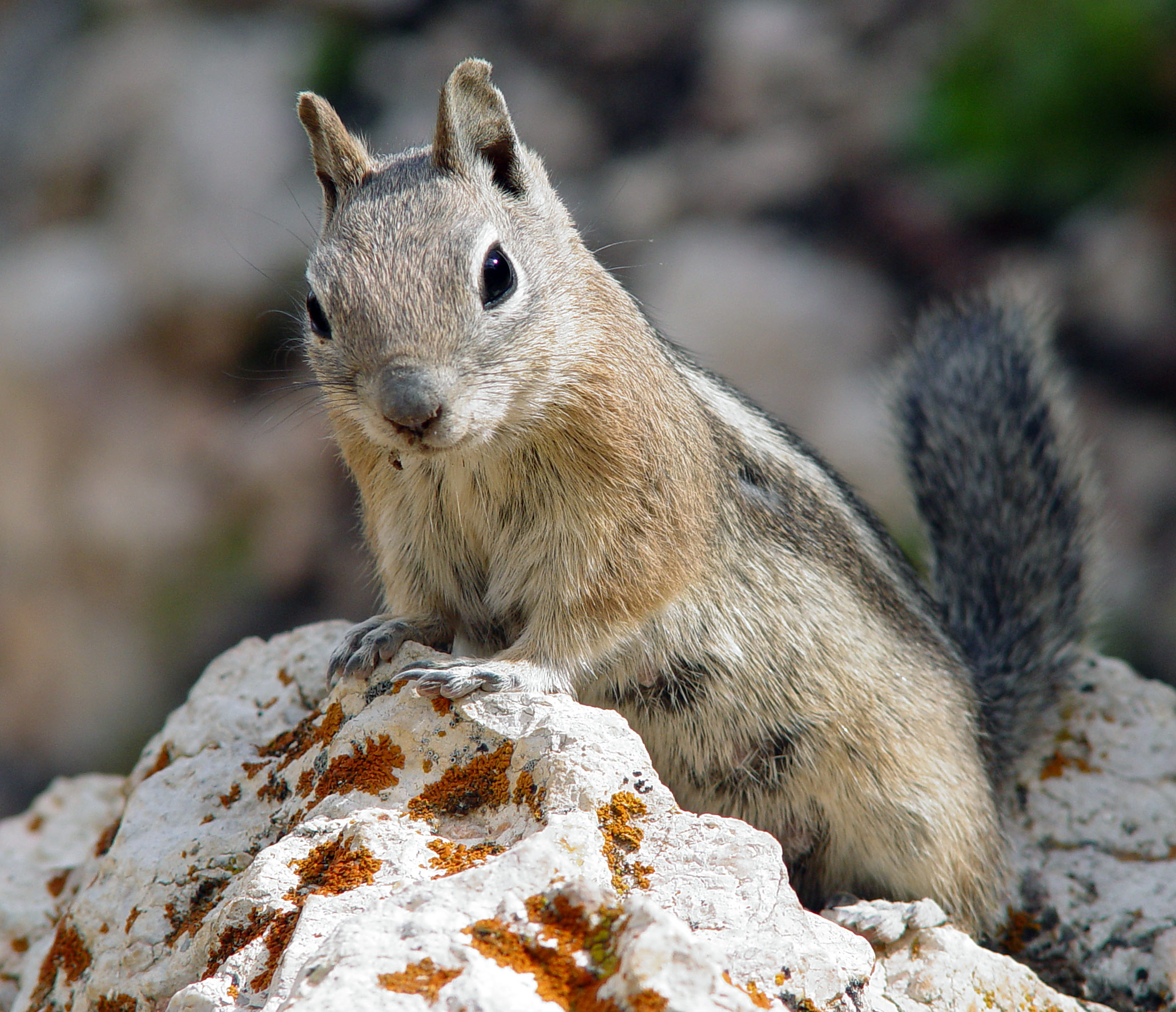
Golden-mantled ground squirrel

Order: Rodentia, Family: Sciuridae

- Least chipmunk, Tamias minimus, a
- Uinta chipmunk, Tamias umbrinus, u
- Yellow-pine chipmunk, Tamias amoenus, c
- Yellow-bellied marmot, Marmota flaviventris, c
- Golden-mantled ground squirrel, Spermophilus lateralis, c
- Northern flying squirrel, Glaucomys sabrinus, u
- American red squirrel, Tamiasciurus hudsonicus, a
- Uinta ground squirrel, Spermophilus armatus, a

=== Pocket gophers ===
Order: Rodentia, Family: Geomyidae

- Northern pocket gopher, Thomomys talpoides, u

=== Mice ===
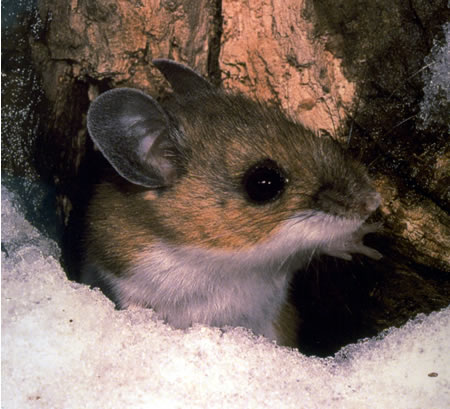
Deer mouse

Order: Rodentia, Family: Cricetidae

- Deer mouse, Peromyscus maniculatus, a

=== Jumping mice ===
Order: Rodentia, Family: Dipodidae

- Western jumping mouse, Zapus princeps, c

=== Muskrats, voles and woodrats ===
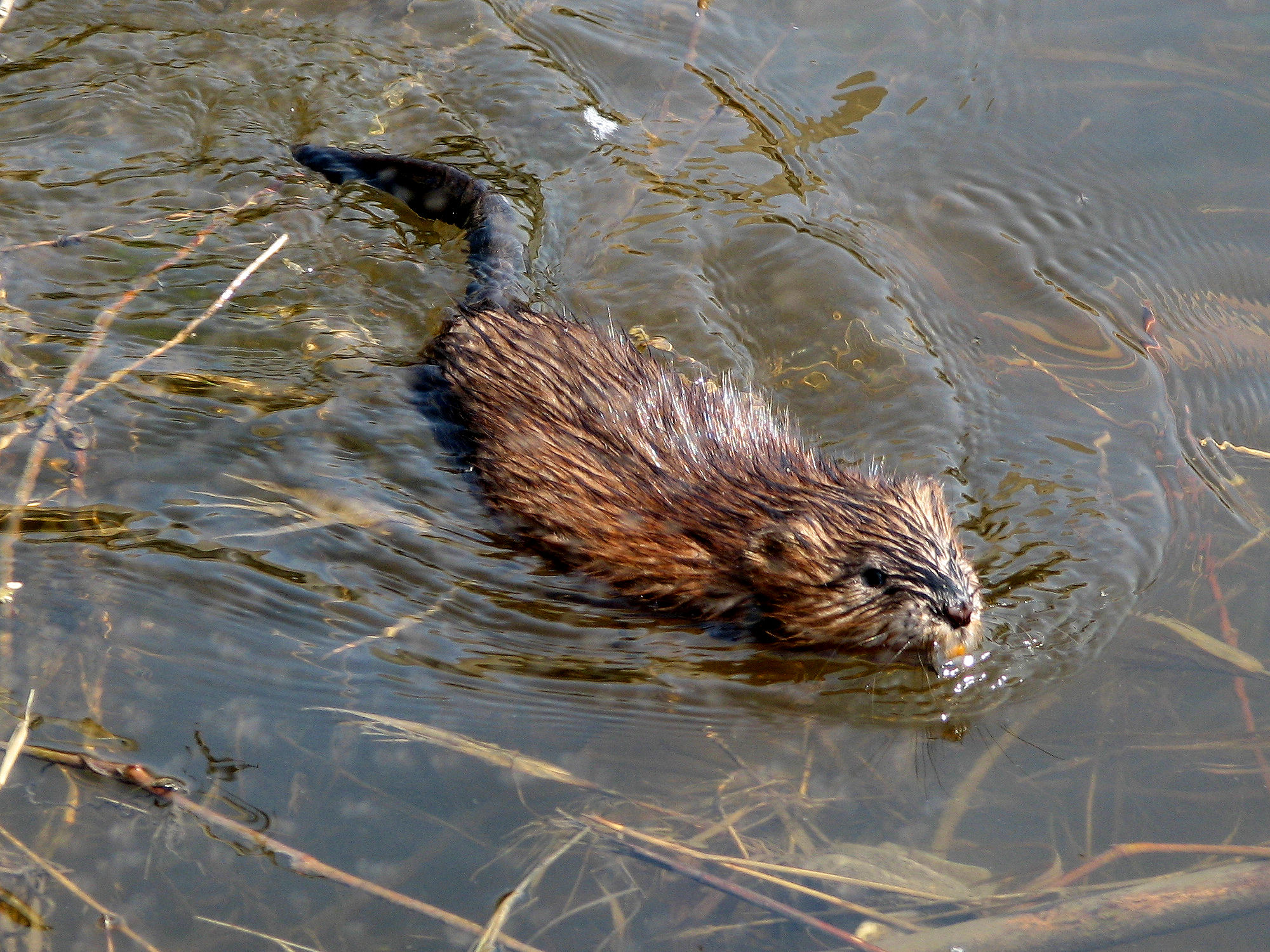
Muskrat

Order: Rodentia, Family: Cricetidae

- Muskrat, Ondatra zibethicus, c
- Western heather vole, Phenacomys intermedius, c
- Long-tailed vole, Microtus longicaudus, u
- Meadow vole, Microtus pennsylvanicus, a
- Montane vole, Microtus montanus, a
- Sagebrush vole, Lemmiscus curtatus, r
- Southern red-backed vole, Myodes gapperi, c
- Water vole, Microtus richardsoni, c
- Bushy-tailed woodrat, Neotoma cinerea, u

=== Porcupines ===
Order: Rodentia, Family: Erethizontidae

- North American porcupine, Erethizon dorsatum, c

=== Bats ===
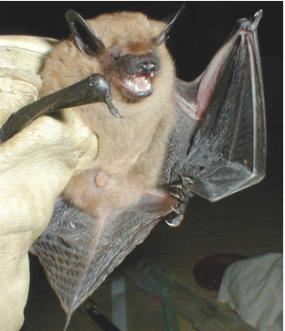
Big brown bat

Order: Chiroptera, Family: Vespertilionidae

- Big brown bat, Eptesicus fuscus, u
- Hoary bat, Lasiurus cinereus, u
- Little brown bat, Myotis lucifugus, c
- Long-eared bat, Myotis evotis, u
- Long-legged bat, Myotis volans, u
- Silver-haired bat, Lasionycteris noctivagans, u

== See also ==
- Animals of Yellowstone
- Small mammals of Yellowstone National Park
