= Mount Bannon =

Mountain in Wyoming, United States

- Location within Wyoming Location within the United States

Highest point
- Elevation: 10,971 ft (3,344 m)
- Prominence: 1,206 ft (368 m)
- Coordinates: 43°40′18″N 110°54′28″W

Geography
- Location: Grand Teton National Park and Caribou-Targhee National Forest, Teton County, Wyoming, U.S.
- Parent range: Teton Range
- Topo map: USGS Mount Bannon

Climbing
- Easiest route: Scramble

Mount Bannon (10,971 feet (3,344 m)) is located in the Teton Range, on the border of Caribou-Targhee National Forest and Grand Teton National Park in the U.S. state of Wyoming. The peak is named for Thomas M Bannon and rises to the west above Death Canyon.
