= Symmetry Spire =

Mountain in the state of Wyoming

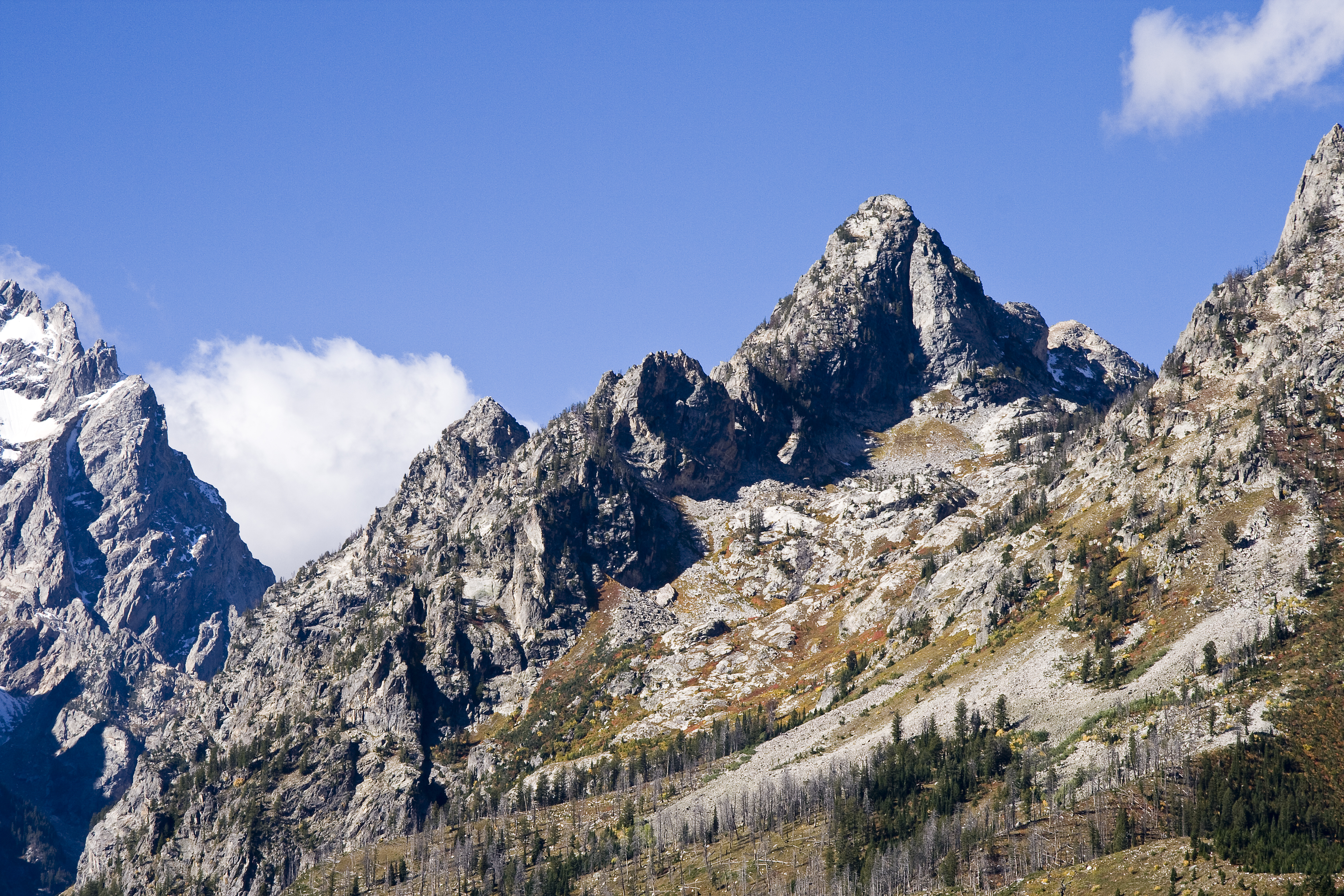
- Symmetry Spire at center right and Storm Point center left

Highest point
- Elevation: 10,565–10,645 ft (3,220–3,245 m)
- Prominence: 320
- Coordinates: 43°46′25″N 110°45′56″W

Geography
- Location within Wyoming Location within the United States
- Location: Grand Teton National Park, Teton County, Wyoming, U.S.
- Parent range: Teton Range
- Topo map: USGS Mount Moran

Climbing
- First ascent: Fryxell/Smith 1929
- Easiest route: Scramble/Technical class 4 to 5.8

Symmetry Spire (10,565–10,645 feet (3,220–3,245 m)) is located in the Teton Range, Grand Teton National Park in the U.S. state of Wyoming. The mountain, first climbed via the east ridge route on August 20, 1929, by Fritiof Fryxell and Phil Smith, towers above the northwest shore of Jenny Lake and Cascade Canyon. The scenic Lake of the Crags, a cirque lake or tarn, is located northwest of the summit and is accessed by way of Hanging Canyon. Popular with mountaineers, the spire has numerous challenging cliffs.

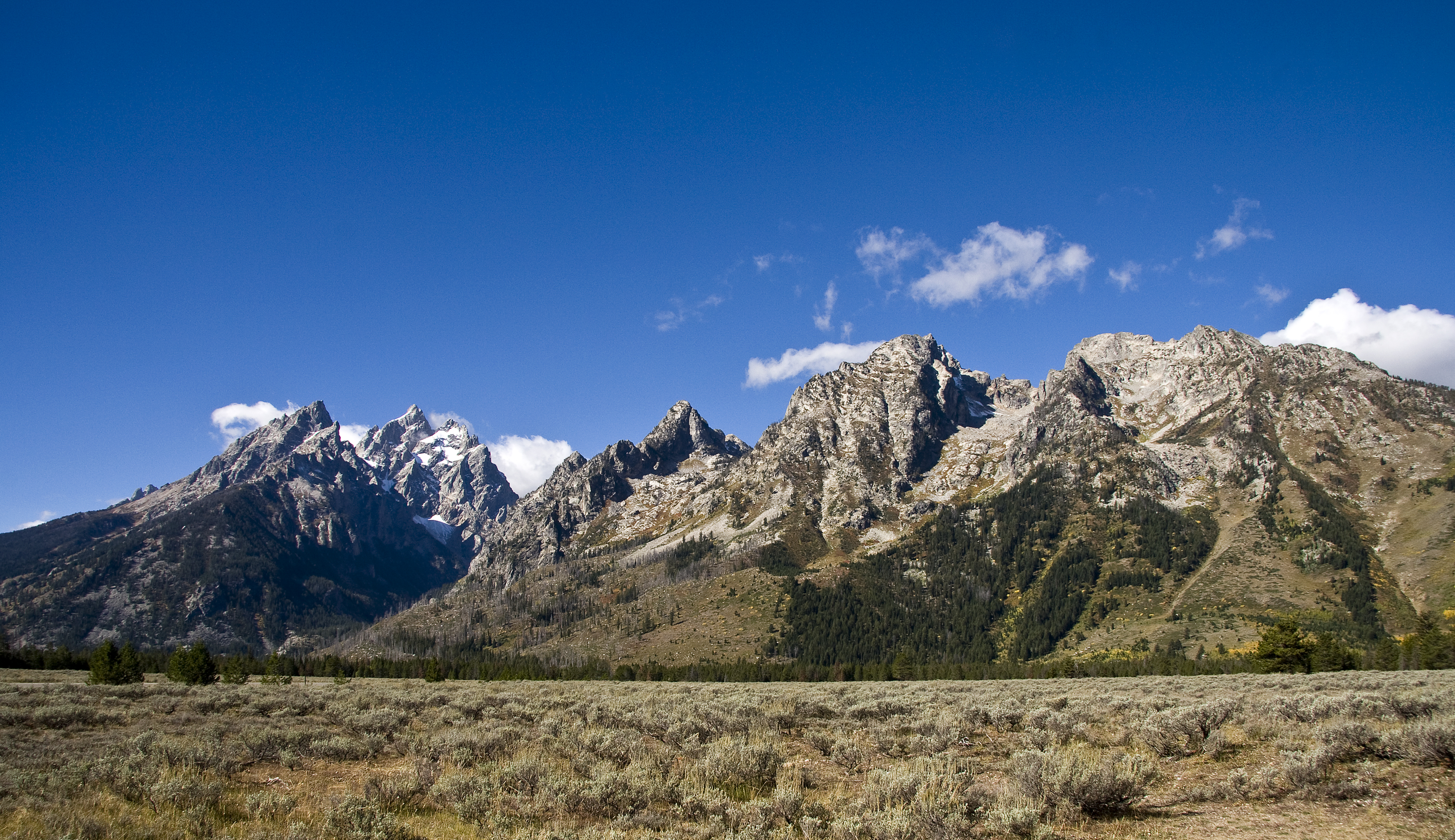
Teton Range left to right with the Cathedral Group, Cascade Canyon, Symmetry Spire, Mount Saint John and Rockchuck Peak
