= Grace and Robert Miller Ranch =

- Miller, Grace and Robert, Ranch (Boundary Increase)
- U.S. National Register of Historic Places
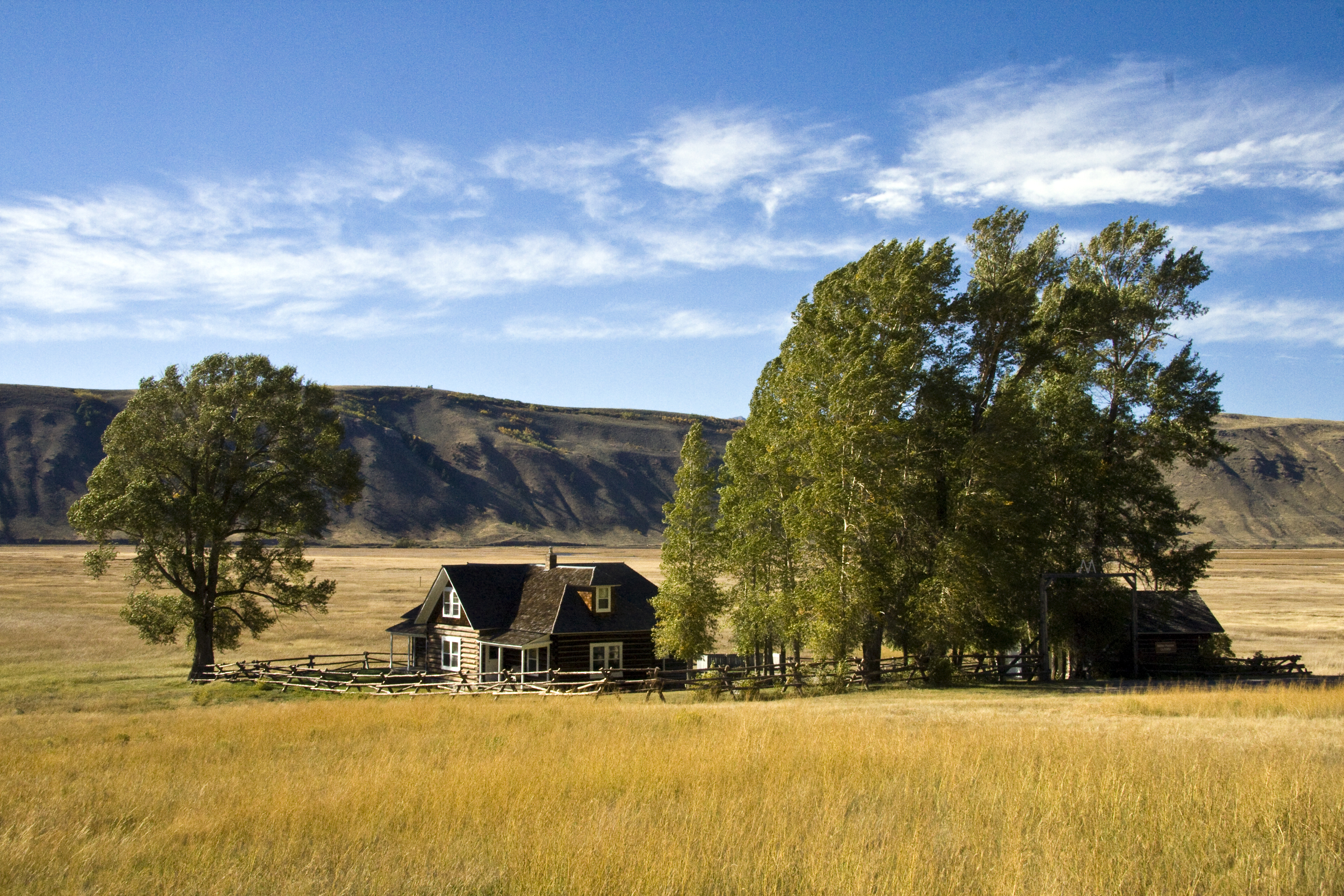

- Location within Wyoming Location within the United States
- Location: Jackson Hole, Teton County, 1 mi. NE of Jackson, Jackson, Wyoming
- Coordinates: 43°29′22″N 110°44′12″W
- Built: 1898
- NRHP reference No.: 01001454
- Added to NRHP: January 11, 2002

The Grace and Robert Miller Ranch represents an expansion of the previously existing Miller Cabin listing on the National Register of Historic Places. The ranch was the home of Robert E. Miller, first superintendent of Jackson Hole National Monument. The property was transferred to the U.S. Fish and Wildlife Service as part of the National Elk Refuge.
