= Dry Ridge Mountain =

Mountain in the state of Wyoming

- Location within Wyoming Location within the United States

Highest point
- Elevation: 10,326 ft (3,147 m)
- Coordinates: 43°52′29″N 110°52′19″W

Geography
- Location: Grand Teton National Park, Caribou-Targhee National Forest, Teton County, Wyoming, U.S.
- Parent range: Teton Range
- Topo map: USGS Mount Moran

Climbing
- Easiest route: Hike

Dry Ridge Mountain (10,326 feet (3,147 m) is located in the Teton Range in the U.S. state of Wyoming. The peak is on the border of Grand Teton National Park and the Jedediah Smith Wilderness of Caribou-Targhee National Forest. Dry Ridge Mountain is at the head of Moran Canyon and 1 mile (1.6 km) NNE of Green Lakes Mountain.
