= Maidenform Peak =

Mountain in the state of Wyoming

- Location within Wyoming Location within the United States

Highest point
- Elevation: 11,142 ft (3,396 m)
- Prominence: 1,057 ft (322 m)
- Coordinates: 43°49′30″N 110°51′05″W

Geography
- Location: Grand Teton National Park, Teton County, Wyoming, U.S.
- Parent range: Teton Range
- Topo map: USGS Mount Moran

Climbing
- Easiest route: Hike/Scramble

Maidenform Peak (11,142 feet (3,396 m) is located in the Teton Range, Grand Teton National Park in the U.S. state of Wyoming. Maidenform Peak is at the head of Leigh Canyon and .64 miles (1.03 km) SSW of Cleaver Peak. Cirque Lake is immediately east of the peak.
