= Cleaver Peak =

Mountain in the state of Wyoming

- Location within Wyoming Location within the United States

Highest point
- Elevation: 11,060 ft (3,370 m)
- Prominence: 335 ft (102 m)
- Coordinates: 43°50′07″N 110°50′50″W

Geography
- Location: Grand Teton National Park, Teton County, Wyoming, U.S.
- Parent range: Teton Range
- Topo map: USGS Mount Moran

Climbing
- Easiest route: class 3

Cleaver Peak (11,060 feet (3,370 m) is located in the Teton Range, Grand Teton National Park in the U.S. state of Wyoming. Cleaver Peak is .64 miles (1.03 km) to the NNE of Maidenform Peak. Cirque Lake is immediately east of the peak.
