= Elk Ranch Reservoir =

- Location within Wyoming
- Location: Grand Teton National Park, Teton County, Wyoming, US
- Coordinates: 43°48′20″N 110°28′24″W
- Type: Reservoir
- Basin countries: United States
- Max. length: .65 mi (1.05 km)
- Max. width: .25 mi (0.40 km)
- Surface elevation: 6,860 ft (2,090 m)

Elk Ranch Reservoir is located in Grand Teton National Park, in the U. S. state of Wyoming. Elk Ranch Reservoir is in the eastern section of the park and is impounded by the Uhl Dam, which is an 800-foot-long (240 m) earth-filled dam constructed in the 1940s on land later acquired and incorporated into Grand Teton National Park.
