= Window Peak =

Mountain in the state of Wyoming

- Location within Wyoming Location within the United States

Highest point
- Elevation: 10,508 ft (3,203 m)
- Prominence: 668 ft (204 m)
- Coordinates: 43°51′23″N 110°51′14″W

Geography
- Location: Grand Teton National Park, Teton County, Wyoming, U.S.
- Parent range: Teton Range
- Topo map: USGS Mount Moran

Climbing
- Easiest route: Scramble

Window Peak (10,508 feet (3,203 m)) is located in the Teton Range, Grand Teton National Park in the U.S. state of Wyoming. The peak is in the western reaches of Moran Canyon.
