= Miller Cabin =

Historic house in Wyoming, United States

Coordinates: 43°29′20″N 110°44′16″W

- U.S. National Register of Historic Places
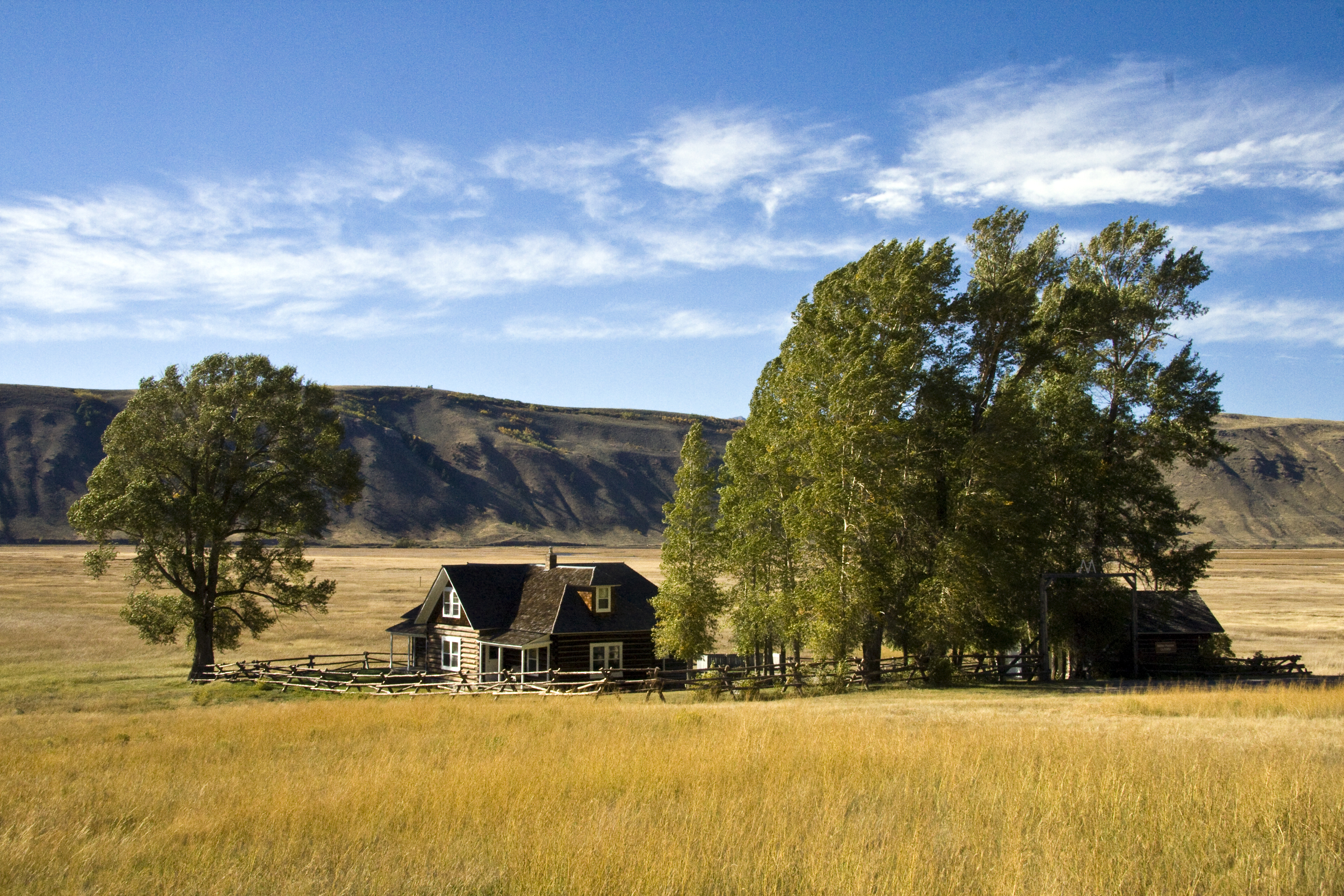

- Location within Wyoming Location within the United States
- Location: Jackson Hole, Teton County, Wyoming, USA
- Nearest city: Jackson, Wyoming
- Built: 1895–98
- Architect: Robert A. Miller
- NRHP reference No.: 69000195
- Added to NRHP: April 16, 1969

The Miller Cabin complex consists of three buildings that were the residence of Robert A. Miller, the first superintendent of Teton National Monument. A house, a barn and a cabin built by the U.S. Forest Service are included. The property was eventually transferred to the U.S. Fish and Wildlife Service in what became the National Elk Refuge. The buildings are a component of the closely related Grace and Robert Miller Ranch.

Robert Miller was born in Wisconsin in 1863. He took up permanent residence in Jackson Hole in 1885, settling on land along Flat Creek. A prominent local citizen, Miller helped to organize the town of Jackson, Wyoming in 1901 and was president of the local bank. His wife served two terms as mayor of Jackson in the 1920s. Miller was chosen by Abraham Archibald Anderson, administrator of the new Yellowstone Timberland Reserve to be administrator of the Teton Division of the reserve from 1903, running the operation from his cabin.

As a result of local rancher, photographer and Wyoming legislator S.N. Leek's efforts, the National Elk Refuge was established in 1912 from nearly 2,000 acres (810 ha) of Miller's land, and was administered from the house adjoining Miller's cabin.

The original cabin was Miller's home during his time with the Forest Service. The adjoining two-story house was used as the headquarters for the National Elk Refuge in its early years.
