= Shadow Peak =

Mountain in the state of Wyoming

- Location within Wyoming Location within the United States

Highest point
- Elevation: 10,725 ft (3,269 m)
- Prominence: 165 ft (50 m)
- Coordinates: 43°42′54″N 110°47′36″W

Geography
- Location: Grand Teton National Park, Teton County, Wyoming, U.S.
- Parent range: Teton Range
- Topo map: USGS Grand Teton

Climbing
- Easiest route: Scramble

Shadow Peak (10,725 feet (3,269 m)) is located in the Teton Range, within Grand Teton National Park, U.S. state of Wyoming. Shadow Peak is just southeast of Nez Perce Peak and rises to the north above Avalanche Canyon.
