= Forellen Peak =

Mountain in the state of Wyoming

- Location within Wyoming Location within the United States

Highest point
- Elevation: 9,777 ft (2,980 m)
- Prominence: 892
- Coordinates: 44°00′32″N 110°49′46″W

Naming
- English translation: Trouts Peak
- Language of name: German

Geography
- Location: Grand Teton National Park, Teton County, Wyoming, U.S.
- Parent range: Teton Range
- Topo map: USGS Survey Peak

Climbing
- Easiest route: Hike

Forellen Peak (9,777 feet (2,980 m)) is located in the Teton Range, Grand Teton National Park, in the U.S. state of Wyoming. The peak is in the northern section of the range, and rises abruptly more than 2,500 feet (760 m) above Owl Creek. Unlike the more impressive sections of the Teton Range to the south, Forellen Peak is subdued and the hike to the summit from the north is nontechnical, yet requires many miles of off-trail hiking. Access is best via the Berry Creek trail which can be reached by hiking south from the John D. Rockefeller, Jr. Memorial Parkway or by boat across the northern end of Jackson Lake.

Forelle(n) is a German word meaning "trout(s)".
