= Prospectors Mountain =

Mountain in Wyoming, United States

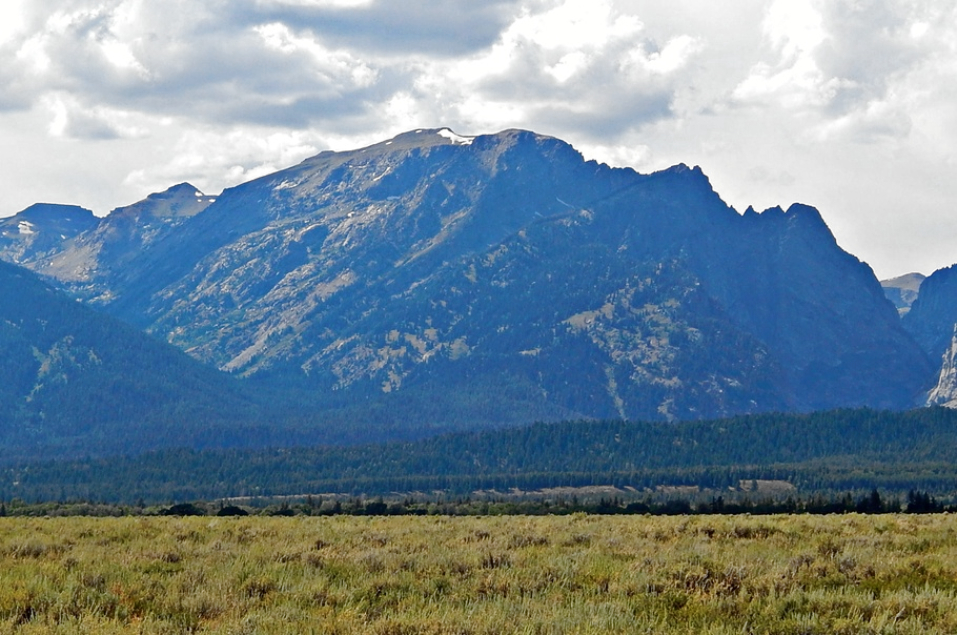

Highest point
- Elevation: 11,246 ft (3,428 m)
- Prominence: 1,681 ft (512 m)
- Coordinates: 43°38′58″N 110°50′58″W

Geography
- Location within Wyoming Location within the United States
- Location: Grand Teton National Park, Teton County, Wyoming, U.S.
- Parent range: Teton Range
- Topo map: USGS Grand Teton

Climbing
- Easiest route: Scramble

Prospectors Mountain (11,246 feet (3,428 m)) is a mountain in the Teton Range, located within Grand Teton National Park in the U.S. state of Wyoming. Prospectors Mountain rises to the south above Rimrock Lake and Death Canyon.
