= Hanging Canyon =

Glacial valley in Wyoming, United States

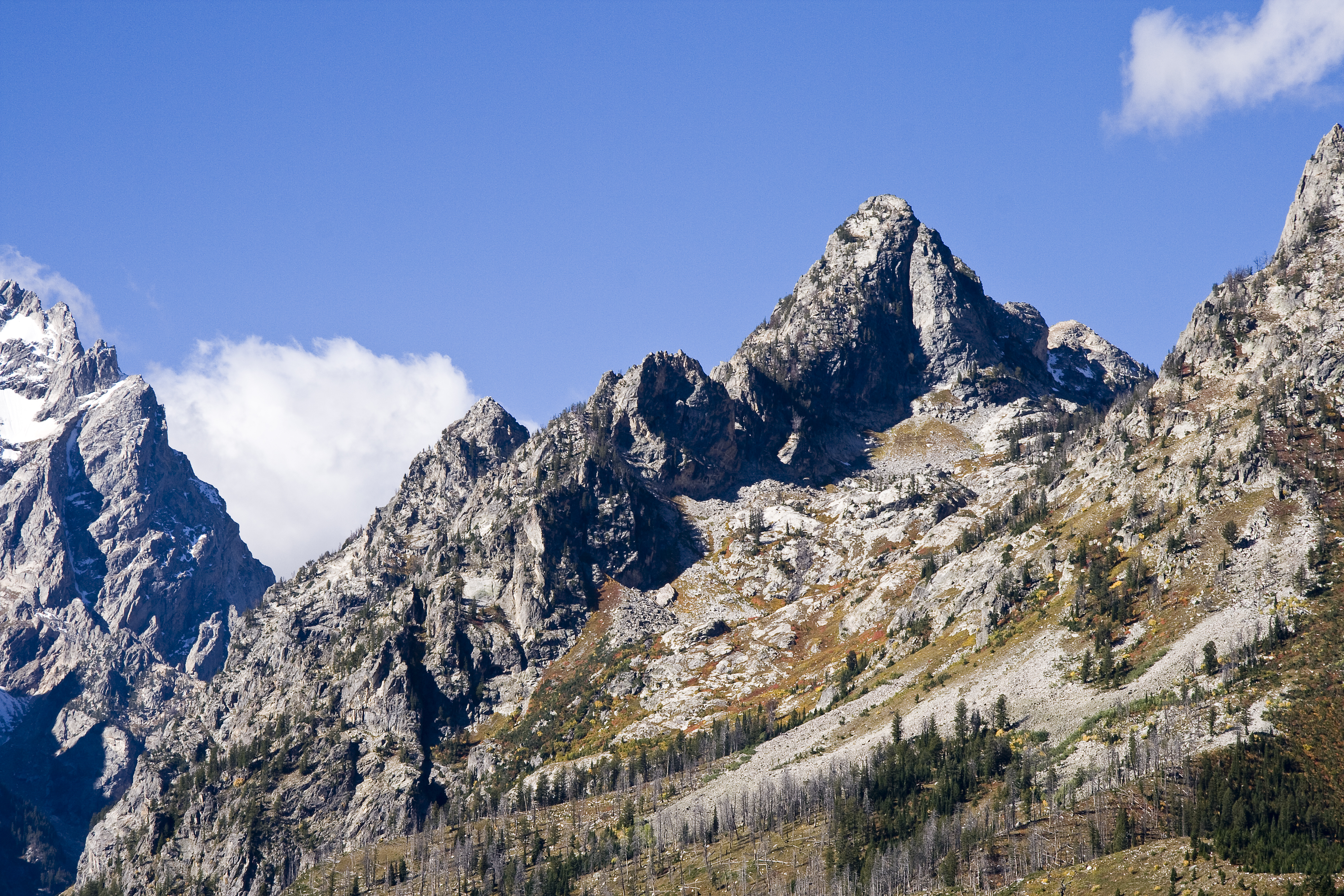
- Hanging Canyon at far right and Symmetry Spire at center right

Geography
- Country: United States
- State: Wyoming
- County: Teton
- Coordinates: 43°46′12″N 110°44′34″W
- Interactive map of Hanging Canyon

Hanging Canyon is located in Grand Teton National Park, in the U. S. state of Wyoming. The canyon was formed by glaciers which retreated at the end of the Last Glacial Maximum approximately 15,000 years ago, leaving behind a U-shaped valley. Hanging Canyon is south of Mount Saint John and north of Symmetry Spire. The canyon is northwest of Jenny Lake and within the canyon lies Lake of the Crags, Ramshead Lake and Arrowhead Pool.

== See also ==
- Canyons of the Teton Range
- Geology of the Grand Teton area
- Hanging Valleys geological feature.
- Ribbon Cascade, Teton County
