= Jedediah Smith Wilderness =

Wilderness area in Wyoming, United States

- IUCN category Ib (wilderness area)
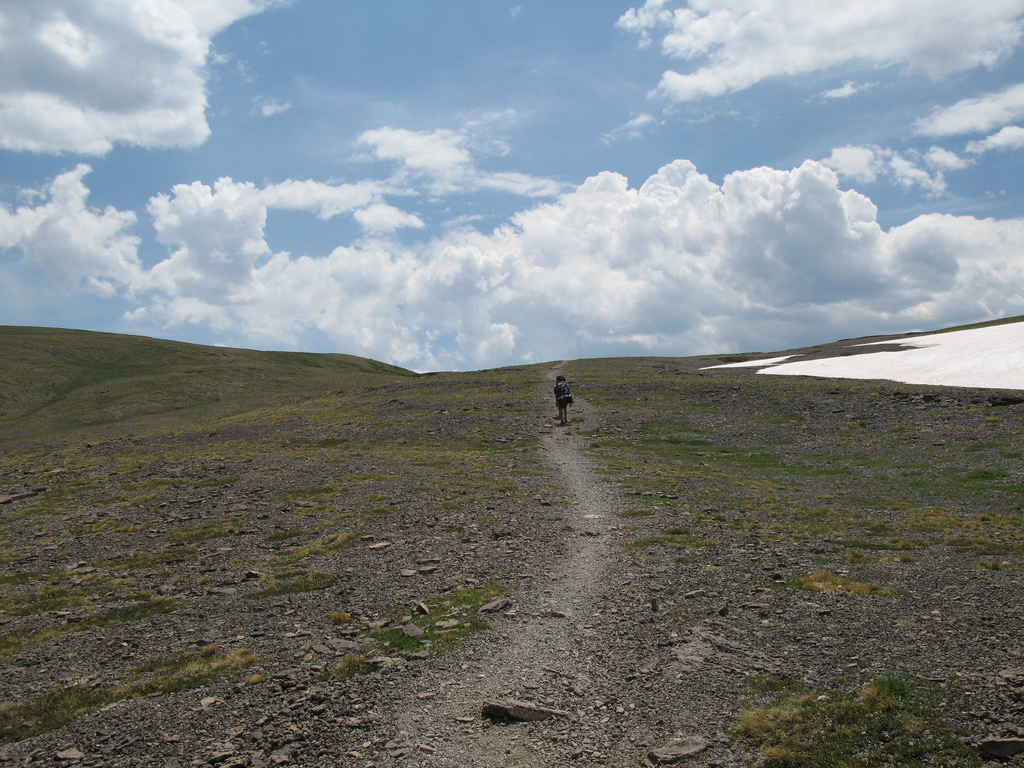
- Hurricane Pass in the Jedediah Smith Wilderness

- Location within the United States
- Location: Teton County, Wyoming, USA
- Nearest city: Jackson, WY
- Coordinates: 44°04′N 110°53′W
- Area: 123,451 acres (499.59 km^{2})
- Established: 1984
- Governing body: U.S. Forest Service

The Jedediah Smith Wilderness is located in the U.S. state of Wyoming. Designated wilderness by Congress in 1984, Jedediah Smith Wilderness is within Caribou-Targhee National Forest and borders Grand Teton National Park. Spanning along the western slopes of the Teton Range, the wilderness ensures a high level of protection to this delicate ecosystem. Jedediah Smith Wilderness is an integral part of the Greater Yellowstone Ecosystem.

U.S. Wilderness Areas do not allow motorized or mechanized vehicles, including bicycles. Although camping and fishing are allowed with proper permit, no roads or buildings are constructed and there is also no logging or mining, in compliance with the 1964 Wilderness Act. Wilderness areas within National Forests and Bureau of Land Management areas also allow hunting in season.

== See also ==
- List of U.S. Wilderness Areas
