= National Register of Historic Places listings in Grand Teton National Park =

This is a list of the National Register of Historic Places listings in Grand Teton National Park.

This is intended to be a complete list of the properties and districts on the National Register of Historic Places in Grand Teton National Park, Wyoming, United States.

There are 36 properties and districts listed on the National Register in the park, two of which are National Historic Landmarks.

This National Park Service list is complete through NPS recent listings posted June 20, 2025.

== Current listings ==
	Name on the Register	Image	Date listed	Location	City or town	Description
1	4 Lazy F Dude Ranch	4 Lazy F Dude Ranch	April 23, 1990 (#90000611)	4 Lazy F Ranch Rd. 43°40′01″N 110°42′20″W	Moose	Summer home and purpose-built dude ranch established in 1927, with 18 contributing properties, representing the later stage of the industry building from the ground up rather than adapting working ranches.
2	AMK Ranch	AMK Ranch	April 23, 1990 (#90000615)	AMK Ranch Rd. 43°56′20″N 110°38′32″W	Colter Bay Village vicinity	Superlative example of two later stages of rustic architecture as applied to 20th-century vacation homes, with 14 contributing properties built in 1927 and 1936–1937. Became the University of Wyoming/National Park Service Research Center in 1977.
3	Bar B C Dude Ranch	Bar B C Dude Ranch	April 23, 1990 (#90000624)	River Rd. 43°41′42″N 110°41′42″W	Moose vicinity	Purpose-built 1912 dude ranch with 37 contributing properties that helped set standards for the local industry under co-owner and author Struthers Burt (1882–1954).
4	The Brinkerhoff	The Brinkerhoff	April 23, 1990 (#90000622)	Teton Park Rd. 43°51′04″N 110°35′37″W	Moran vicinity	1946 vacation home and caretaker's cottage, a late-stage representative of the private leases once dotting Teton National Forest. Also noted for the publicity it brought Grand Teton National Park as a presidential retreat in the 1960s, and for its mid-century twist on rustic architecture.
5	Cascade Canyon Barn	Cascade Canyon Barn	August 18, 1998 (#98001023)	Cascade Canyon Trail; 43°46′03″N 110°49′07″W	Moose vicinity	Circa-1935 barn noted for its NPS rustic architecture and association with the park's backcountry development. Converted to a patrol cabin around 1960.
6	Andy Chambers Ranch Historic District	Andy Chambers Ranch Historic District	April 23, 1990 (#90000623)	Mormon Row Rd. 43°39′32″N 110°39′49″W	Moose vicinity	Farmstead with nine contributing properties built 1917–1925; the most intact representative of Jackson Hole's majority Mormon settlers in the first two decades of the 20th century. Also a contributing property to the Mormon Row Historic District.
7	Chapel of the Transfiguration	Chapel of the Transfiguration	April 10, 1980 (#80004055)	Menors Ferry Rd. 43°39′36″N 110°42′55″W	Moose	Distinctive chapel and two outbuildings built in Western Craftsman style in 1925 for employees and guests of area dude ranches.
8	Cunningham Cabin	Cunningham Cabin	October 2, 1973 (#73000225)	Off U.S. Routes 26/89/187; 43°46′43″N 110°33′30″W	Moose vicinity	Log dogtrot house representing the western diffusion of frontier architecture, built in the second half of the 1880s by one of the first White settlers in Jackson Hole, who later became a prominent rancher and local government official. Now an interpretive site.
9	Death Canyon Barn	Death Canyon Barn	August 25, 1998 (#98001024)	Junction of Death Canyon and Alaska Basin Trails; 43°39′51″N 110°49′52″W	Moose vicinity	1935 barn and corral converted to a backcountry patrol cabin around 1945. Noted for its National Park Service rustic architecture and association with the park's early management.
10	Double Diamond Dude Ranch Dining Hall	Double Diamond Dude Ranch Dining Hall	August 18, 1998 (#98001028)	End Highlands Rd. 43°42′17″N 110°44′07″W	Moose vicinity	Circa-1945 main building of a dude ranch, noted for its rustic architecture. Now part of the Grand Teton Climbers Ranch.
11	Highlands Historic District	Highlands Historic District	August 19, 1998 (#98001029)	End Highlands Rd. 43°42′32″N 110°43′47″W	Moose vicinity	Example of the area's auto camp resorts catering to mid-20th-century tourists, with 19 contributing properties in dude ranch rustic style built 1946–1956. Became park employee housing in 1972.
12	Hunter Hereford Ranch Historic District	Hunter Hereford Ranch Historic District	August 24, 1998 (#98001031)	Antelope Flats Rd. 43°40′35″N 110°36′37″W	Moose vicinity	Eight intact work components of a hobby ranch established in 1945, exemplifying the final stage of agricultural development in Jackson Hole while exhibiting both vernacular and architect-designed rustic architecture.
13	Jackson Lake Lodge	Jackson Lake Lodge	July 31, 2003 (#03001039)	101 Jackson Lake Lodge Rd. 43°52′39″N 110°34′39″W	Moran vicinity	1955 International Style lodge and cottage complex with 39 contributing properties; Gilbert Stanley Underwood's last major work, which introduced and legitimized Modern architecture in the National Park system and lay the basis for the Mission 66 initiative.
14	Jackson Lake Ranger Station	Jackson Lake Ranger Station	April 23, 1990 (#90000620)	Off Teton Park Rd. 43°52′18″N 110°34′17″W	Moran vicinity	Four-building ranger station built in 1933 by the U.S. Forest Service; the most intact representative of the tempestuous transfer of the area to the National Park Service.
15	Jenny Lake Boat Concession Facilities	Jenny Lake Boat Concession Facilities	August 24, 1998 (#98001032)	Southern end of Jenny Lake; 43°45′05″N 110°43′35″W	Moose vicinity	Circa-1930 boathouse and 1937 NPS rustic cabin, the oldest concession properties at the park's first developed visitor area.
16	Jenny Lake CCC Camp NP-4	Jenny Lake CCC Camp NP-4	July 7, 2006 (#98001033)	Off Lupine Meadows Rd. 43°44′57″N 110°43′31″W	Moose vicinity	1935 messhall and bathhouse, two rare surviving buildings attesting to the living conditions of Civilian Conservation Corps camps.
17	Jenny Lake Ranger Station Historic District	Jenny Lake Ranger Station Historic District	April 23, 1990 (#90000610)	Jenny Lake Rd. 43°45′08″N 110°43′20″W	Moose vicinity	Grand Teton's principle visitor contact station 1930–1960, with four NPS rustic buildings, including two built by the CCC, a repurposed settler's cabin, and the studio of photographer Harrison Crandall, who helped popularize the park.
18	Kimmel Kabins	Kimmel Kabins	April 23, 1990 (#90000612)	Lupine Meadows Rd. 43°44′38″N 110°43′38″W	Moose vicinity	The park's only surviving motor court, with 13 dude ranch–style contributing properties built in 1937.
19	Leigh Lake Ranger Patrol Cabin	Leigh Lake Ranger Patrol Cabin	April 23, 1990 (#90000618)	Leigh Lake Trail; 43°49′38″N 110°43′34″W	Moose vicinity	Backcountry patrol cabin built in the early 1920s, representing the U.S. Forest Service's stewardship of the area before the national park was established in 1929.
20	Geraldine Lucas Homestead–Fabian Place Historic District	Geraldine Lucas Homestead–Fabian Place Historic District	August 24, 1998 (#98001034)	Off Teton Park Rd. 43°43′03″N 110°43′57″W	Moose vicinity	Homestead with 11 contributing properties, unusually established 1913–1938 by a single woman; becoming in 1945 the summer home of a Snake River Land Company official instrumental in amassing local properties for park expansion.
21	Manges Cabin	Manges Cabin	August 19, 1998 (#98001035)	Off Teton Park Rd. 43°41′54″N 110°44′02″W	Moose vicinity	Distinctive 1½-story log cabin built in 1911 with wide, snow-shedding eaves, representing vernacular architecture.
22	Menor's Ferry	Menor's Ferry	April 16, 1969 (#69000016)	Menors Ferry Rd. 43°39′33″N 110°42′44″W	Moose	Well-preserved 19th-century ferry operation, consisting of a cabin/general store and replica ferry and cableworks.
23	Moose Entrance Kiosk	Moose Entrance Kiosk	April 23, 1990 (#90000619)	Teton Park Rd. 43°39′37″N 110°43′17″W	Moose	Small entrance station built sometime 1934–1939, representing Grand Teton's National Park Service rustic architecture of 1930s and its only example of this building plan.
24	Moran Bay Patrol Cabin		August 25, 1998 (#98001037)	Northern bank of Moran Bay on Jackson Lake; 43°52′04″N 110°44′30″W	Colter Bay Village vicinity	Backcountry patrol cabin built c. 1932 on U.S. Forest Service land later incorporated into Grand Teton National Park; significant for its rustic architecture and association with park development. Destroyed by a forest fire in 2000.
25	Mormon Row Historic District	Mormon Row Historic District	June 5, 1997 (#97000495)	Mormon Row Rd. 43°39′40″N 110°39′51″W	Moose vicinity	Row of six homesteads inhabited 1908–1950, with 44 contributing properties noted for their vernacular architecture and association with the extension of Mormon settlement and agriculture into marginal, high-elevation areas.
26	Murie Ranch Historic District	Murie Ranch Historic District	August 24, 1998 (#98001039)	Off Moose Wilson Rd. 43°39′01″N 110°43′43″W	Moose	Former ranch with 26 contributing properties acquired in 1945 by wildlife biologists turned conservation leaders Olaus (1889–1963), Adolph (1899–1974), and Margaret Murie (1902–2003). Now part of the Teton Science Schools.
27	Murie Residence	Murie Residence	April 23, 1990 (#90000616)	Off Moose Wilson Rd. 43°39′00″N 110°43′39″W	Moose	House and studio of Olaus Murie (1889–1963) from 1945 until death; president of The Wilderness Society and a national leader in the conservation movement. Also a contributing property to the Murie Ranch Historic District.
28	Old Administrative Area Historic District	Old Administrative Area Historic District	April 23, 1990 (#90000621)	Off Teton Park Rd. 43°41′10″N 110°44′08″W	Moose vicinity	Headquarters complex with 15 contributing properties built 1934–1939, representing Grand Teton's National Park Service rustic architecture of 1930s and its only examples of these building plans.
29	Ramshorn Dude Ranch Lodge	Ramshorn Dude Ranch Lodge	August 19, 1998 (#98001041)	1 Ditch Creek Rd. 43°40′13″N 110°35′49″W	Kelly	Circa-1935 lodge noted for its characteristic dude ranch log architecture, workmanship, and layout. Now part of the Teton Science Schools.
30	Snake River Land Company Residence and Office	Snake River Land Company Residence and Office	July 7, 2006 (#98001036)	Off U.S. Route 191, ¼ mile north of Moran; 43°50′33″N 110°30′47″W	Moran	1927 house with two outbuildings, noted for its late vernacular architecture and use 1930–1950 as the headquarters of the Snake River Land Company, the front behind which John D. Rockefeller Jr. bought land for park expansion.
31	String Lake Comfort Station	String Lake Comfort Station	April 23, 1990 (#90000617)	String Lake Rd. 43°47′20″N 110°43′49″W	Moose vicinity	Public restroom built to a standard plan in the second half of the 1930s; representative of Grand Teton's National Park Service rustic architecture of the New Deal.
32	Triangle X Barn	Triangle X Barn	August 19, 1998 (#98001042)	2 Triangle X Ranch Rd. 43°45′53″N 110°34′03″W	Moose vicinity	Log barn exhibiting a variety of notching styles, built circa 1928 with some logs from an unfinished cabin, illustrating the reuse of building materials in frontier settings and the retention of vernacular architecture by dude ranches.
33	Upper Granite Canyon Patrol Cabin	Upper Granite Canyon Patrol Cabin	August 19, 1998 (#98001043)	Granite Canyon Trail; 43°36′49″N 110°53′52″W	Moose vicinity	Backcountry patrol cabin built in 1935, representing the park's early development and National Park Service rustic architecture.
34	White Grass Dude Ranch	White Grass Dude Ranch	April 23, 1990 (#90000613)	1168 Whitegrass Ranch Rd. 43°39′26″N 110°46′26″W	Moose vicinity	Former cattle ranch that became Jackson Hole's longest-lived dude ranch, in operation 1919–1985, exemplifying and influencing the local industry, with 13 contributing properties. Now an architectural conservation training center.
35	White Grass Ranger Station Historic District	White Grass Ranger Station Historic District	April 23, 1990 (#90000614)	100 Whitegrass Ranger Station Rd. 43°39′19″N 110°46′54″W	Moose vicinity	The park's only remaining 1930s horse patrol station, with four contributing properties exhibiting pre-New Deal National Park Service rustic architecture.

== Former listings ==
	Name on the Register	Image	Date listed	Date removed	Location	City or town	Description
1	Leek's Lodge	Leek's Lodge	September 5, 1975 (#75000216)	April 15, 2014	Leeks Marina Rd. 43°55′49″N 110°38′21″W	Colter Bay Village	1926 main building of an early-20th-century resort. Destroyed by fire in 1998, leaving only the stone chimney.

== See also ==
- National Register of Historic Places listings in Teton County, Wyoming
- List of National Historic Landmarks in Wyoming
- National Register of Historic Places listings in Wyoming
