= T. A. Moulton Barn =

- Thomas Alma Moulton Barn
- U.S. Historic district – Contributing property
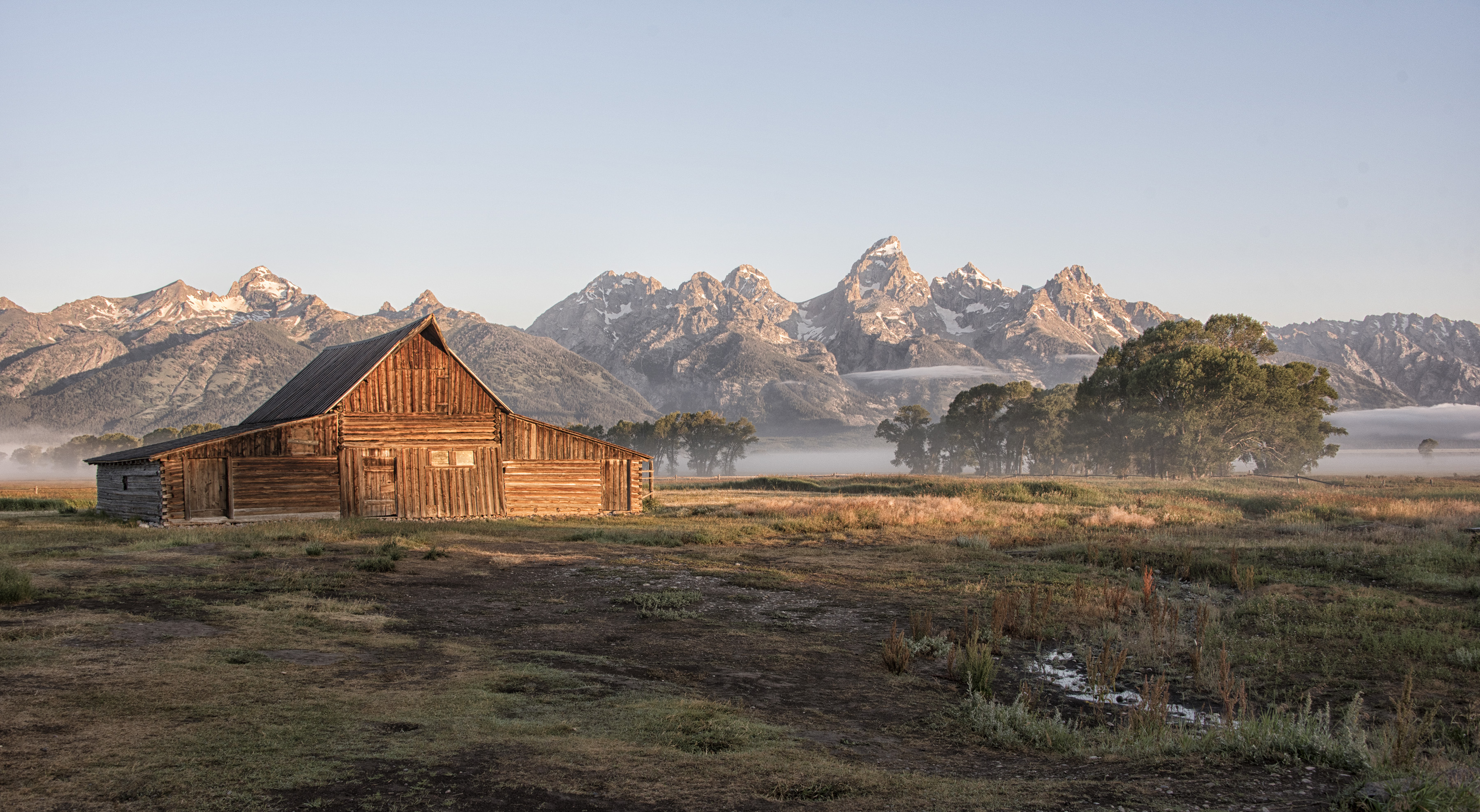
- T. A. Moulton Barn, July 2017

- Location within Wyoming Location within the United States
- Nearest city: Moose, Wyoming, US
- Coordinates: 43°39′38″N 110°39′54″W
- Part of: Mormon Row Historic District
- Designated CP: June 5, 1997

The T. A. Moulton Barn is a historic barn within the Mormon Row Historic District in Teton County, Wyoming, United States.

== Description ==
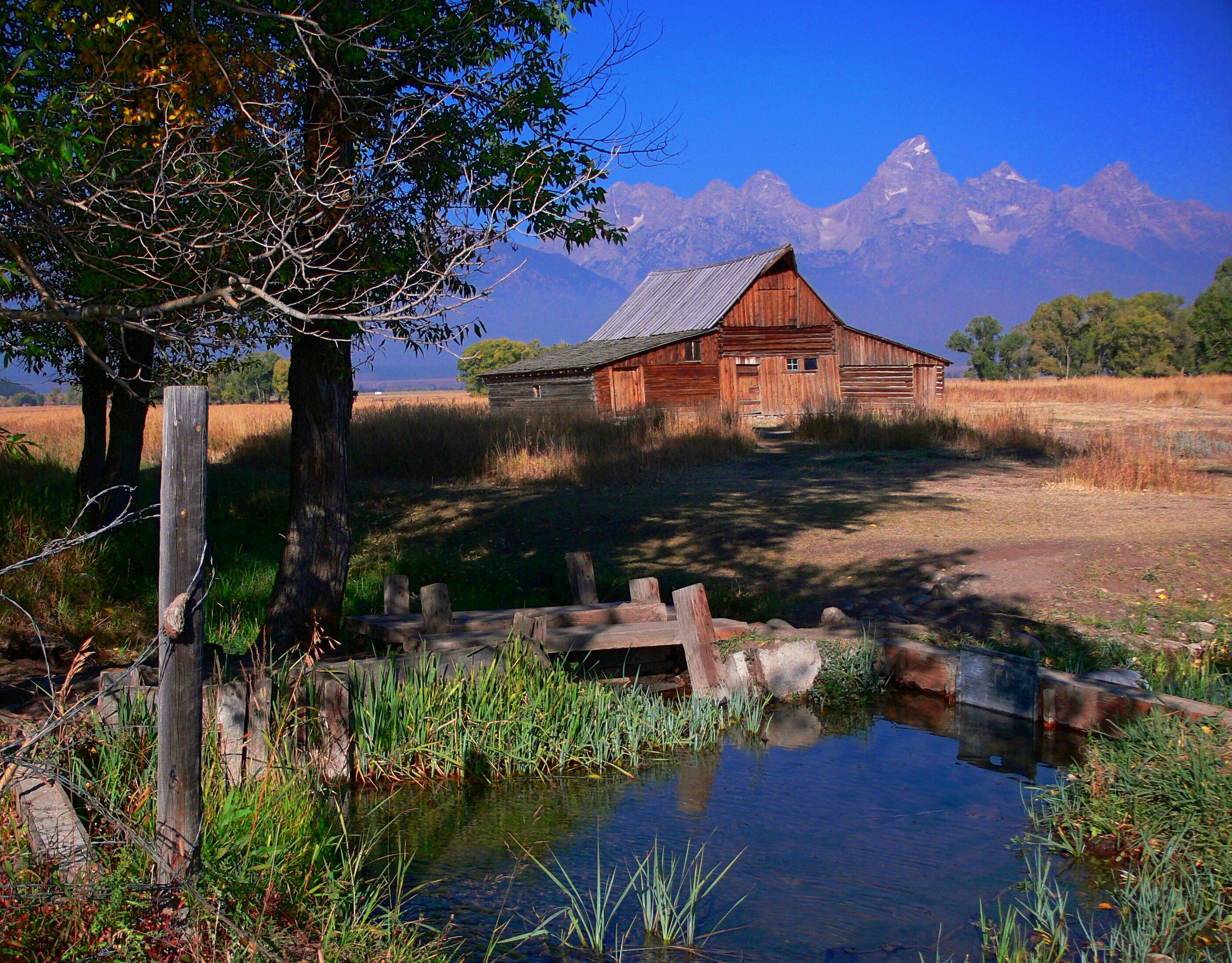
T. A. Moulton Barn, September 2009

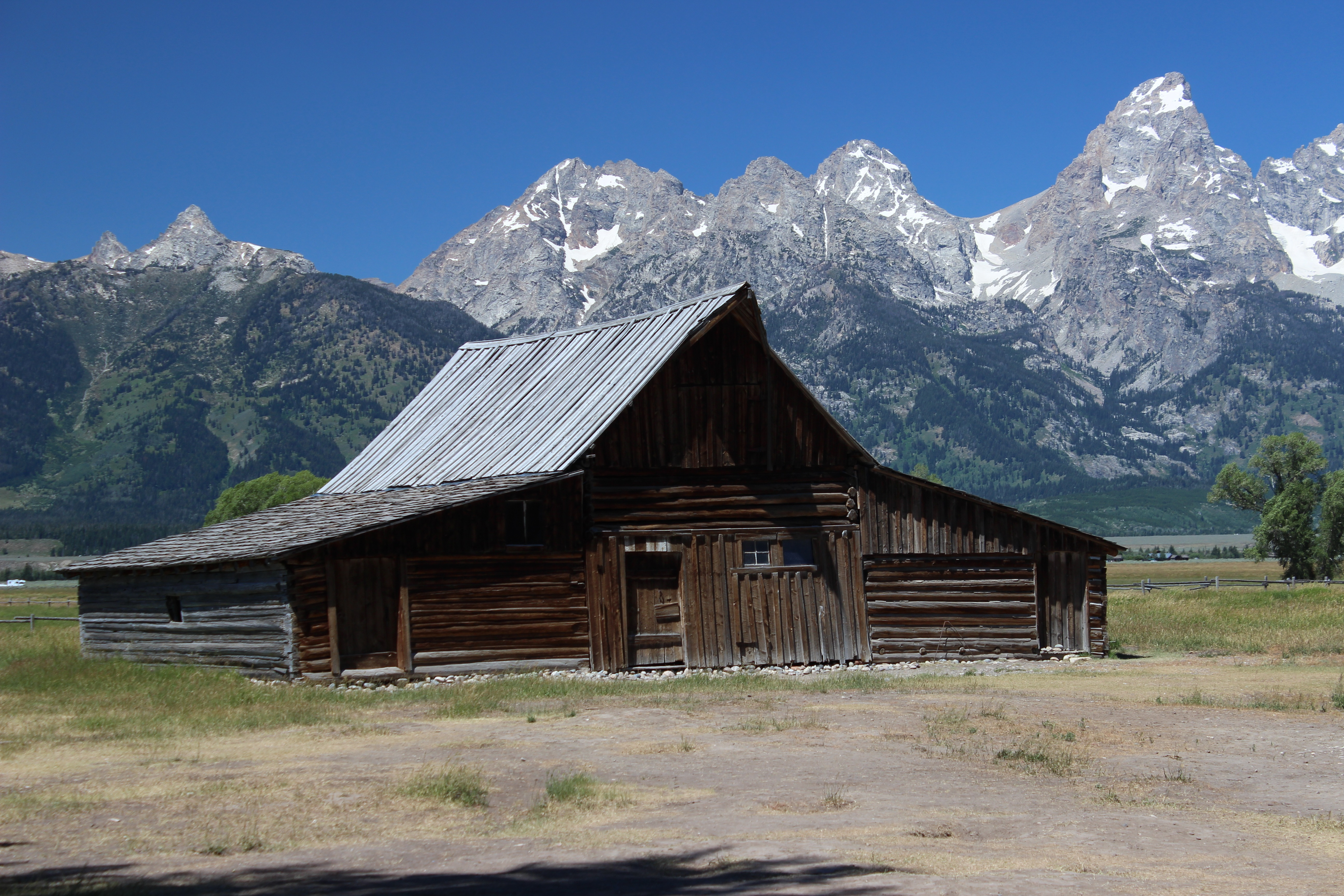
T. A. Moulton Barn, July 2014

The barn is all that remains of the homestead built by Thomas Alma Moulton and his sons between about 1912 and 1945. It sits west of the road known as Mormon Row, in an area called Antelope Flats, between the towns of Kelly and Moose. Now lying within Grand Teton National Park, it is near the homestead of Andy Chambers. The property with the barn was one of the last parcels sold to the National Park Service by the Moulton family. Often photographed, the barn with the Teton Range in the background has become a symbol of Jackson Hole, Wyoming.

== See also ==
- National Register of Historic Places listings in Grand Teton National Park
- National Register of Historic Places listings in Teton County, Wyoming
- Historical buildings and structures of Grand Teton National Park
