= Blacktail =

Blacktail may refer to a location in the United States:

- Blacktail, North Dakota
- Blacktail, South Dakota
- Blacktail Butte, a mountain in Wyoming
- Blacktail Rocks, a mountain in Alaska
- Blacktail (video game), a 2022 video game.

== See also ==
- Black-tailed deer, the namesake animal of these places
