= Snake River Land Company Residence and Office =

Historic house in Wyoming, United States

- U.S. National Register of Historic Places
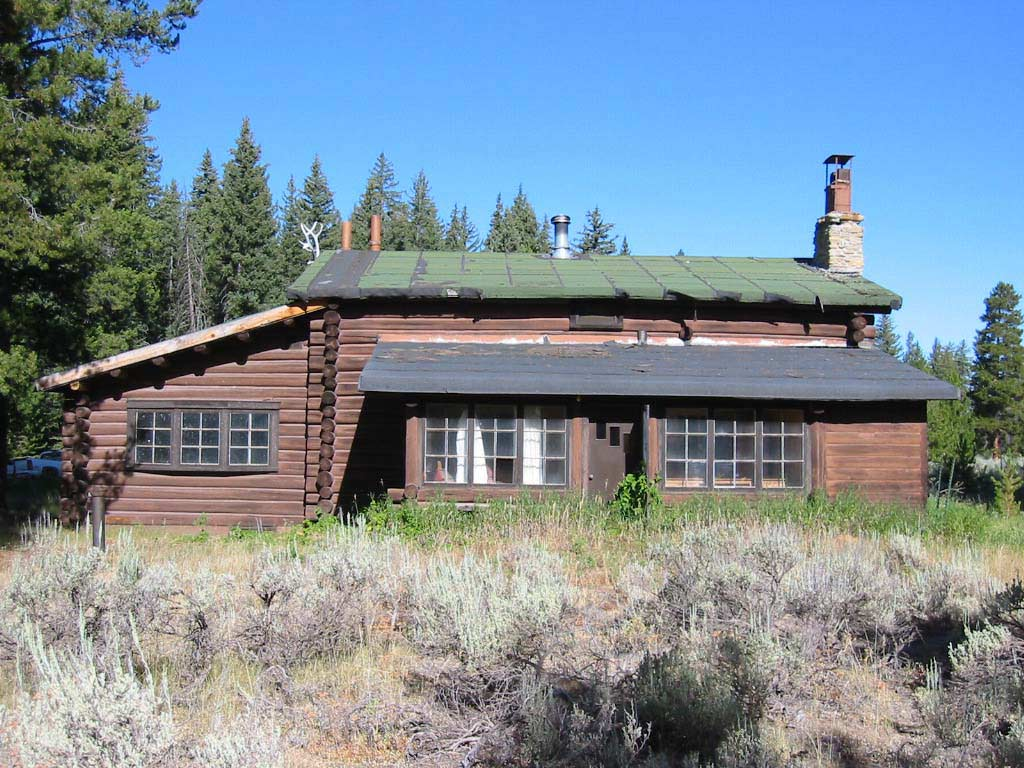

- Location within Wyoming Location within the United States
- Nearest city: Moran, Wyoming
- Coordinates: 43°50′31.6″N 110°30′46.6″W
- MPS: Grand Teton National Park MPS
- NRHP reference No.: 98001036
- Added to NRHP: July 7, 2006

The Snake River Land Company Residence and Office are structures associated with John D. Rockefeller Jr.'s acquisition of land in Jackson Hole, Wyoming, United States. Under the guise of the Snake River Land Company, Rockefeller bought much of the land that he eventually donated to the National Park Service, first as Jackson Hole National Monument and a year later as Grand Teton National Park. The buildings are located in the park, in the community of Moran. They served as the residence and office for SRLC vice president Harold Fabian and foreman J. Allan from 1930 to 1945. The buildings are still used by the National Park Service. The property was owned from 1926 to 1930 by John Hogan, a retired politician from the eastern United States. The Snake River Land Company bought the property in 1930.

The ranch buildings were built by John Hogan, a retired politician from the East, who bought William Carter's homestead in 1926 for use as a guest ranch and fox farm. Hogan built the main residence and the blacksmith shop. Four guest cabins a barn and an ice house no longer exist. The Snake River Land Company bought the property from Hogan in 1930, adding onto the house and building a log garage.

The house, also known as Building 117 and as "Buffalo Dorm", is a 1 1/2-story log structure dating to circa 1926. The original central gabled block was flanked by shed-roofed extensions on the east and west sides, with the stone chimney centered in the eastern side. A later shed-roofed addition covers the front of the central unit. A further gable-roofed addition covers much of the western shed wing. The main entry opens into a large office, with a living room to the north and a kitchen and pantry to the west. The sun room, an enclosed former porch, is reached from the living room. The living room has a raised ceiling that forms the floor of the storage loft above. The stone fireplace dominates the room, with bookshelves to either side. Three bedrooms and a bathroom are in the northwestern portion of the house. On the second floor a central landing leads to two bedrooms on the south and southeast and a storage loft (stated to be "bat infested") to the northeast. The interiors retain many of their historic furnishings and contribute to the ranch's significance.

Harold and Josephine Fabian moved to the Geraldine Lucas Homestead in 1945. The Jackson Hole Preserve, which had succeeded the Snake River Land Company, used the house as a residence for Sonny Allen, manager of the nearby Jackson Hole Wildlife Park at Oxbow Bend. The house was taken over by the Park Service and used as a dormitory before being abandoned. April 2019 work started restoring the home for Park rangers. The house was placed on the National Register of Historic Places in 2006.

== See also ==
- Geraldine Lucas Homestead-Fabian Place Historic District
- Historical buildings and structures of Grand Teton National Park
