= Mountain Academy of Teton Science Schools =

Location
- 700 Coyote Canyon Road; Jackson, Wyoming 83001; United States; 43°29′31″N 110°48′33″W

Information
- Type: Private, Independent, Co-educational
- Established: 2001
- Headmaster: Nancy Lang
- Faculty: 31
- Grades: Pre-K–12
- Gender: Co-educational
- Enrollment: 197
- Student to teacher ratio: 5.7:1
- Campus size: 900 acres 10 buildings
- Campus type: Rural
- Website: www.tetonscience.org/programs/mountain-academy/

Mountain Academy of Teton Science Schools (formerly the Journeys School) is a Pre-K through 12th grade independent school affiliated with Teton Science Schools.

== History ==
Mountain Academy of Teton Science Schools operate in partnership with Grand Teton National Park and were founded in 1967 when Ted Major, a high school biology teacher, led twelve high school students on six weeks of field research in the Greater Yellowstone Ecosystem. The organization began offering outreach programs to regional public and independent schools in 1991, developing what would eventually be formalized as the Journeys Curriculum. Mountain Academy of Teton Science Schools was officially established as an independent school and a program of Teton Science Schools in 2001. Mountain Academy of Teton Science Schools partners with the Teacher Learning Center of Teton Science Schools to offer professional development to visiting teachers.

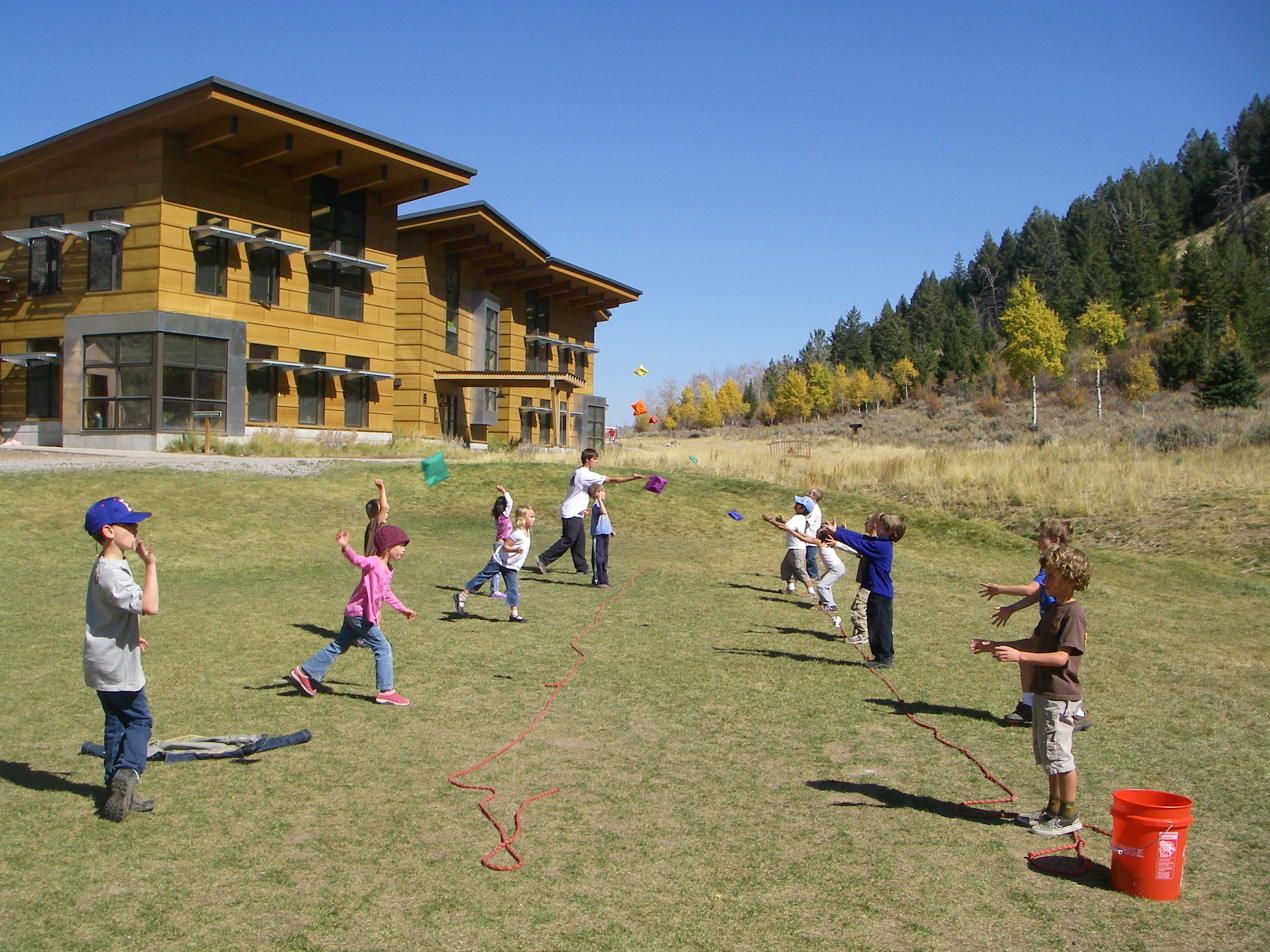
Mountain Academy of Teton Science Schools students playing at recess

== Academics ==
Mountain Academy of Teton Science Schools is an accredited member of the Pacific Northwest Association of Independent Schools. As an independent, non-profit school that has received full accreditation from an approved accrediting program, Mountain Academy of Teton Science Schools is a full member of the National Association of Independent Schools. Mountain Academy of Teton Science Schools is an International Baccalaureate World School and is authorized to offer the IB Diploma Program to students aged 16–19. Classes in the Pre-K are based on the Reggio Emilia approach. All students in grades 9-11 take the PSAT (Pre-Scholastic Aptitude Test).

== Honor code ==
According to the school's website, three of the values most important to Mountain Academy of Teton Science Schools community are as follows:

1. Students and faculty try hard by working to their full potential at all times
2. Students and faculty treat others with respect by honoring diverse opinions and backgrounds, representing themselves and the school with high standards
3. Students and faculty take responsibility for their own actions and their own learning

== Campus and buildings ==
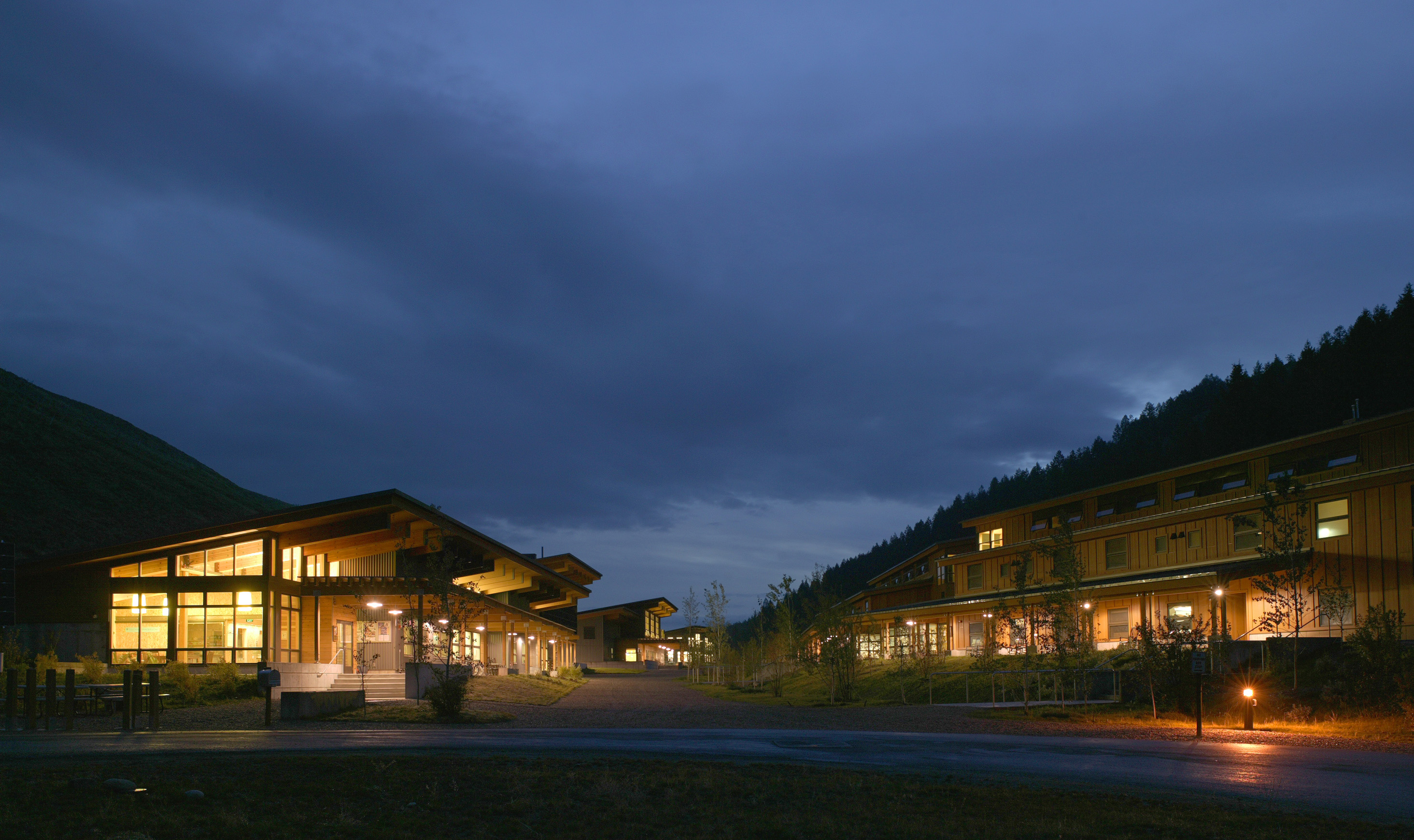
Mountain Academy of Teton Science Schools Jackson Campus

The Jackson Campus of Mountain Academy of Teton Science Schools is housed approximately 2 miles (3.2 km) from Jackson, Wyoming. It comprises 9 new buildings totalling 63,000 square feet (5,900 m^{2}), all designed and constructed on environmental principles, and occupying less than 2% of the site's area. In addition to classrooms, dining facilities and administrative areas, the campus includes two lodges for visiting students and summer workshops, and a Teachers' Learning Center. The architects were Mithun of Seattle.
