= Andy Chambers Ranch Historic District =

Historic district in Wyoming, United States

- Chambers, Andy, Ranch Historic District
- U.S. National Register of Historic Places
- U.S. Historic district
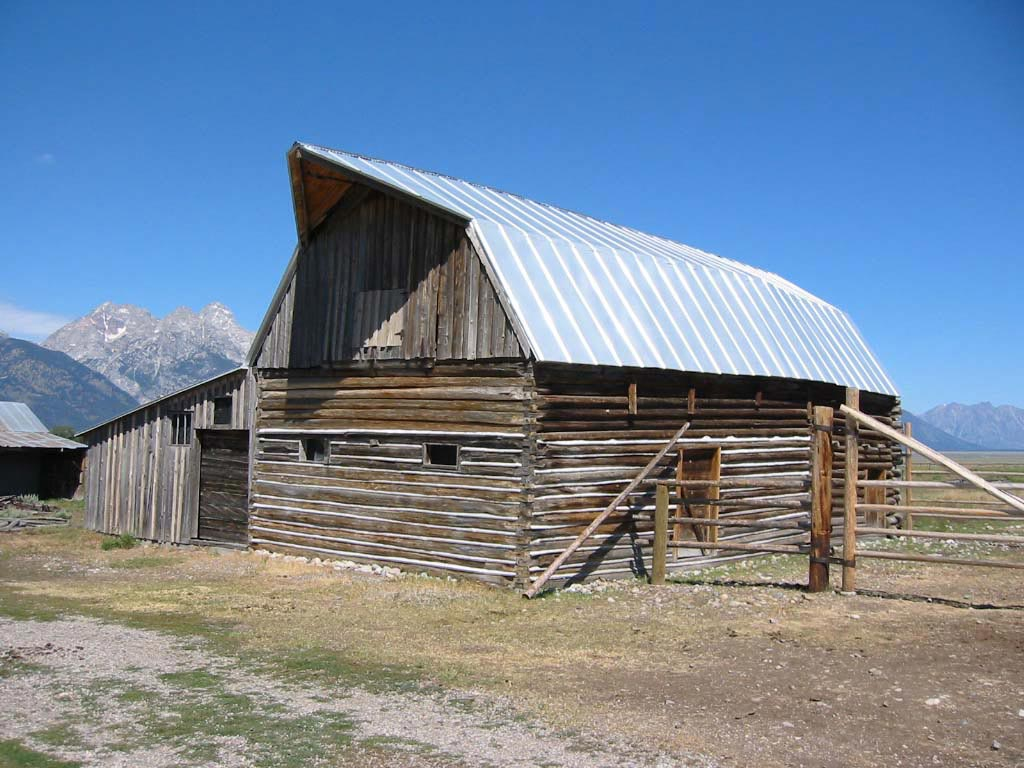
- Barn on the Andy Chambers Ranch

- Location within Wyoming Location within the United States
- Location: Grand Teton National Park, Jackson Hole; Teton County, Wyoming; United States
- Nearest city: Moose, Wyoming
- Coordinates: 43°39′29″N 110°39′41″W
- MPS: Grand Teton National Park MPS
- NRHP reference No.: 90000623
- Added to NRHP: April 23, 1990

The Andy Chambers Ranch is a historic district in Teton County, Wyoming, United States, that is listed on the National Register of Historic Places.

== Description ==
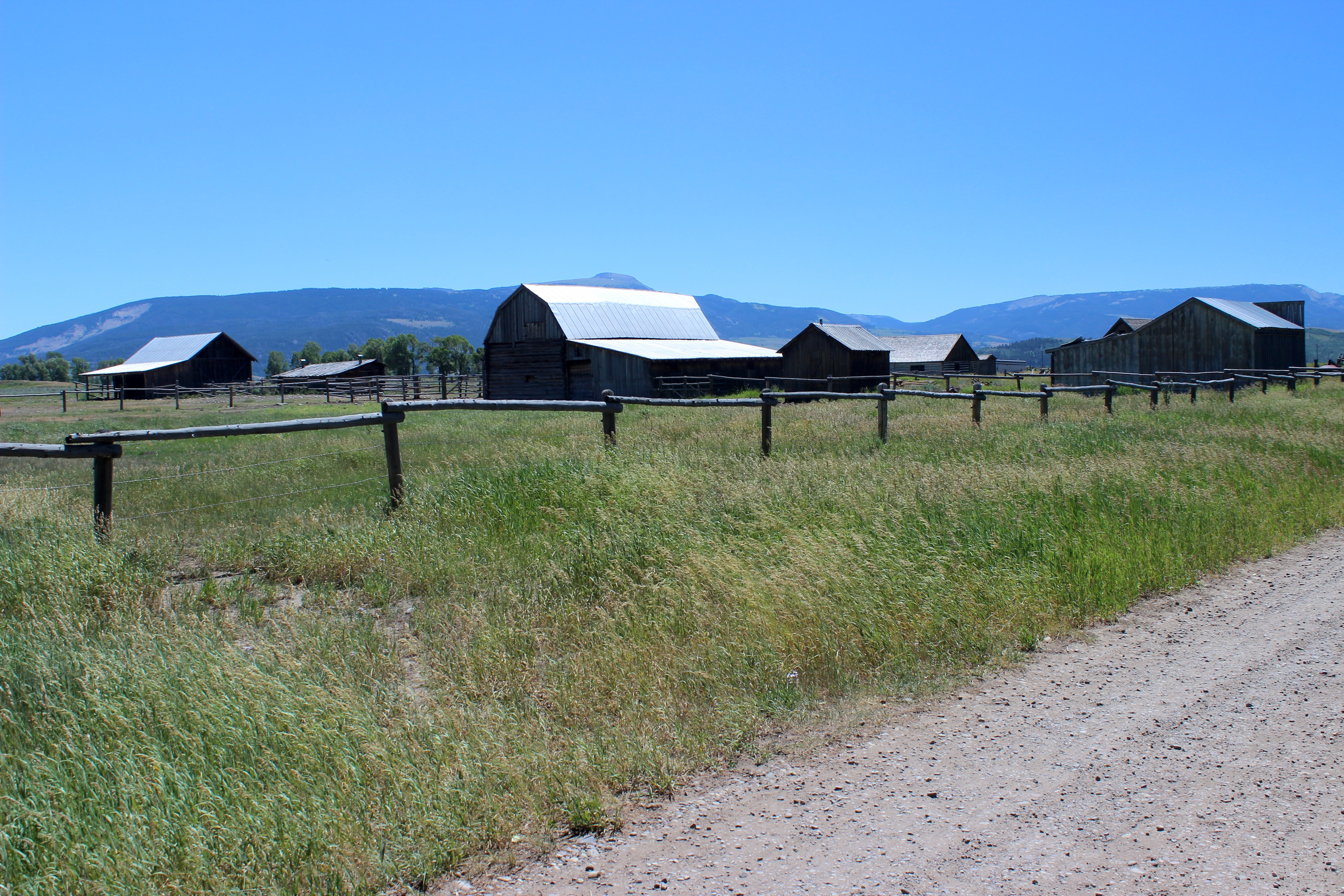
Andy Chambers Ranch, July 2014

The ranch is the only remaining nearly complete farmstead in Mormon Row, itself a historic district the southeast corner of Grand Teton National Park, in the valley called Jackson Hole. The locale was settled by Mormon migrants between 1900 and 1920, creating an enclave near the Gros Ventre River. The farmstead dates to the 1920s and includes a house, barn, garage and a variety of outbuildings.

The Mormon Row was a line village, similar to Grouse Creek, Utah, with a relatively dense development stretched along the line of the connecting road, allowing for extensive pasturage along either side behind the houses and buildings.

The Andy Chambers Ranch was added to the National Register of Historic Places on April 23, 1990.

== See also ==
- National Register of Historic Places listings in Grand Teton National Park
- National Register of Historic Places listings in Teton County, Wyoming
- Historical buildings and structures of Grand Teton National Park
