= Mormon Row Historic District =

Historic district in Teton County, Wyoming, United States

- U.S. National Register of Historic Places
- U.S. Historic district
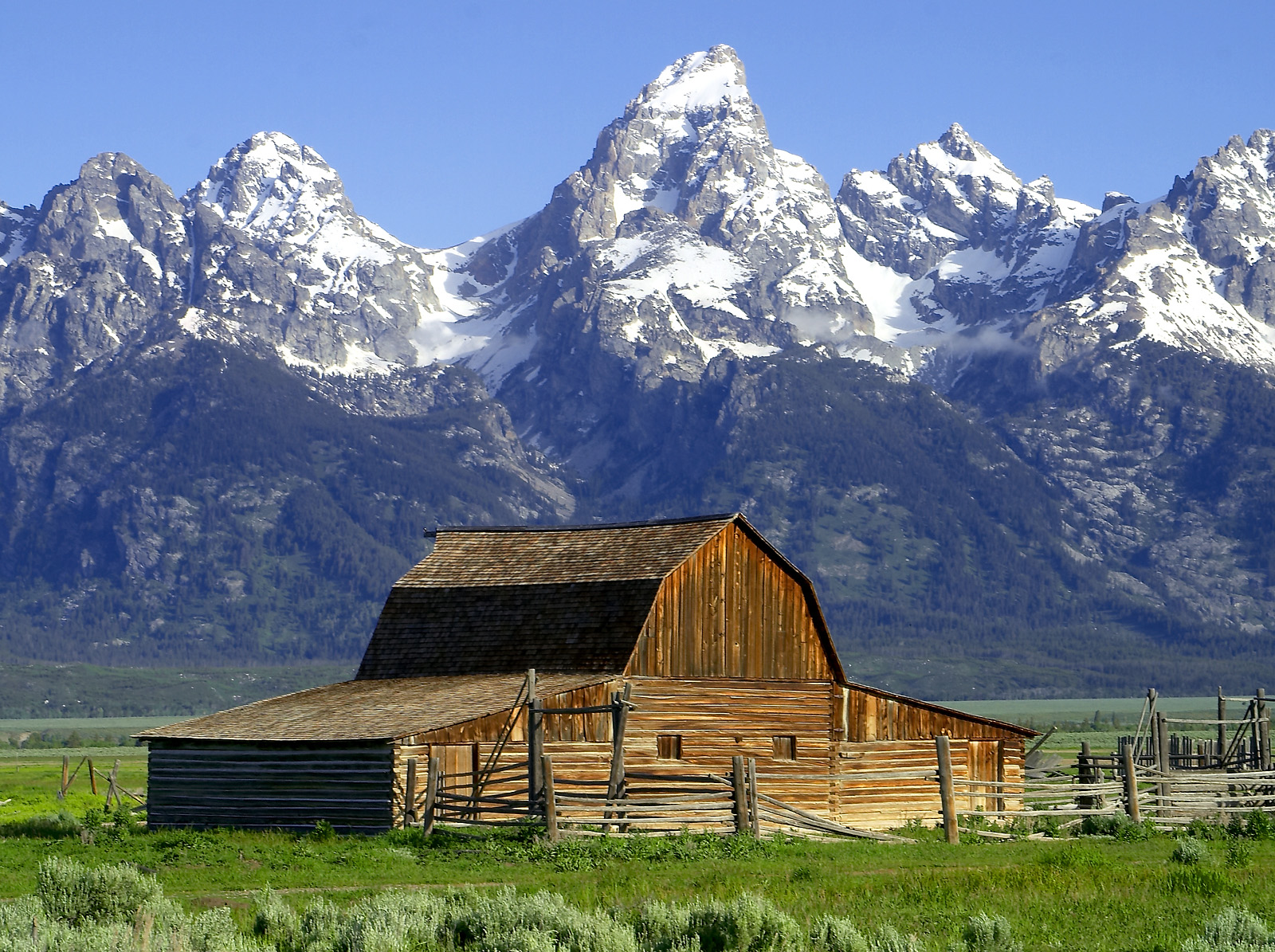
- John Moulton Barn within the Mormon Row Historic District, June 2004

- Location within Wyoming Location within the United States
- Location: Grand Teton National Park, Jackson Hole; Wyoming
- Nearest city: Moose, Wyoming
- Coordinates: 43°39′38.00″N 110°39′51.41″W
- Built: 1927
- MPS: Grand Teton National Park MPS
- NRHP reference No.: 97000495
- Added to NRHP: June 5, 1997

Mormon Row is a historic district within the Grand Teton National Park in Teton County, Wyoming, United States, that is listed on the National Register of Historic Places (NRHP).

== Description ==
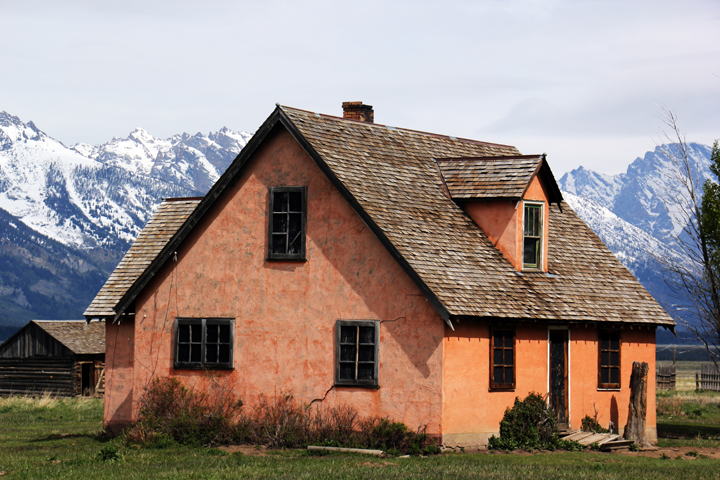
House on the John Moulton ranch, May 2012

The district consists of a line of homestead complexes along the Jackson-Moran Road near the southeast corner of Grand Teton National Park, in the valley called Jackson Hole. The rural historic landscape's period of significance includes the construction of the Andy Chambers, T.A. Moulton and John Moulton farms from 1908 to the 1950s. Six building clusters and a separate ruin illustrate Mormon settlement in the area and comprise such features as drainage systems, barns, fields and corrals. Apart from John and T.A. Moulton, other settlers in the area were Joseph Eggleston, Albert Gunther, Henry May, Thomas Murphy, and George Riniker.

The area is also known as Antelope Flats, situated between the towns of Moose and Kelly. It is a popular destination for tourists and photographers because of the historic buildings, the herds of bison, and the Teton Range rising in the background. The alluvial soil to the east of Blacktail Butte was more suitable than most locations in Jackson Hole for farming, somewhat hampered by a lack of readily available water. The Mormon homesteaders began to arrive in the 1890s from Idaho, creating a community called "Gros Ventre," with a total of twenty-seven homesteads. The Mormon settlers tended to create clustered communities, in contrast to the isolated homesteads more typical of Jackson Hole.

The Mormon Row district was added to the National Register of Historic Places on June 5, 1997.

== See also ==
- National Register of Historic Places listings in Grand Teton National Park
- National Register of Historic Places listings in Teton County, Wyoming
- Historical buildings and structures of Grand Teton National Park
- Andy Chambers Ranch Historic District
- The Church of Jesus Christ of Latter-day Saints in Wyoming
