= Hunter Hereford Ranch Historic District =

Historic district in Wyoming, United States

- U.S. National Register of Historic Places
- U.S. Historic district
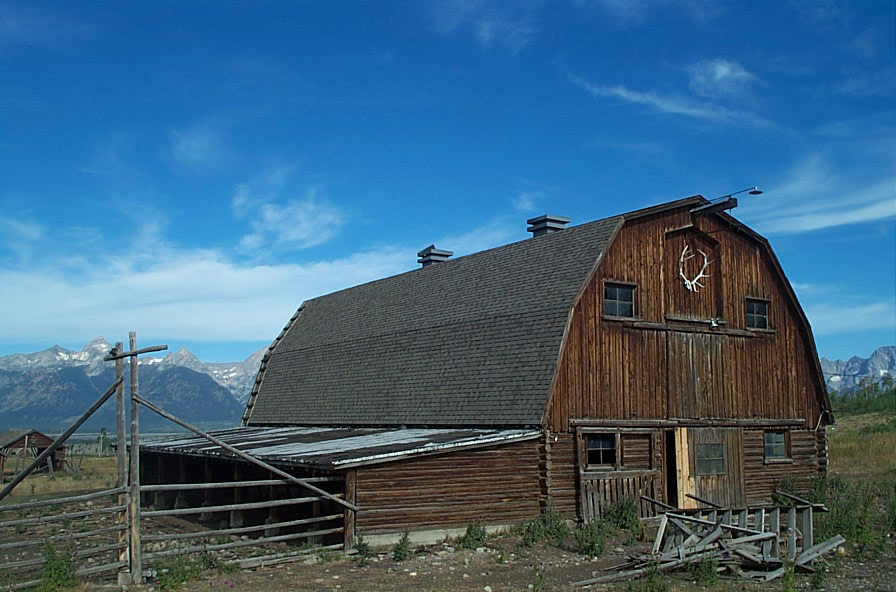

- Location within Wyoming Location within the United States
- Location: Grand Teton National Park, Jackson Hole, Teton County, Wyoming, USA
- Nearest city: Moose, Wyoming
- Coordinates: 43°40′33.25″N 110°36′35.60″W
- Architect: Eber Piers, Neson Brothers Construction Company
- MPS: Grand Teton National Park MPS
- NRHP reference No.: 98001031
- Added to NRHP: August 24, 1998

The Hunter Hereford Ranch was first homesteaded in 1909 by James Williams in the eastern portion of Jackson Hole, in what would become Grand Teton National Park. By the 1940s it was developed as a hobby ranch by William and Eileen Hunter and their foreman John Anderson. With its rustic log buildings it was used as the shooting location for the movie The Wild Country, while one structure with a stone fireplace was used in the 1963 movie Spencer's Mountain. The ranch is located on the extreme eastern edge of Jackson Hole under Shadow Mountain. It is unusual in having some areas of sagebrush-free pasture.

== Description ==
The buildings were designed by architect Eber E. Piers of Ogden, Utah. Piers is more commonly associated with Prairie style architecture; the Hunter Ranch was his only work in a rustic style. Piers was a friend of the Hunters and was paid in room and board, vacationing at the ranch. The large ranch house and guest house, now demolished, was furnished by Thomas C. Molesworth, while the buildings were built by local carpenters, the Nelson brothers. Piers was instructed to model the barn on the Gerritt Hardeman barn near Wilson, Wyoming. The Hardeman ranch was the source of much of the Hunter stock. The Hunter barn, while clearly in keeping with local custom in its character, was constructed to a high standard compared to the more humble structures typical of Jackson Hole ranches.

Additional buildings include a chicken house, stud barn, hay shed, equipment shed and garage, all built in 1945. The foreman's residence was built in 1908 and modified in 1945. The original log homestead cabin was expanded to the east, or rear, and on the north side, with 1- or 1 1/2-story log structures to become the foreman's residence. The log bunkhouse was built about 1921.

The 520-acre (210 ha) ranch was sold to the National Park Service in 1957, but grazing, water and land rights were retained by Eileen Hunter until her death in 1989. The Park Service briefly leased the lands and buildings to the nearby Triangle X Ranch, but terminated the lease in 1991 as part of a plan to return the property to its natural condition. The large Piers-designed Hunter residence and surrounding guest cabins were removed in 1992, leaving the buildings associated with the working ranch intact. A bunkhouse, barn and foremans' cabin remain. Other Piers-designed structures were moved to the Climbers' Ranch and the Teton Science School at the Ramshorn Ranch.

The property within the historic district comprises 160 acres (65 ha), and was placed on the National Register of Historic Places in 1998.

== See also ==
- Ramshorn Dude Ranch Lodge, directly adjacent to the Hunter property
- Historical buildings and structures of Grand Teton National Park
