= Geraldine Lucas Homestead–Fabian Place Historic District =

Historic district in Wyoming, United States

- Lucas, Geraldine Homestead–Fabian Place Historic District
- U.S. National Register of Historic Places
- U.S. Historic district
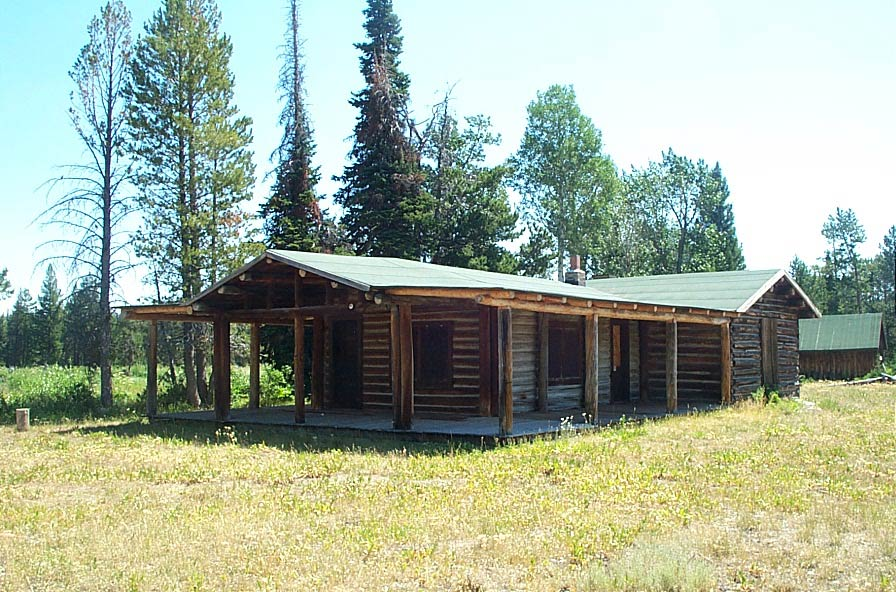

- Location within Wyoming Location within the United States
- Nearest city: Moose, Wyoming
- Coordinates: 43°43′16″N 110°44′3″W
- Built: 1938
- MPS: Grand Teton National Park MPS
- NRHP reference No.: 98001034
- Added to NRHP: August 24, 1998

The Geraldine Lucas–Fabian Place Historic District in Jackson Hole, Wyoming is significant as the 1913 home of Geraldine Lucas, a single woman pioneer in a harsh environment. It later became the home of Harold Fabian, vice president of the Snake River Land Company, which assembled much of the land that became Jackson Hole National Monument for John D. Rockefeller Jr.

The district includes eleven buildings, about 4.5 miles (7.2 km) north of Moose, Wyoming at the base of the Teton Range near Garnet Canyon. The site offers views of the Cathedral Group.

== History ==
Geraldine Lucas was born in 1866 in Iowa City, Iowa and, following an unsuccessful marriage and with a degree from Oberlin College, became a teacher in New York. She retired in 1912 and sought a retirement home. She joined two brothers and a sister in Jackson Hole and built a cabin in 1913. She filed for a homestead claim, which was granted after a series of difficulties, in 1922. Through a series of deals, she eventually expanded her holdings to 428 acres (1.73 km^{2}). She was also the second woman to ascend Grand Teton, making the climb in 1924 at age 58, guided by 16-year-old Paul Petzoldt, who had made his first climb of Grand Teton earlier that year.

During her lifetime, Geraldine was resolutely opposed to the activities of the Snake River Land Company, which was buying land in Jackson Hole on behalf of John D. Rockefeller Jr., who planned to donate the land for the creation of what would become Grand Teton National Park. Acquisition of the prime Lucas property was a major aim for the company. After Geraldine's death the land was purchased by J.D. Kimmell, with the idea of subdividing and developing the land. He was, however, friends with Harold Fabian of the Snake River Land Company, and in 1944 sold the property to what had become the Jackson Hole Preserve in exchange for rights at Jenny Lake. Fabian and his family moved into the Lucas place in 1946, spending summers there until Harold's death in 1975, under a deal with the Park Service.

== Park use ==
Following acquisition by the National Park Service, the property remained vacant. The 2016 National Park Service historic properties management report for Grand Teton National Park recommended that the buildings be repaired, becoming a visitor destination with interpretive signage.

The property was listed on the National Register of Historic Places on August 24, 1998.

== See also ==
- Snake River Land Company Residence and Office
- Historical buildings and structures of Grand Teton National Park
