= Blacktail Butte =

Mountain in Wyoming, United States

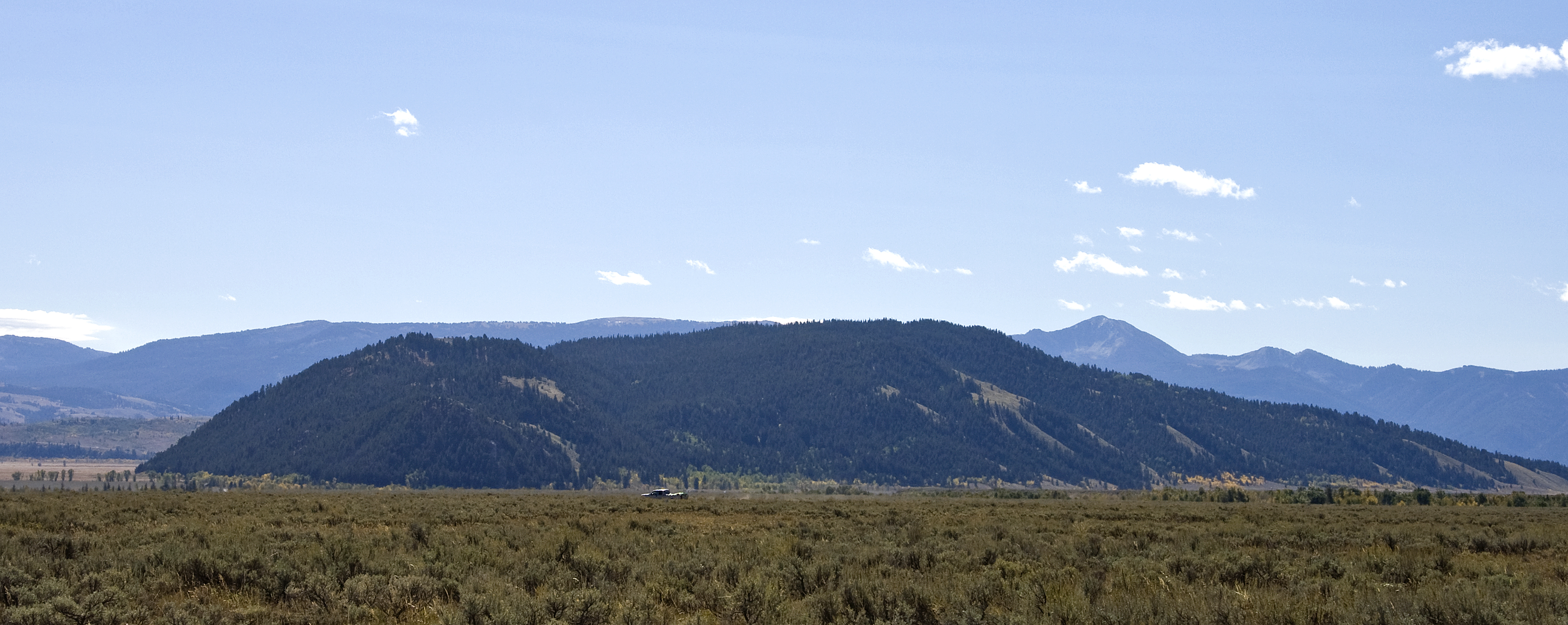
- View from the west

Highest point
- Elevation: 7,688 ft (2,343 m)
- Prominence: 1,078 ft (329 m)
- Coordinates: 43°38′07″N 110°41′35″W

Geography
- Location within Wyoming
- Location: Teton County, Wyoming, U.S.
- Parent range: Gros Ventre Range
- Topo map: USGS Moose

Climbing
- Easiest route: Walk

Blacktail Butte (7,688 feet (2,343 m)) is a butte mountain landform rising from Jackson Hole valley in Grand Teton National Park in the U.S. state of Wyoming. Blacktail Butte was originally named Upper Gros Ventre Butte in an early historical survey conducted by the U.S. Geological Survey. Most of Blacktail Butte is densely forested with a mixed fir forest of lodgepole pine, Douglas fir and Engelmann spruce, with scattered pockets of aspen. There are several large sedimentary rock outcroppings, which are used by rock climbers. This butte is a principal landmark in Jackson Hole, with much of the Jackson Hole valley floor and many portions of the Teton Range visible from its hillsides.

The butte is named after black-tailed deer. Bighorn sheep, mule deer, white-tailed deer, pronghorn antelope, and bison are commonly found in the area, along with grizzly bears and gray wolves. Most notably, many thousands of elk cross through the area during their annual migration to and from their winter feeding grounds on the National Elk Refuge.

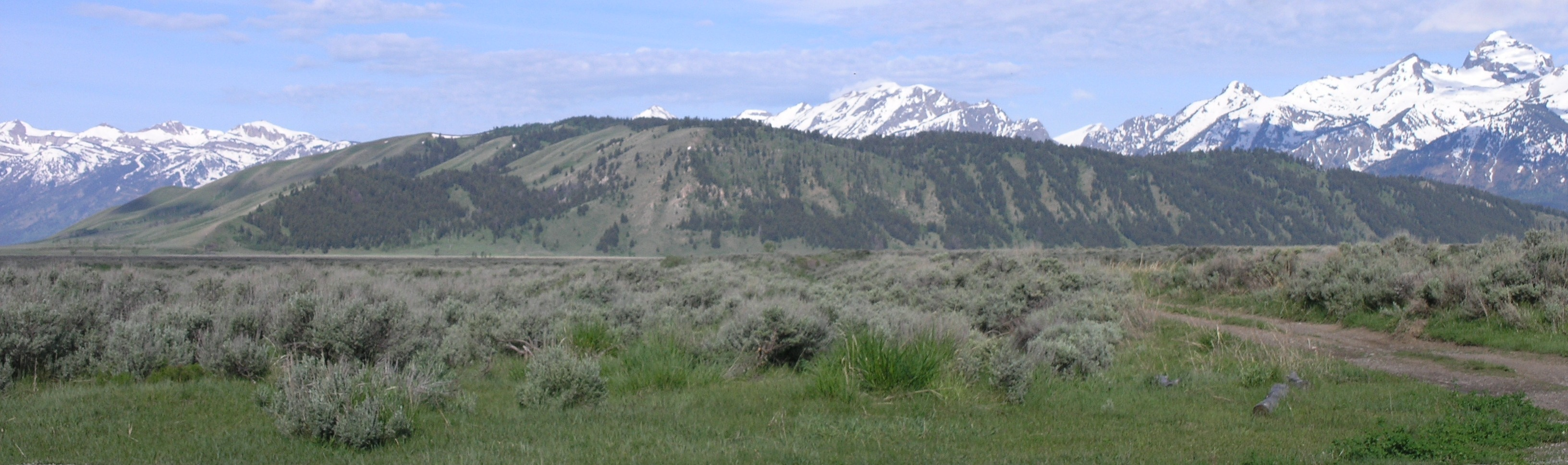
View of Blacktail Butte from the northeast

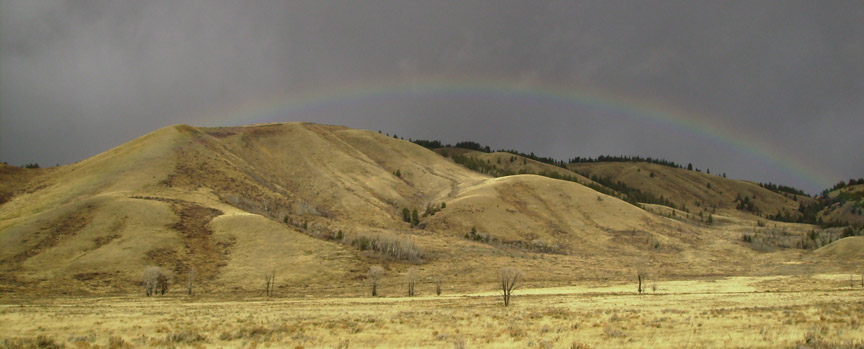
View of Blacktail Butte from the south

Local lore claims that the name reflects the fact that the north face and ridge lines are so heavily wooded that they appear black, as compared to the other slopes, which have sage brush, scrub grass, and fewer trees. There is also a scenic overlook nearby with the same name, Blacktail Pond.

At the base of the butte is Mormon Row, a popular place for photographers and tourists, with the photogenic Moulton Barn and herds of bison.

== See also ==
- Geology of the Grand Teton area
