= Upper Granite Canyon Patrol Cabin =

- U.S. National Register of Historic Places
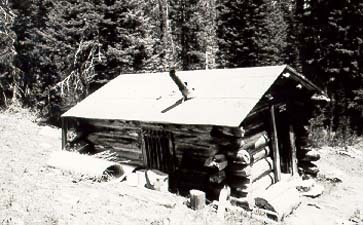

- Location within Wyoming Location within the United States
- Nearest city: Moose, Wyoming
- Coordinates: 43°36′49″N 110°53′50″W
- Architect: Civilian Conservation Corps
- MPS: Grand Teton National Park MPS
- NRHP reference No.: 98001043
- Added to NRHP: August 19, 1998

The Upper Granite Canyon Patrol Cabin was built by the Civilian Conservation Corps in about 1935. The log structure is in the extreme southwest backcountry of Grand Teton National Park. The cabin was built according to a standard design for such structures in the National Park Service Rustic style. The Moran Bay Patrol Cabin is similar.

The patrol cabin is a one-story log cabin on a log sill foundation using 14-inch (36 cm) logs. The cabin is square in plan with asphalt roll roofing on the gabled roof. The door retains its original wrought iron hardware. The interior is floored with 8-inch (20 cm) boards, cut to a length of 3 feet (0.91 m) to fit a pack saddle. The interior logs are trimmed with split-pole chinking. The ceiling is open, with exposed log framing.

The cabin was placed on the National Register of Historic Places on August 19, 1998.

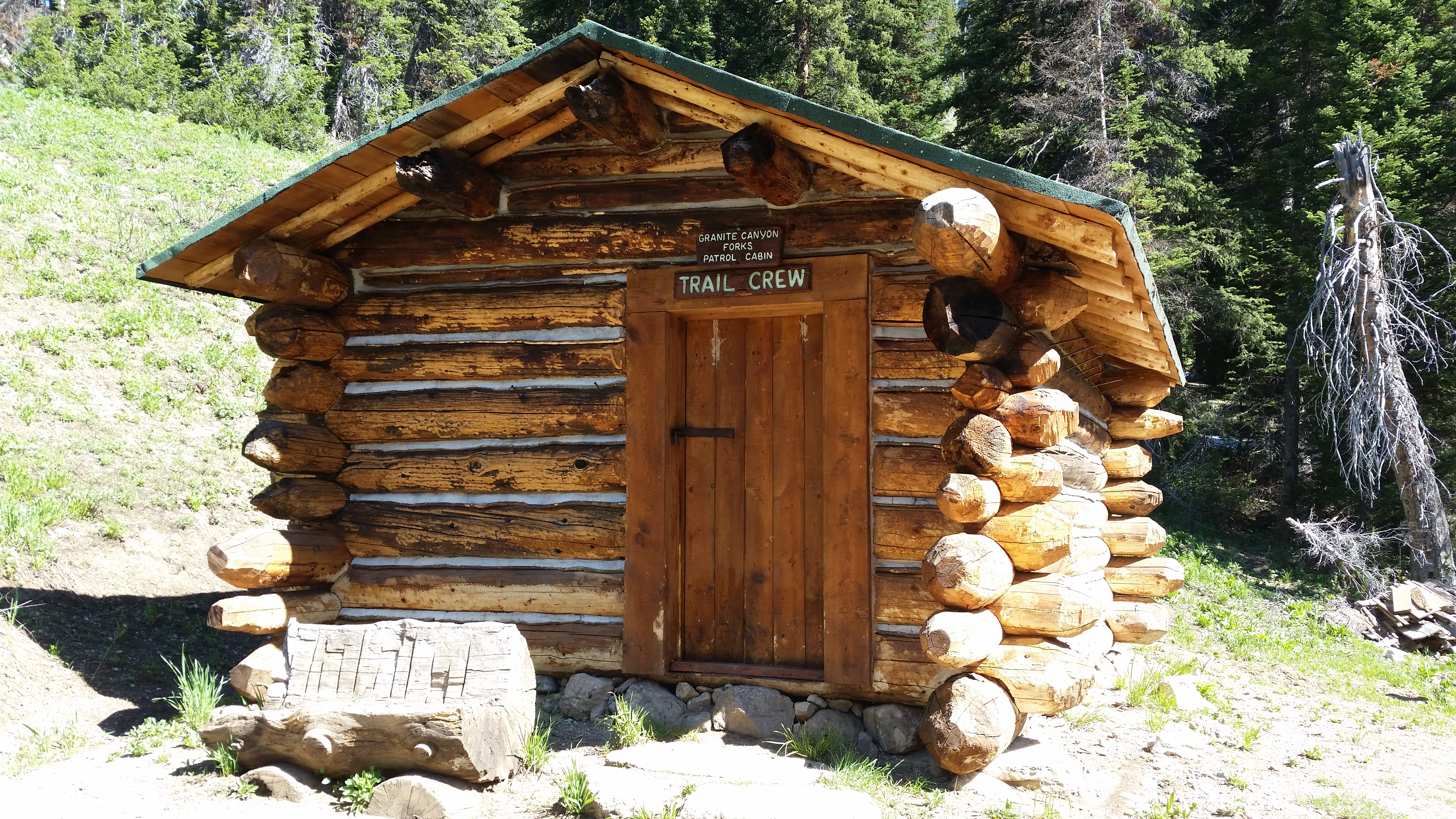

== See also ==
- Historical buildings and structures of Grand Teton National Park
