= Moran Bay Patrol Cabin =

- U.S. National Register of Historic Places
- Location within Wyoming Location within the United States
- Nearest city: Moose, Wyoming
- Coordinates: 43°52′2.07″N 110°44′25.13″W
- Architect: USFS
- MPS: Grand Teton National Park MPS
- NRHP reference No.: 98001037
- Added to NRHP: August 25, 1998

The Moran Bay Patrol Cabin was built by the Civilian Conservation Corps about 1932. The log structure was located in the northern backcountry of Grand Teton National Park, and was built to a standard design for such structures, in the National Park Service Rustic style, but for the U.S. Forest Service, which administered much of the area prior to the expansion of the park in 1943. The Upper Granite Canyon Patrol Cabin is similar.

The cabin was a day's hike from the Leigh Lake Ranger Patrol Cabin to the south and the Colter Canyon cabin to the north. Located in a remote portion of the park, the cabin was used for winter ranger patrols. The one story cabin was built on a stone foundation. The log walls were saddle-notched at the corners. The roof was sheathed with cedar shingles and had exposed log purlin structure on the interior, which is a single room. The site features a view of Jackson Lake's Moran Bay, and is at present usually accessed by boat from the lake. The cabin was reconstructed in 1995, and destroyed in a forest fire in 2000.

The Moran Bay Patrol Cabin was listed on the National Register of Historic Places on August 25, 1998

== See also ==
- Historical buildings and structures of Grand Teton National Park
