= Teton Science Schools =

Educational organization in Wyoming and Idaho, US

Coordinates: 43°29′26″N 110°48′41″W

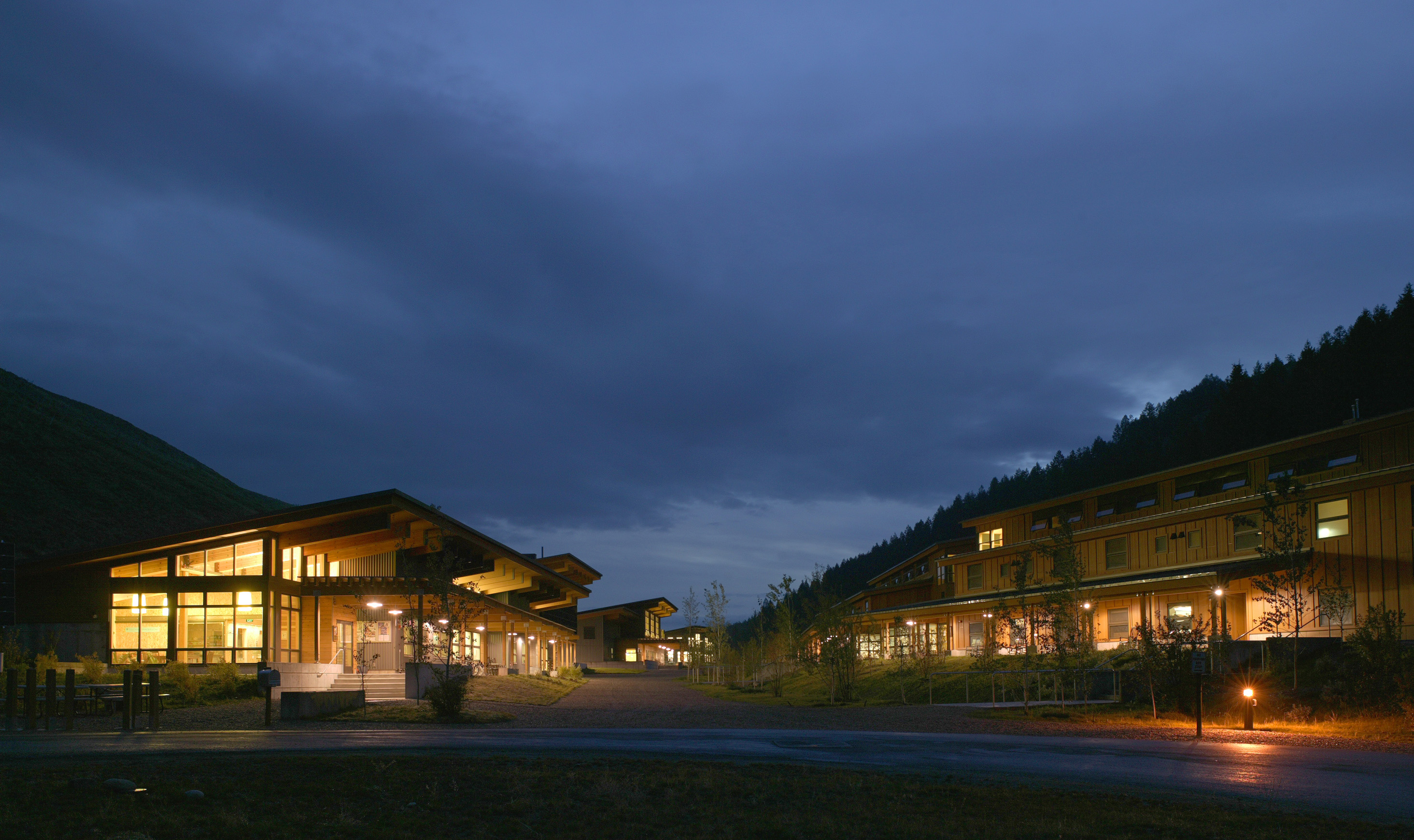
Main campus of Teton Science Schools in Jackson Hole, Wyoming

Teton Science Schools (TSS) is an educational organization located in northwest Wyoming and Idaho. TSS runs programs in outdoor learning experiences, classroom education, and educator development. Founded in 1967, TSS began through teaching about the natural world and the Greater Yellowstone Ecosystem together through the study of nature and place-based education. Teton Science Schools serves students from across Wyoming, the Intermountain West, the nation and around the world.

Teton Science Schools operate place-based programs for students, adults and families, wildlife expeditions, outdoor learning experiences programs, education learning programs for teachers, and two independent day schools.

In 2015, the organization integrated the Murie Ranch, a nonprofit conservation organization located on the Murie Ranch in Moose, Wyoming.

== Structure ==
Teton Science Schools is a private, 501(c)(3) non-profit educational organization, operating year-round in Jackson Hole, Wyoming in partnership with Grand Teton National Park and as a permittee of the Bridger-Teton National Forest.

== Campuses ==
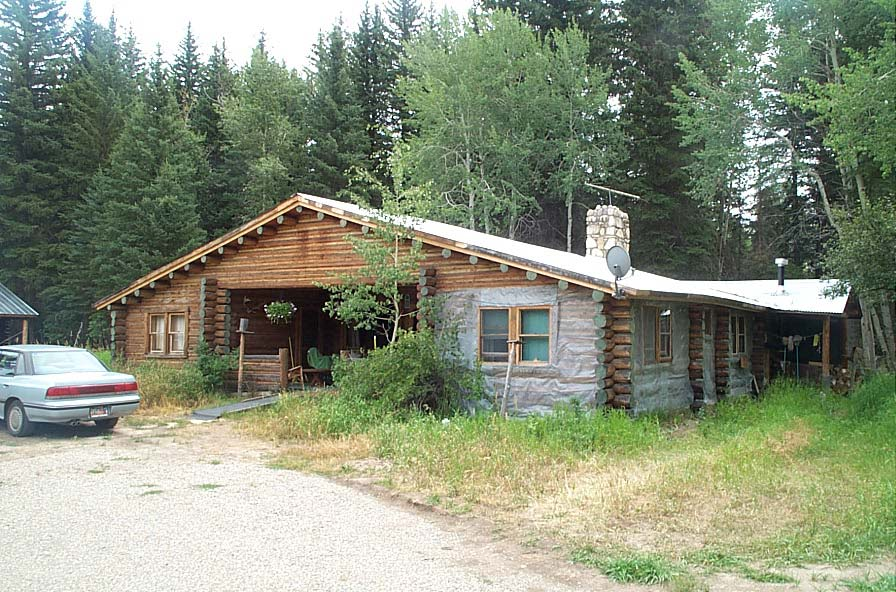
Murie residence at the Murie Ranch

- Jackson Campus – the main campus is located on a 900-acre site in Jackson Hole, which include educational, residential and dining buildings. The Mountain Academy of Teton Science Schools, formerly the Journeys School, an 18-month through 8th grade independent day school operated by TSS, is located here.
- Kelly Campus – the original campus of TSS opened in 1973 in the Ramshorn Dude Ranch Lodge of the former Elbo Ranch inside Grand Teton National Park. Consisting of rustic log buildings preserved in an historic western setting, the site includes classroom, dining and residential buildings for students and housed the participants in the Graduate Program. The Murie Museum houses a collection of over 600 bird study skins, over 1000 mammal study skins, skulls from almost every family of North American mammals and hundreds of plant specimens.
- Murie Ranch – former home of the Murie Center, the site is associated with the conservationists Olaus Murie, his wife Margaret (Mardy) Murie and scientist Adolph Murie and his wife Louise.
- Mountain Academy Teton Valley Campus – serves pre-K through 8th grade, located on a 10 acre-campus in Victor, Idaho
