= Leigh Lake Ranger Patrol Cabin =

- U.S. National Register of Historic Places
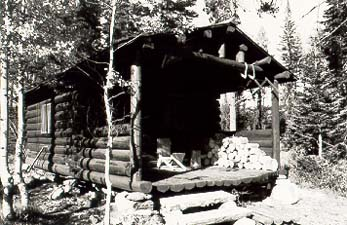

- Location within Wyoming Location within the United States
- Nearest city: Moose, Wyoming
- Coordinates: 43°49′36″N 110°44′16″W
- Architect: U.S. Forest Service
- MPS: Grand Teton National Park MPS
- NRHP reference No.: 90000618
- Added to NRHP: April 23, 1990

Leigh Lake Ranger Patrol Cabin was designed and built by the U.S. Forest Service in the 1920s. The cabin is located northwest of Leigh Lake in Grand Teton National Park in the U.S. state of Wyoming. The cabin was built to a standardized design, similar to that used for the Moran Bay Patrol Cabin. The cabin was acquired by the National Park Service upon the designation of Grand Teton National Park on February 26, 1929, and placed on the National Register of Historic Places on April 23, 1990. The cabin is still in use by the National Park Service.

The Leigh Lake cabin was listed on the National Register of Historic Places on April 23, 1990.

== See also ==
- Historical buildings and structures of Grand Teton National Park
