= Ramshorn Dude Ranch Lodge =

- U.S. National Register of Historic Places
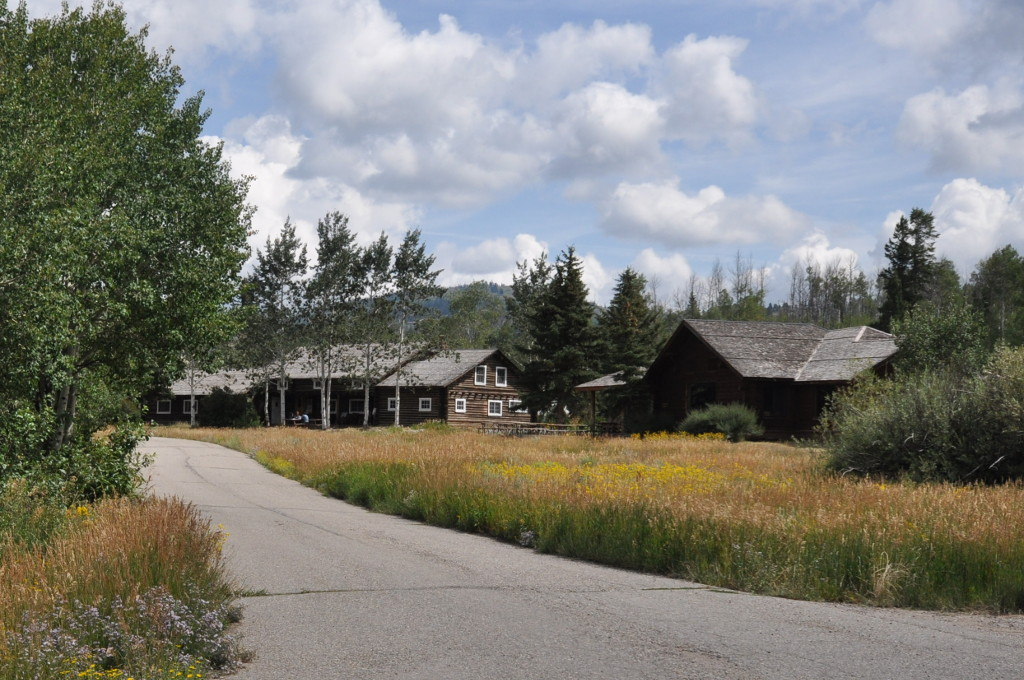

- Location within Wyoming Location within the United States
- Location: Grand Teton National Park, Kelly, Wyoming
- Coordinates: 43°40′11″N 110°35′46″W
- MPS: Grand Teton National Park MPS
- NRHP reference No.: 98001041
- Added to NRHP: August 19, 1998

The Ramshorn Dude Ranch Lodge in Grand Teton National Park was built after 1935 by mountaineers Paul Petzoldt, founder of the National Outdoor Leadership School, and Gustav Koven. The property that became the Ramshorn Ranch was originally established by Ransom Adams at the mouth of Gros Ventre Canyon near Ditch Creek. By 1921 the property was acquired by Jack and Dollye Woodsman, who established the Flying V dude ranch, featuring a large central lodge. In 1932 the lodge burned, prompting the Woodsmans to sell the ranch to Koven and Petzoldt in 1935, who planned to expand the dude ranch as a climbing school and hunting camp. Petzoldt withdrew from the partnership in 1937 after suggesting the name be changed to the Ramshorn Ranch. The present lodge was completed in 1937 by the Woodward brothers, who took over operation. A variety of owners and partners ensued until 1956, when the ranch was sold to the National Park Service. The Park Service then leased the ranch back to concessioners who operated it as the Elbo Ranch until 1973, replacing the former Elbo Ranch purchased by the Park Service. The Teton Science School was established on the property in 1974 under a special use permit.

The lodge is now the main building of the Kelly Campus of the Teton Science School, and retains its rustic character. Structures from the nearby Hunter Hereford Ranch designed by Ogden, Utah architect Eber Piers were moved from the Hunter ranch when the Hunter residential complex was removed in the 1990s. The Ramshorn was listed on the National Register of Historic Places on August 19, 1998.

== See also ==
- Manges Cabin (first Elbo Ranch)
- Hunter Hereford Ranch directly adjacent to the Ramshorn
- Historical buildings and structures of Grand Teton National Park
