= Blacktail Ptarmigan Rocks =

Mountain in Alaska, United States

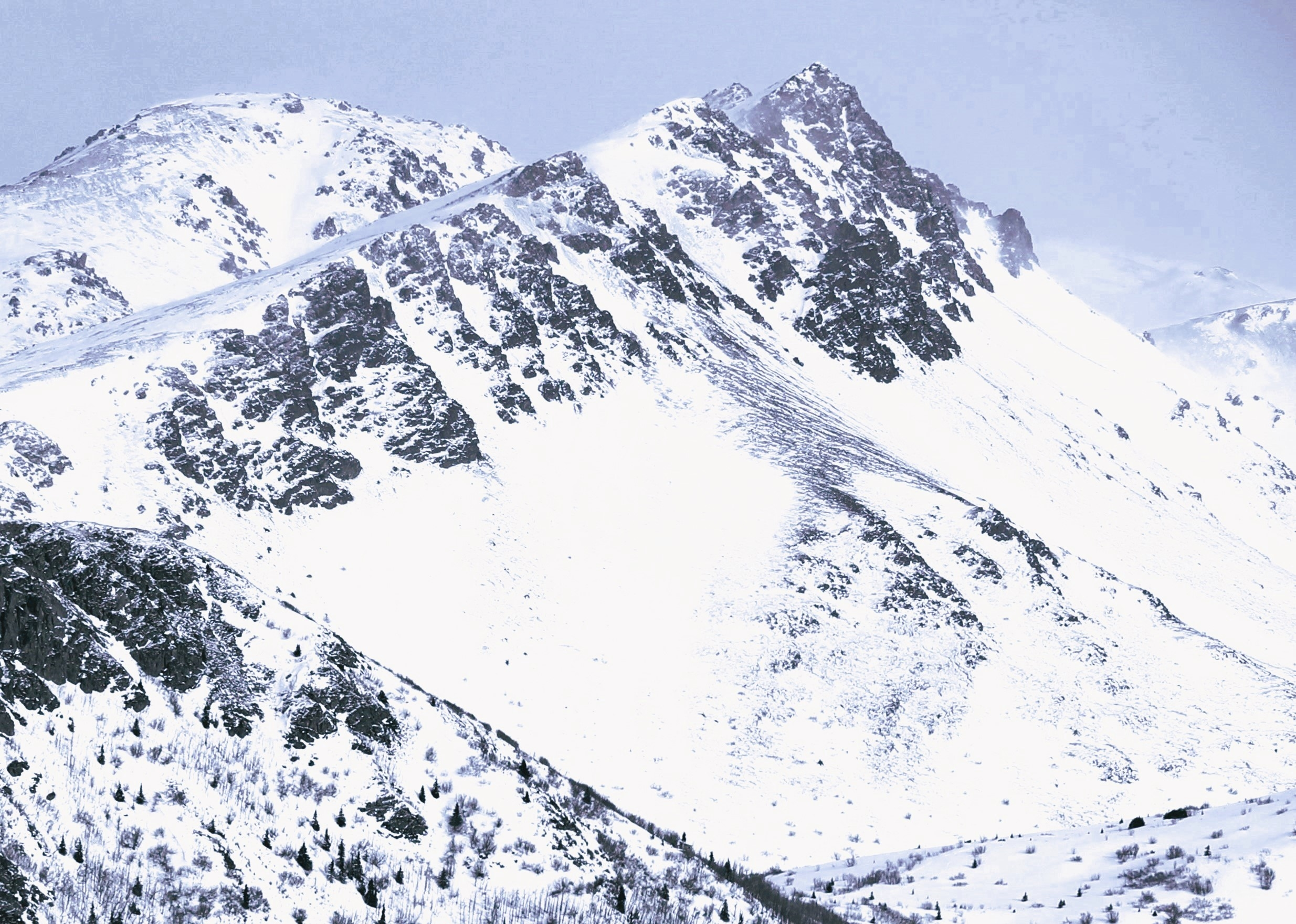
- Southwest aspect (Roundtop behind, left)

Highest point
- Elevation: 4,448 ft (1,356 m)
- Prominence: 427 ft (130 m)
- Parent peak: Roundtop (4,786 ft)
- Isolation: 0.90 mi (1.45 km)
- Coordinates: 61°19′57″N 149°25′49″W

Geography
- Location within Alaska
- Country: United States
- State: Alaska
- Borough: Anchorage
- Protected area: Chugach State Park
- Parent range: Chugach Mountains
- Topo map: USGS Anchorage B-7

Climbing
- Easiest route: Hiking class 2

Blacktail Ptarmigan Rocks is a 4,448-foot (1,356 m) mountain in the U.S. state of Alaska.

== Description ==
Blacktail Ptarmigan Rocks is located five miles (8.0 km) east of the community of Eagle River in the western Chugach Mountains and within Chugach State Park. Precipitation runoff drains to Knik Arm via Peters Creek from the north slope and Meadow Creek from the south slope. Although modest in elevation, relief is significant as the summit rises approximately 2,150 feet (655 m) above Meadow Creek in 0.6 miles (0.97 km). An ascent of the summit involves hiking 7.6 miles (round-trip) and 3,030 feet of elevation gain, with the months of May through October offering the best time for visiting this popular destination. The mountain's toponym appears on USGS maps, but it has not been officially adopted by the United States Board on Geographic Names. This landform is also known locally as "Blacktail Rocks" or "Blacktails." The mountaineer Vin Hoeman named the peak for the dark lichen covering the southern cliffs.

== Climate ==
Based on the Köppen climate classification, Blacktail Ptarmigan Rocks is located in a subarctic climate zone with long, cold, snowy winters, and mild summers. Weather systems are forced upwards by the Chugach Mountains (orographic lift), causing heavy precipitation in the form of rainfall and snowfall. Winter temperatures can drop below 0 °F with wind chill factors below −10 °F.

== See also ==
- List of mountain peaks of Alaska
- Geography of Alaska
