= Jackson Hole =

Valley in Wyoming, U.S.

Coordinates: 43°31′N 110°50′W

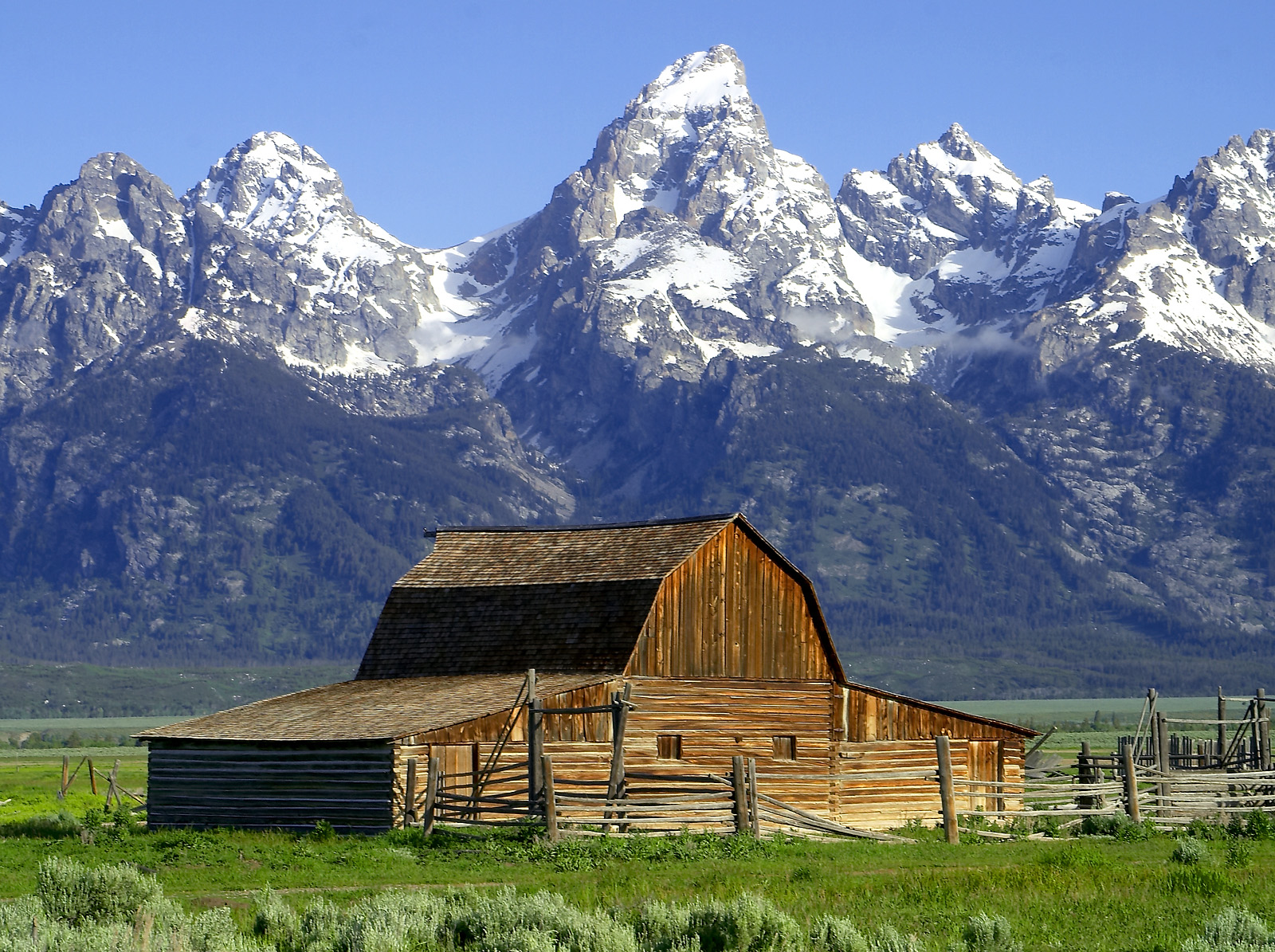
Looking west, the Teton Range rises more than 7,000 feet (2,130 m) above the valley floor with the John Moulton Barn.

Jackson Hole (originally called Jackson's Hole by mountain men or trappers) is a valley between the Gros Ventre and Teton mountain ranges in the U.S. state of Wyoming, near the border with Idaho, in Teton County. The term hole was used by these same early trappers as a term for a large mountain valley. These low-lying valleys, surrounded by mountains and containing rivers and streams, were and are good habitat for beavers and other fur-bearing animals. Jackson Hole is 55 miles (89 km) long by 6-to-13 miles (10-to-21 km) wide and is a graben valley with an average elevation of 6,800 ft (2,100 m), its lowest point being near the southern boundary of Grand Teton National Park at 6,350 ft (1,940 m).

== History ==
The valley was used by Native Americans for hunting and ceremonial purposes. It was not known to harbor year-round human settlement prior to the 1870s. Descriptions of the valley and its features were recorded in the journals of John Colter, who had been a member of the Lewis and Clark Expedition. After returning to the Rocky Mountains, Colter entered the region in 1807 in the vicinity of Togwotee Pass and became the first European-American to see the valley.

The town of Jackson was named in late 1893 by Margaret Simpson, who, at the time, was receiving mail at her home as there was no post office. She named the area in order for easterners to be able to forward mail west. Jackson, which became incorporated in 1914, was named after David Edward "Davy" Jackson, who trapped beaver in the area in the late 1820s with a partner in the firm of Smith, Jackson & Sublette. Jackson, of Irish and Scottish descent, was one of the first European-Americans to spend an entire winter in the valley.

Because the soil is not ideal for raising crops, the valley was used for cattle grazing, and tourism quickly became popular with the establishment of dude ranches.

== Settlements ==
The only incorporated area in the valley is Jackson, located at its southern end. Other communities in the valley include Hoback, Kelly, Moose (Moose Wilson Road), Moran Junction, Teton Village, and Wilson. West of Jackson, Teton Pass crosses the southern end of the Teton Range, providing access to Alta on the western side of the Tetons, as well as Victor and Driggs in Idaho. This area was known as Pierre's Hole and hosted the Rocky Mountain Rendezvous in 1832. Numerous elk use the valley for grazing during the winter, and sleigh rides are offered to tourists. The Jackson Hole Mountain Resort, Snow King, and Grand Targhee Resort ski areas, as well as the nearby Grand Teton and Yellowstone national parks, are major year-round tourist attractions.

== Geography ==
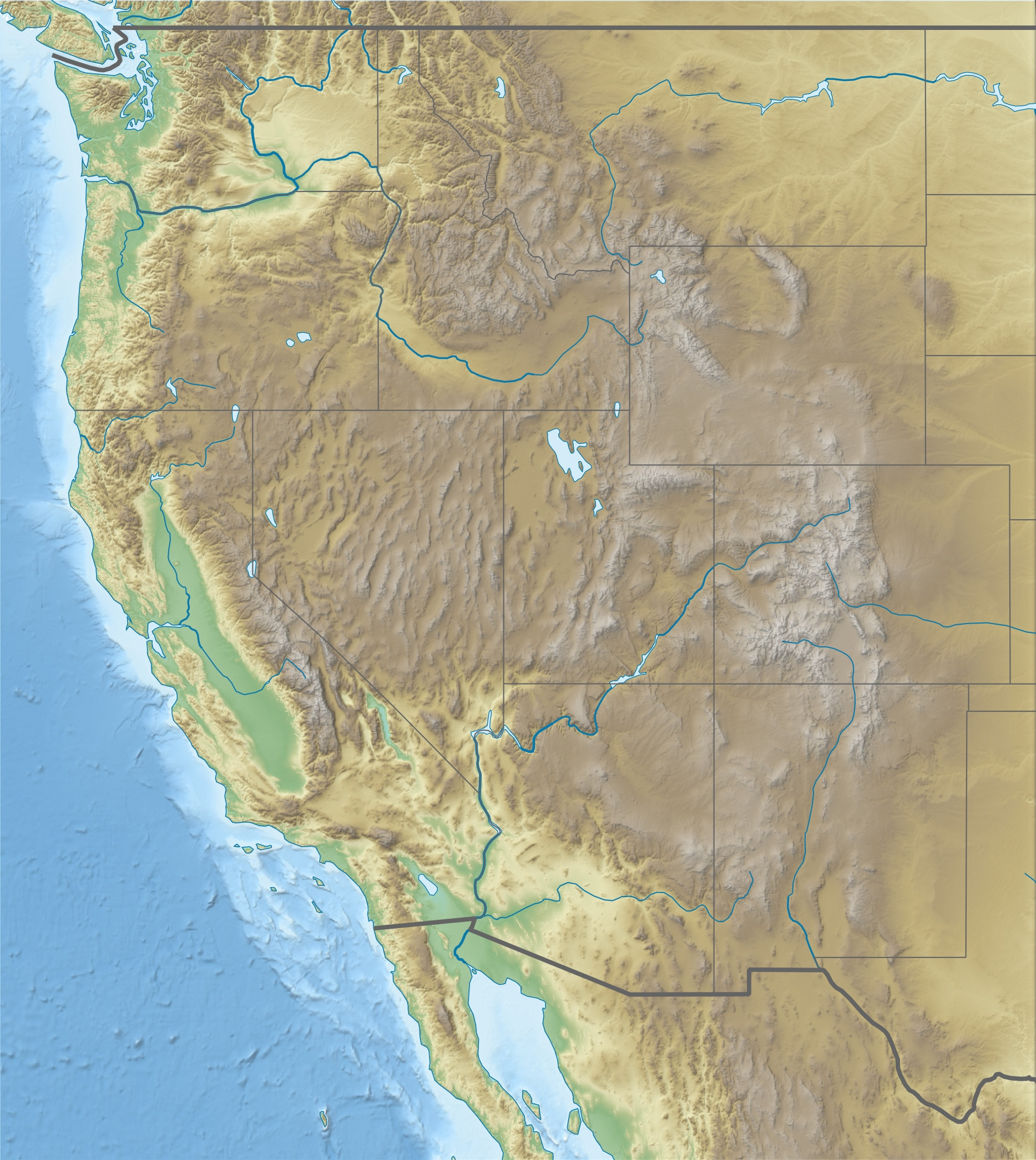
Location in the western United States

The valley is formed by the Teton Range to the west and the Gros Ventre Range to the east. Grand Teton National Park occupies the northwestern part of the valley, encompassing much of the Teton Range and Jackson Lake. The city of Jackson is at the southern end. Between them lies, on U.S. Route 26, "Glacier View Turnout" offering a view of Teton Glacier on the north of Grand Teton, and the National Elk Refuge, home of the largest elk herd on earth. The Snake River threads through the entire valley from its headwater in Yellowstone in the north to the mouth of the Snake River Canyon at the southern tip of the valley. Blacktail Butte is a prominent landform rising from the valley floor. The average elevation of the valley is over 6,500 feet (2,000 m) above sea level.

High altitude and steep mountain slopes on all sides of the valley often cause calm winter nights to be very cold, as radiational cooling from snow-covered ground creates cold air near the surface, which then slides down into the valley due to the higher density of the air. In 1993, this effect during an already severe cold snap plunged the morning low temperature down to −56 °F (−49 °C) in the valley, officially recorded by the National Weather Service. The state record low temperature was also recorded in the valley at Moran at −66 °F (−54 °C) in 1933. Summers are warm to mild, due to the surrounding mountains.

== Economy ==
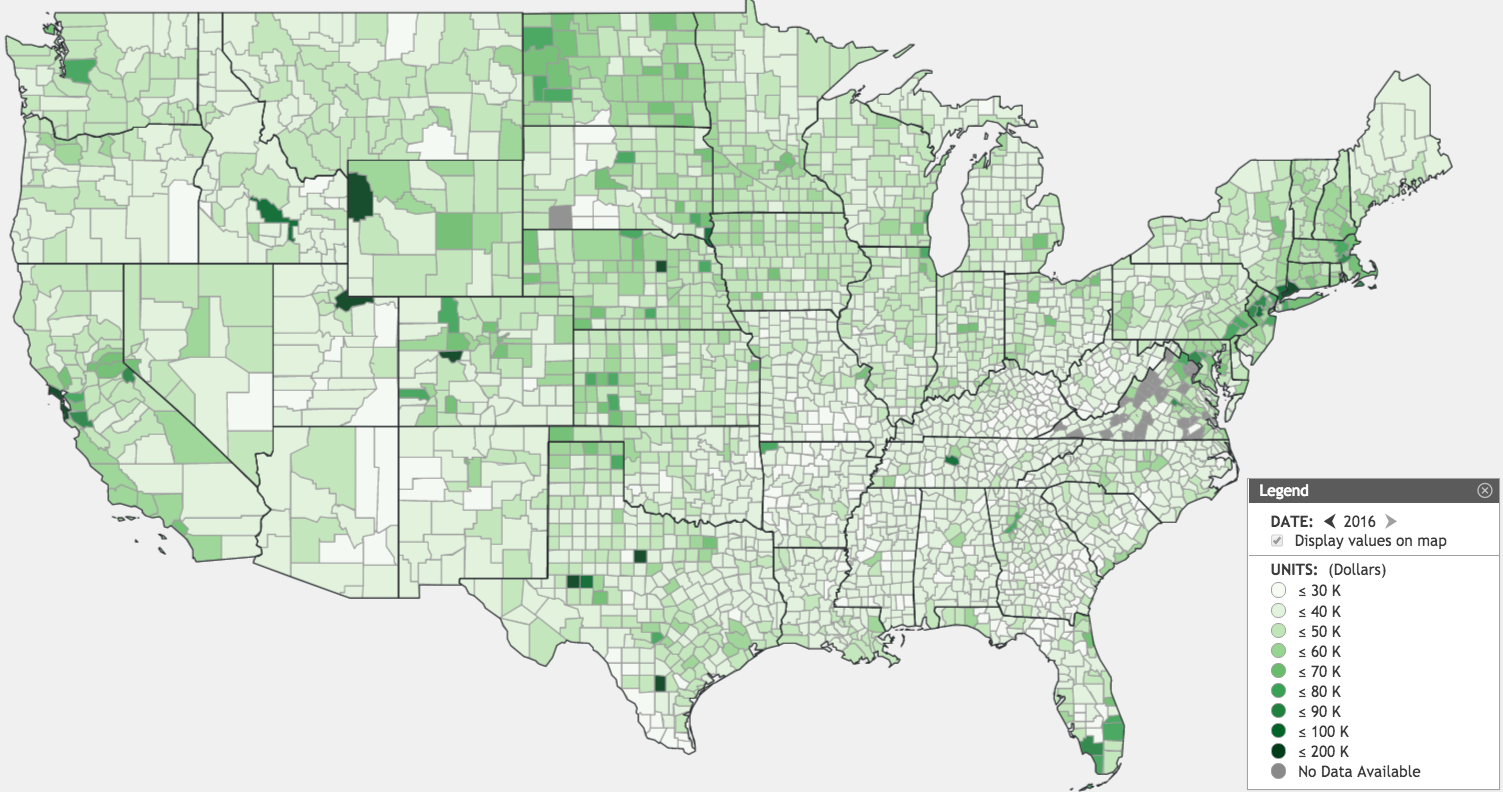
Per capita income by county List of highest-income counties in the United States

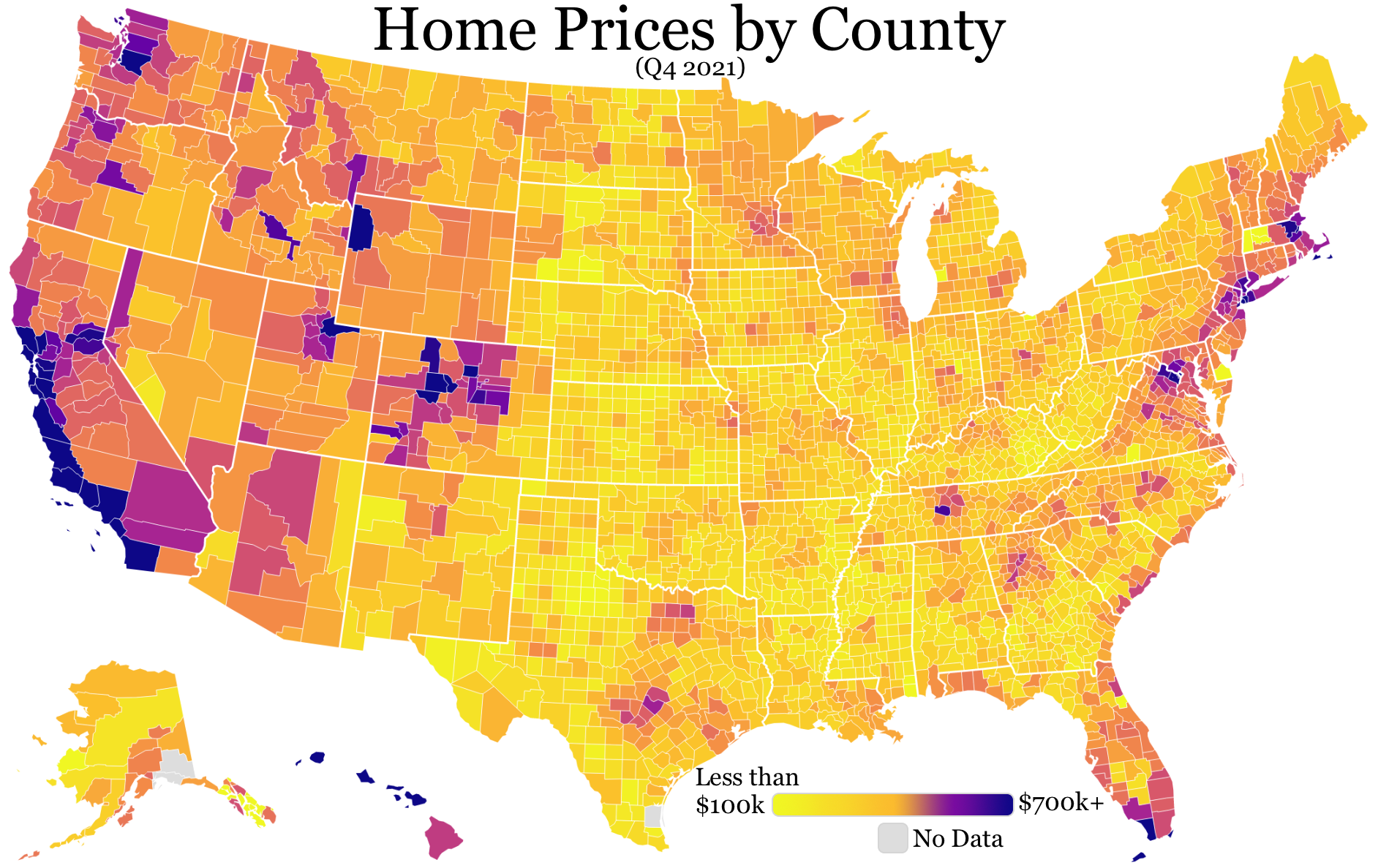
Home prices by county (2021) Teton County has some of the most expensive homes on average <$100,000 $200,000 $300,000 $400,000 $500,000 $500,000 $700,000+

Jackson Hole Airport is the largest and busiest commercial airport in Wyoming. It is also the only airport in the US with airline traffic that is located inside a National Park. Strict noise abatement regulations and the terminal building's low profile allow for the airport to operate within federal guidelines inside Grand Teton National Park. However, it becomes difficult to fly in the winter months. Major airlines serve the valley with jet service, some of which are seasonal (summer and winter).

In 2016, the Jackson Hole Tourism website put up 20 live webcams of Jackson's town square to boost tourism. Since then, the audience of the live screening has grown rapidly, with up to 2,000 people watching at any one time.

The community is also home to the Jackson Hole Economic Symposium, an annual gathering by the Federal Reserve Bank of Kansas City that includes "prominent central bankers, finance ministers, academics, and financial market participants from around the world," according to its description. "The participants convene to discuss the economic issues, implications, and policy options about the symposium topic. The symposium proceedings include papers, commentary, and discussion."

== In popular culture ==
Films set and/or shot in Jackson Hole include 3 Bad Men (1926), The Big Sky (1952), The Wild North (1952), Shane (1953), Spencer's Mountain (1963), Any Which Way You Can (1980), The Mountain Men (1980), Rocky IV (1985), Dances with Wolves (1990), That's It, That's All (2008), and Django Unchained (2012). It is also a major location in the video games The Last of Us (2013) and The Last of Us Part II (2020), as well as the HBO adaptation, in which Jackson itself is home to a large community of survivors in a post-apocalyptic world.

Rapper Kanye West recorded his album Ye (2018) while living in Jackson Hole; the album cover features a picture of the Teton mountains he had taken on his iPhone a few hours before the album's release. Other albums West recorded here include his and Kid Cudi's Kids See Ghosts, Nas's Nasir, Pusha T's Daytona, and Teyana Taylor's K.T.S.E.. These albums are collectively known as the Wyoming Sessions.

C. W. McCall's song "Jackson Hole" is about his journey through the area.

=== Notable people ===
Jackson has become a second home for various celebrities, often due to Wyoming's income tax regime, including Sandra Bullock, RuPaul Charles, Kanye West and Kim Kardashian, Nikki Sixx, and Harrison Ford.

Natives include Kyle Mills, a novelist.

== Gallery ==
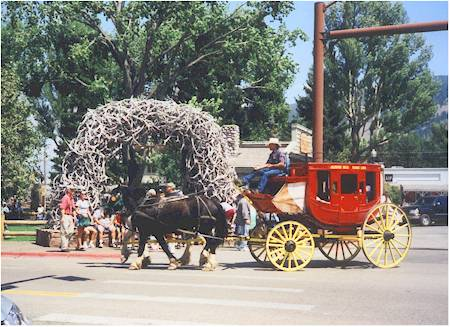
Jackson Square

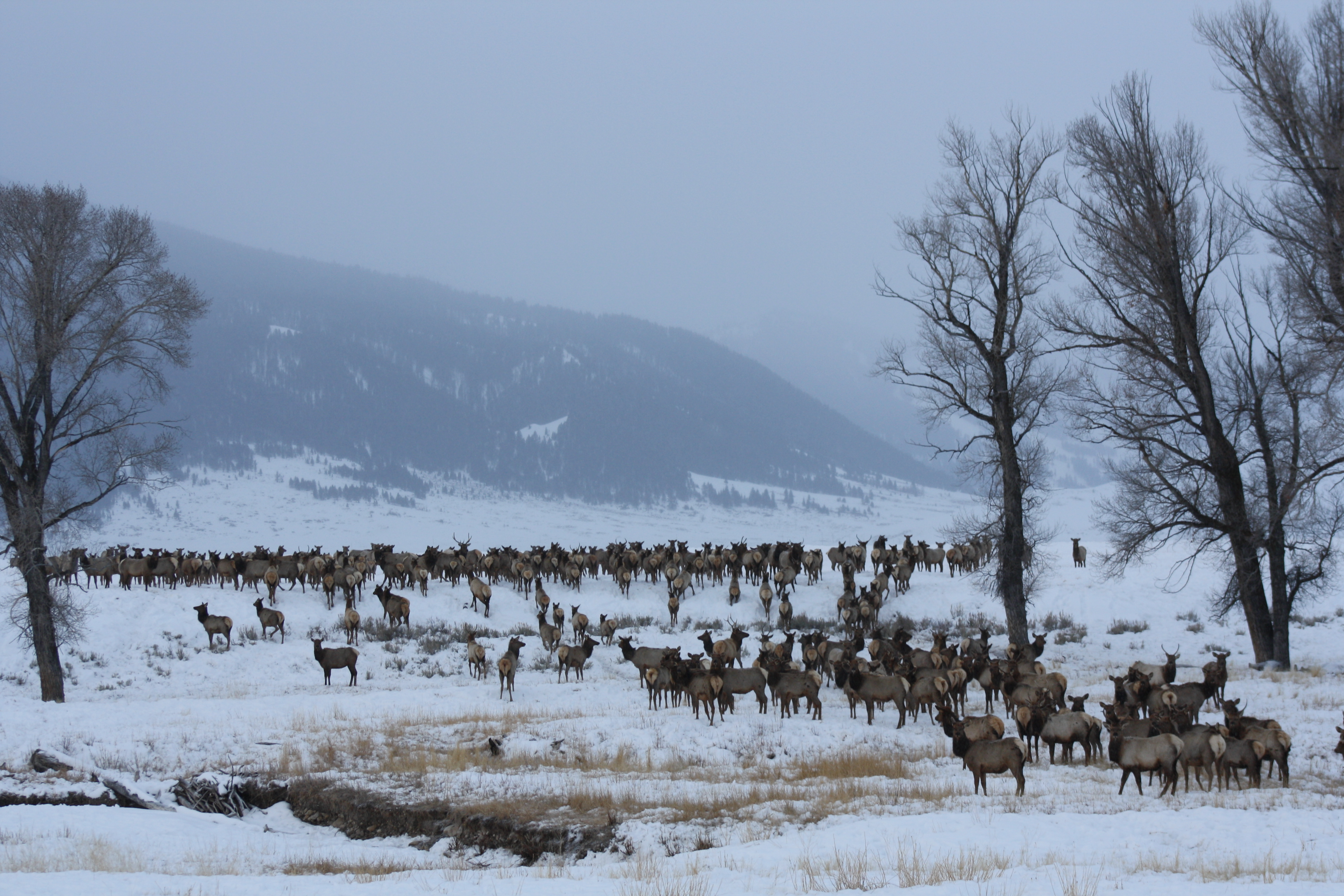
National Elk Refuge

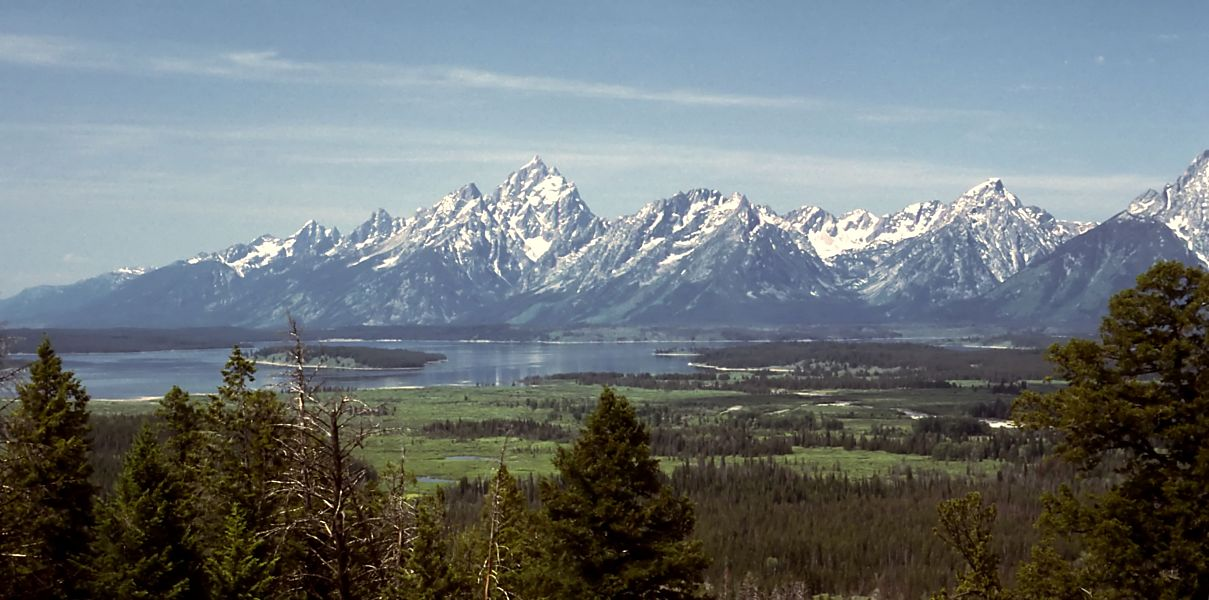
Teton Range

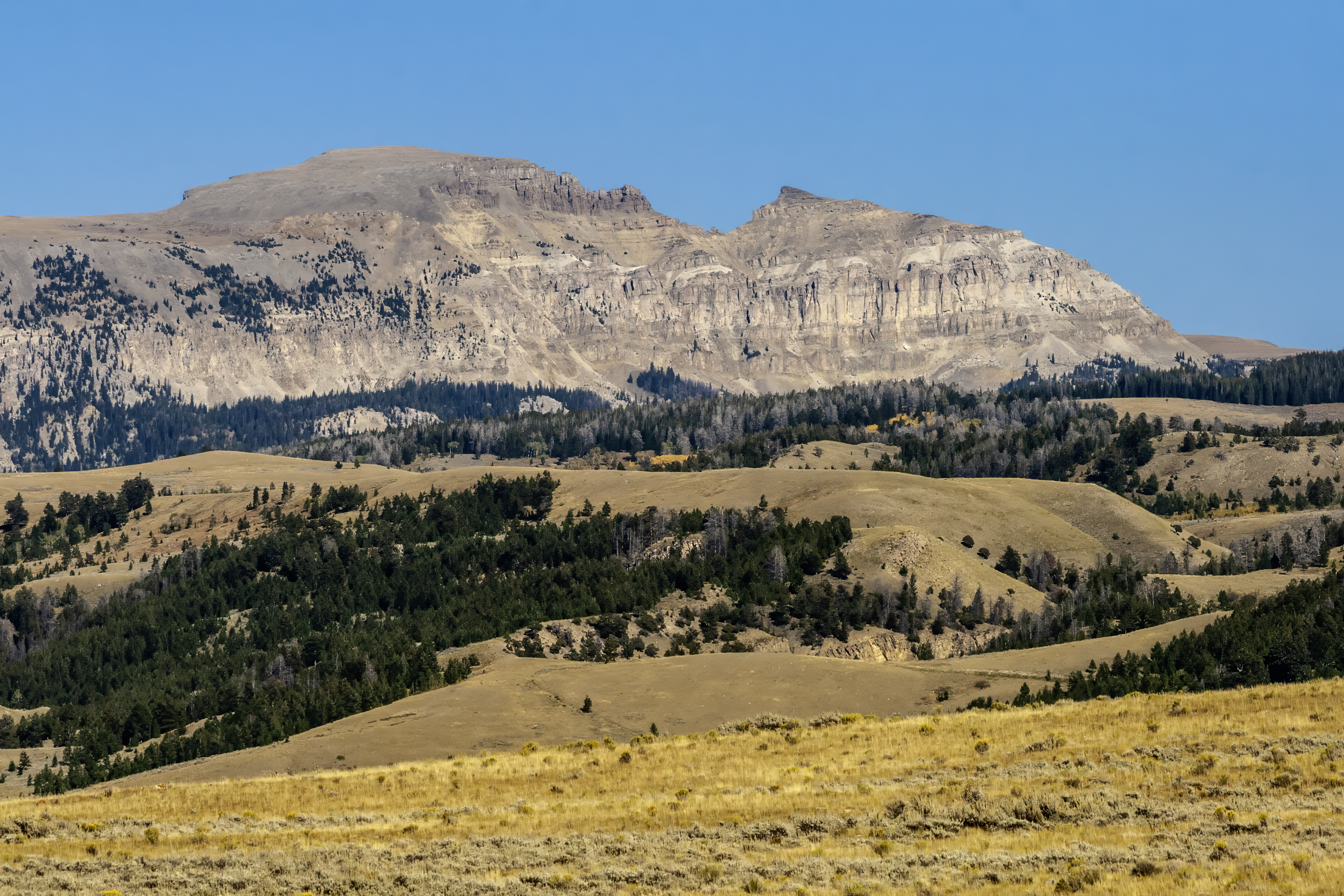
The "Sleeping Indian" series of rock formations on Sheep Mountain

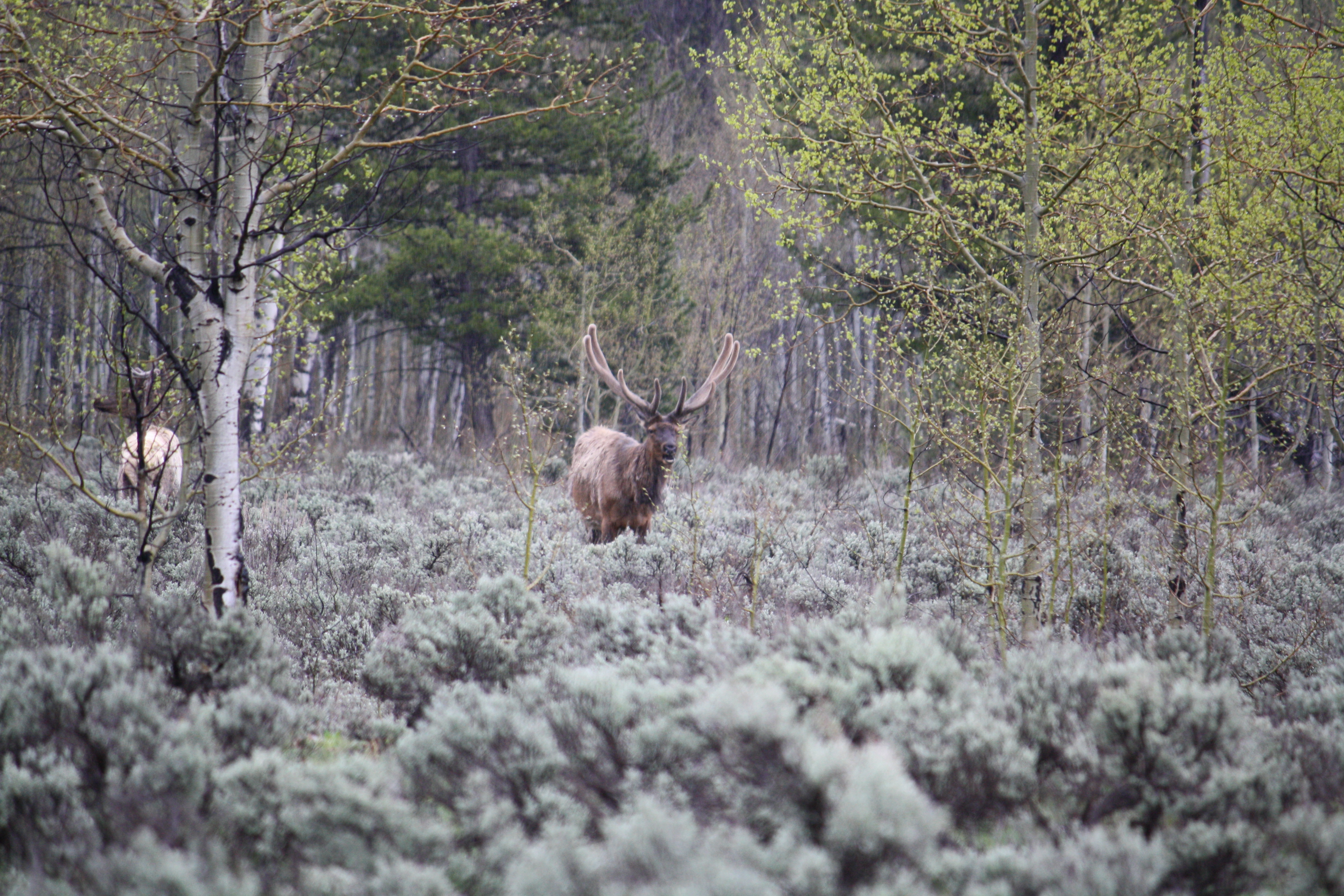
Elk in the wild

== See also ==
- Bannock War of 1895
