= RockResorts =

Hotel brand

- Industry: Hotel, Hospitality
- Founded: 1950s
- Founder: Laurance Rockefeller
- Number of locations: 6 resorts
- Area served: North America
- Parent: Vail Resorts
- Website: www.rockresorts.com

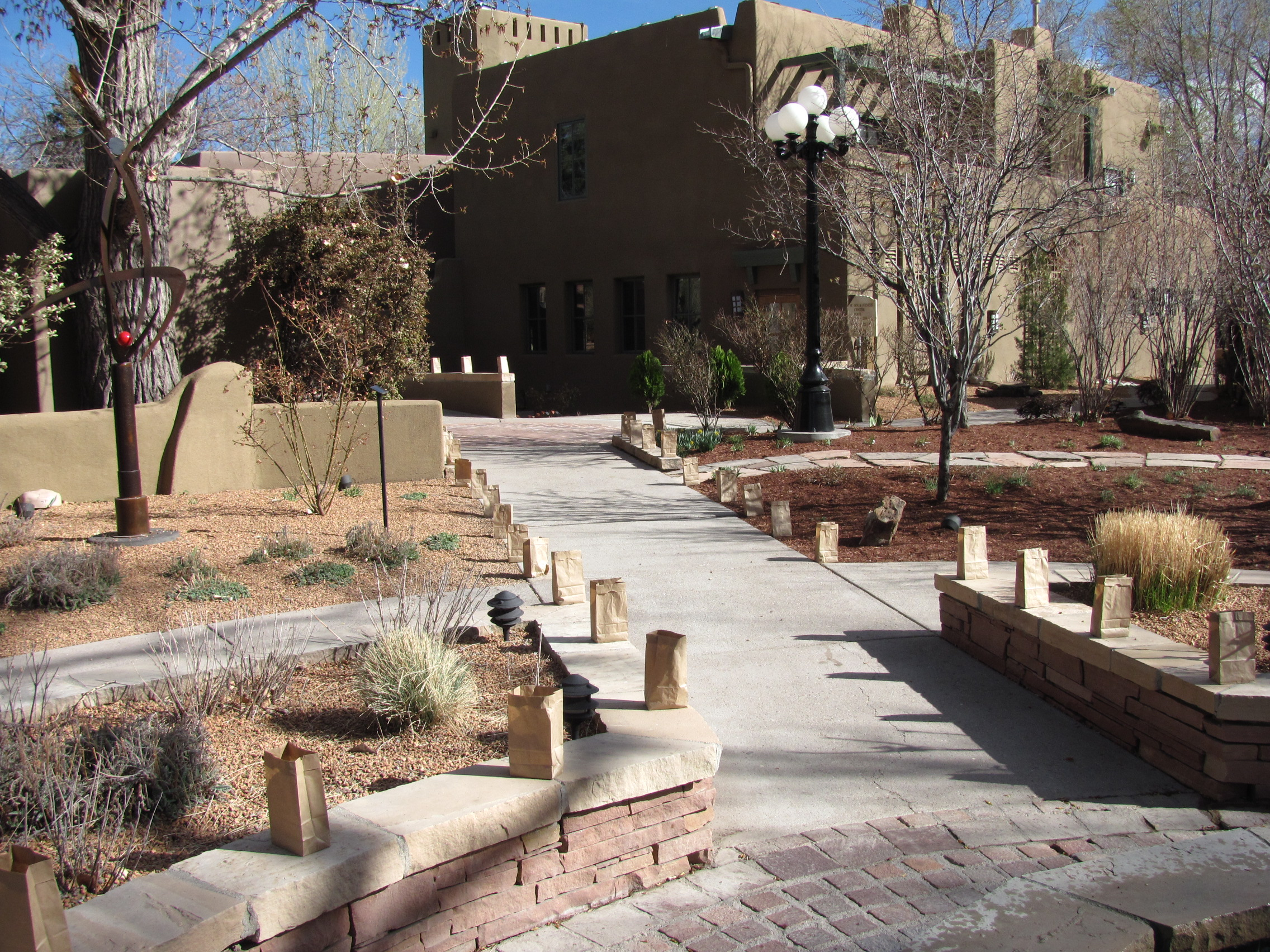
La Posada de Santa Fe

RockResorts is a hotel brand with roots in the 1950s. Laurance Rockefeller, founder, began building a series of resorts in 1956 with the establishment of Caneel Bay on St. John in the United States Virgin Islands. Early properties included the Grand Teton Lodge Company (which, with the Jackson Lake Lodge and Jenny Lake Lodge, actually preceded Caneel Bay), Dorado Beach Hotel and Golf Club in Dorado, Puerto Rico, Little Dix Bay on Virgin Gorda and Mauna Kea Beach Hotel. At some point in the early to mid-1960s, Rockefeller and others began referring to his collection of resort properties as RockResorts. Additional RockResorts during this time included the Woodstock Inn in Woodstock, Vermont, which opened on November 23, 1969, and The Boulders in Carefree, Arizona.

The company was sold to railroad company CSX, which combined it with its hotel resort The Greenbrier. In 1986, CSX sold the brand, and the original hotel companies were dispersed, though The Greenbrier remained.

In 1999, the RockResorts brand was acquired by Olympus Hospitality, and later acquired by Vail Resorts in 2001. Today, the brand is headquartered in Broomfield, Colorado.
