= Colter Bay Village =

Developed area of Grand Teton National Park, Wyoming, USA

Coordinates: 43°54′14.95″N 110°38′29.33″W

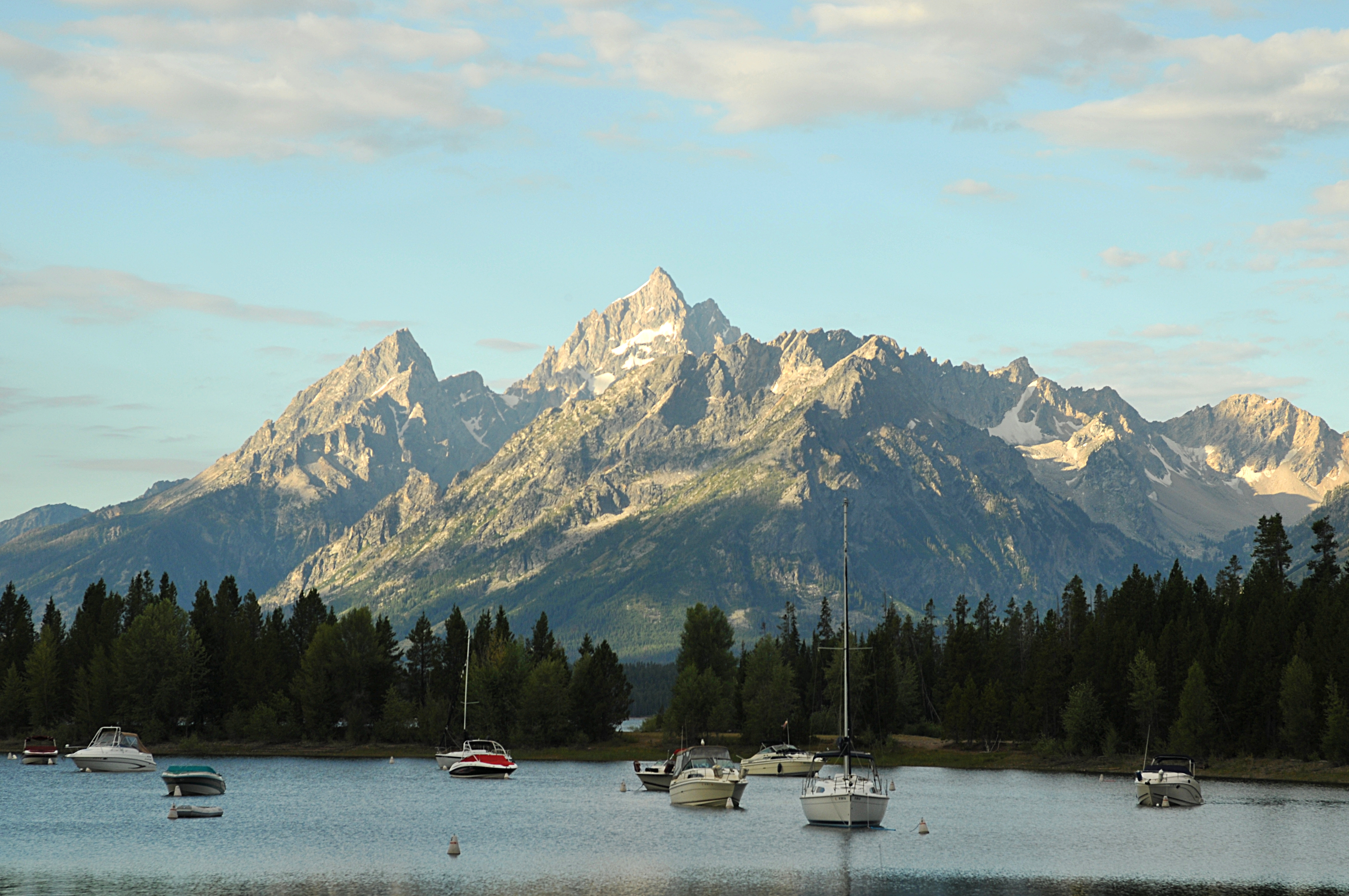
Colter Bay with Grand Teton in the background

Colter Bay Village is a developed area of Grand Teton National Park, Wyoming, USA. Located on the northeast side of Jackson Lake, it was built starting in the 1950s as part of the National Park Service's Mission 66 program to expand park visitor services and to adapt them to the requirements of automobile tourism. Hiking trails in the area include the Colter Bay Lakeshore Trail and the Heron Pond Swan Lake Trail.

The Colter Bay development includes a campground with 250 sites, a visitor center, marina and 208 units of log and tent cabins. 166 of the cabins were relocated to the site from other places in Jackson Hole. Many of them came from Ben Sheffield's Moran Ranch, a dude ranch which was removed from its site at Moran in 1955 by the Park Service and the Grand Teton Lodge Company.

Colter Bay Village is operated by the Grand Teton Lodge Company, which also operates the Jackson Lake Lodge and Jenny Lake Lodge in the park.
