= Heron Pond Swan Lake Trail =

Hiking trail in Grand Teton National Park, Wyoming

Coordinates: 43°53′06″N 110°38′10″W

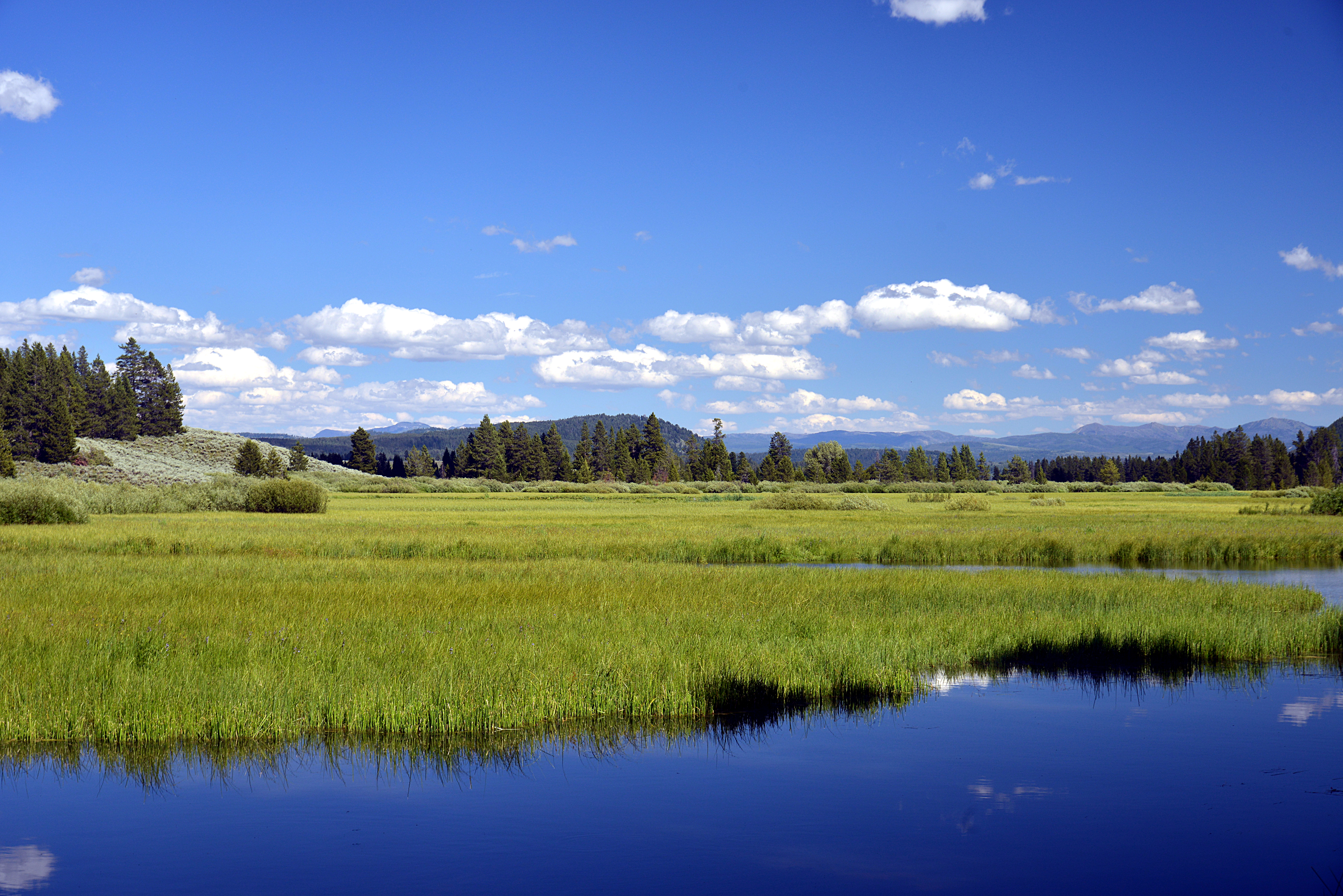
- Swan Lake
- Length: 5.5 mi (8.9 km)
- Location: Jackson Hole
- Trailheads: Colter Bay Village; Jackson Lake Lodge
- Use: Hiking
- Elevation change: Approximate gain of 300 ft (91 m)
- Highest point: Jackson Lake Lodge, 7,000 ft (2,100 m)
- Lowest point: Colter Bay Village, 6,796 ft (2,071 m)
- Difficulty: Easy
- Season: Late Spring to Fall
- Sights: Teton Range
- Hazards: Severe weather

The Heron Pond Swan Lake Trail is a 5.5-mile (8.9 km) long hiking trail in Grand Teton National Park in the U.S. state of Wyoming. From the Hermitage Point trailhead, a number of trails include short loop hikes around Heron Pond and Swan Lake and a longer hike of 5.5 miles (8.9 km) one-way connects Colter Bay Village with Jackson Lake Lodge. The trails are over easy terrain and provide excellent wildlife viewing opportunities.

== See also ==
List of hiking trails in Grand Teton National Park
