= Moran, Wyoming =

Moran
- Unincorporated community
- Location within the state of Wyoming Moran (the United States)
- Coordinates: 43°50′30″N 110°30′28″W
- Country: United States
- State: Wyoming
- County: Teton
- Elevation: 6,749 ft (2,057 m)
- Time zone: UTC-7 (Mountain (MST))
  - Summer (DST): UTC-6 (MDT)
- ZIP codes: 83013
- GNIS feature ID: 1604433

Moran (also Moran Junction) is an unincorporated community in south central Teton County, Wyoming, United States, which serves as one of the principal fee collection entrances to Grand Teton National Park. It lies in Grand Teton National Park northeast of the city of Jackson, the county seat of Teton County, at the intersection of U.S. Routes 26, 89, 191 and 287. Its elevation is 6,749 feet (2,057 m). As the community has had two different names, the Board on Geographic Names officially ruled in favor of "Moran" in 1970. Although Moran is unincorporated, it has a post office, with the ZIP code of 83013.

Moran is part of the United States Census Bureau's Jackson, WY–ID Micropolitan Statistical Area; and it is known as the state's coldest continuously inhabited place, with a record low of -63 °F (-52 °C) registered in the winter of 1933. The high altitude at which the community is located, as well as the effects of radiational cooling, cause particularly severe conditions in the winter.

== Education ==
Public education in the community of Moran is provided by Teton County School District #1. Schools serving the community include Moran Elementary School (grades K-5), Jackson Hole Middle School (grades 6–8), and Jackson Hole High School (grades 9–12).

== History ==
Ed "Cap" Smith and Clara Smith established a homestead at Moran in the 1890s, but found themselves catering to travelers on the road to Yellowstone National Park to the north, or to Idaho on the Marysville Road. The Smiths built a two-story log hotel. Their neighbors, the Allens, built the Elkhorn Hotel, which housed the post office and a store. The Smith hotel burned around November 1900.

The town was named by the Allens after Mount Moran, which is one of the largest and most prominent peaks of the Teton Range and lies directly west of Moran across Jackson Lake. Mount Moran is itself named after painter and explorer Thomas Moran, who visited the region in the 1870s.

Moran began to grow after 1903, when Ben D. Sheffield bought two homesteads on the Snake River and built up an outfitting business at the location, called the Teton Lodge Resort. A toll bridge over the Snake, possibly operated by Sheffield, was a major link in the local transportation network. Sheffield also operated the Moran post office from 1907 to 1919. His brother Edward ran the Flagg Ranch farther north, just outside Yellowstone National Park. The Sheffield ranch's lodge, which housed the post office, burned in 1916. A replacement lodge was built circa 1922. The Sheffield complex of cabins comprised the bulk of the town. In 1928, Sheffield sold out to the Snake River Land Company (SRLC), which renovated and expanded the facility, in part to head off new development in the area. The SRLC established the Teton Lodge Company to operate the ranch, which expanded to a capacity of 200 guests. The main lodge was destroyed by fire in 1935. The remaining cabins, and thus most of the community, were moved to Jackson Lake Lodge in 1955.

The construction of Jackson Lake Dam from 1910 to 1916 temporarily made Moran a much larger town, with a construction encampment built by the Reclamation Service to the north of the Sheffield ranch.

During the location shooting of 1930's The Big Trail, the cast and crew travelled to Wyoming. The location was quite primitive and the only lodging available to them were a couple of trappers cabins. The crew set about building more cabins (which would be needed for specific scenes as well as lodging), and John Wayne helped build some of those cabins. The site later became the community of Moran.

== Climate ==
According to the Köppen Climate Classification system, Moran has a subarctic climate, abbreviated "Dfc" on climate maps. The hottest temperature recorded in Moran was 94 °F (34 °C) on July 13, 2026, while the coldest temperature recorded was −63 °F (−53 °C) on February 9, 1933.

Climate data for Moran, Wyoming, 1991–2020 normals, extremes 1911–present
Month	Jan	Feb	Mar	Apr	May	Jun	Jul	Aug	Sep	Oct	Nov	Dec	Year
Record high °F (°C)	51 (11)	60 (16)	62 (17)	74 (23)	82 (28)	92 (33)	94 (34)	92 (33)	87 (31)	80 (27)	64 (18)	53 (12)	94 (34)
Mean maximum °F (°C)	39.4 (4.1)	44.0 (6.7)	54.3 (12.4)	63.5 (17.5)	73.2 (22.9)	81.4 (27.4)	87.0 (30.6)	86.0 (30.0)	80.8 (27.1)	69.8 (21.0)	52.5 (11.4)	40.4 (4.7)	88.0 (31.1)
Mean daily maximum °F (°C)	24.0 (−4.4)	29.5 (−1.4)	38.6 (3.7)	46.2 (7.9)	56.4 (13.6)	67.0 (19.4)	76.9 (24.9)	76.0 (24.4)	66.3 (19.1)	51.0 (10.6)	34.7 (1.5)	24.1 (−4.4)	49.2 (9.6)
Daily mean °F (°C)	12.6 (−10.8)	16.7 (−8.5)	25.2 (−3.8)	33.8 (1.0)	43.4 (6.3)	52.0 (11.1)	59.5 (15.3)	58.2 (14.6)	49.9 (9.9)	37.8 (3.2)	24.3 (−4.3)	14.1 (−9.9)	35.6 (2.0)
Mean daily minimum °F (°C)	1.2 (−17.1)	3.9 (−15.6)	11.8 (−11.2)	21.4 (−5.9)	30.5 (−0.8)	37.0 (2.8)	42.2 (5.7)	40.4 (4.7)	33.6 (0.9)	24.7 (−4.1)	13.9 (−10.1)	4.0 (−15.6)	22.0 (−5.5)
Mean minimum °F (°C)	−23.3 (−30.7)	−22.5 (−30.3)	−13.7 (−25.4)	4.6 (−15.2)	18.1 (−7.7)	27.4 (−2.6)	33.2 (0.7)	30.8 (−0.7)	22.9 (−5.1)	9.8 (−12.3)	−5.8 (−21.0)	−18.7 (−28.2)	−27.5 (−33.1)
Record low °F (°C)	−52 (−47)	−63 (−53)	−43 (−42)	−28 (−33)	5 (−15)	18 (−8)	23 (−5)	19 (−7)	7 (−14)	−11 (−24)	−28 (−33)	−50 (−46)	−63 (−53)
Average precipitation inches (mm)	2.90 (74)	2.31 (59)	2.34 (59)	2.16 (55)	2.36 (60)	1.75 (44)	1.02 (26)	1.28 (33)	1.64 (42)	1.92 (49)	2.61 (66)	3.10 (79)	25.39 (646)
Average snowfall inches (cm)	39.5 (100)	28.2 (72)	22.0 (56)	11.7 (30)	2.9 (7.4)	0.3 (0.76)	0.0 (0.0)	0.0 (0.0)	0.4 (1.0)	6.5 (17)	23.5 (60)	39.9 (101)	174.9 (445.16)
Average precipitation days (≥ 0.01 in)	14.2	12.4	11.5	11.9	12.2	10.2	7.1	8.2	7.7	9.7	12.3	14.8	132.2
Average snowy days (≥ 0.1 in)	13.6	11.2	9.3	7.1	1.8	0.1	0.0	0.0	0.1	3.2	9.3	14.0	69.7
Source 1: NOAA
Source 2: National Weather Service
