= Colter Bay Lakeshore Trail =

Hiking trail in Grand Teton National Park in the U.S.

Coordinates: 43°53′48″N 110°38′57″W

- Length: 2 mi (3.2 km)
- Location: Jackson Hole
- Trailheads: Colter Bay Village
- Use: Hiking
- Elevation change: Approximate gain of 200 ft (61 m)
- Highest point: On trail, 6,850 ft (2,090 m)
- Lowest point: Colter Bay Village, 6,780 ft (2,070 m)
- Difficulty: Easy
- Season: Late Spring to Fall
- Sights: Teton Range; Jackson Lake
- Hazards: Severe weather

The Colter Bay Lakeside Trail is a 2-mile (3.2 km) roundtrip hiking trail in Grand Teton National Park in the U.S. state of Wyoming. From the Colter Bay Marina trailhead, two short loop hikes from Colter Bay Village are connected by a causeway. The trail follows the shoreline of Jackson Lake with the Teton Range off to the west across the lake.

== See also ==
- List of hiking trails in Grand Teton National Park
