= Caneel Bay =

Resort in St. John, US Virgin Islands

Coordinates: 18°20′37″N 64°47′6″W

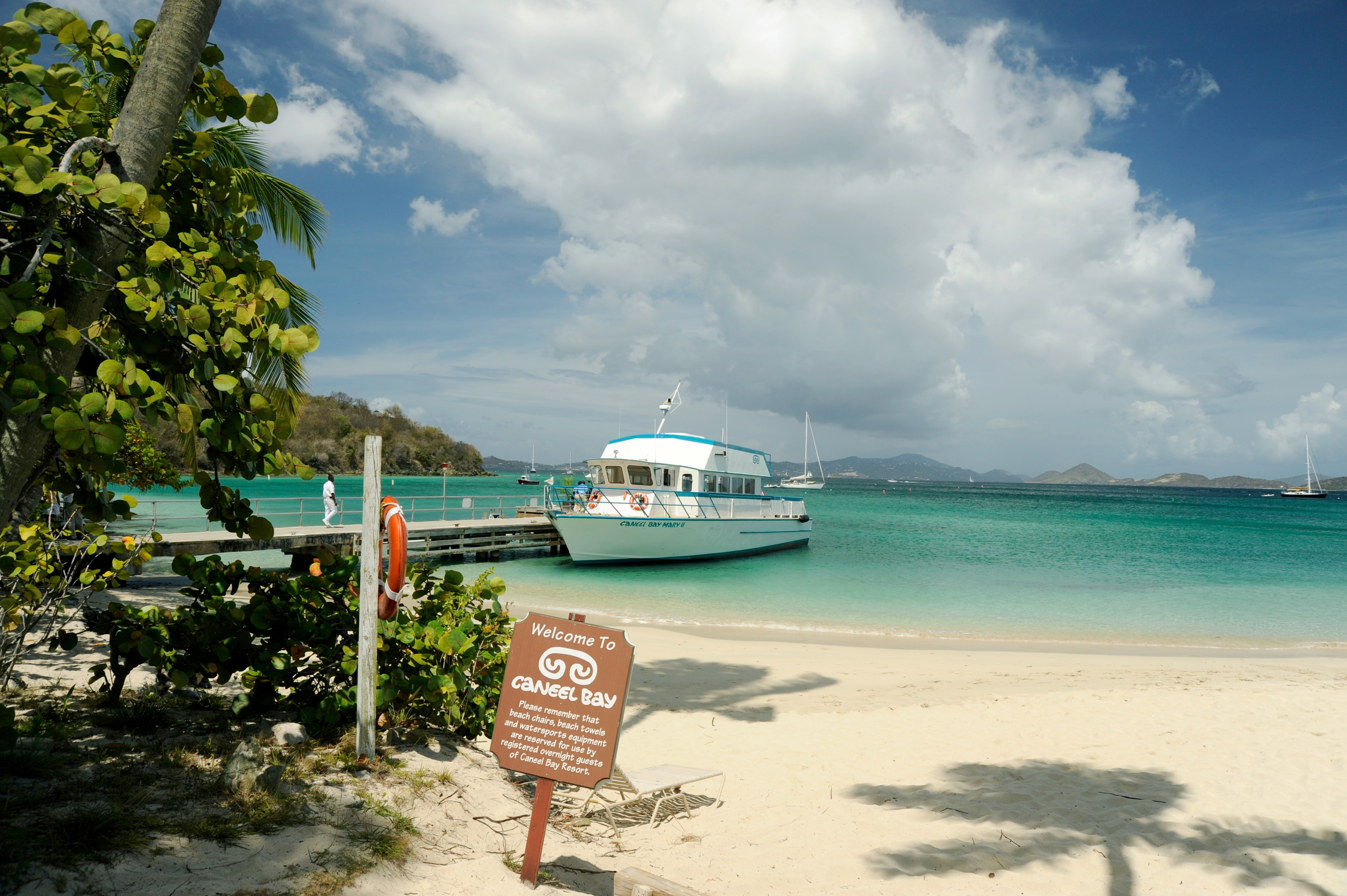
Caneel Bay

Caneel Bay was a resort set on a 170-acre peninsula in the Virgin Islands National Park. The resort, near picturesque beaches, is a vacation destination in the Caribbean. It is located on the northwest side of St. John, US Virgin Islands. The resort is within Virgin Islands National Park, on property once owned by Laurance Rockefeller, and operates under a unique agreement with the US National Park Service. The RUE (retained use estate) agreement (which Rockefeller himself drafted language for) enables the resort to operate with a unique tax-free, rent-free status since 2004.

== History ==
=== Danish West Indies ===
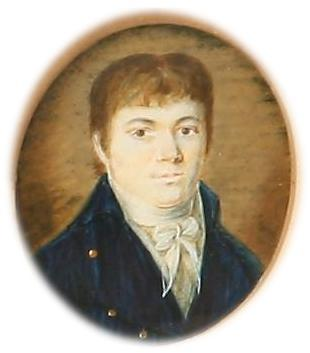
Peter Duurloo (1756–1795)

A plantation known as Little Cinnamon Bay was formerly located on the site. It belonged to Peter Durlo. Some of his neighbors sought refuge on his plantation during the 1733 slave insurrection on St. John. The plantation was later passed down to his son Petter Duurloo (1732–1779) and grandson Peter Donlo (1756–1795). The latter was married to Helene van Uytendael, baronesse de Brettonm daughter of oplanter Johannes Balthazar van Uytendaele, baron de Bretton and Helena Molijn. The estate was later passed to their son Johannes Durlo (1783–1840). He sold it and moved to Denmark, settling on the Lille Egede estate.

=== Rockefeller Era ===
After visiting St. John in 1952, Laurance Rockefeller was so impressed by the area's beauty that he arranged to buy most of the island of St. John including the 573-acre Caneel Bay Plantation,

Rockefeller subsequently donated most of the land—approximately 60% of the island of St. John—to the U.S. government for the creation of the Virgin Islands National Park, the 29th U.S. national park. The donation was finalized and celebrated in a ceremony on December 1, 1956.

Rockefeller began building the first "environmentally friendly resort" on the bay." Rockefeller had the resort buildings designed to blend in with the landscape, and most property lighting is indirect to better enable guests to see the stars at night. The hotel built was one of the early members of Rockefeller's hotel chain, Rockresorts. The Caneel Bay resort takes its name from the location of the property (Caneel means cinnamon in old Dutch).

In a letter drafted by Rockefeller in 1988, he states:

"I am concerned that the Park Service may be asked to extend the term of the Retained Use Estate, which would have the effect of enriching the seller and defeating the foundation's intent to add the Caneel property to the park as scheduled," wrote Rockefeller. "Caneel Bay is a very special site of outstanding scenic beauty which we believe should be protected and made available to the public as part of Virgin Islands National Park. We have been working together with the Park Service for over thirty years to achieve this end, but ultimately, your successors will determine whether and when the public will have the opportunity to enjoy the site as we intended."

Caneel Bay was a Rosewood Resort until the fall of 2013. The resort was a member of Leading Hotels of the World until it was devastated by a hurricane in 2017. Caneel Bay, prior to Hurricane Irma in 2017, was open 10 months a year (annual closure in September and October), and provided a variety of activities such as snorkeling and scuba diving. A diversity of marine life can be found in the area's waters. Parrotfish, angelfish, and damselfish can be seen swimming around coral, bright sea fans or spiny sea urchins. Viewers may also spot a barracuda, sea turtle or reef squid. The resort has not been cleaned-up or rebuilt after the hurricane's extensive damage, due to the high cost of rebuilding and an uncertain outcome of lease negotiations with the US National Park Service. Proposals were submitted to redevelop the land and negotiate a new agreement with the US National Park service to once again operate a resort upon the land, providing much-needed jobs and other endowments to the island residents.

In December 2020, EHI Acquisitions, LLC, a subsidiary of CBI Acquisitions, and the US Department of the Interior reached an agreement to move forward with negotiations to redevelop the Caneel Bay property.

As of January 2021, petitions were organized to lobby to rebuild Canneel Bay.

== Hurricane damage and rebuilding ==
Caneel Bay sustained extensive damage during 2017's hurricane Irma, and has not been rebuilt; however, the resort's owner, CBI Acquisitions, is entertaining architectural plans to rebuild in an environmentally-friendly and more sustainable manner to "honor Laurance Rockefeller's legacy". CBI has conditioned any re-building on the guarantee that a new lease on the property be negotiated in order to substantiate the significant investment in rebuilding the resort. CBI has operated the resort at Caneel Bay rent-free since 2004, in an agreement with the National Park Service that is set to expire on September 30, 2023.

The Caneel Purpose Group offered a proposal to rebuild the iconic hotel, donate money to the US National Park Service, and create high-wage jobs for island residents as well as offer a culinary school, additional vocational training and other collaborative-style offerings for the community at large.

== Environmental contamination ==
As far back as 2014, some research suggest chemical contamination from the use of pesticides and building materials at the resort.

In 2020, a Colorado-based attorney with a home on St. John, USVI filed a lawsuit against CBI Acquisitions (the firm running the resort since 2004) and the US Department of Interior (under which the National Park Service operates) -- claiming environmental contamination at Caneel Bay from the use of DDT and asbestos that may have been buried on the property. Other environmental contaminations suspected at Canneel Bay are arsenic, mercury, and hydrocarbons tied to fuel.

David Giacomo, the suing attorney, suggests that Caneel Bay should be a designated World Heritage site, based on the claims of slave quarters rumored to be on the property.

== Gallery ==
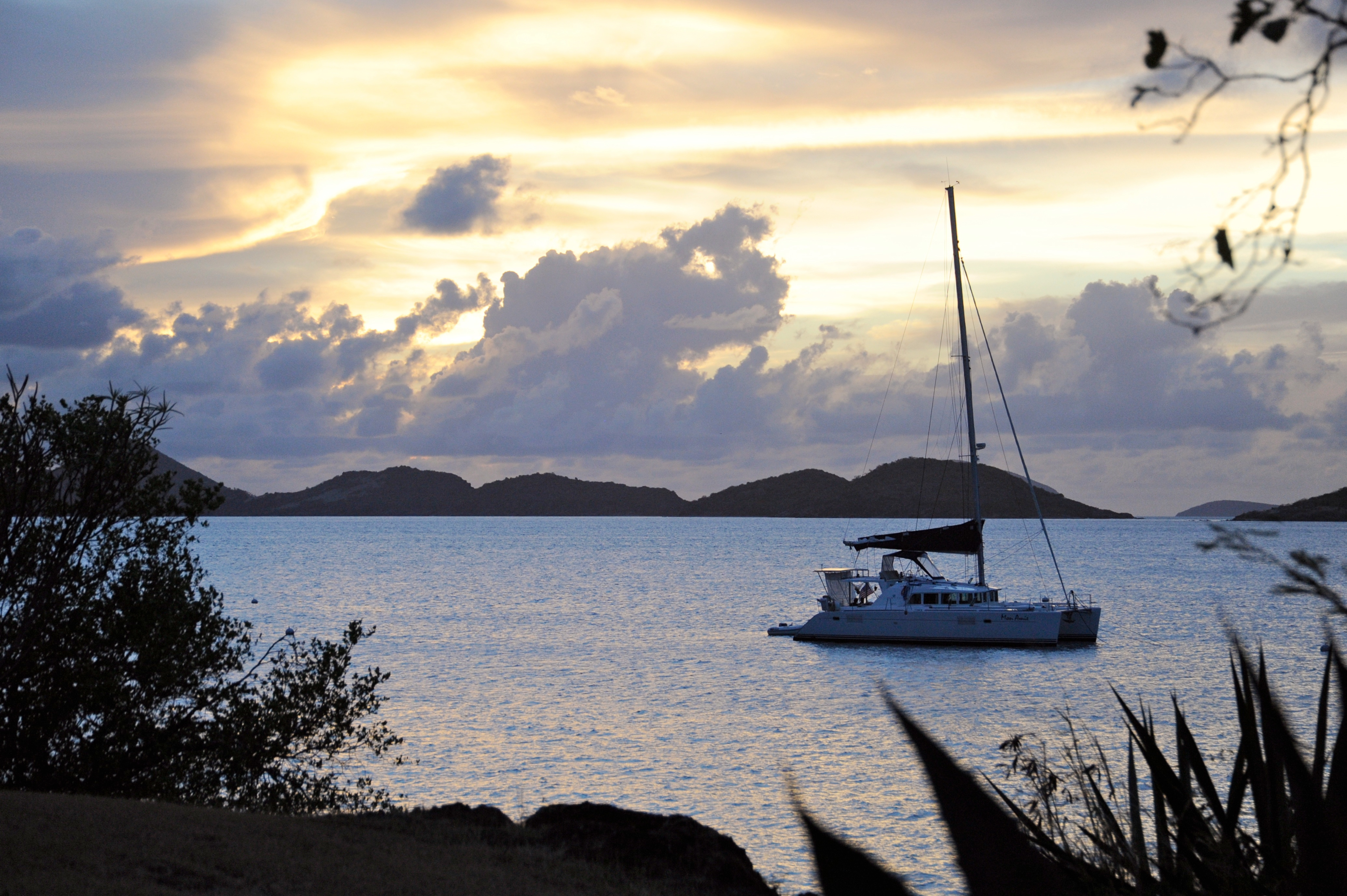

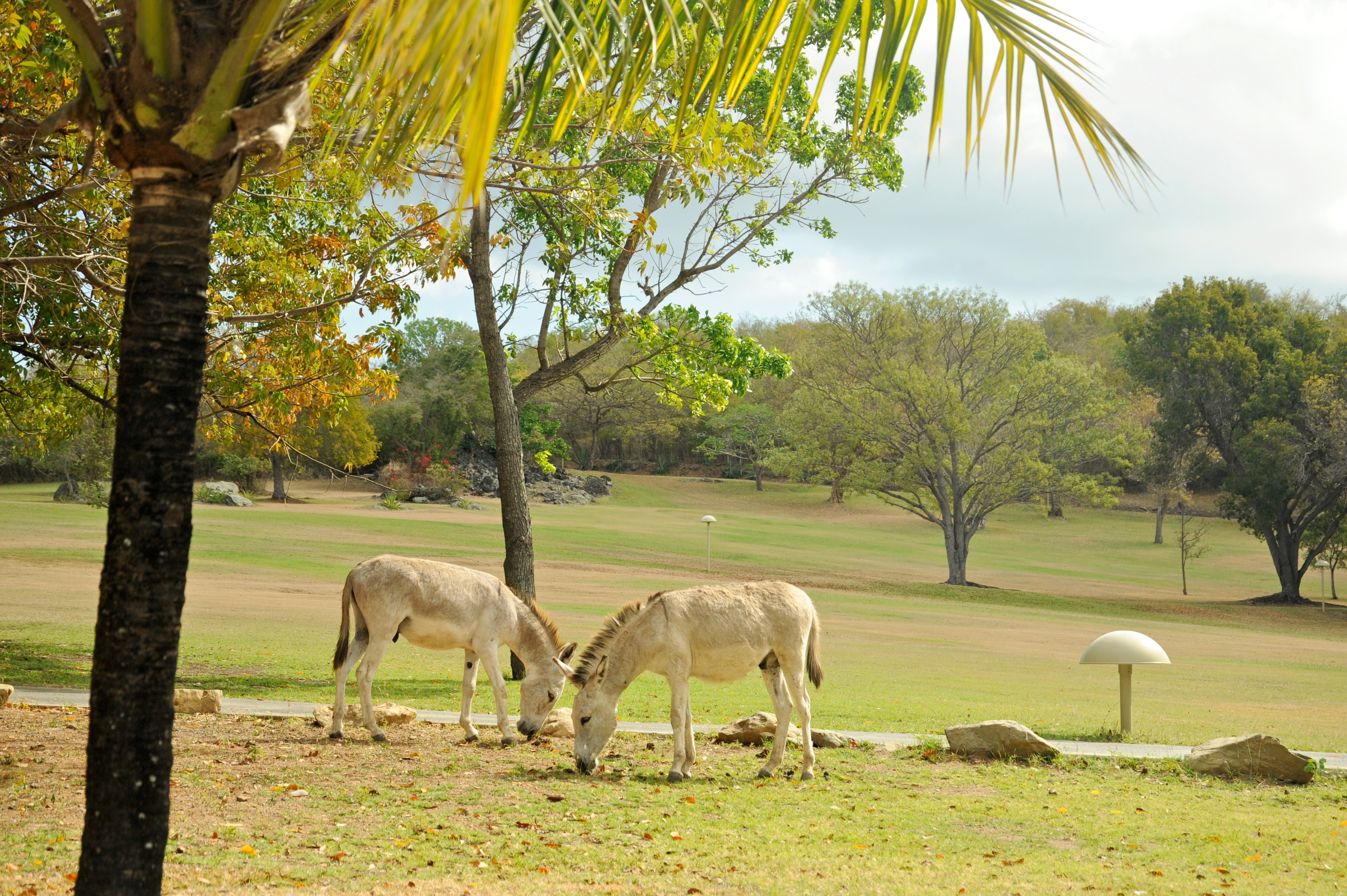

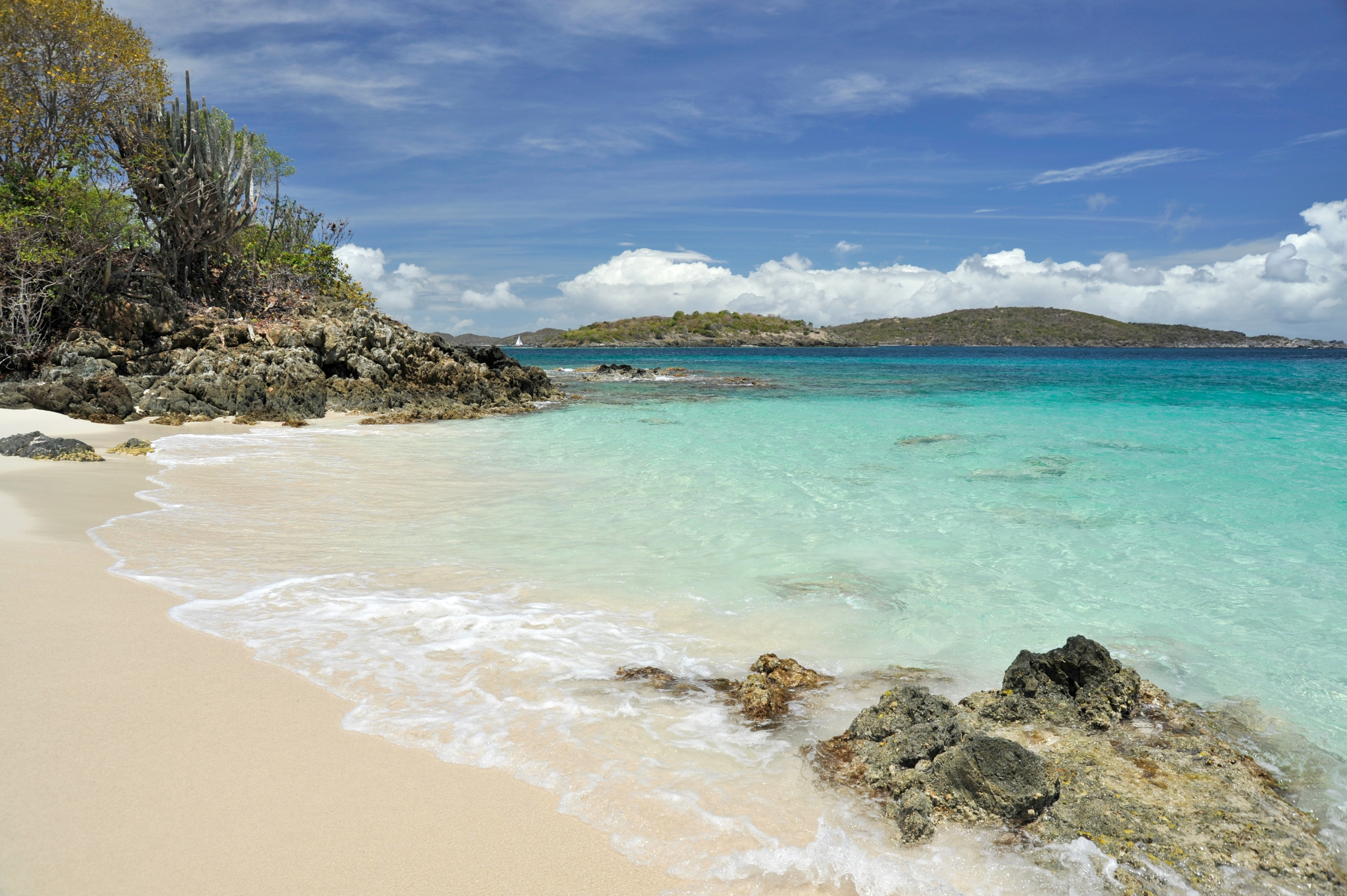

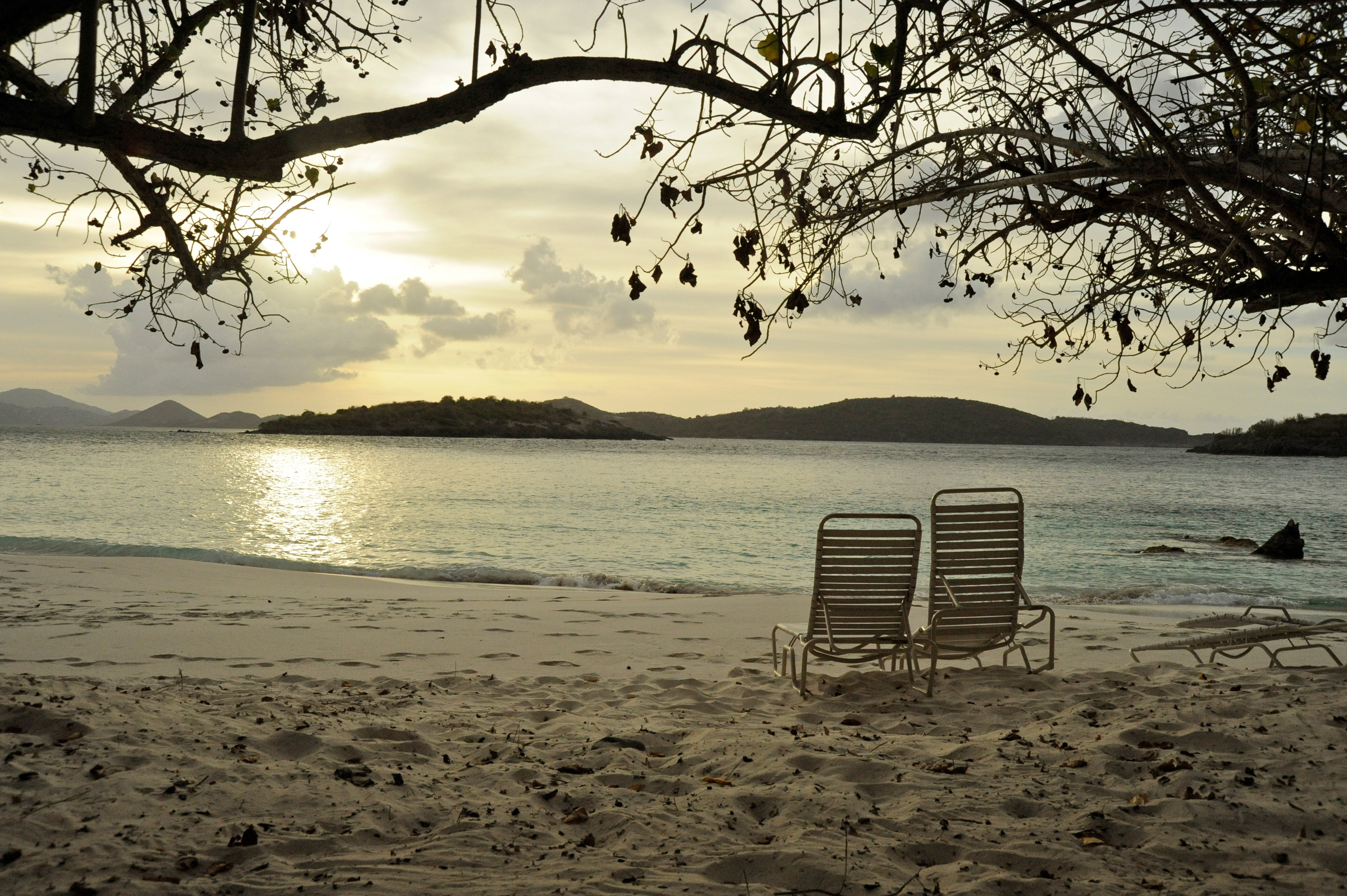

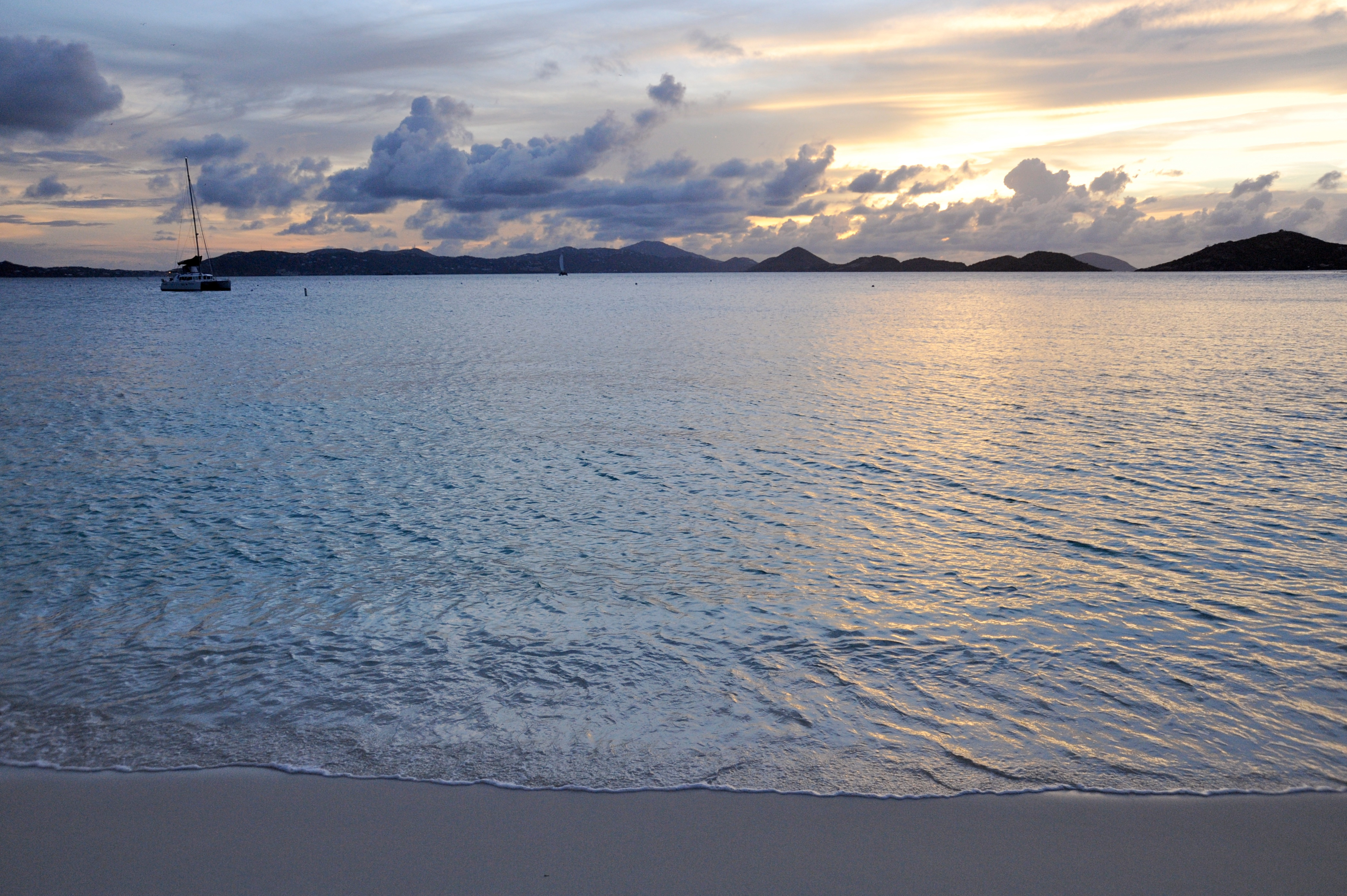

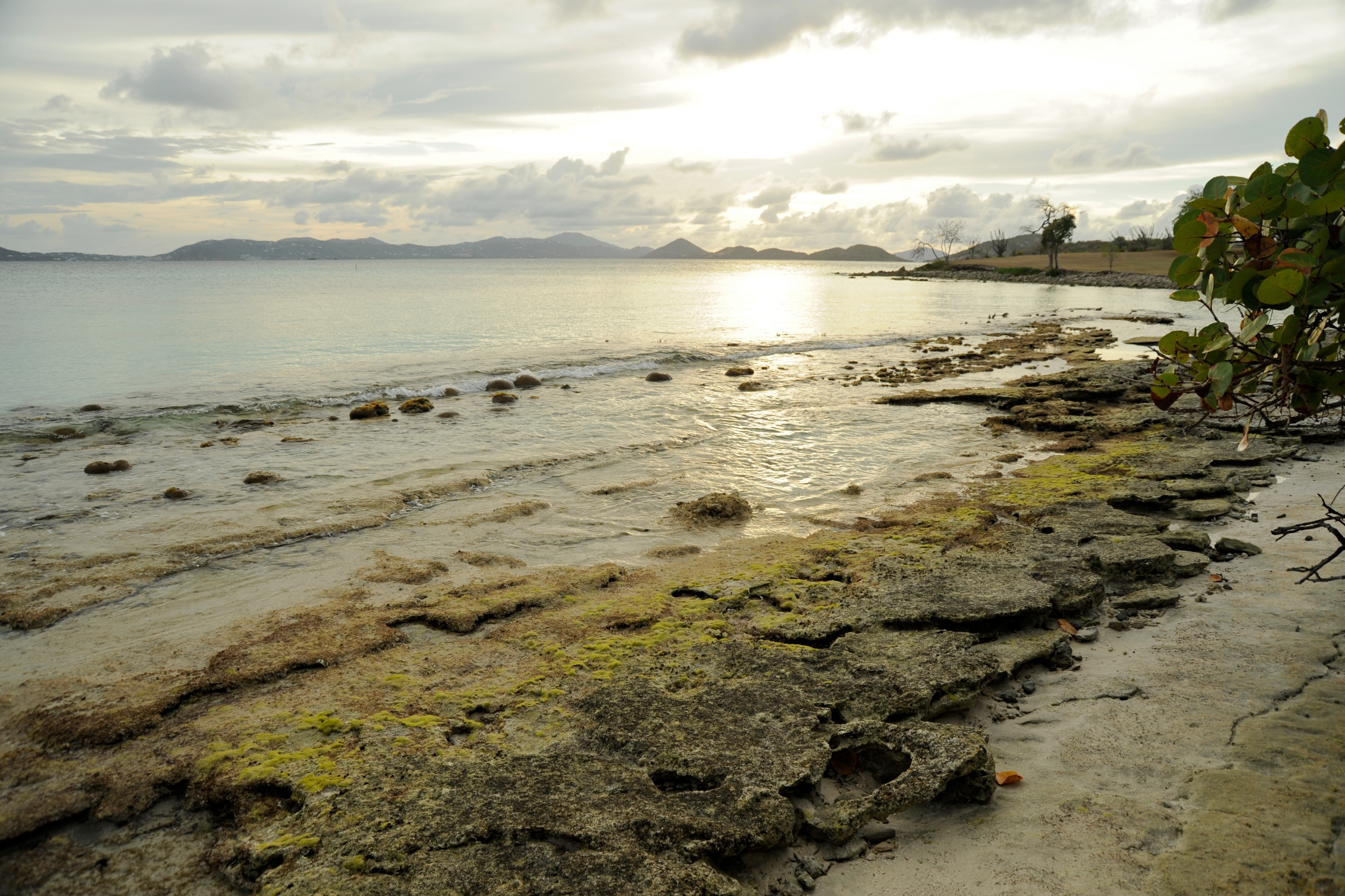

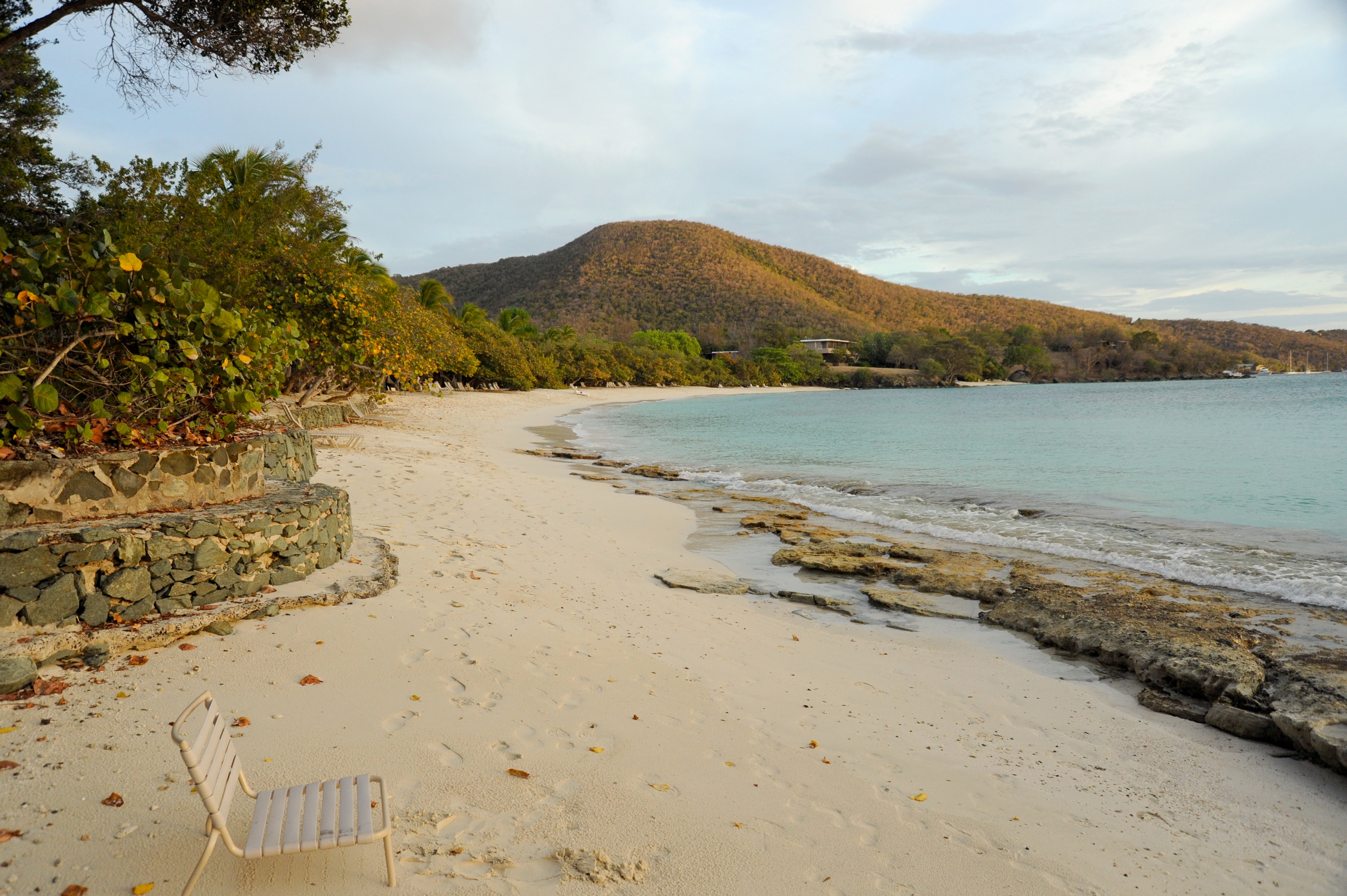

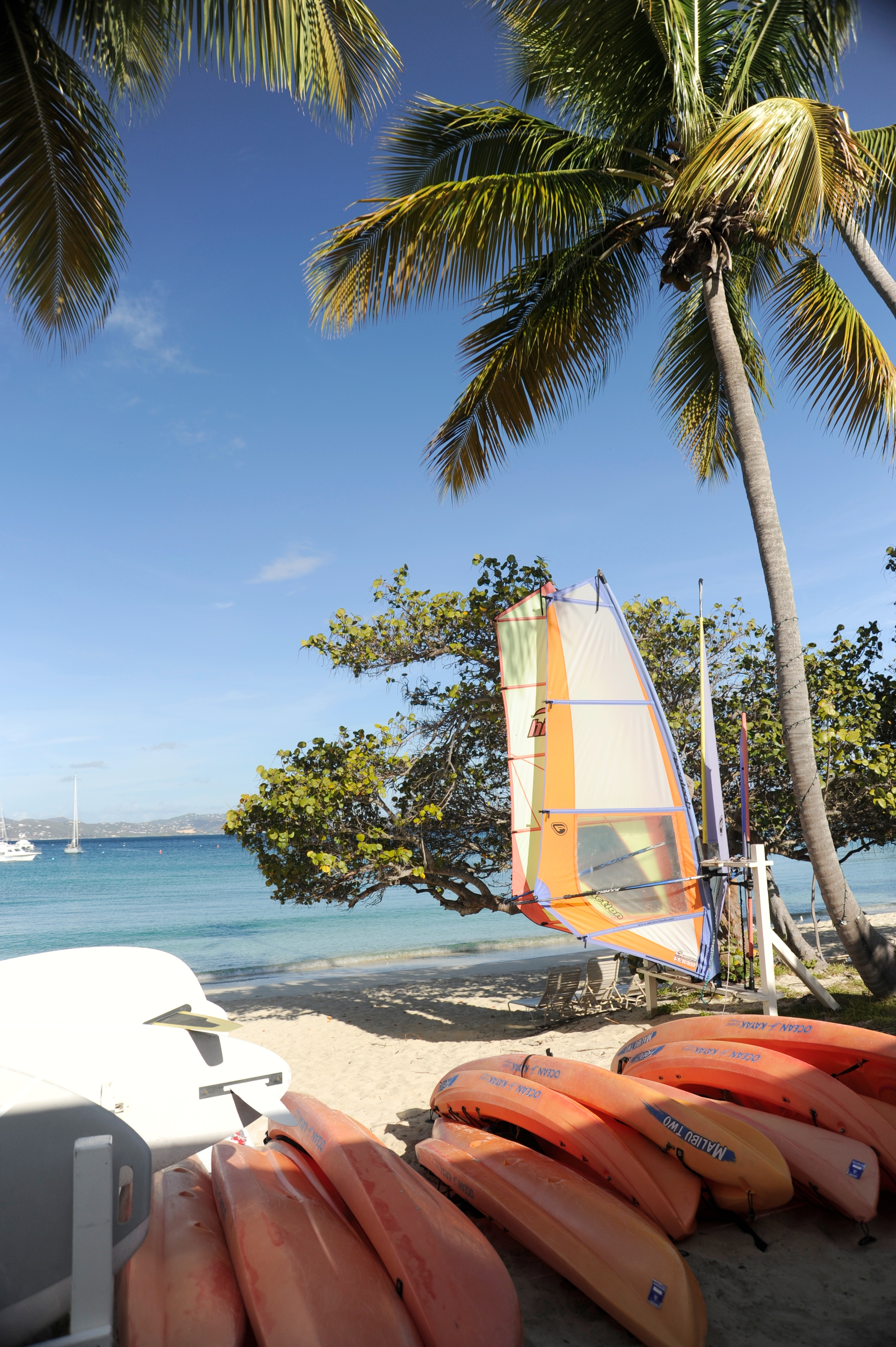

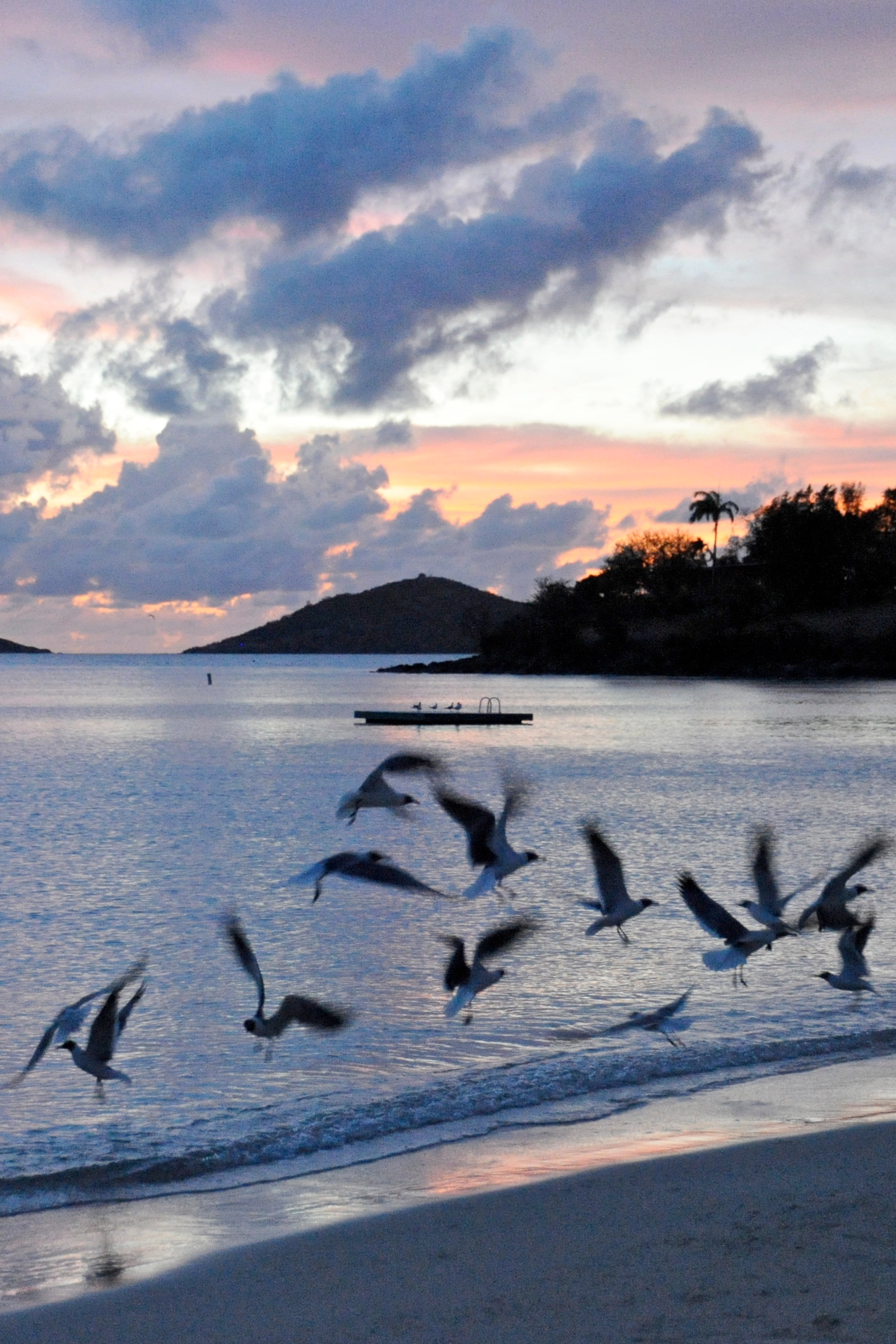

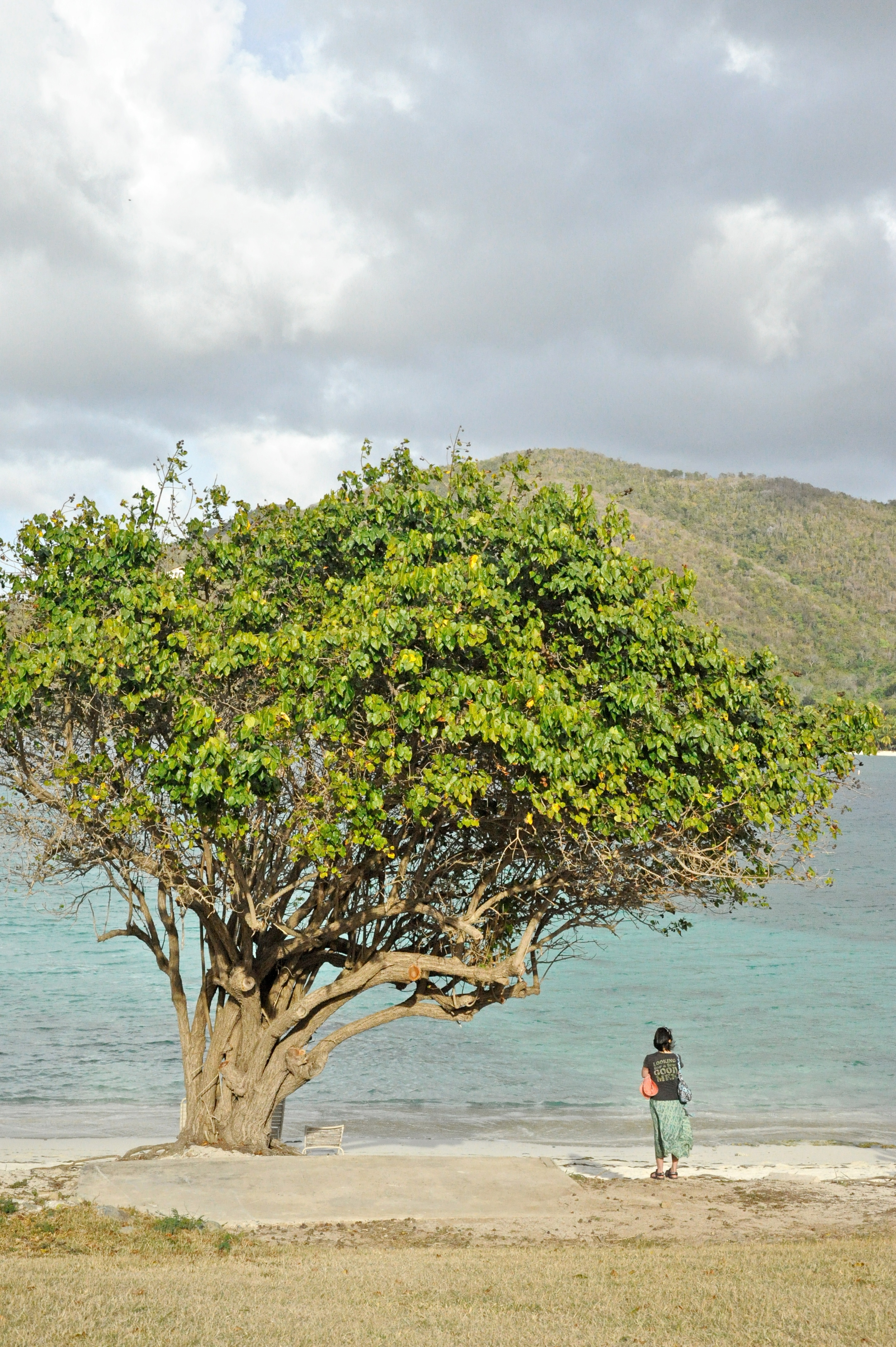

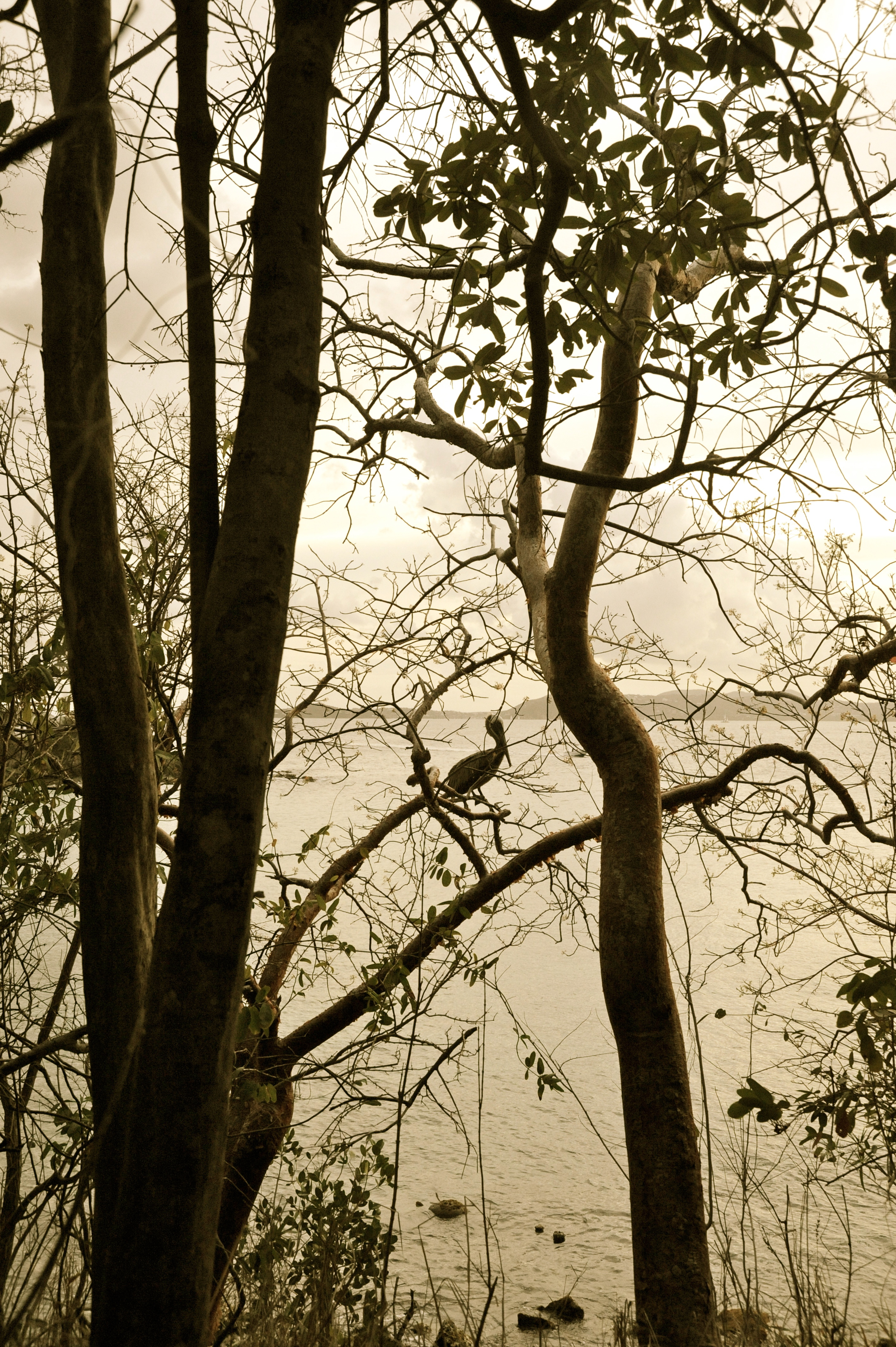

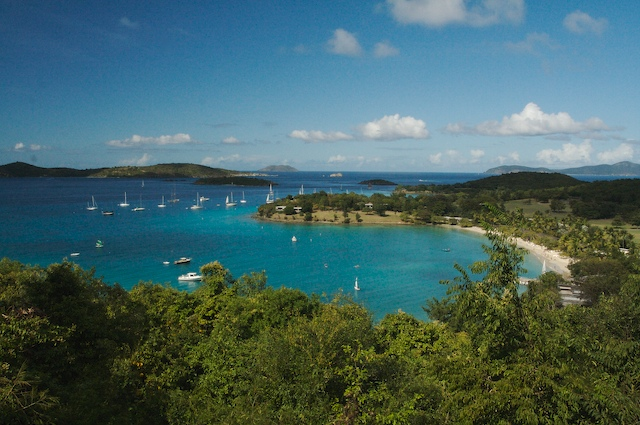
