= Jackson Hole Economic Symposium =

Annual conference of central bankers

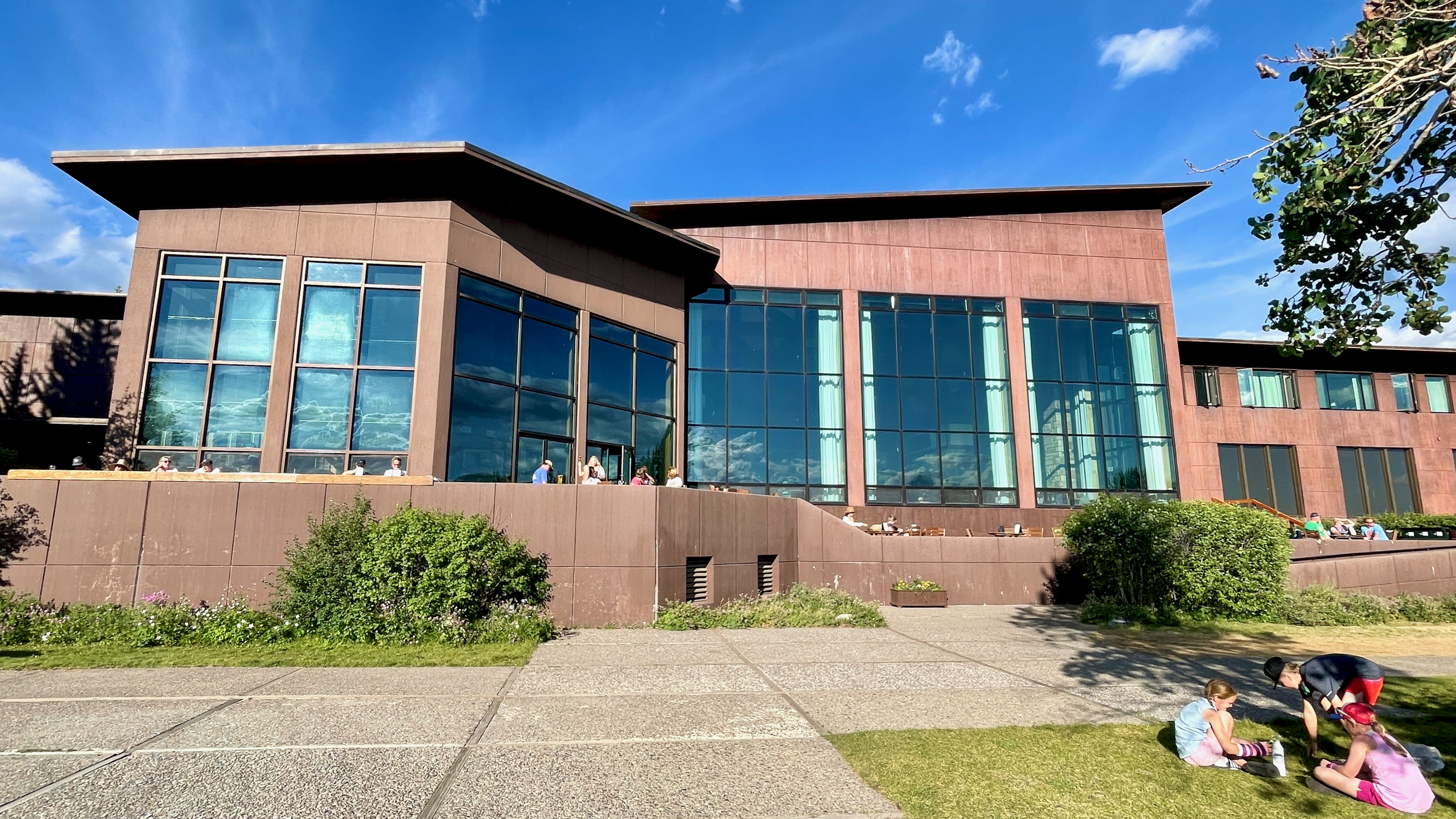
Jackson Lake Lodge

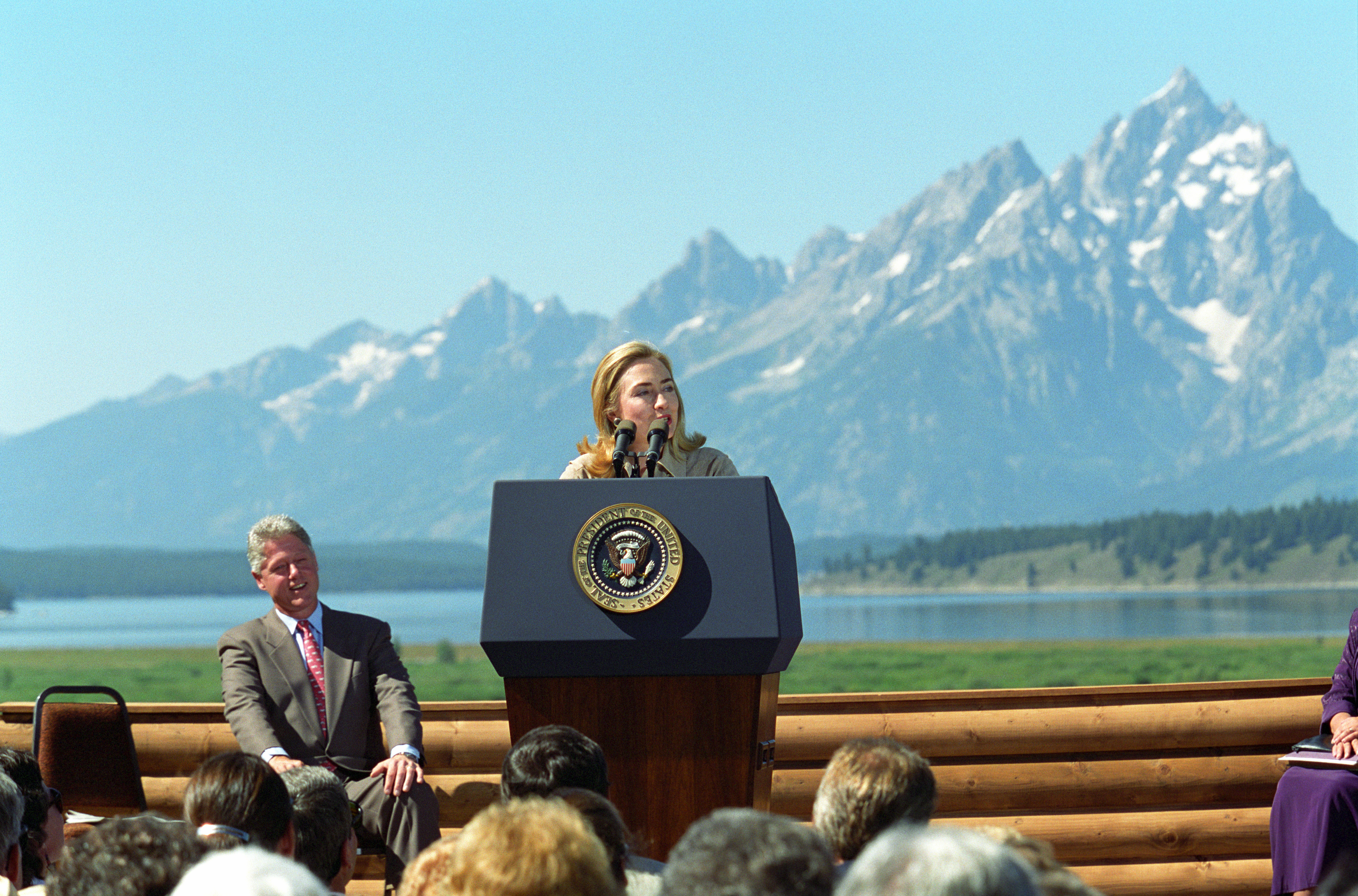
Hillary Rodham Clinton at Jackson Lake Lodge with Grand Teton mountain in background

The Federal Reserve's Jackson Hole Economic Symposium is a three-day annual international conference hosted by the Federal Reserve Bank of Kansas City at Jackson Hole, Wyoming in the United States. It is attended by central bank leaders, academics, journalists, financial industry leaders, and government officials from around the world to discuss long-term policy issues of "mutual concern". As of 2025, representatives from 70 countries have attended or participated in the symposium.

Participants discuss world events and financial trends, and the discussions at the symposium are watched for economic news—including potential insights on the likely direction of global interest rates. It has been described by The New York Times as "the world's most exclusive economic get-together".

The event is held at vacation destination Jackson Lake Lodge in Grand Teton National Park, in Wyoming's Teton County. during late August. It was held in a few different locations in the late 1970s, but Jackson Hole has been the location since 1981. The conference was placed in Jackson Hole partly because Paul Volcker, then the Federal Reserve chairman, was an avid angler who enjoyed fly fishing opportunities in the area. Among the regular attendees are top economists from the Federal Reserve Board, as well as other policymakers such as foreign central bank governors. Through 2025, more than 150 authors have presented papers on subjects including inflation, labor markets, and international trade.

== Notable meetings ==
The 1984 meeting focused on the causes of inflation. The 2016 meeting focused on the effects of central bank balance sheets on financial stability. The 2018 meeting focused on the effect of tech giants on the economy. At the 2020 meeting, Fed chairman Jerome Powell announced a new policy for raising interest rates that was not simply based on joblessness or inflation expectations.

During the COVID-19 pandemic the economic symposium was held virtually for 2020 and 2021. About 100-120 economists, central bankers, and journalists meet for the symposium.

The 2022 meeting was the first in-person meeting since 2019. Despite acknowledging the risk of recession, the majority of central bankers expressed their determination to increase interest rates for the purpose of curbing inflation. Bank of Japan governor Haruhiko Kuroda was exceptional in expressing his need to continue reducing interest rates.

The 2025 meeting took place August 21-23 and the theme was "Labor Markets in Transition: Demographics, Productivity, and Macroeconomic Policy." During a speech, Federal Reserve Chair Jerome Powell, acknowledged risks to the labor market were rising, which many market participants believed signaled a willingness to cut interest rates for the first time since December 2024.

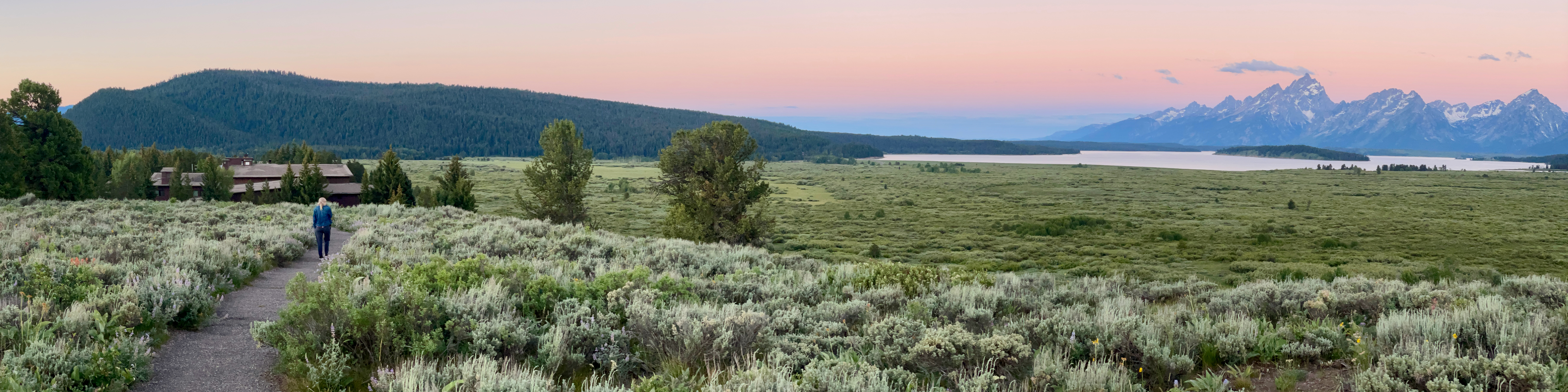
Jackson Lake Lodge at dawn from Lunch Tree Hill

== See also ==
- Federal funds rate
- Federal Reserve Banks
- Monetary sovereignty
