= Jackson Lake Dam =

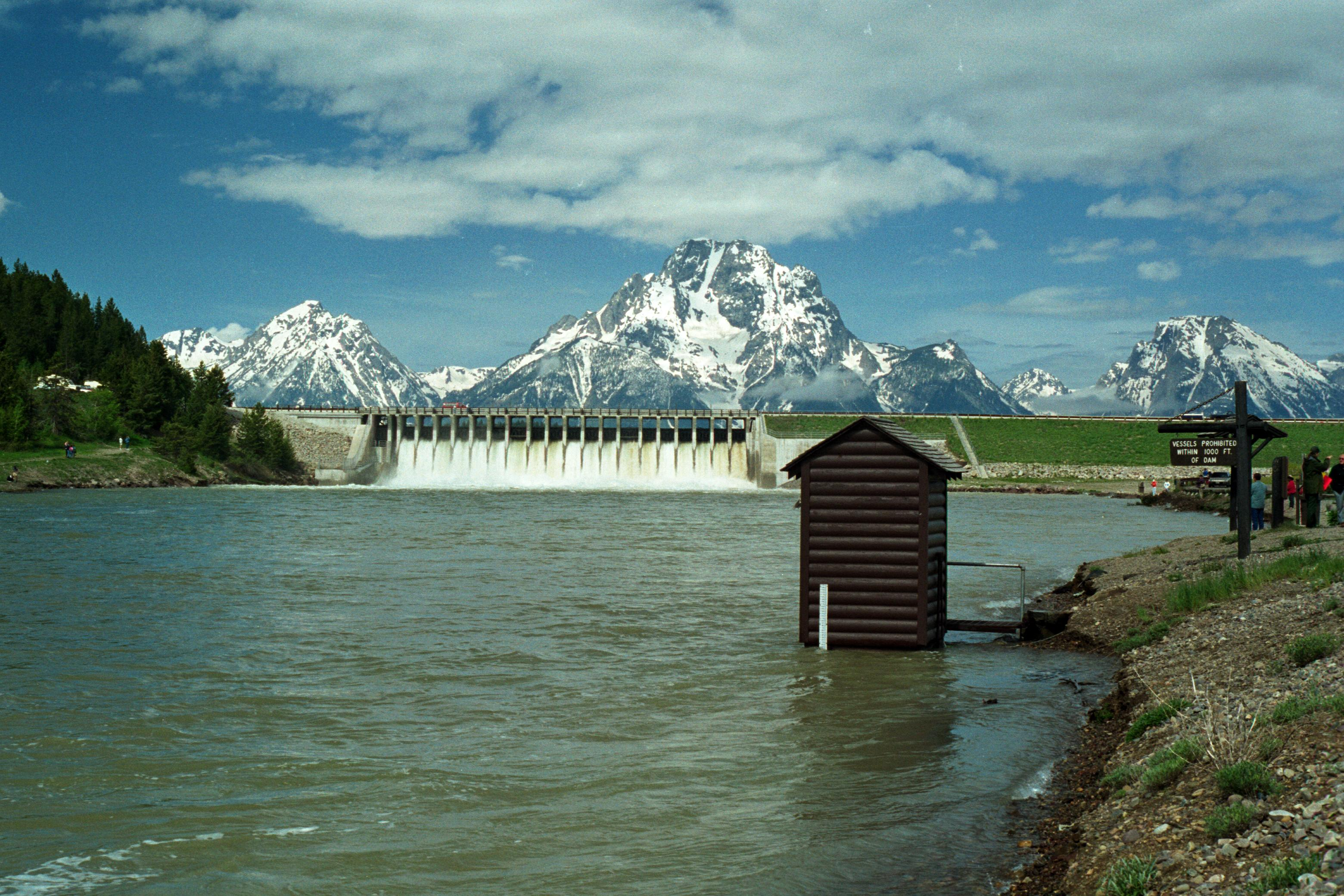
- Looking west in June 1997 from the north shore of the Snake River

- Location within Wyoming Location within the United States
- Interactive map of Jackson Lake Dam
- Location: Teton County, Wyoming, in Grand Teton National Park
- Coordinates: 43°51′27.53″N 110°35′22.54″W
- Construction began: 1911
- Opening date: 1916; 110 years ago
- Operator: U.S. Bureau of Reclamation

Dam and spillways
- Type of dam: Concrete gravity with earth embankment wings
- Impounds: Snake River
- Height: 65 ft (20 m)
- Length: 4,920 ft (1,500 m)
- Width (crest): 24 ft (7.3 m)
- Width (base): 72 ft (22 m)
- Spillway type: gated overflow
- Spillway capacity: 8690cfs at 6790 ft

Reservoir
- Creates: Jackson Lake
- Total capacity: 847,000 acre-feet (1.045 km^{3})
- Catchment area: 1,824 sq mi (4,720 km^{2})
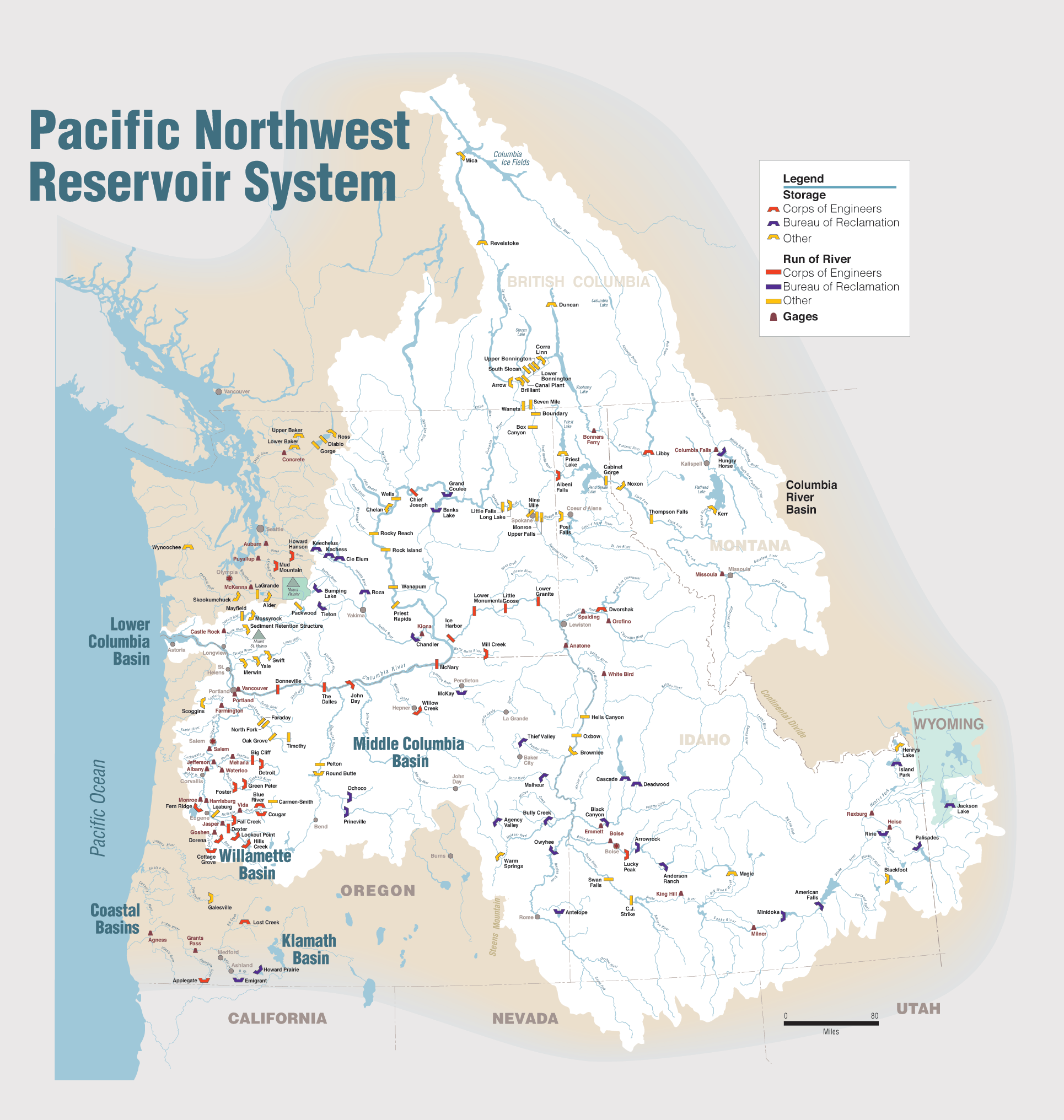
- Columbia River Basin dams

Jackson Lake Dam is a concrete and earth-fill dam in the western United States, at the outlet of Jackson Lake in northwestern Wyoming. The lake and dam are situated within Grand Teton National Park in Teton County. The Snake River emerges from the dam and flows about eight hundred miles (1,300 km) through Wyoming, Idaho, Oregon, and Washington to its mouth on the Columbia River in eastern Washington.

The chief purpose of the dam is to provide water storage for irrigation in the Snake River basin in the state of Idaho as part of the Minidoka Project. Jackson Lake is a natural lake, but its depth was increased by the dam to provide water storage.

== History ==
The first Jackson Lake Dam was a log-crib dam constructed in 1906–07 across the outlet of Jackson Lake, a natural lake. That dam raised the lake level by 22 feet (6.7 m), but the dam failed in 1910. A new concrete and earthen dam was constructed in stages between 1911 and 1916, raising the maximum lake level to thirty feet (9 m) above the lake's natural elevation, providing a storage capacity of 847,000 acre-feet (1.0 billion cubic metres). The new dam was designed by Frank A. Banks, who would later supervise the construction of Grand Coulee Dam.

The reservoir was created by damming the outlet of the natural glacial Jackson Lake, with the additional height creating a storage pool for the Minidoka Project, which provides irrigation water from the Snake River for farmlands in Idaho. Jackson Lake stores and releases water which is collected by Minidoka Dam and American Falls Dam more than one hundred miles (160 km) downstream for diversion to distribution canals. At the time of the dam's construction, Jackson Hole and the Teton Range were as yet unprotected from development. Grand Teton National Park was established in 1929, and excluded Jackson Lake.

The lake was incorporated into Jackson Hole National Monument when it was proclaimed by President Franklin D. Roosevelt under the Antiquities Act, and became a part of Grand Teton National Park in 1950 when the park was expanded to encompass the national monument lands. When the dam was built there was no attempt to clear the shores of the lake of standing timber, resulting in an unsightly band of dead trees when the waters rose. This vista, and the mudflats created by drawdown of lake waters, were cited in later years in successful arguments against reservoirs in Yellowstone National Park.

Construction personnel for the dam were housed at a temporary camp that dwarfed the nearby town of Moran. Supplies came in from the Grassy Lake Road north of the park, which runs west into Idaho to meet the nearest railhead at Ashton, Idaho.

== Reinforcement ==
The U.S. Bureau of Reclamation conducted studies on dams in 1976 and determined that Jackson Lake Dam was susceptible to failure in case of an earthquake of magnitude 5.5 or greater. Following the Borah Peak earthquake of 1983 in Idaho, the dam was upgraded during 1986–1989, and the Bureau of Reclamation believed it could withstand the "maximum credible earthquake," a magnitude 7.5 quake on the Teton fault. Since then various studies have cast doubt on this belief.

== Dam facts and figures ==
The dam is owned and operated by the U.S. Bureau of Reclamation, which maintains the water level above the lake's natural elevation for downstream irrigation.

- Type: Concrete gravity dam with earthen embankment wings
- Drainage area: 1,824 square miles (4,724 km^{2})
- Lake elevation:
  - Normal full pool: 6,760 feet (2,060 m)
  - Maximum pool: 6,769 feet (2,063 m)
  - Minimum pool: 6,730 feet (2,050 m)
  - Maximum water surface: 6,770.3 feet (2,063.6 m)
- Usable storage (6730–6760 ft): 847,000 acre⋅ft (1.0 billion m^{3})
- Crest elevation: 6,777 feet (2,066 m)
- Crest length: 4,920 feet (1,500 m)
- Crest width: 24 feet (7.3 m)
- Base width: 72 feet (22 m)
- Structural height: 65 feet (20 m)
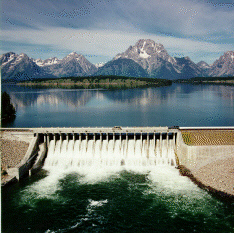
Jackson Lake Dam. View is to the west.

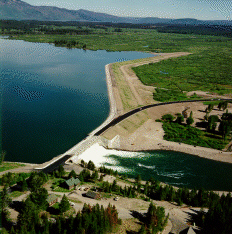
Jackson Lake Dam. View is to the northwest.

== See also ==
- List of dams in the Columbia River watershed
