= Jackson Lake Lodge =

- U.S. National Register of Historic Places
- U.S. National Historic Landmark District
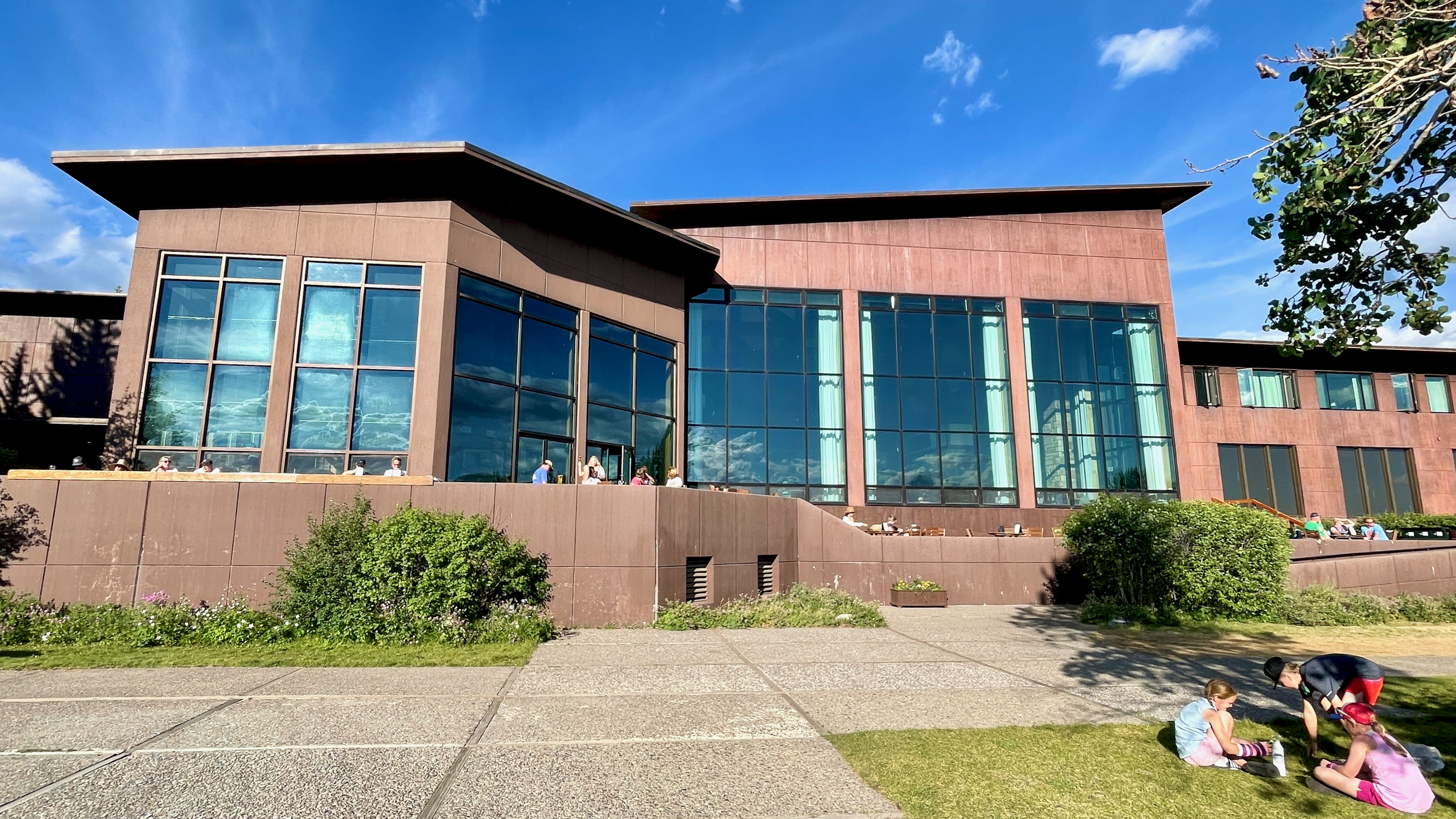
- Jackson Lake Lodge in 2021

- Location within Wyoming Location within the United States
- Location: Moran, Grand Teton National Park, Wyoming, USA 83013
- Coordinates: 43°52′39″N 110°34′36″W
- Area: 144 acres (58 ha)
- Built: 1955
- MPS: Grand Teton National Park MPS
- NRHP reference No.: 03001039
- Added to NRHP: July 31, 2003

Jackson Lake Lodge is located near Moran in Grand Teton National Park, in the U.S. state of Wyoming. The lodge has 385 rooms, a restaurant, conference rooms, and offers numerous recreational opportunities. The lodge is owned by the National Park Service, and operated under contract by the Grand Teton Lodge Company. The Grand Teton Lodge Company also manages the Jenny Lake Lodge, as well as cabins, restaurants and other services at Colter Bay Village. The lodge is located east of Jackson Lake adjacent to prime moose habitat below the Jackson Lake Dam.

== History ==
In 1950, John D. Rockefeller Jr. called on architect Gilbert Stanley Underwood to design the Jackson Lake Lodge. This building marked the transition in the National Park System from rustic to modern design. Underwood revolutionized park architecture by combining modern materials with rustic accents, such as the wood grain-textured concrete seen on this building. Rockefeller developed the lodge to help make parks accessible to all Americans. Although the lodge was originally criticized for being too modern, it harmonizes with the natural surroundings with a low profile receding amid the aspen and pine trees. Landscapers planted native species mimicking the local environment.

Designed by architect Gilbert Stanley Underwood and completed in 1955, the lodge is an example of the National Park Service's interpretation of the International Style which was commonly seen in structures built on U.S. Government parklands in the mid-20th century. The lodge combines elements of the more rustic structures of the earlier decades of the 20th century with a more modern design elements that became standard for the next couple of decades.

The Federal Reserve holds an annual Jackson Hole Economic Symposium at the lodge in late summer, hosted by the Federal Reserve Bank of Kansas City and attended by prominent economic policymakers from around the world.

=== Old Jackson Lake Lodge ===
The resort complex was built over the site of the Amoretti Hotel and Camp Company's Jackson Lake Lodge, built by Eugene Amoretti of Lander, Wyoming from 1922. Amoretti's lodge, boasting the first hot and cold running water in the valley, featured guest cabins and tent cabins. It was purchased by the Snake River Land Company in 1930 and continued to operate until 1953, when its 23 cabins were demolished in favor of the new resort.

== Historic district ==
Jackson Lake Lodge is the main property of a 144-acre (58 ha) National Historic Landmark District that has 38 contributing buildings and one contributing site. The district was added to the National Register of Historic Places on July 31, 2003 for its significance in architecture, entertainment/recreation, and conservation.

== Gallery ==
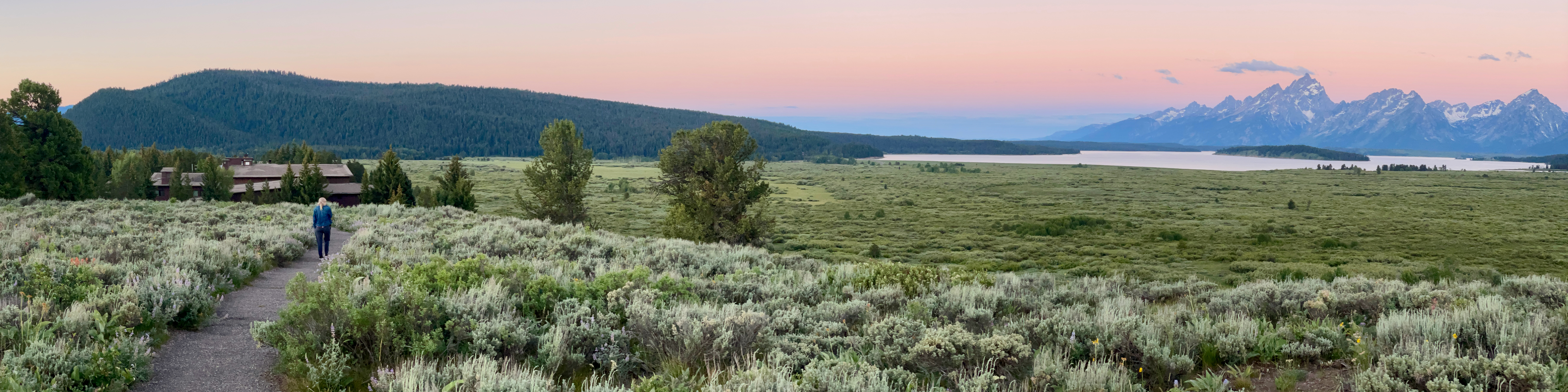
Jackson Lake Lodge at dawn. View of Willow Flats, Jackson Lake, and the Teton Range

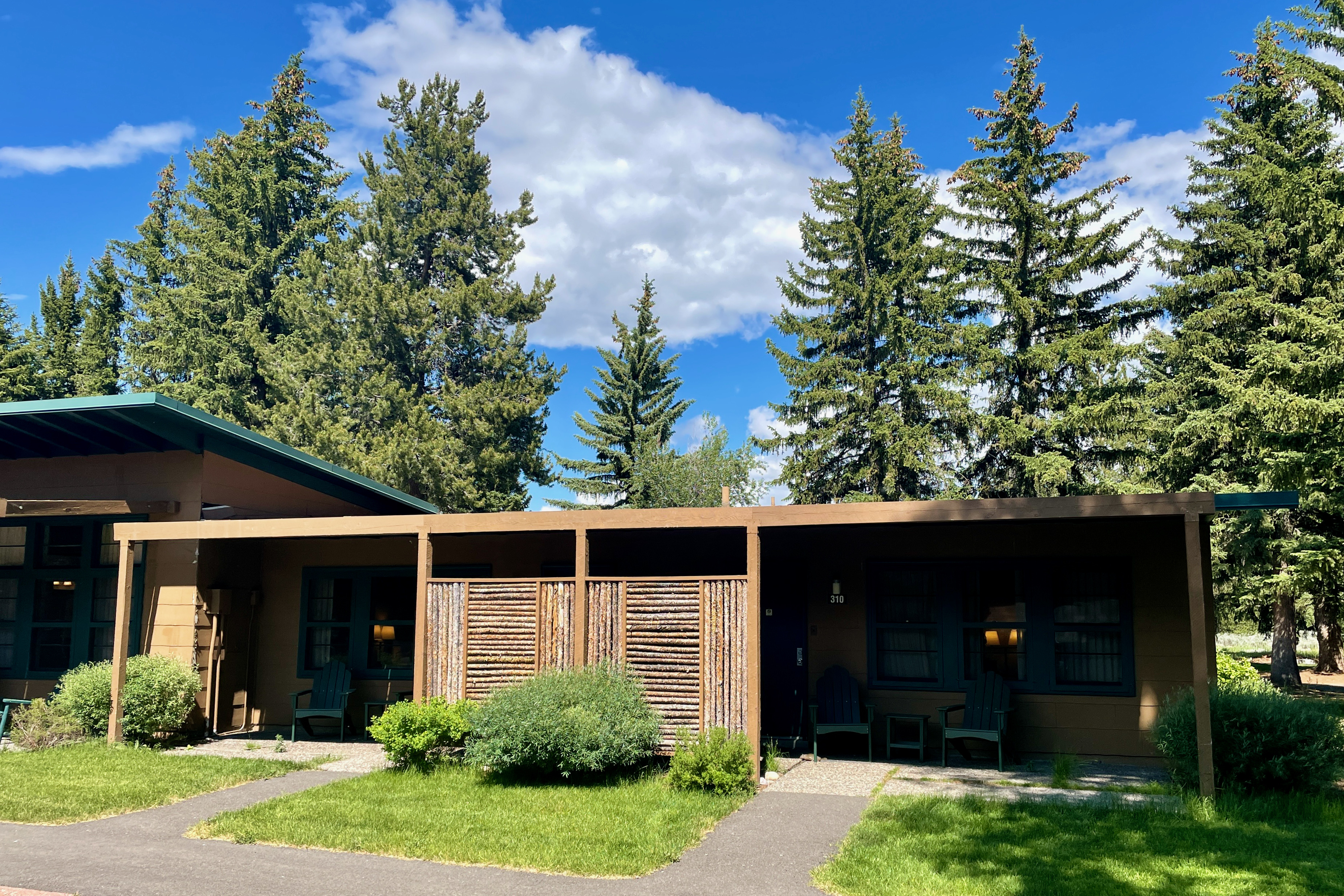
Cottages and landscaped trees

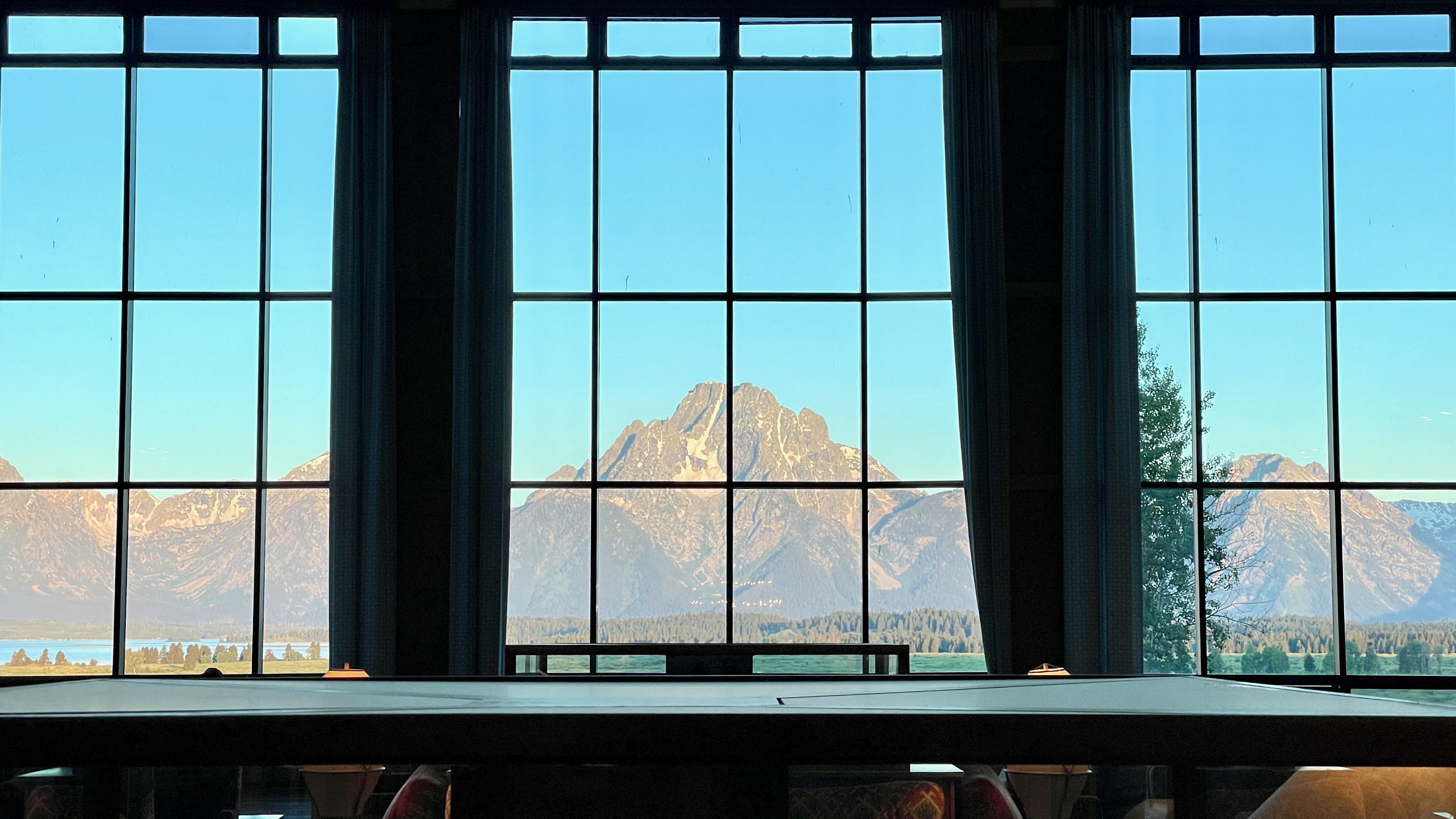
Mount Moran view from the lobby

== See also ==
- National Register of Historic Places listings in Teton County, Wyoming
- List of National Historic Landmarks in Wyoming
- Historical buildings and structures of Grand Teton National Park
