= Jenny Lake Lodge =

Coordinates: 43°46′57″N 110°43′24″W

Jenny Lake Lodge is a luxury resort concession in Grand Teton National Park. Located close to the base of the Teton Range at Jenny Lake, the resort as operated since the 1920s, when Tony Grace established the Danny Ranch, a dude ranch, on the site, with two rental cabins. The ranch was purchased by the Snake River Land Company, which made improvements starting around 1933, under the auspices of its operating company, the Teton Investment Company. The ranch's lodge burned in 1935, but a new lodge was built, accompanied by enough cabins to accommodate 65 guests.

Jenny Lake Lodge is operated by the Grand Teton Lodge Company, which also operates Jackson Lake Lodge and Colter Bay Village in the park.
