= Jackson Lake (Wyoming) =

Lake in the American state of Wyoming

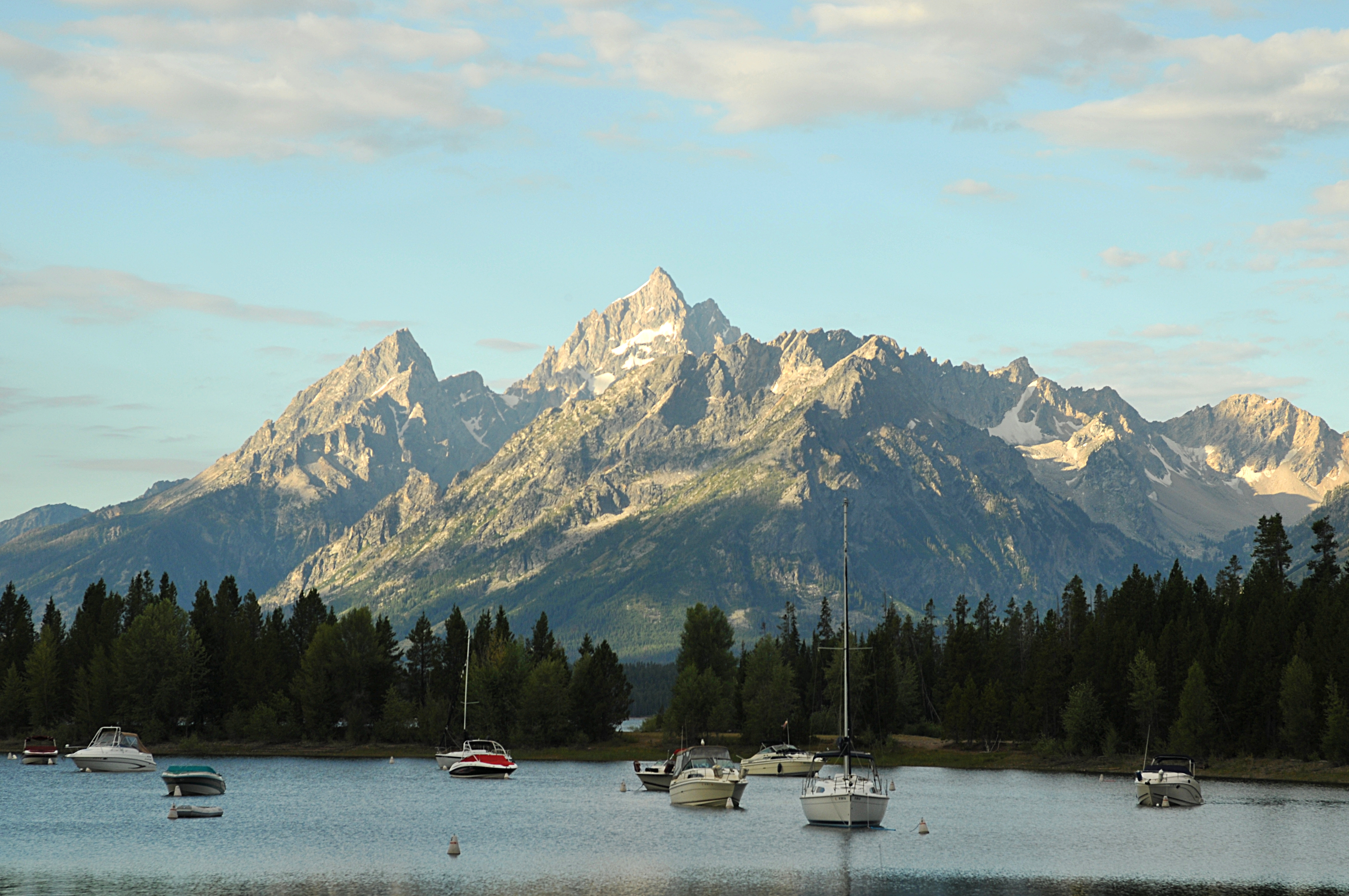
- Jackson Lake from Colter Bay

- Location within Wyoming Location within the United States
- Location: Grand Teton National Park, Teton County, Wyoming, US
- Coordinates: 43°54′02″N 110°40′26″W
- Type: Moraine-dammed lake and dam
- Primary inflows: Snake River
- Primary outflows: Snake River
- Basin countries: United States
- Max. length: 15 mi (24 km)
- Max. width: 7 mi (11 km)
- Surface area: 25,540 acres (10,340 ha)
- Max. depth: 438 ft (134 m)
- Surface elevation: 6,772 ft (2,064 m)
- Islands: Over 15 including Elk Island, Donoho Point

Jackson Lake is in Grand Teton National Park in northwestern Wyoming. This natural lake was enlarged by the construction of the Jackson Lake Dam originally built in 1911, enlarged in 1916 and rebuilt by 1989. As part of the Minidoka Project the top 33 ft (10 m) of the lake is used by farmers in Idaho for irrigation purposes under water rights legislation enacted prior to the establishment of Grand Teton National Park. The lake is the remnant of large glacial gouging from the neighboring Teton Range to the west and the Yellowstone Plateau to the north. The lake is primarily fed by the Snake River, which flows in from the north, and empties at Jackson Lake Dam. Jackson Lake is one of the largest high-altitude lakes in the United States, at an elevation of 6,772 ft (2,064 m) above sea level. The lake is up to 15 mi (24 km) long, 7 mi (11 km) wide, and 438 ft (134 m) deep. The water of the lake averages below 60 °F (16 °C), even during the summer.

Numerous species of fish inhabit the lake including nonnative brown and lake trout and the native Snake River fine-spotted cutthroat trout and mountain whitefish.

There are over 15 islands in the lake, including the largest, Elk Island, and Donoho Point.

John D. Rockefeller, Jr. Memorial Parkway is located near the northern end of Jackson Lake and extends to the south entrance of Yellowstone National Park. This roadway combines with the roads in Grand Teton National Park that follow the eastern side of the lake, and provides access for boating and fishing. There are several marinas and lodges along the eastern shore such as Leeks marina, Colter Bay Village, Jackson Lake Lodge and Signal Mountain Lodge. All of these except Jackson Lake Lodge have boat access points and ramps. The western shore of Jackson Lake is primitive, with only hiking trails and a handful of primitive campground spots.

== See also ==
- List of largest reservoirs of Wyoming
- Colter Bay Lakeshore Trail (hiking trail, part of which runs along the shore of Jackson Lake)
