= Geology of the Ellsworth Mountains =

Geology in Antarctica

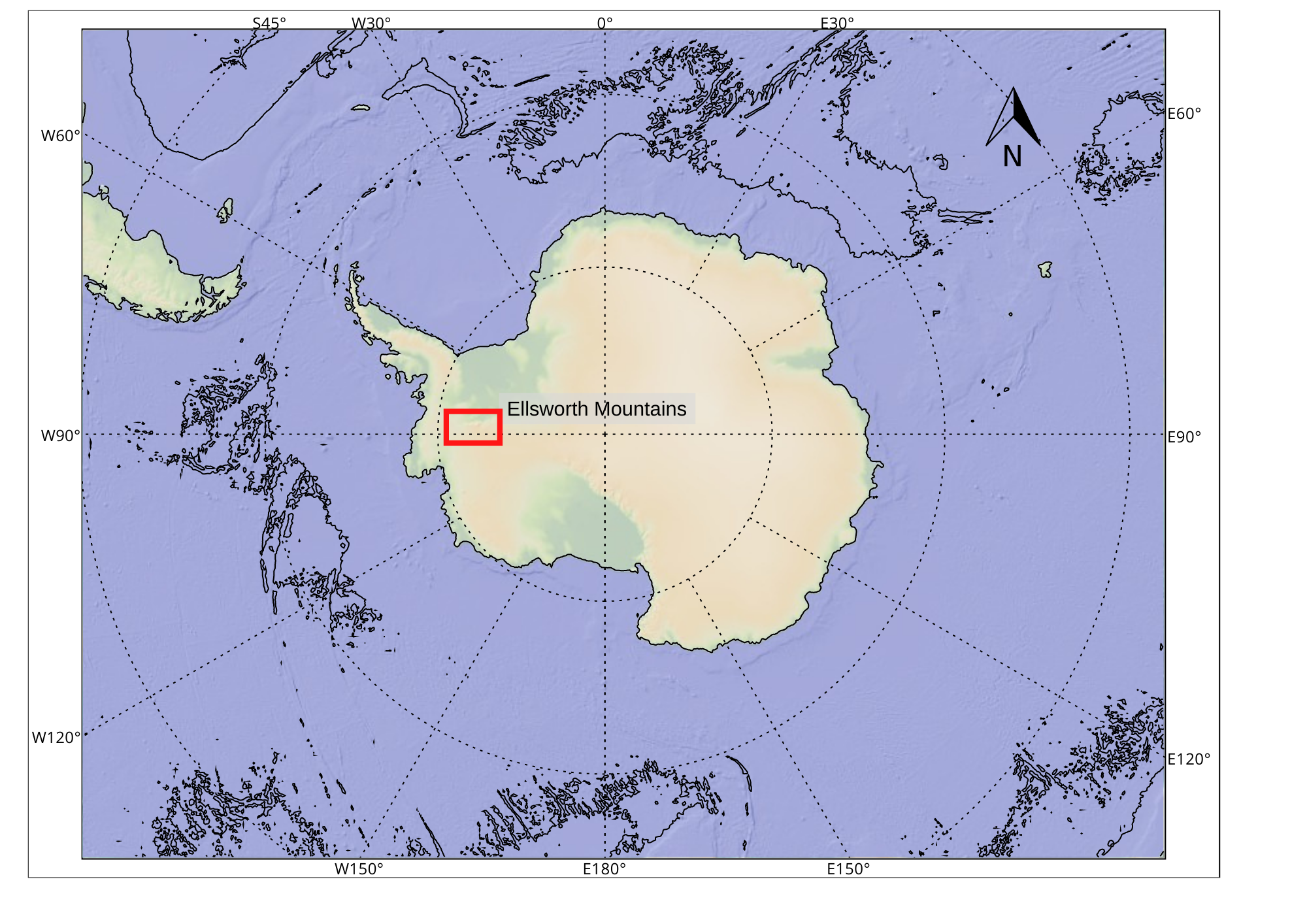
Location Map of the Ellsworth Mountains

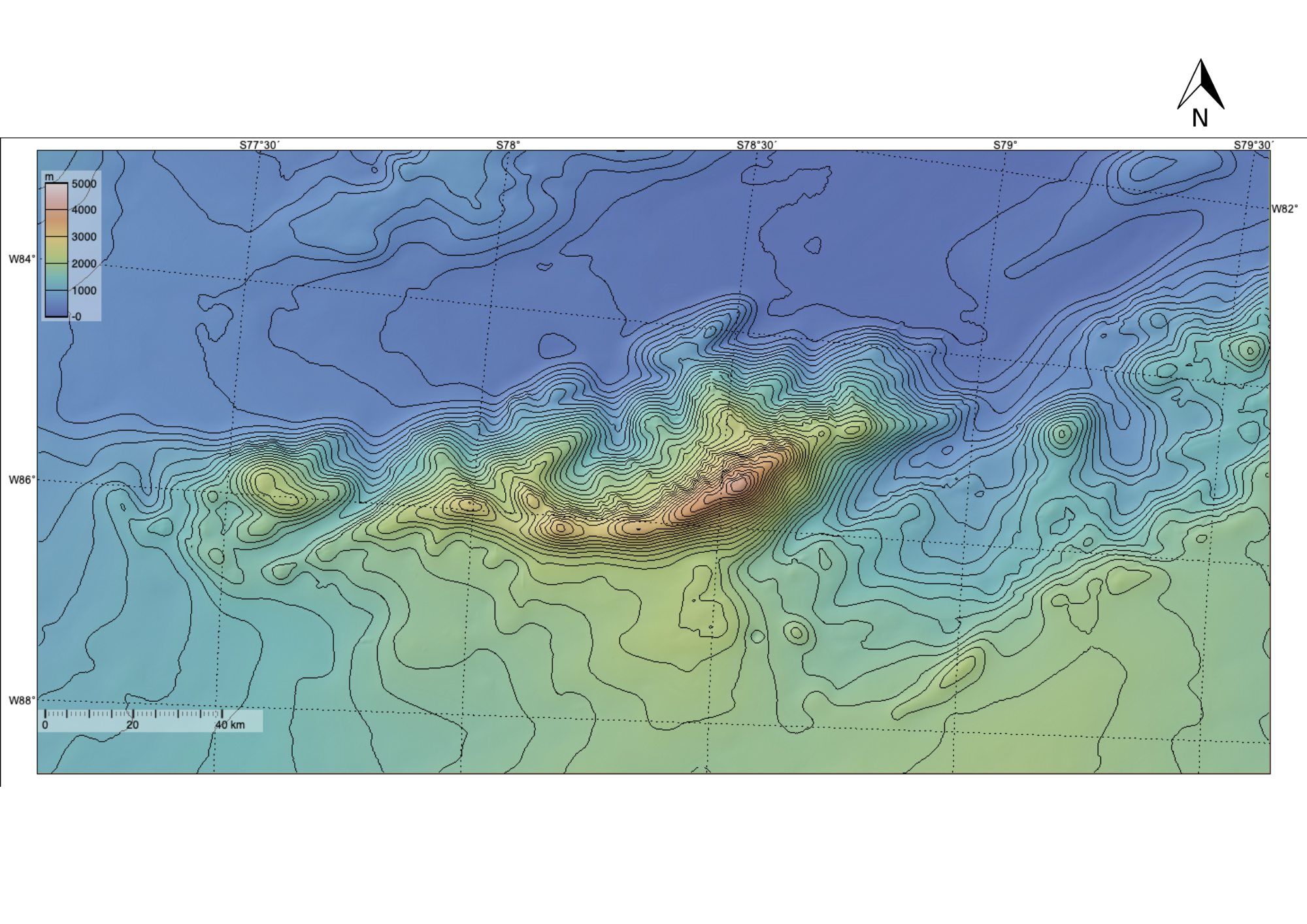
Topographic Map of Ellsworth Mountains with an interval of 100 metres (330 ft)

The geology of the Ellsworth Mountains, Antarctica, is a rock record of continuous deposition that occurred from the Cambrian to the Permian periods, with basic igneous volcanism and uplift occurring during the Middle to Late Cambrian epochs, deformation occurring in the Late Permian period or early Mesozoic era, and glacier formation occurring in the Cretaceous period and Cenozoic era. The Ellsworth Mountains are located within West Antarctica at 79°S, 85°W. In general, it is made up of mostly rugged and angular peaks such as the Vinson Massif (16,050 feet or 4,890 metres), the highest mountain in Antarctica.

The early Cambrian, when carbonate deposits were deposited in shallow marine conditions, is when the geologic history record across the Ellsworth Mountains began. Up to the Permian period, subsidence and deposition process persisted. Volcanism was scarce in the early history of the Ellsworth Mountains. The majority of the strata are thought to have formed in marine environments at shallow to moderate depths. After sedimentary deposition occurred during the Permian time, all strata underwent orogeny, which lead to strong folding and localised metamorphism. It is hypothesised that there are two stages of the uplift separated by a steady period of erosional gradation as the deformed rocks have raised by at least 6,000 metres (20,000 ft). In the Ellsworth Mountains, alpine glaciation may have first appeared during the Mesozoic era. The local glacial processes in the Ellsworth Mountains are largely responsible for the contemporary landscapes that we observe today. The mountains were covered by the continental ice sheet throughout the middle to late Cenozoic period.

== Stratigraphic geological history ==
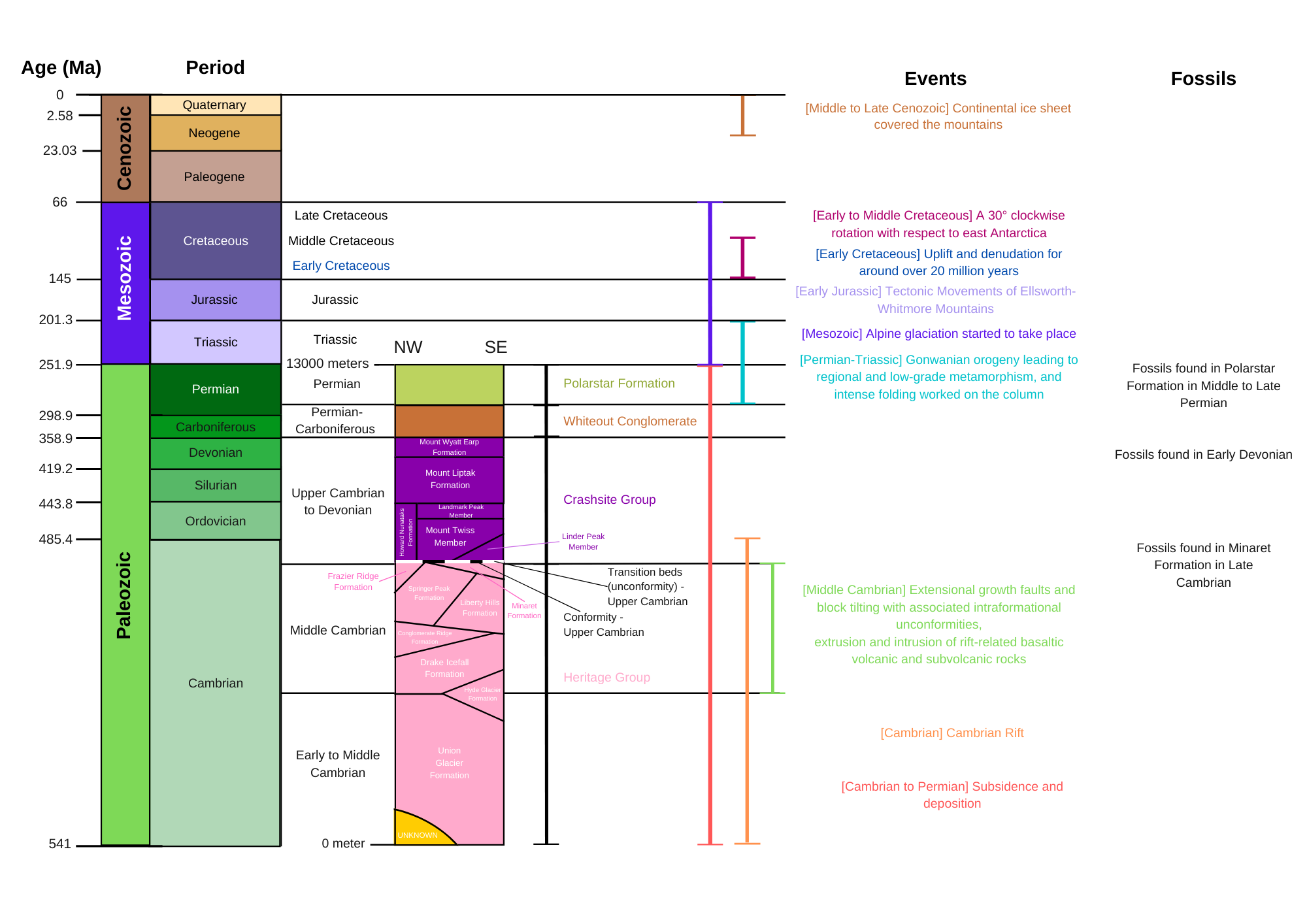
Geological Stratigraphy of the Ellsworth Mountains

The Ellsworth Mountains display a 13-kilometre (8 mi) thick geologic sequence of Paleozoic sedimentary and volcanic rocks. The Lower to Upper Cambrian Heritage Group is part of the lower Paleozoic series old rock strata. The uppermost Cambrian to Devonian Crashsite Group makes up the middle portion of the geologic sequence, while the Permian-Carboniferous Whiteout Conglomerate and Permian Polarstar Formation make up the remaining upper portion.

The whole stratigraphic succession has been impacted by the two post-Permian episodes of deformation, Late Permian Deformation and Permian-Triassic Deformation (which will be covered in the Structural Geology portion). During the Permian-Triassic Gondwanian deformation event, the major dextral transpressive Permian-Triassic Deformation structure locally develops and superimposes the Late Permian Deformation structures. As a result, the rocks of the Ellsworth Mountains range from the Permian Polarstar Formation to lower strata of the Cambrian Heritage Group, with a positive correlation between depth and metamorphic grade.

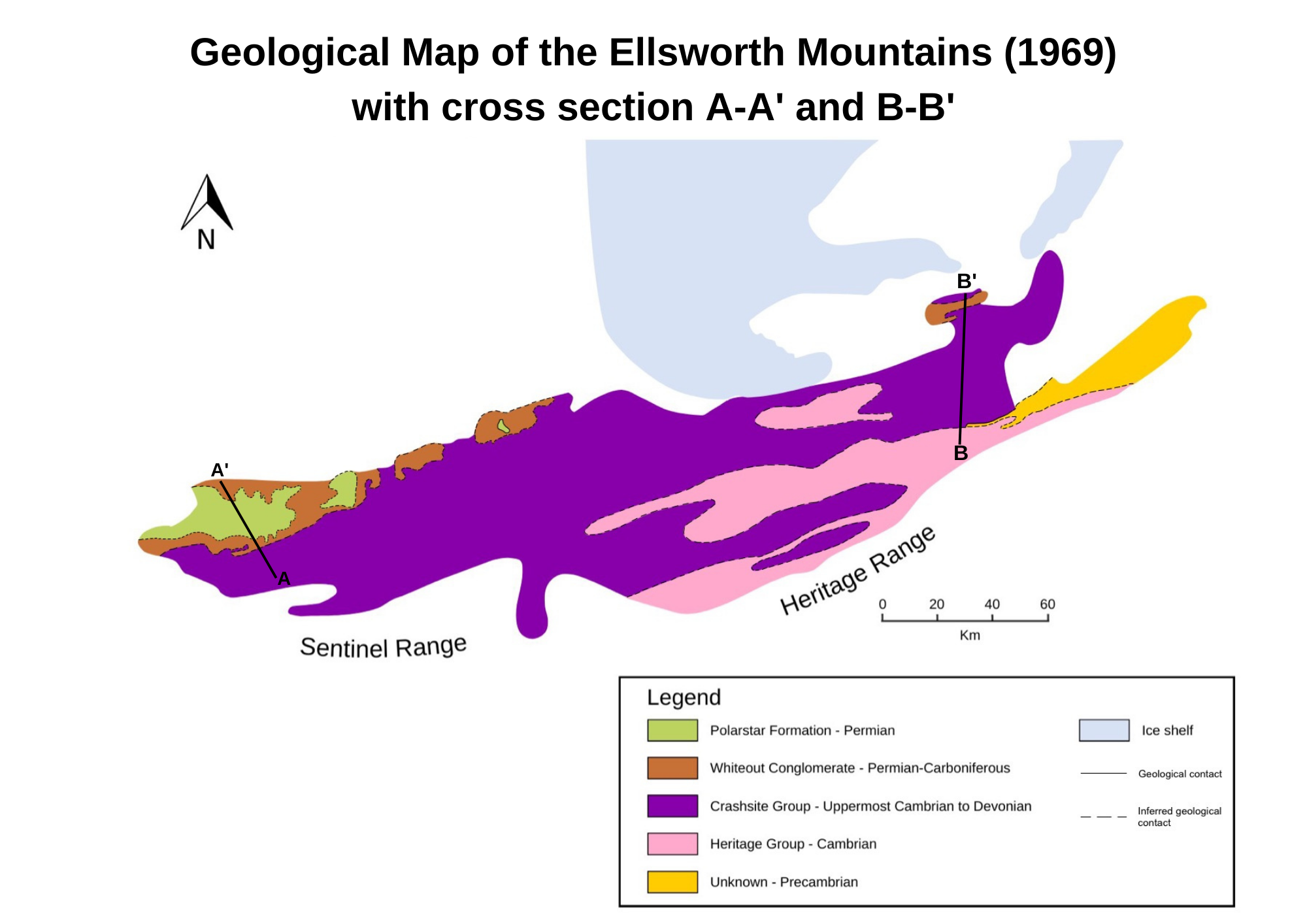
Geological map of the Ellsworth Mountains (1969)

=== Heritage Group ===
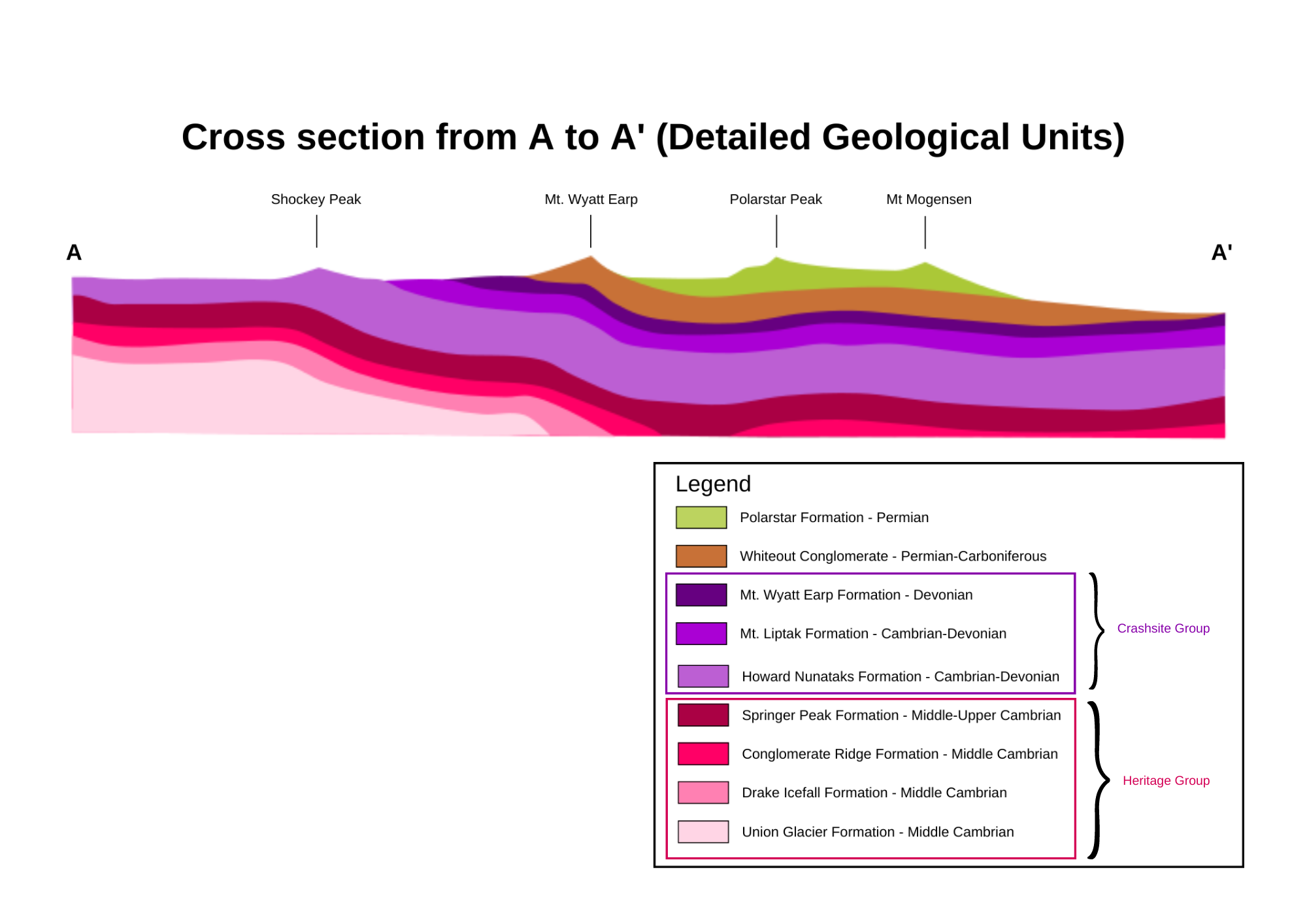
Cross section from A to A' (Detailed Geological Units)

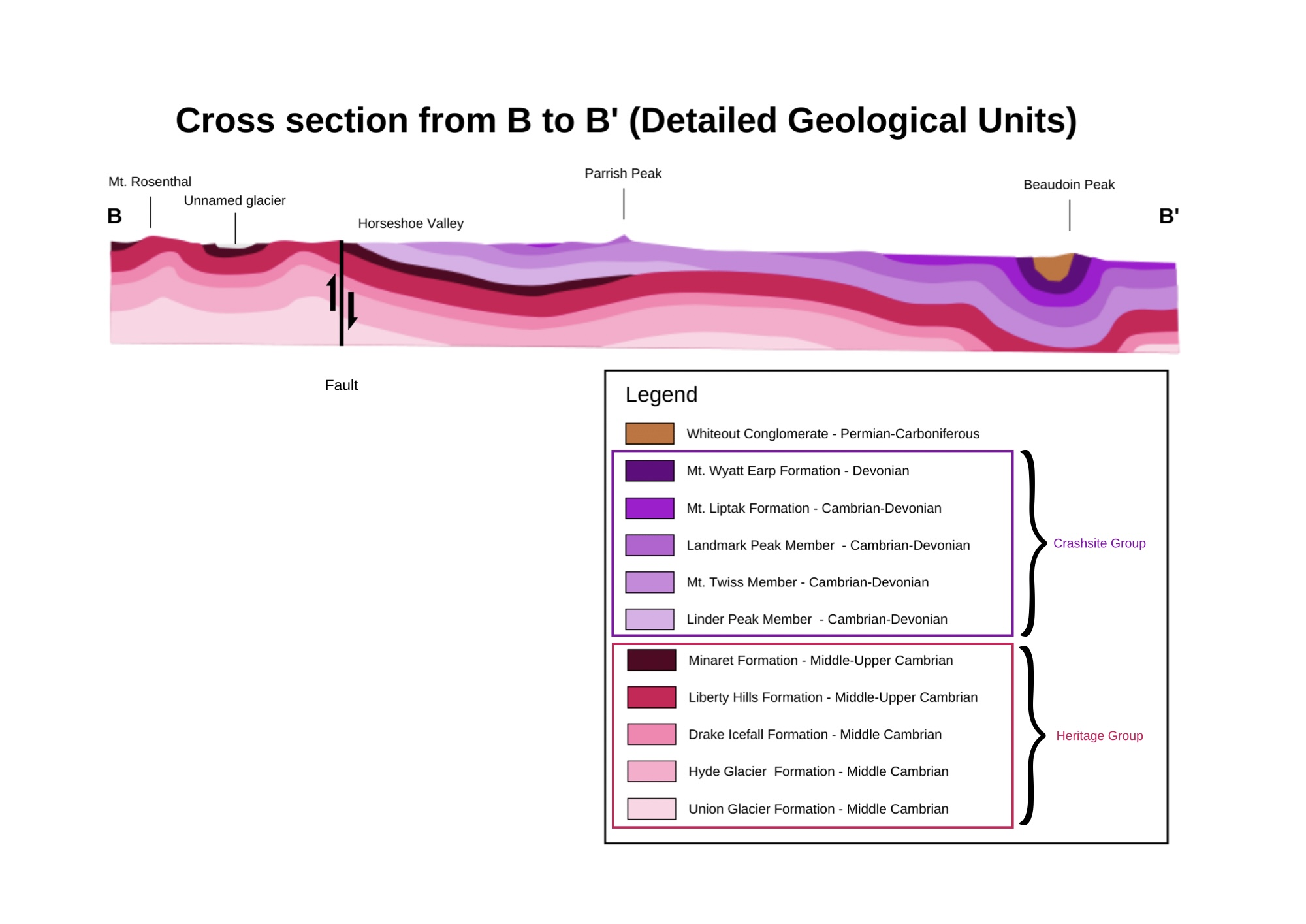
Cross section from B to B' (Detailed Geological Units)

Union Glacier Formation, Hyde Glacier Formation, Drake Ice Fall Formation at southern Soholt Peaks, Conglomerate Ridge Formation, Library Hills Formation, Springer Peak Formation, Frazier Ridge Formation, and Minaret Formation are the eight clastic sedimentary and volcanic rock formations that make up the Heritage Group. The Heritage Group as a whole is around 7,500 metres (24,600 ft) thick. The pumpellyite-actinolite grade and the lower greenschist facies make up the majority of the bottom units of the Cambrian Heritage Group. It is discovered to be a sequence of syn-rifts. The Heritage Group's conglomerate units' clast compositions indicate that an Early Cambrian carbonate platform and widespread quartzite exposures were present in the rift succession's source region.

==== Union Glacier Formation ====
The Union Glacier Formation is made up of volcaniclastic rocks that extend for around 3000 metres. Terrestrial lahar and ash-flow tuff deposits served as the raw ingredients for the formation of these rocks. In the late Early Cambrian to early Middle Cambrian era, it was developed. A continental rift, where the lithosphere was thinned, served as the tectonic backdrop for this formation during this time.

==== Hyde Glacier Formation ====
The heterolithic sequence bedding of the Hyde Glacier Formation, which ranges from sand to mud, demonstrates the depositional environment from fluvial to shallow-marine delta. This formation may be the result of tectonic movement or lateral discontinuity.

==== Drake Icefall Formation at southern Soholt Peaks ====
The lower Middle Cambrian black shales and interlayered limestone carbonates of the Drake Icefall Formation are found in southern Soholt Peaks. The rocks in this formation provide an evidence that sedimentation occurred in a shallow-marine and euxinic environment where with anoxic and sulfidic conditions. The quantity of free hydrogen sulphide increased since there was no oxygen present. A thin limestone that has undergone recrystallization and has a thickness of less than five metres makes up the formation's topmost depositional unit. The limestone is comparable to that which makes up the lowermost portion of the Drake Icefall Formation's immediate neighbour, the Conglomerate Ridge Formation.

==== Conglomerate Ridge Formation ====
A 450-meter-long layer of polymict- and clast-supported conglomerate (also known as breccia) with beds of fine- to coarse-grained quartzite makes up the Conglomerate Ridge Formation. The conglomerate demonstrates the transition of the formation environment from river to shallow-marine. Along a reversal fault that runs parallel to the thin recrystallized limestone that makes up the top depositional unit of the Drake Icefall Formation, the Conglomerate Ridge Formation overlies the Drake Icefall Formation.

==== Liberty Hills Formation ====
There have been no fossils discovered in the 1000-meter-thick Liberty Hills Formation. Based on the presence of early Cambrian (525 ± 2 Ma) granite clasts, also known as granite cobbles, the formation is determined to be of Middle Cambrian age. The Minaret Formation is atop it. Conglomerates, quartzites, and argillites make up the majority of this sequence of coarse-grained siliciclastic rocks.

==== Springer Peak Formation ====
The Springer Peak Formation is around 1000 metres thick. This deposit has a trilobite fauna, which indicates that it dates from the Middle Cambrian to the basal Upper Cambrian.

==== Frazier Ridge Formation ====
There have been no fossil discoveries in the Frazier Ridge Formation, which has a thickness of at least 500 metres. The dominant material in this formation is fine- to medium-grained green quartzite, which also occasionally contains layers of green argillite and black shale.

==== Minaret Formation ====
In the Upper Cambrian era, the Minaret Formation was created. It is a limestone unit that is laterally interrupted. It is discovered that this formation's thickness greatly increases in the direction of the Ellsworth Mountains in the southeast. This indicates a transition from shallow-water, low-energy carbonate deposits in the south to deeper, high-energy carbonate platform deposits in the north. Along the top border of the Minaret Formation, karst features are visible that were created by the breakdown of soluble elements in the rocks.

=== Type of contacts - Transitional beds ===
All places have conformable transitional beds of 20–60 metres, with the exception of Pojeta Peak, Soholt Peak, and Enterprise Hills. The transitional deposits are a narrow sequence of interbedded sandstone and siltstone from the Upper Cambrian period called argillite. It includes material from the inner to outer shelf and from shallow to deep environments. After the Minaret Formation emerged, a dramatic rise in the relative sea level caused it to develop.

Between the Springer Peak Formation and the Mount Twiss Member, which is a part of the Crashsite Group, there is an angular unconformity in the Pojeta Peak. Pojeta Peak's localised angular unconformity may have developed as a result of block tilting in regions of intrabasinal uplift. There are concordant erosional unconformities between the Minaret Formation and the base Crashsite Group at the Soholt Peaks and Mount Dolence.

Unconformities between the Heritage Group and the Crashsite Group are discovered on a local scale, but they are viewed as correlative conformity because of geographically extensive observations of this important border on a regional scale.

=== The Uppermost Cambrian to Devonian Crashsite Group ===
The Crashsite Group has six distinct rock types with a combined thickness of 3000 metres. It includes the Howard Nunataks Formation, the Mount Wyatt Earp Formation, the Linder Peak Member, the Mount Twiss Member, the Landmark Peak Member, and the Mount Liptak Formation. The transitional beds are primarily covered by quartzite.

=== The upper part of the 13-km thick stratigraphic succession ===
The Permian-Carboniferous Whiteout Conglomerate and the Permian Polarstar Formation make up the upper part of the 13-km thick geologic series of rock strata.

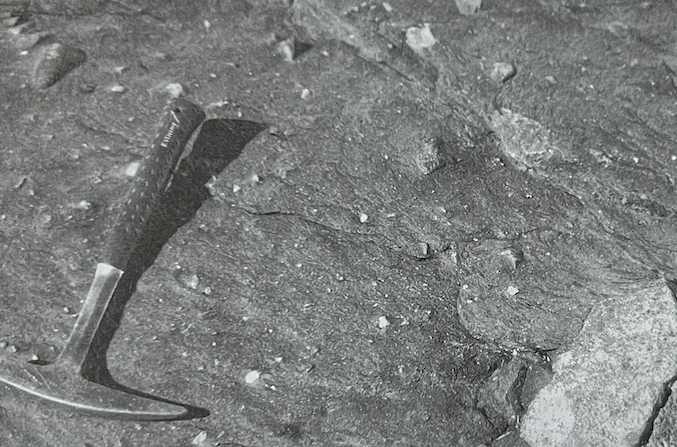
Whiteout Conglomerate's massive diamictite is found on Mount Ojakangas in the northern Sentinel Range.

==== Permian-Carboniferous Whiteout Conglomerate ====
The Permian-Carboniferous Whiteout Conglomerate is an Upper Carboniferous-Lower Permian glacial diamicite.

==== Polarstar Formation ====
The deep Cambrian to Permian sequence of the Ellsworth Mountains is topped by the argillite and sandstone Polarstar Formation, which is 1 km thick. The lowest part of the Polarstar Formation is dominated by argillite, a fine-grained sedimentary rock, while the middle part of the formation is composed of cycles of argillite and sandstone that coarsen upward. Fining-upward cycles of cross-bedded, channel-form, medium-grained, and fine-grained sandstone are seen in the upper Polarstar Formation.

== Paleontology history ==
The Heritage Range in the southern Ellsworth Mountains is home to several fossil sites from various geological eras, including the Late Cambrian and Late Permian. Based on the correlation of the fossils, it appears that the Ohio Range of the Horlick Mountains is where the fossils are most constant. This is also consistent with the idea that the Pensacola Mountains of the Transantarctic Mountains previously bordered the Ellsworth Mountains.

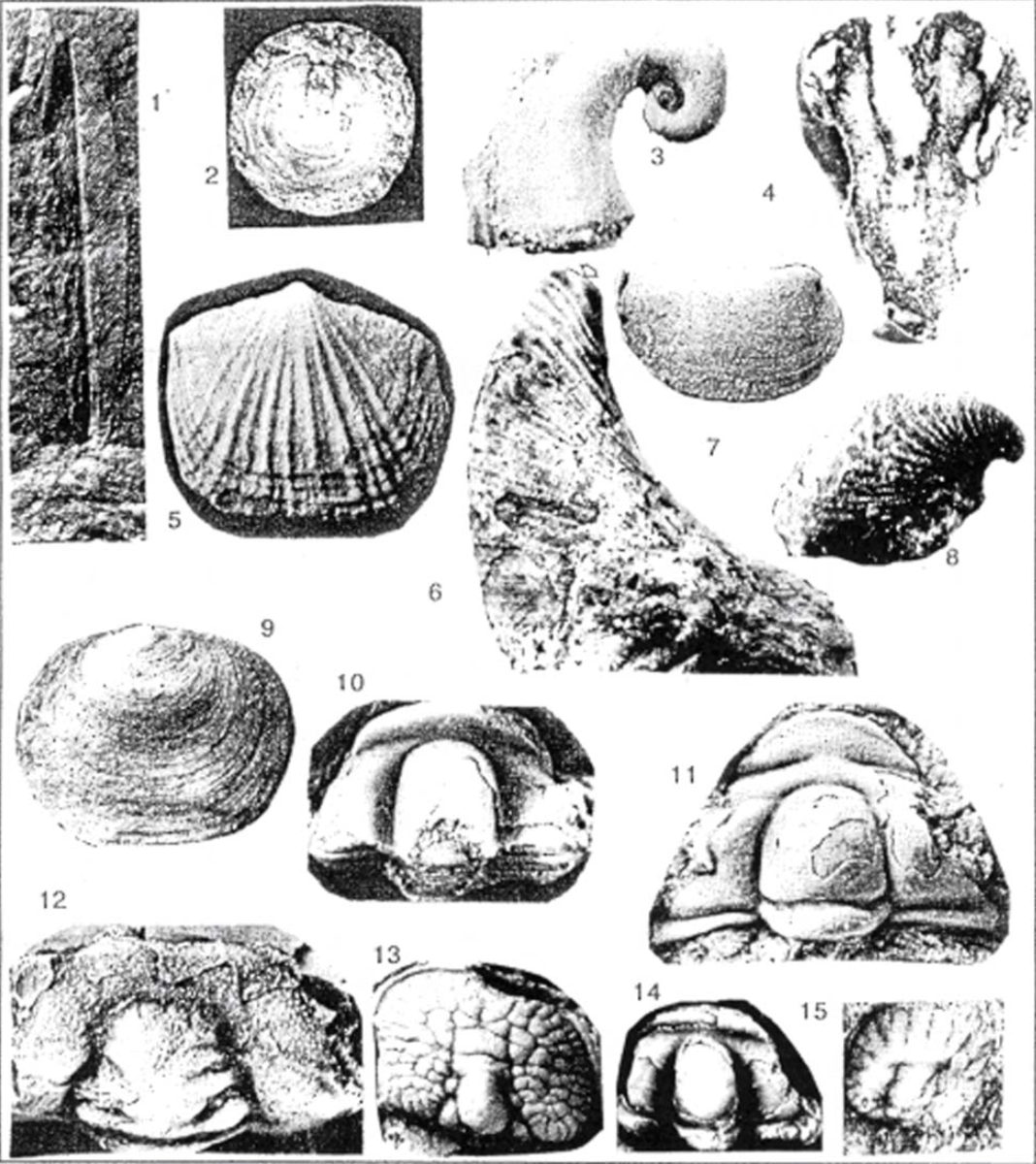
Representative Fossils from the Ellsworth Mountains 1. Glossopteris cf. tortuosa, x 2; 2. Orbiculoidea cf. falklandensis, x1.5; 3. Euomphalopsis splettstoesseri, x3; 4. Antarcticocyathus webersi, x2.5; 5. Billingsella cf. borukaevi, x3.5; 6. Knightoconus antarcticus, x3; 7. Ribeiria australiensis, x10; 8. Proplina rutfordi, x10; 9. Angulotreta ellsworthensis, x30; 10. Sohoplura drakensis, x6; 11. Onchopeltis cf. neutra, x6; 12. Pseudobergeronites spinosa, x3; 13. Glyptagnostus reticulatus, x6; 14. Pagetia edsonensis, x3.4; 15. Tomagnostella sp., x8.

=== Minaret Formation in Late Cambrian ===
Phyla, gastropods, mollusks, and other faunal groups have been gathered and preserved as fossils in the Late Cambrian Minaret Formation.

==== Late Cambrian trilobite-mollusk fauna at Springer Peak ====
The Minaret Formation's feather-edge, which is 8 metres thick and thickens to a depth of 600 metres to the south, contains the Late Cambrian trilobite-mollusk fauna at Springer Peak. The southern fossils, however, were obliterated by significant deformation. The fauna is still notable since it may be the finest preserved and most diversified Late Cambrian fauna in the whole globe. This fauna contains members of seven phyla, including the Arthropoda, Mollusca, Brachiopoda, Hyolitha, Echinodermata, Pisces, and Archaeocyatha. The feather-edge at Springer Peak was sandwiched between the feeble argillites that absorbed the deformational strain. The Minaret Formation is home to three-dimensional fossils. Shells are present, and the fauna is in superb condition. Coquina fossils make up the majority of the content.

The bulk of the fossils discovered in the Minaret Formation are trilobites, while 8% of them are mollusks. Twenty species of trilobites have been discovered, including agnostids. They have demonstrated connections with southern Russia, Australia, China, and North America. There are three species of rostroconchs, six species of gastropods, an orthothecid, and even species of monoplacophora for the mollusc.

In the Late Cambrian faunas, monoplacophorans are often quite uncommon. At Springer Peak, however, monoplacophorans are abundant and diversified. The monoplacs are thought to be the ancestors of gastropods, rostroconchs, bivalves, and cephalopods. Monoplacs typically have a low profile, a cap form, and a single shell. They include a variety of high-coned forms for the monoplacs discovered in Springer Peak. One of these monoplacs, the Knightoconus, a multiseptate species with a high cone but without the siphuncle of cephalopods, is an example of a group that predates cephalopods. The oldest known cephalopods are from China and are only somewhat more recent. They are somewhat longer than the Knightoconus, and unlike the Knightoconus, they feature a tiny siphuncle along the middle border. Both types are multiseptate and similarly bent, however.

Three species of rostroconchs and six species of gastropods are also present. The rostroconchs are thought to have lived like the clams we see now since they resemble them in terms of appearance but only had one shell. Also discovered was a single species of an orthothecid.

==== Late Cambrian mollusks ====
China, Australia, and North America are discovered to have large populations of Late Cambrian mollusks. The Taylor Falls, Minnesota, USA, molluskan fauna and the Minaret mollusks are most similar. Although the mollusks are poorly preserved as both internal and exterior moulds in sandstone.

==== Various forms found in Minaret fauna ====
Along with the discovery of the first known Late Cambrian archaeocyathid, pelmatozoa columnals that covered several bedding surfaces were also noted. A single species of articulate brachiopod, nine species of inarticulate brachiopods, and ten species of conodonts were also found in the minaret fauna.

=== Lower Devonian fauna ===
In the Heritage Range, which makes up the southernmost portion of the Ellsworth Mountains, the lower Devonian fauna may be found close to Planck Point. Although the distribution of fossils in the fauna is modest, the collection is diversified. This fauna's most frequent fossil is an inarticulate brachiopod called Orbiculoidea cf. falklandensis. Two species of bivalves, one species of each of a cephalopod, rostroconch, gastropod, conularid, trilobite, and articulate brachiopod, as well as other types of fossils, were discovered. Additionally, one fish spine was found. The Lower Devonian of the Horlick Formation, the Ohio Range, the Horlick Mountains, and the Lower Devonian of the Falkland Islands are discovered to have a correlate with the fauna.

=== A Middle-to-Late Permian flora ===
The Polarstar Formation in the northern Sentinel Range has four locations where fossils of the Middle to Late Permian flora have been found. Glossopteris species make up the majority of the plant species. There are two species of Gangamopteris and Sphenophyta in the flora, respectively. The flora of the Ohio Range of the Horlick Mountains, the Theron Mountains, the Whichaway Nunataks, southern Victoria Land, and the Falkland Islands are determined to be the most comparable to that of the Ellsworth Mountains.

== Tectonic history ==
The whole stratigraphic succession of the Ellsworth Mountains has undergone low-grade regional metamorphism and has been severely distorted. The tectonic grains display parallelism to the mountain axes. Rocks typically exhibit cleavages and folds, as well as joints and small defects. The cleavage drops sharply in a southwesterly direction. The cleavage is parallel to the folds' axial plane. The cleavage fracture is well retained and of medium to high quality in slates, as well as in marble, quartzite, greywacke, and conglomerate.

Folds with axes that descend 5 degrees to the northwest and are nearly parallel to the trend of the mountains were created as a result of deformation. Outcrops also contain a variety of folds, including symmetric, asymmetric, inverted, recumbent, chevron, and isoclinal folds. The axial planes of the majority of the folds are either asymmetric or flipped, and they drop sharply to the east. The Whiteout Conglomerate has a vast variety of wavelengths, ranging from 15m in medium- to thick-bedded quartzites to 3000m.

There are also many joints and tiny faults, many of which are oblique and created by shearing after folding. The Heritage Range contains two significant strike faults.

During the Permian-Triassic Gonwanian orogeny, contraction deformation affected the whole Cambrian to Permian geologic sequence of the Ellsworth Mountains. The Late Permian Deformation formed mesoscale folds which have an axial planar cleavage and/or thrust fault (a minor reverse fault). The Cambrian to Permian era strata may contain Late Permian structures. These structures may also be transected counterclockwise or refolded by Permian-Triassic deformation. The lineations produced along the fault which found within the mylonites regarded as a representation of the early Permian-Triassic Deformation. The early Permian-Triassic crenulated bedding-parallel mylonites, which underwent extensive folding and created penetrative regional cleavage in terms of pure and dextral shear, treated as a proxy for the principal Permian-Triassic structures. Late Triassic Deformation features including kink bands, crenulation cleavages, and small faults, have demonstrated how a triaxial strain system facilitated the expansion of the Ellsworth Mountains.

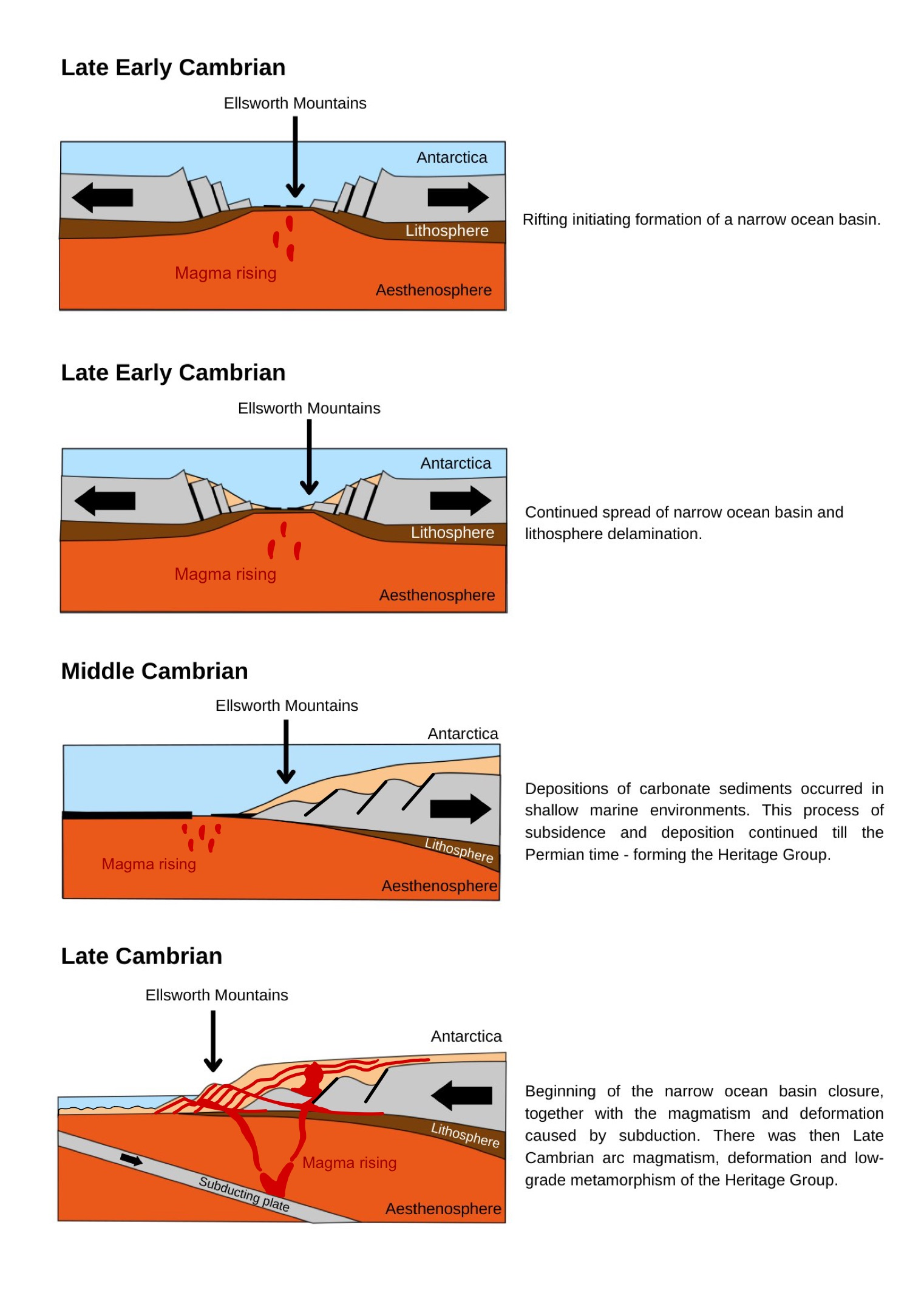
Evolutionary Diagram of Cambrian Rift of the Ellsworth Mountains

=== Cambrian rift structure ===
In the Early Cambrian to Late Cambrian, the Ellsworth Mountains were located in an ensialic rift basin at the paleo-Pacific boundary of Gondwana. It is dominated by the siliciclastic Heritage Group, a syn-rift fill. There are also localised occurrences of Middle Cambrian extensional growth faults, block tilting, and associated intraformational unconformities. These have been shown to be closely related to the rift-related basaltic volcanic and subvolcanic rocks' extrusion and intrusion. A location with consistently sinking sedimentary strata in the Liberty Hills Formation is the High Nunatak, Horseshoe Valley. The formation is intruded by basic dikes from upper Middle Cambrian rift volcanoes and features a number of extensional growth faults that range in size from decimeters to metres. The claim is supported by stratigraphic evidence that crosses the contact in some places and demonstrates structural continuity between the two sedimentary groups. Additionally, it is stated that the Heritage Group was unaffected by the end-Cambrian orogeny and that the boundary indicates the change from rifted to passive margin.

The Anderson Massif has Middle Cambrian tectonic features where master-scale extensional faults having the horst and graben geometry frequently offset the basal contact of a pillow-basalt unit.

=== Late Permian deformation structure ===
The strikes that form a counterclockwise oblique angle to Late Permian Deformation in stratigraphic formations, ranging in age from Middle Cambrian, Cambrian-Ordovician, to Permian age, are shown to have a consistent spatial relationship with Late Permian Deformation structure and regionally developed Permian-Triassic Deformation Gondwanian structures. The Late Permian Deformation structures that evolved in the Cambrian age rocks formed at the same time as those in the Permian Polarstar Formation based on these geographical and stratigraphic correlations. Since the primary Gondwanian deformation occurred during the Permian-Triassic period, the Late Permian Deformation structures must have originated after the Permian Polarstar Formation was deposited but before that period. It is also recognised as the long-lasting Permian–Triassic Gondwanian orogen's predecessor event.

=== Permian-Triassic deformationstructure ===
It is discovered that the whole strata exposed in the Ellsworth Mountains has been impacted by the Permian-Triassic Deformation structure, which is a well-developed NNW-SSE structural grain. This took place during the Permian-Triassic Gondwanian progeny orogenesis along an inferred Andean-style boundary.

==== Early Permian-Triassic deformation ====
The 5 cm thick bedding parallel mylonite, which developed within the sedimentary rock strata of both the Heritage Group and the Crashsite Group, represents the early Permian-Triassic Deformation. The metamorphic rock known as mylonites is fine-grained, compact, foliated, and lined, and it typically exhibits severe ductile deformation. Around the large-scale fold structures, which contain substantial quantities of bedding parallel slip in some mylonite zones, extensive shear planes on a small scale may be delineated. The regional Permian-Triassic Deformation structural grain (153°) and the lineations seen in early Permian-Triassic Deformation mylonites (237° - 057°) generally connect at right angles.

==== Main Permian-Triassic deformation ====
Strong regional consistency is evident in the strikes of the major Permian-Triassic Deformation structures, which strike at NW-SE (153° - 333°) from the northern Sentinel Range to the southern Heritage Range before changing to minor angle of strikes in NW-SE (135° - 315°) in the southern Horseshoe Valley.

First-order folds are found to have wavelengths of roughly 20–25 kilometres. Different fold orders were formed as a result of intense folding and cleavage development brought on by the significant Gondwanian deformation. Lower order folds are found to be upright to inclined with the fold axes gradually dipping about the horizontal by observation.

The stretching lineation's mean is discovered to be orientated in 71/233, indicating that the cleavage plane served as the setting for its approximately downdip elongation. It is discovered that dextral shear domains occur concurrently with the nearby strike-parallel coaxial and non-coaxial shear domains that contain downdip stretching lineations.

A model that depicts the tectonic setting of the Ellsworth Mountains during the Gondwanian deformation shows that the mountains were in a dextral transpressive system that was dominated by shear and that the strike-slip component was partitioned pretty well. Approximately 67% of the strike-slip component has been regarded as strike-parallel dextral shear, but the remaining 33% has not been recognised.

=== Late Triassic deformation structure ===
The Late Triassic Deformation structure, also known as the late stage of Gondwanian structure, is the result of a series of kink bands and small faults with accompanying drag folds. It is the post-axial-plane cleavage structure. The Ellsworth Mountains are observed to have the highest extensional faulting, crenulation cleavage, and extensional kink bands. It is thought that the extensional collapse of the Gondwanian orogen may be connected to all of the Late Triassic Deformation formations. Since the precise timing of Late Triassic Deformation to Permian-Triassic Deformation is unknown, another possibility is that the extensional system was created during the uplift of the Ellsworth Mountains during the Early Cretaceous, which was brought on by the original division of West and East Antarctica and the emergence of the Weddell Sea.

The bimodal group of moderately inclined structures' faults and crenulation cleavage strike roughly parallel to the structural grain of the Permian-Triassic Deformation. The incipient flaws are what bind the kink bands, which range in width from a small crenulation to 5 cm. The border faults frequently contain a traditional range of structures, from mature and throughgoing faults to early discontinuous, synthetic, and en echelon structures.

=== Tectonic movements of Ellsworth-Whitmore Mountains ===
The Ellsworth-Whitemore Mountains, which are named after the Ellsworth and Whitmore Mountain ranges, had rotated 90 degrees counterclockwise during the Gondwana Breakup, before the Invasion of Middle Jurassic Peraluminous Granite, and after the Permo-Triassic Gondwanide Orogeny. This occurred during the Gondwana Breakup.

Additional paleomagnetic data is gathered in the Ellsworth-Whitmore Mountains, Thurston Island, and the Antarctic Peninsula. It hypothesised that during the Middle Jurassic and Early Cretaceous, these three blocks and West Gondwana joined together as a single unit like supercontinent moving with only little rotation. These three blocks experienced a 30° clockwise rotation with regard to east Antarctica between the Early and Middle Cretaceous, which resulted in a sinistral shear of around 750 km. The Ellsworth-Whitmore Mountains were at their current location in relation to East Antarctica circa 110 Ma ago.

=== Early Cretaceous uplift in the Ellsworth Mountains of West Antarctica ===
It is standard practise to resolve the uplift and denudation histories of mountain ranges using apatite fission-track analyses. The apatite track retention temperature range may be impacted by the cooling pace and composition of the mineral. In order to examine the Early Cretaceous uplift in the Ellsworth Mountains, this methodology is employed.

Analysis of the apatite in the Crashsite quartzite reveals that it has several chemical characteristics with the apatite found in Durango. A common benchmark for defining the tracks kept at temperatures less than or equal to 110 °C for cooling rates of 0.1 to 10 °C per million years during geologic time is the Durango apatite. Tracks will instantly anneal if the temperature is higher than 110 °C. The tracks will progressively anneal at lower temperatures, such as those below 60 °C. Track length decrease, a sign of partial annealing, is gradually quicker in the partial annealing zone, where temperatures range from 60 to 110 degrees Celsius. The creation of tracks never stops throughout time. A sample's time-temperature route may be inferred from the relative proportions of long and short tracks that are created.

The samples from the Crashsite Group that were gathered near Bowers Corner and on the western flank of the Vinson Massif have apatite ages dated on them. The age increases with elevation and is defined by a slope of around 200 metres per million years. It ranges from 141 5 Ma at the summit of the Massif to 117 5 Ma for the lowest sample. The exhumation rate, sometimes referred to as the unroofing rate, is what is meant by the slope and is caused by denudation in reaction to uplift. The weighted mean of the track length distributions is 13.9 m. It shows that the samples didn't spend a lot of time in the partial annealing zone and that they quickly cooled. This indicates that the Early Cretaceous epoch, which lasted for just over 20 million years, had major uplift and denudation of at least 4 km.

== Ellsworth-Whitmore Mountains tectonostratigraphic correlation ==
The pre-Gondwana breakup location of the Ellsworth Mountains in South Africa and the Weddell Sea region of the paleo-Pacific Margin are shown to have strong geological ties. Several long-lasting orogenic events, including as the Ross orogeny in Antarctica, the Saldana orogeny in South Africa, and the Delamerian orogeny in Australia, took place along this boundary during the Cambrian period. However, as the correlated orogenic event could not be detected in the Ellsworth Mountains, the crustal block on which the Ellsworth Mountains are situated has come to be viewed as geologically mysterious. The only evidence is that the rocks of the Ellsworth Mountains were created in a Cambrian extensional rift environment.

Geochronological information on the early Paleozoic history of the Cape fold belt shows that southern South Africa was likely that located in a continental rift basin during the Middle to Late Cambrian period. As a result, the significant early Paleozoic tectonostratigraphic connection lends credence to the theory that the Ellsworth-Whitmore Mountains were situated close to southern Africa at the period of pre-Gondwana breakup.

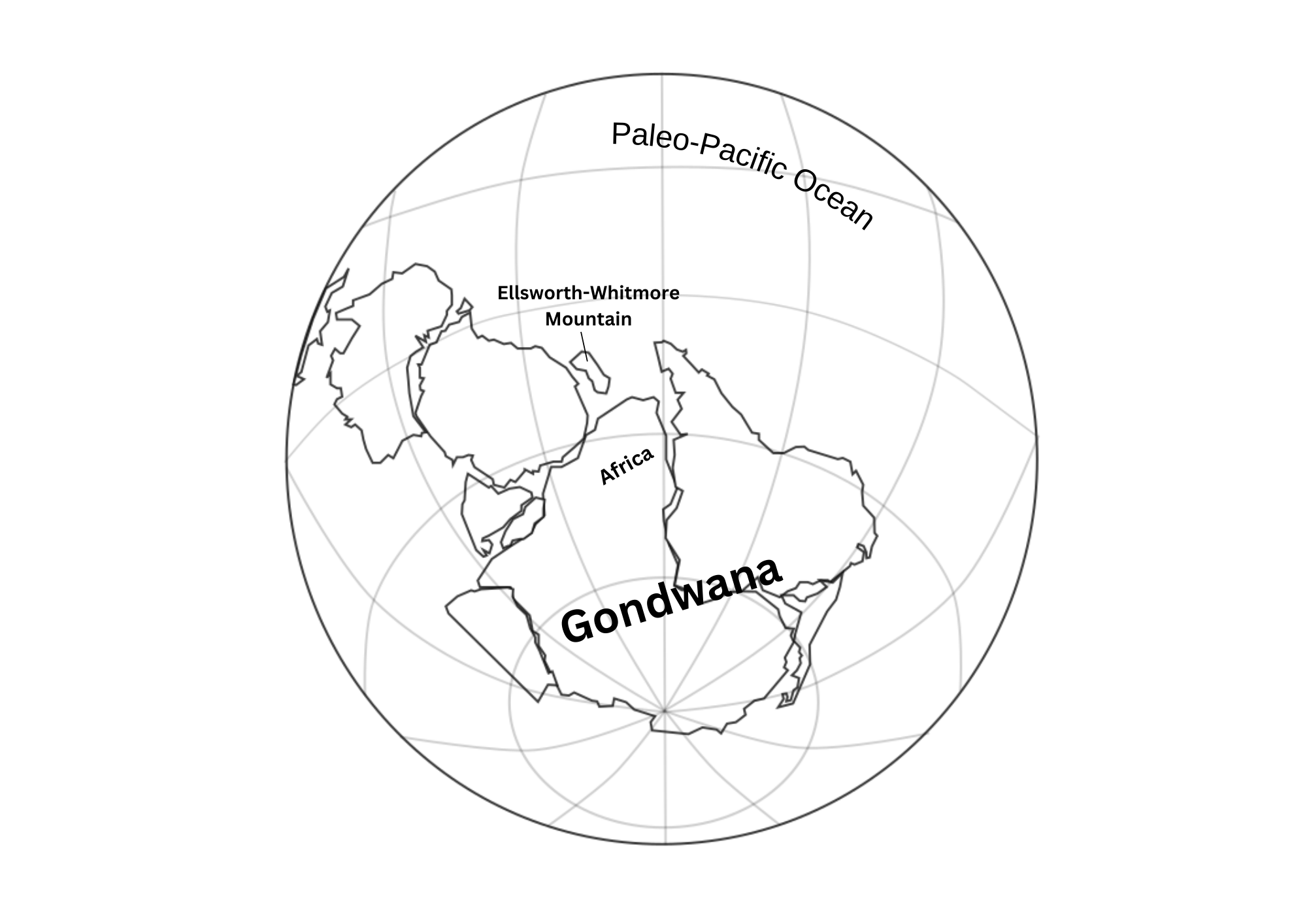
Gondwana Map Tectonic models for the Middle to Late Cambrian paleo-Pacific margin of Gondwana.

=== Southern african sector of the Paleo-Pacific margin ===
End-Neoproterozoic to Paleozoic rocks that were a part of the southern African sector of the paleo-Pacific margin of Gondwana have been exposed by the Cape fold belt in South Africa. It is hypothesised that a regional peneplain—a low-relief plain created by stream erosion—developed in the Cape Peninsular region around roughly 520 Ma in the Early Cambrian. The Table Mountain Group rocks, which are located above the deformed granites and metasediments of the Saldanian basement with a striking unconformity, have had detrital zircon dating done on them.

A Middle to Late Cambrian paleogeographic reconstruction is made using a commonly accepted reconstruction of Gondwana, which places the crustal block of the Ellsworth-Whitmore Mountains oceanward of the Cape fold belt. The two zones that make up a basin are discovered to be congruent with the reconstruction. Local scale alluvial sedimentation occurs in the Cape fold belt, with the Saldanian orogen serving as the sediment source. The whole Ellsworth Mountain Cambrian geologic sequence, which culminated in the eruption of mid-oceanic ridge-type basalts in the late Middle Cambrian, was formed in a marine environment. The succession was located closer to the rift axis.

Geochronological and geobarometric studies in the western Cape fold belt suggest that the Saldanian belt may have undergone uplift and erosion prior to the Middle Cambrian rifting event that happened as fast as the rate of crustal thickening in the present. The Heritage Group's Middle Cambrian sedimentary strata include Early Cambrian granite clasts. It suggests that the Ellsworth Mountains Cambrian basin's origin area had a quick uplift and erosion.

The geology of the Ellsworth Mountains and the Middle Cambrian to Permian are related, as shown by the tectonostratigraphic history of the Cape fold belt. Before the Ordovician, these areas were a part of a Middle to Late Cambrian rift basin setting that, with the emplacement of the Cape Supergroup and the Crashsite Group, transformed into a passive margin.

=== East Antarctic sector of the Paleo-Pacific margin ===
The Beardmore folding event which folded metasedimentary rocks are unconformably under the Early to Middle Cambrian rock strata, which is observed in the stratigraphic rock cores in the middle Transantarctic Mountains and the Pensacola Mountains.

In the late Neoproterozoic and early Paleozoic, two geographically distinct deformation events dominated the East Antarctic region of the Gondwanan paleo-Pacific border. The sedimentary strata that originated in the middle Transantarctic Mountains and the Pensacola Mountains as a result of the Beardmore orogeny during the Late Neoproterozoic to Early Cambrian were folded by the earlier one, which took place during the end-Neoproterozoic.

As a result of the Beardmore folding event, Victoria Land was subject to deformation and magmatism during the entire Cambrian period. Early to Middle Cambrian and Middle to Late Cambrian volcanic rock was deposited in the central Transantarctic Mountains, whereas the carbonate rock in the same periods was deposited in the Pensacola Mountains. Due to destructive edge tectonics that underwent compressional stress, the Ross deformation in the Late Cambrian had an effect on these geologic successions.

The extensive, subduction-related granites in the Transantarctic Mountains, known as the Granite Harbour Intrusives, underwent during and after the volcanism. The Transantarctic Mountains' Late Cambrian deformation along the Ross Sea sector had an effect on these intrusives as well. Deposits formed during and after the orogeny can be found in the Bowers terrane in northern Victoria Land, the Pensacola Mountains, and the middle Transantarctic Mountains. These folded Cambrian sedimentary successions covered by Ordovician successions with varying degrees of unconformity were discovered, indicating that the Ross orogeny was a prolonged deformation process that continued into the Early Ordovician.

An angular unconformity was found under the subhorizontal Devonian to Triassic deposits of the Beacon Supergroup, which were produced by Kukri erosional surface near the Transantarctic Mountains. As one approaches the Pensacola Mountains, structural and stratigraphic unconformity is seen to diminish.

A key difference in early Paleozoic histories is seen when comparing the tectonostratigraphy of the Pensacola Mountains with those of the Ellsworth Mountains and South Africa. It is found that during the Middle and End-Cambrian, the southern African part of Gondwana's paleo-Pacific boundary, including the Ellsworth-Whitmore Mountains, underwent a transition from rifting to passive margin.

A tectonic history between the end of the Neoproterozoic and the early Cambrian is therefore shown to be shared by the Pensacola Mountains and the southern African portion of the paleo-Pacific margin. The southern African sector, which includes the Ellsworth Mountains, was influenced by the Saldanian orogeny, whereas the Pensacola Mountains and the central Transantarctic Mountains underwent contractional deformation as a consequence of the Breadmore folding event or the first Ross orogeny.

Even though the Pensacola Mountains had bimodal volcanism from the Middle to Late Cambrian, the whole sequence of Cambrian sedimentary and volcanic rock had gone through considerable bending toward the end of the Cambrian to the beginning of the Ordovician epoch.

== Surveys done in the Ellsworth Mountains ==
The Ellsworth Mountains were first discovered by Lincoln Ellsworth in 1935 when he was on his flight from Dundee Island to Ross Ice Shelf. The first geological observation was done in 1958 by Charles R. Bentley who collected rocks from the northern Sentinel Range and did ground surveying to establish the positions of major peaks. Since then, geologists did field observation there and collected some rock specimens.

The Ellsworth Mountains' topographic map was created and released by the United States Geological Survey (USGS) in the 1960s. They were created using the United States Navy's aerial images as a foundation.

A small group of geologists, led by John J. Anderson, identified the Ellsworth Mountains' fundamental structure and upper stratigraphic units in 1961. Most of the western Sentinel Range and parts of the eastern Heritage Range were travelled on motor toboggans. The U.S. Army used helicopters to support the geologists between 1963 and 1964. This enables exploration and additional research of outcrops all over the mountains. Investigating the geology of the Ellsworth Mountains is a significant step forward. The British Antarctic Survey conducted airborne ice-sounding investigations of the highlands in 1975.

With 42 geologists and other researchers participating, the 1979–1980 season saw the Ellsworth Mountains' greatest geological field programme. Additionally, the U.S. Navy lends its helicopters to the programme. A team from the USGS resurveyed some mountainous areas and improved position and elevation control. For instance, the Vinson Massif's elevation has changed from 5140 metres to 4897 metres.
