= Hutto Peak =

Peak in the Heritage Range of mountains in Antarctica

Hutto Peak (79°17′S 85°53′W) is a sharp peak, 1,620 metres (5,300 ft) high, standing just below the Founders Escarpment on the ridge separating the upper portions of Gowan Glacier and Splettstoesser Glacier, in the Heritage Range of mountains in Antarctica. It was mapped by the United States Geological Survey from surveys and U.S. Navy air photos from 1961 to 1966, and was named by the Advisory Committee on Antarctic Names for Chief Yeoman Grey H. Hutto of the U.S. Navy who was a participant in Operation Deep Freeze in two austral seasons in Antarctica in the period 1964–66.

== See also ==
- Mountains in Antarctica
