= Herrin Peak =

Mountain in Antarctica

Herrin Peak (79°16′S 85°45′W) is a large snow-covered peak, 1,755 metres (5,760 ft) high, standing 6 nautical miles (11 km) south of Landmark Peak on the east side of Gowan Glacier, in the Heritage Range of Antarctica. It was named by the University of Minnesota Geological Party of 1963–64 for John M. Herrin, a helicopter crew chief with the 62nd Transportation Detachment, who assisted the party.

== See also ==
- Mountains in Antarctica
