= Unger Peak =

Mountain in Antarctica

Unger Peak (79°21′S 86°10′W) is a conspicuous, mainly ice-covered peak which rises above the plateau at the south end of Founders Escarpment. It stands 2 nautical miles (3.7 km) north-northwest of Zavis Peak in the Heritage Range, Ellsworth Mountains. It was mapped by the United States Geological Survey (USGS) from surveys and U.S. Navy air photos from 1961 to 1966. It was named by the Advisory Committee on Antarctic Names (US-ACAN) for Lieutenant Maurice H. Unger of the U.S. Navy, a navigator on photographic flights over Marie Byrd and Ellsworth Lands during Operation Deep Freeze 1965 and 1966.
