= Dybvadskog Peak =

Mountain in Antarctica

Dybvadskog Peak (79°19′S 86°21′W) is a sharp, somewhat isolated peak, 2,180 metres (7,150 ft) high, the westernmost of those rising above the ice surface just west of the southern part of the Founders Escarpment, in the Heritage Range of the Ellsworth Mountains, Antarctica. It was mapped by the United States Geological Survey from surveys and U.S. Navy air photos, 1961–66, and was named by the Advisory Committee on Antarctic Names after Olav Dybvadskog, a Norwegian glaciologist who was a member of the United States Antarctic Research Program South Pole—Queen Maud Land Traverse I, 1964–65.

== See also ==
- Mountains in Antarctica
