= Gould Spur =

Coordinates: 79°21′S 85°40′W

Gould Spur is a spur, 3 nautical miles (6 km) long, that extends from Navigator Peak to the south side of Splettstoesser Glacier, in the Heritage Range of the Ellsworth Mountains, Antarctica. It was named by the Advisory Committee on Antarctic Names (2004) after Patricia Gould, a geologist on a U.S. Antarctic Research Program 1979–80 Ellsworth Mountains expedition.
