= Robinson Peak =

Mountain in Antarctica

Robinson Peak (79°23′S 83°58′W) is a sharp peak (2,040 m) on the ridge east of Rennell Glacier, standing 7 nautical miles (13 km) south of Mount Virginia in the Heritage Range. It was mapped by the United States Geological Survey (USGS) from surveys and U.S. Navy air photos, 1961–66, and was named by the Advisory Committee on Antarctic Names (US-ACAN) for Willard E. Robinson, a construction mechanic at Byrd Station in 1965. Robinson Peak was first successfully climbed on January 2–3, 2013 by Pachi Ibarra, Ralf Laier and Todd Passey.

== See also ==
- Mountains in Antarctica
