= Bingham Peak =

Mountain in Antarctica

Bingham Peak (79°26′S 84°47′W) is a sharp peak, 1,540 metres (5,050 ft) high, located 2.5 nautical miles (5 km) southeast of Springer Peak in the Heritage Range, Ellsworth Mountains. It was mapped by the United States Geological Survey from ground surveys and from U.S. Navy air photos, 1961–66, and named by the Advisory Committee on Antarctic Names for Joseph P. Bingham, an auroral scientist at Eights Station in 1965.

== See also ==
- Mountains in Antarctica
