= Cunningham Peak =

Mountain in Antarctica

Cunningham Peak (79°16′S 86°12′W) is a mainly ice-covered peak, 2,170 metres (7,120 ft) high, at the head of Gowan Glacier along the Founders Escarpment, in the Heritage Range. It was mapped by the United States Geological Survey from surveys and from U.S. Navy air photos, 1961–66, and named by the Advisory Committee on Antarctic Names for Ship's Serviceman John B. Cunningham, U.S. Navy, in charge of the McMurdo Station ship's store and laundry during U.S. Navy Operation Deep Freeze 1966.

== See also ==
- Mountains in Antarctica
