= Thompson Nunataks =

Thompson Nunataks (79°27′S 85°49′W) are three evenly spaced nunataks which lie 4 nautical miles (7 km) south of Navigator Peak and surmount the central part of White Escarpment in the Heritage Range, Ellsworth Mountains. Mapped by United States Geological Survey (USGS) from surveys and U.S. Navy air photos, 1961–66. Named by Advisory Committee on Antarctic Names (US-ACAN) for Russel W. Thompson, United States Antarctic Research Program (USARP) meteorologist at Wilkes Station, 1963.
