= Cagle Peaks =

Group of mountain peaks in Antarctica

The Cagle Peaks (79°33′S 85°28′W) are a group of sharp peaks that surmount the south end of White Escarpment in the Heritage Range. The group was named by the University of Minnesota geological party, 1963–64, for Major Paul M. Cagle, commanding officer and pilot of the helicopter detachment that assisted the party in the field.

== See also ==
- Mountains in Antarctica
