= Mhire Spur =

Mhire Spur (79°33′S 83°50′W) is a spur descending west from the heights associated with Mount Sporli to form the southern limit of Larson Valley, in the Heritage Range, Antarctica. It was mapped by the United States Geological Survey from surveys and U.S. Navy air photos, 1961–66, and was named by the Advisory Committee on Antarctic Names for chief equipment operator Clifford J. Mhire, U.S. Navy, who was responsible for supervising the movement of jet fuel from McMurdo Station to nearby Williams Field during Operation Deep Freeze 1966.
