= Mount Rodger =

Mountain in Ellsworth Land, Antarctica

Mount Rodger (79°42′S 83°34′W) is a sharp peak, 1,410 m, at the northwest end of Collier Hills in the Heritage Range in Antarctica. It was mapped by United States Geological Survey (USGS) from surveys and U.S. Navy air photos, 1961–66 and named by the Advisory Committee on Antarctic Names (US-ACAN) for Rodger A. Brown, meteorologist at Little America V Station in 1958.

== See also ==
- Mountains in Antarctica
