= Conglomerate Ridge =

Ridge in the Ellsworth Mountains, Antarctica

Conglomerate Ridge (79°45′S 84°6′W) is a ridge, 1 nautical mile (2 km) long, located 4 nautical miles (7 km) east-southeast of Mount Bursik in the Soholt Peaks, Heritage Range, Ellsworth Mountains of Antarctica. The ridge trends northwest–southeast and rises to about 1,650 metres (5,400 ft). It was so named from the conglomerate composition of the ridge by Gerald F. Webers, leader of the United States Antarctic Research Program Ellsworth Mountains Expedition, 1979–80.

== Geology ==
Detailed geological maps of the Heritage Range shows that Conglomerate Ridge consists of steeply inclined, 55 to 62 degrees, Cambrian, metasedimentary strata. In terms of increasing age, the Cambrian strata includes the Frazier Ridge, Conglomerate Ridge, Drake Icefall, and Union Glacier formations. The Frazier Ridge Formation consists mainly of fine- to medium-grained green quartzite that contains infrequent beds of green argillite and black shale. It is estimated to be at least 500 meters (1,600 ft) thick. It is underlain by the 600 meters (2,000 ft) of Conglomerate Ridge Formation, which is named for Conglomerate Ridge. It consists of 450 meters (1,480 ft) of buff, polymict, clast-supported conglomerate with beds of fine- to coarse-grained quartzite and overlying 150 meters (490 ft) of sheared gray, green, and buff argillaceous quartzite. Underlying the Conglomerate Ridge Formation is 500 to 800 meters (1,600 to 2,600 ft) of intensively sheared and folded black shale and interlayered limestone of the Drake Icefall Formation. It overlies an unknown thickness of the Union Glacier Formation. The Union Glacier Formation consists of over 3,000 meters (9,800 ft) of dark green tuffaceous diamictite, which contains minor layers of tuffaceous rocks, metamorphosed buff calcareous sandstone, and buff calcareous conglomerate. Trilobite fossils from the Drake Icefall and other formations within the Heritage Group indicate that all of these units accumulated during the Middle Cambrian.
