= Mount Johns =

Mount Johns may refer to:

- Mount Johns, Northern Territory, a suburb of Alice Springs
- Mount Johns (Ellsworth Mountains), a mountain in Antarctica
- Mount Johns (Prince Charles Mountains), a mountain in Antarctica

== See also ==
- Mount John University Observatory
