= Three Sails =

Nunatak

Three Sails (80°27′S 80°42′W) is a three small isolated nunataks in a row, located 6 nautical miles (11 km) east of Redpath Peaks at the south extremity of the Heritage Range, Ellsworth Mountains. The descriptive name was applied by the University of Minnesota Geological Party to the area, 1963–64.
