= Charles Peak =

Mountain in Antarctica

Charles Peak (79°44′S 83°11′W) is a bare rock peak in Antarctica, 990 metres (3,250 ft) high, surmounting the southeast end of the Collier Hills in the Heritage Range. It was mapped by the United States Geological Survey from surveys and from U.S. Navy air photos, 1961–66, and named by the Advisory Committee on Antarctic Names for Charles E. Williams, a meteorologist at Little America V Station in 1958.

== See also ==
- Mountains in Antarctica
