= Planck Point =

Planck Point (79°18′S 85°11′W) is a snow-covered, spur-like point along the north side of Splettstoesser Glacier, located 10 nautical miles (18 km) southeast of Landmark Peak in the Heritage Range. Named by the University of Minnesota Geological Party to the area, 1963–64, for Russell E. Planck, helicopter crew chief with the 62nd Transportation Detachment, who assisted the party.
