= Connell Canyon =

Coordinates: 79°51′S 83°1′W

Connell Canyon is a scenic ice-filled canyon in the northwest part of the Enterprise Hills, extending from Linder Peak to Union Glacier, in the Heritage Range, Antarctica. It was mapped by the United States Geological Survey from surveys and from U.S. Navy air photos, 1961–1966, and named by the Advisory Committee on Antarctic Names for Lieutenant Davis B. Connell, U.S. Navy, supply officer at McMurdo Station in Operation Deepfreeze 1965 and 1966.
