= Carnell Peak =

Mountain in Antarctica

Carnell Peak (79°28′S 85°17′W) is a peak, 1,730 metres (5,680 ft) high, in the Watlack Hills, situated 2.5 nautical miles (5 km) from the southeast end of the group, in the Heritage Range, Ellsworth Mountains. It was mapped by the United States Geological Survey from surveys and from U.S. Navy air photos, 1961–1966, and named by the Advisory Committee on Antarctic Names for Lieutenant D.L. Carnell, Civil Engineer Corps, U.S. Navy, maintenance officer at Williams Field, McMurdo Sound, in the 1965–66 season, who was responsible for the first piercing of the Ross Ice Shelf at 50 meters.

== See also ==
- Mountains in Antarctica
