= Mount Johns (Ellsworth Mountains) =

Mountain in Ellsworth Land, Antarctica

Mount Johns (79°37′S 91°14′W) is a solitary nunatak rising 90 metres (300 ft) above the ice surface, about 50 nautical miles (93 km) west of the Heritage Range, in the Ellsworth Mountains of Antarctica. It was discovered by the Charles R. Bentley-led Marie Byrd Land Traverse Party on January 27, 1958, and was named for Robert H. Johns (1932–58), an International Geophysical Year Byrd Station meteorologist in 1957 who died in the Arctic following his tour of duty at Byrd Station.

== See also ==
- Mountains in Antarctica
