= Larson Valley =

Valley in Antarctica

Coordinates: 79°32′S 83°51′W

Larson Valley is a relatively smooth, ice-filled valley between the south end of Inferno Ridge and Mhire Spur in the Heritage Range, Antarctica. It was mapped by the United States Geological Survey from surveys and U.S. Navy air photos 1961–66, and was named by the Advisory Committee on Antarctic Names for equipment operator D. L. Larson, U.S. Navy, a snow removal operator at Williams Field, McMurdo Sound, during Operation Deep Freeze 1965 and 1966.
