= Mount Verne =

Mountain in Graham Land, Antarctica

- Location within Antarctica

Highest point
- Elevation: 1,632 m (5,354 ft)
- Prominence: 1,632 m (5,354 ft)
- Listing: Ultra, Ribu
- Coordinates: 67°40′S 67°30′W

Geography
- Location: Pourquoi Pas Island, Antarctica

Climbing
- First ascent: February 1991 by Marco Preti and Jacapo Merrizi
- Easiest route: snow/ice . **All this first ascent info is incorrect derived from book by Damien Gildea which is also incorrect as confirmed by Damien Gildea. First ascent was in fact by Jim Steen and Dave Matthews on Wednesday 3 November 1965 at 4pm local time. For verification, report filed in British Antarctic Survey archives. Gildea is aware. Signed D Matthews 2016

Mount Verne is a mountain (1,632 m) standing 6 nautical miles (11 km) east of Bongrain Point and dominating the south part of Pourquoi Pas Island, off the west coast of Graham Land. It was first sighted and roughly surveyed in 1909 by the French Antarctic Expedition under Charcot, and then resurveyed in 1948 by the Falkland Islands Dependencies Survey (FIDS). It was named by them for Jules Verne, the author of Twenty Thousand Leagues Under the Seas. Other features on Pourquoi Pas Island are named after characters in this book.

== See also ==
- List of ultras of Antarctica
