= Mount Bursik =

Mountain in Ellsworth Land, Antarctica

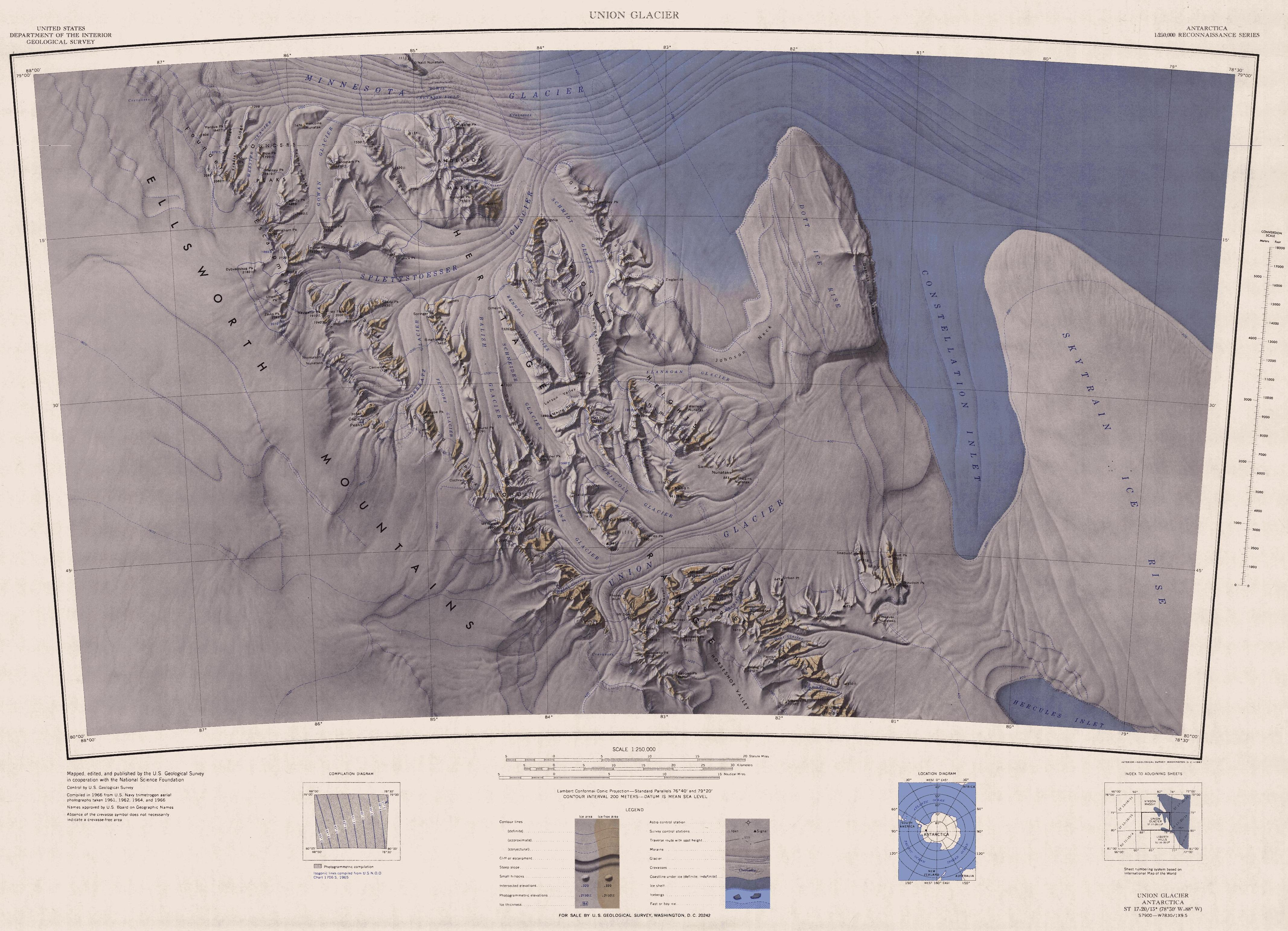
Mount Bursik

Mount Bursik (79°43′S 84°23′W) is the central peak, 2,500 metres (8,200 ft) high, of the Soholt Peaks, in the Heritage Range, Ellsworth Mountains. It was mapped by the United States Geological Survey from ground surveys and from U.S. Navy air photos, 1961–66, and named by the Advisory Committee on Antarctic Names for Captain Vlada D. Bursik, U.S. Navy, Deputy Commander, U.S. Navy Support Force, Antarctica, during Operation Deep Freeze 1966.

== See also ==
- Mountains in Antarctica
