= Weaver Nunataks =

Mountain in Antarctica

Highest point
- Coordinates: 79°51′S 81°11′W

Geography
- Parent range: Nunataks in Heritage Range

Weaver Nunataks is a cluster of nunataks just south of Meyer Hills in the Heritage Range. Mapped by United States Geological Survey (USGS) from surveys and U.S. Navy air photos, 1961–66. Named by Advisory Committee on Antarctic Names (US-ACAN) for William E. Weaver, United States Antarctic Research Program (USARP) meteorologist at Ellsworth Station, 1962.
