= Navigator Peak =

Mountain peak

Navigator Peak (79°23′S 85°48′W) is a sharp and prominent peak, 1,910 m, standing 4 nautical miles (7 km) east of Zavis Peak in the north part of the White Escarpment, Heritage Range, in Antarctica. It was named by the University of Minnesota Geological Party to these mountains in 1963–64 because the peak served as a landmark to navigators and pilots returning to camp from flights in the southern part of the Heritage Range.

== See also ==
- Mountains in Antarctica
