= Mount Sporli =

Mountain in Ellsworth Land, Antarctica

Mount Sporli (79°33′S 83°36′W) is a prominent mountain, 2,255 m, standing at the east side of the head of Driscoll Glacier in the Pioneer Heights, Heritage Range. It was named by the University of Minnesota Geological Party to these mountains in 1963–64 for Bernhard K. Sporli, a geologist with the party. Mount Sporli was first successfully climbed on 17 December 2011 by Simon Abrahams, Ralf Laier and Todd Passey.
