= Redpath Peaks =

Mountain range in Antarctica

Redpath Peaks (80°28′S 81°18′W) is a cluster of low, snow-covered peaks lying 3 nautical miles (6 km) southeast of Mount Shattuck and the Independence Hills, at the south extremity of the Heritage Range, Ellsworth Mountains. They were named by the Advisory Committee on Antarctic Names (US-ACAN) for Bruce B. Redpath, a United States Antarctic Research Program (USARP) geophysicist on the South Pole—Queen Maud Land Traverse I of 1964–65.

== See also ==
- Mountains in Antarctica
