= Mount Shattuck =

Mountain in Ellsworth Land, Antarctica

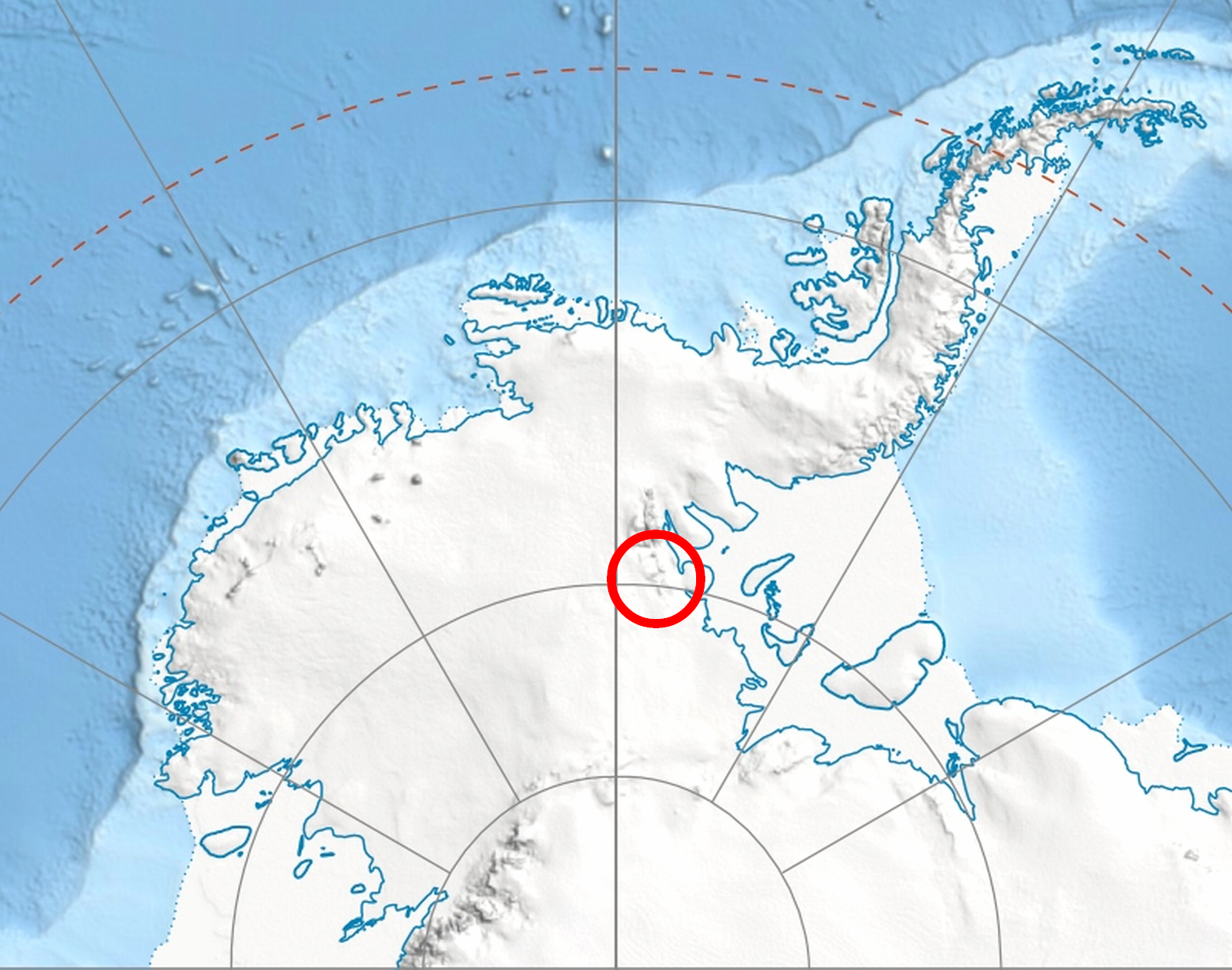
Location of Heritage Range in Western Antarctica.

Mount Shattuck (80°26′S 81°28′W) is a peak, 1,430 m, located at the south end of Independence Hills, about 3 miles (4.8 km) northwest of Redpath Peaks, in the Heritage Range. It was named by the Advisory Committee on Antarctic Names (US-ACAN) for aviation machinist Wayne M. Shattuck of the U.S. Navy, who was an air crewman on LC-47 aircraft, who perished in a crash on the Ross Ice Shelf on February 2, 1966.
