= Zavis Peak =

Mountain in Antarctica

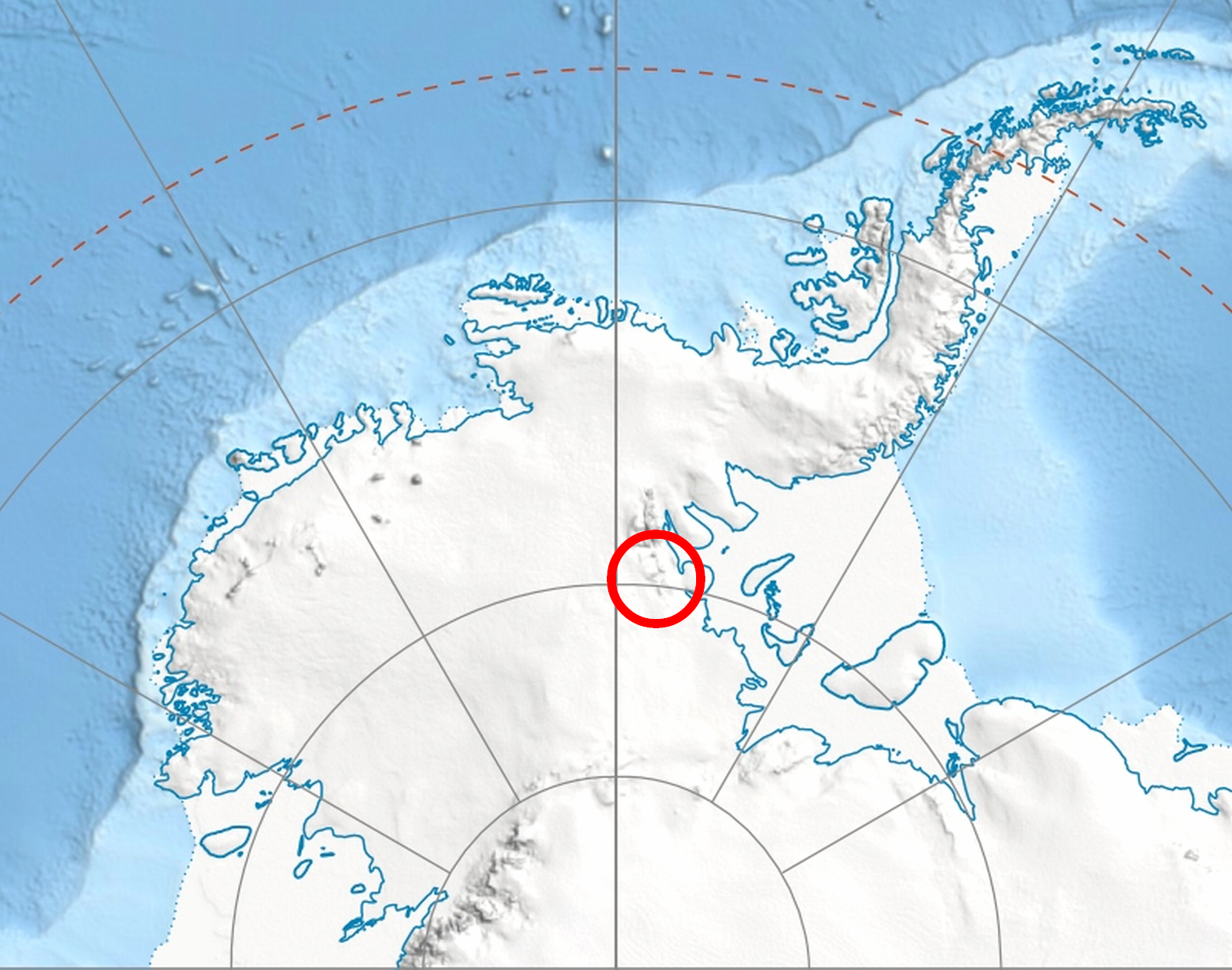
Location of Heritage Range in Western Antarctica.

Zavis Peak (79°23′S 86°8′W) is a sharp peak, 2,195 metres (7,201 ft), standing 4 miles (6 km) west of Navigator Peak at the south end of Founders Escarpment in the Heritage Range. It was named by the University of Minnesota Geological Party of 1963–64 for Alfred Zavis, a United States Geological Survey (USGS) topographic engineer with the party in these mountains.
