= Landmark Peak =

Mountain in Antarctica

Landmark Peak (79°10′S 85°40′W) is a very prominent peak, 1,840 metres (6,040 ft) high, standing 5 nautical miles (9 km) south of Minnesota Glacier on the east side of Gowan Glacier, in the Heritage Range, Antarctica. It was named by the University of Minnesota Geological Party to these mountains in 1963–64 because the peak is a well used reference point for pilots flying in the area.

== See also ==
- Mountains in Antarctica
