= Driscoll Glacier =

Glacier in Antarctica

- Location within Antarctica
- Location: Ellsworth Land
- Coordinates: 79°42′S 83°00′W
- Length: 13 nautical miles (24 km; 15 mi)
- Thickness: unknown
- Terminus: Union Glacier
- Status: unknown

Driscoll Glacier is a glacier 13 nautical miles (24 km) long in the Heritage Range, draining southeast between the Collier Hills and the Buchanan Hills to enter Union Glacier. It was mapped by the United States Geological Survey from surveys and U.S. Navy air photos, 1961–66, and was named by the Advisory Committee on Antarctic Names for Commander Jerome M. Driscoll, an administration officer with U.S. Navy Squadron VX-6 during Operation Deep Freeze 1965.

== See also ==
- List of glaciers in the Antarctic
- Glaciology
