= Rennell Glacier =

Glacier in Antarctica

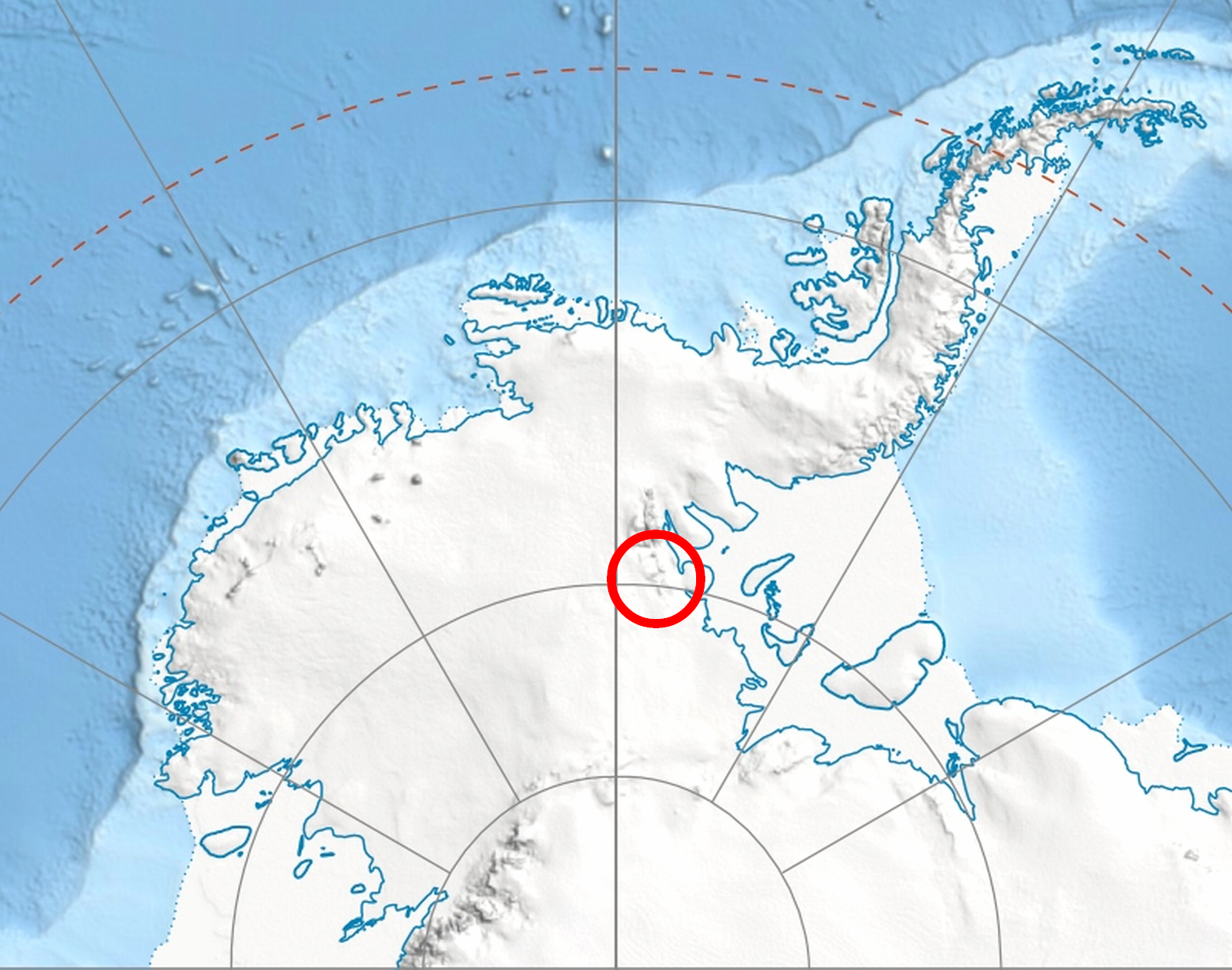
- Location of Heritage Range in Western Antarctica

- Location within Antarctica
- Type: tributary
- Location: Ellsworth Land
- Coordinates: 79°23′00″S 84°12′00″W
- Length: 10 nautical miles (19 km; 12 mi)
- Thickness: unknown
- Terminus: Splettstoesser Glacier
- Status: unknown

Rennell Glacier (79°23′S 84°12′W) is a glacier, 10 nautical miles (19 km; 12 mi) long, in the Pioneer Heights, Heritage Range. It drains northwest, to the east of Inferno Ridge, to join Splettstoesser Glacier. Named by the University of Minnesota Geological Party to these mountains, 1963–64, for K.P. Rennell, biologist with the party.
