= Heritage Range =

Mountain range in Antarctica

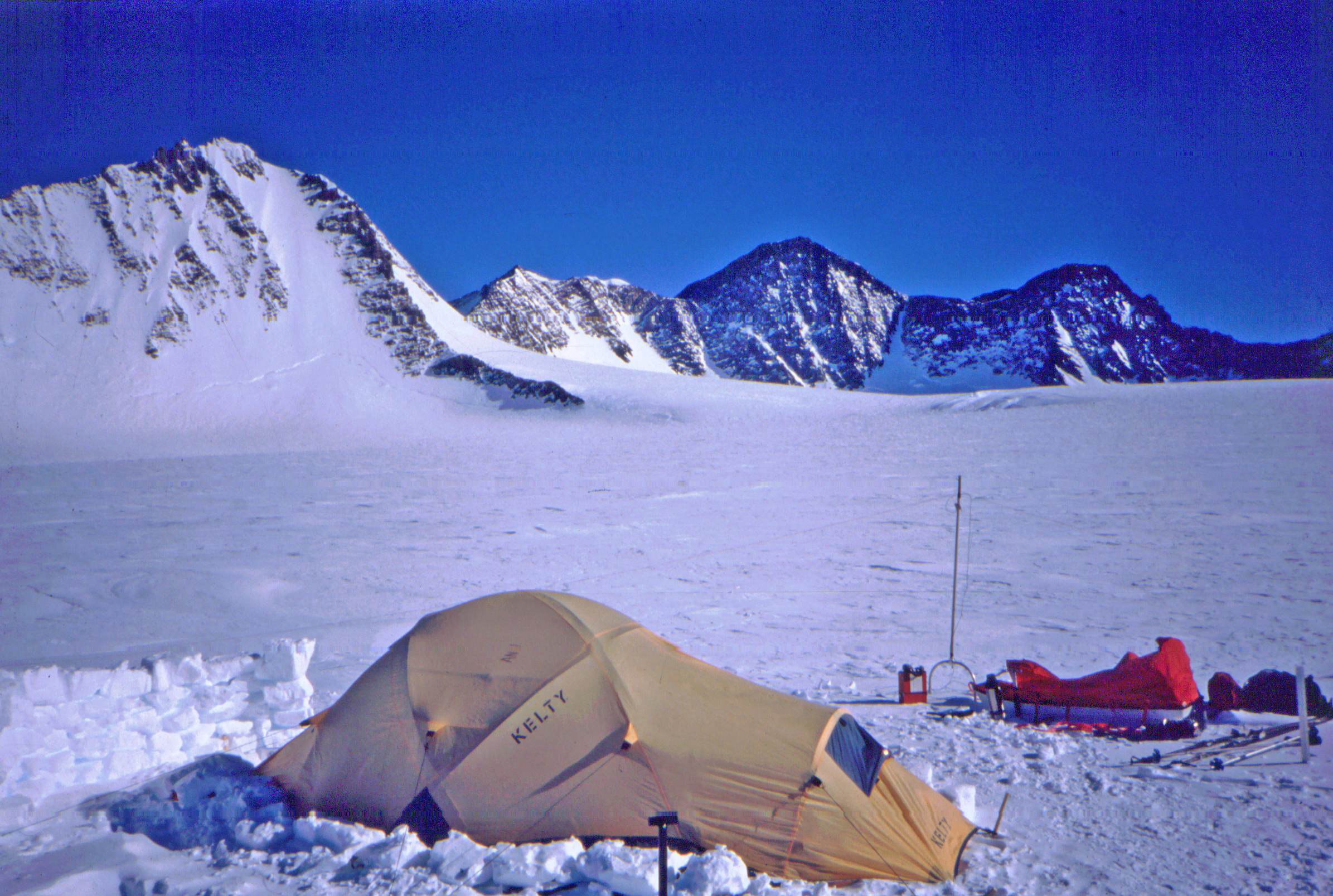

Dimensions
- Length: 160 km (99 mi)
- Width: 48 km (30 mi)

Geography
- Location within Antarctica
- Continent: Antarctica
- Region: Ellsworth Land
- Range coordinates: 79°45′S 83°00′W
- Parent range: Ellsworth Mountains
- Borders on: Sentinel Range

The Heritage Range is a major mountain range, 160 km (99 mi) long and 48 km (30 mi) wide, situated southward of Minnesota Glacier and forming the southern half of the Ellsworth Mountains in Antarctica. The range is complex, consisting of scattered ridges and peaks of moderate height, escarpments, hills and nunataks, with the various units of relief set off by numerous intervening glaciers.

The northern portion of the range was probably first sighted by Lincoln Ellsworth in the course of his trans-Antarctic flight of 23 November 1935. On 14 December 1959, the southern range was seen for the first time in a reconnaissance flight from Byrd Station, made by Edward C. Thiel, J. C. Craddock and E. S. Robinson. The team landed at a glacier on Pipe Peak, in the northwestern part of the range, on 26 December.

During the 1962–63 and 1963–64 seasons, the University of Minnesota expeditions made geologic and cartographic surveys of the range. The entire range was mapped by USGS from aerial photographs taken by the U.S. Navy, 1961–66.

The Heritage range was so named by US-ACAN because topographic units within the range have received names relating to the theme of American heritage.

== Maps ==
- Union Glacier. Scale 1:250 000 topographic map. Reston, Virginia: US Geological Survey, 1966.
- Liberty Hills. Scale 1:250 000 topographic map. Reston, Virginia: US Geological Survey, 1966.
- Antarctic Digital Database (ADD). Scale 1:250000 topographic map of Antarctica. Scientific Committee on Antarctic Research (SCAR). Since 1993, regularly updated.
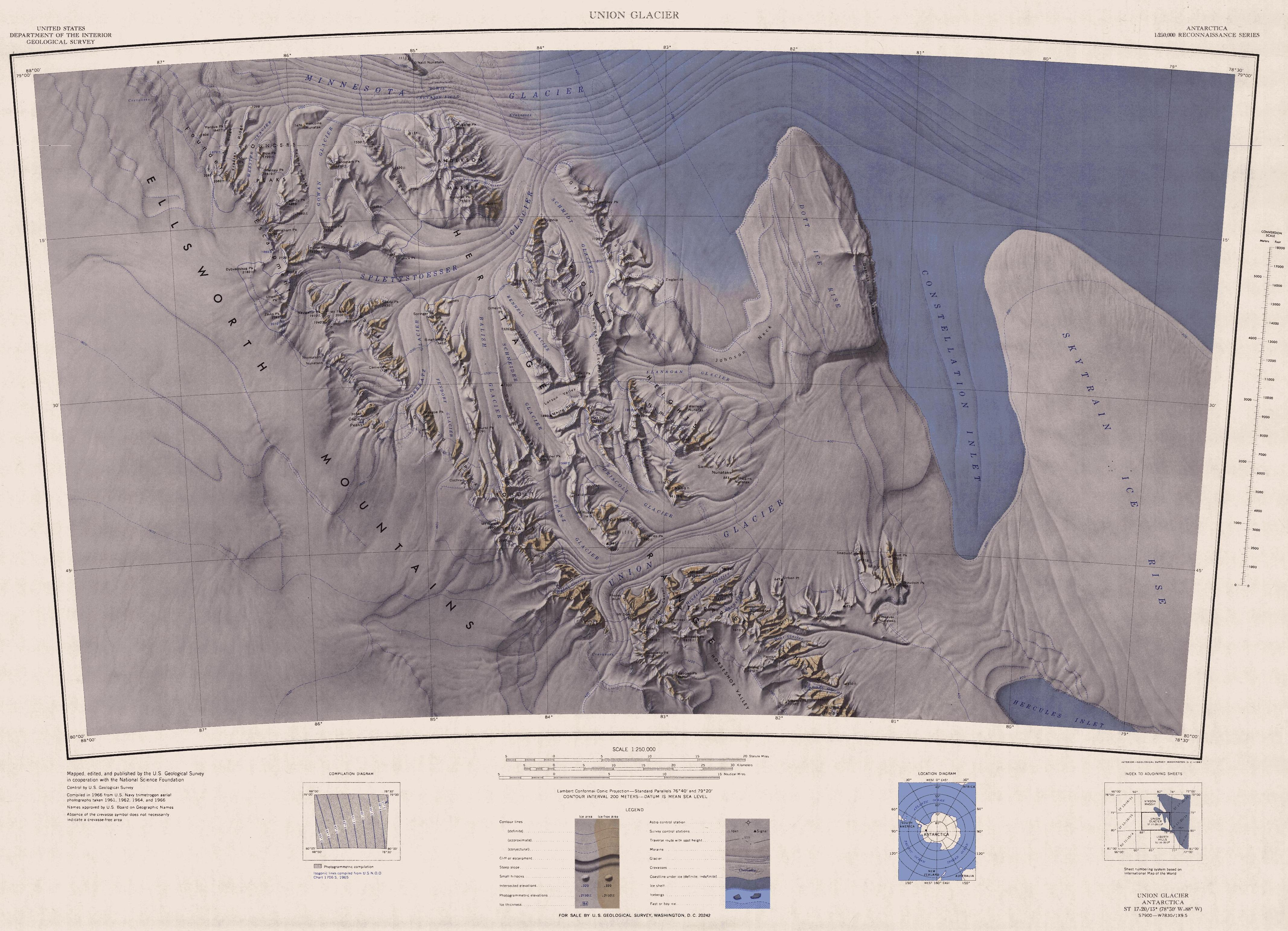
Map of northern Heritage Range

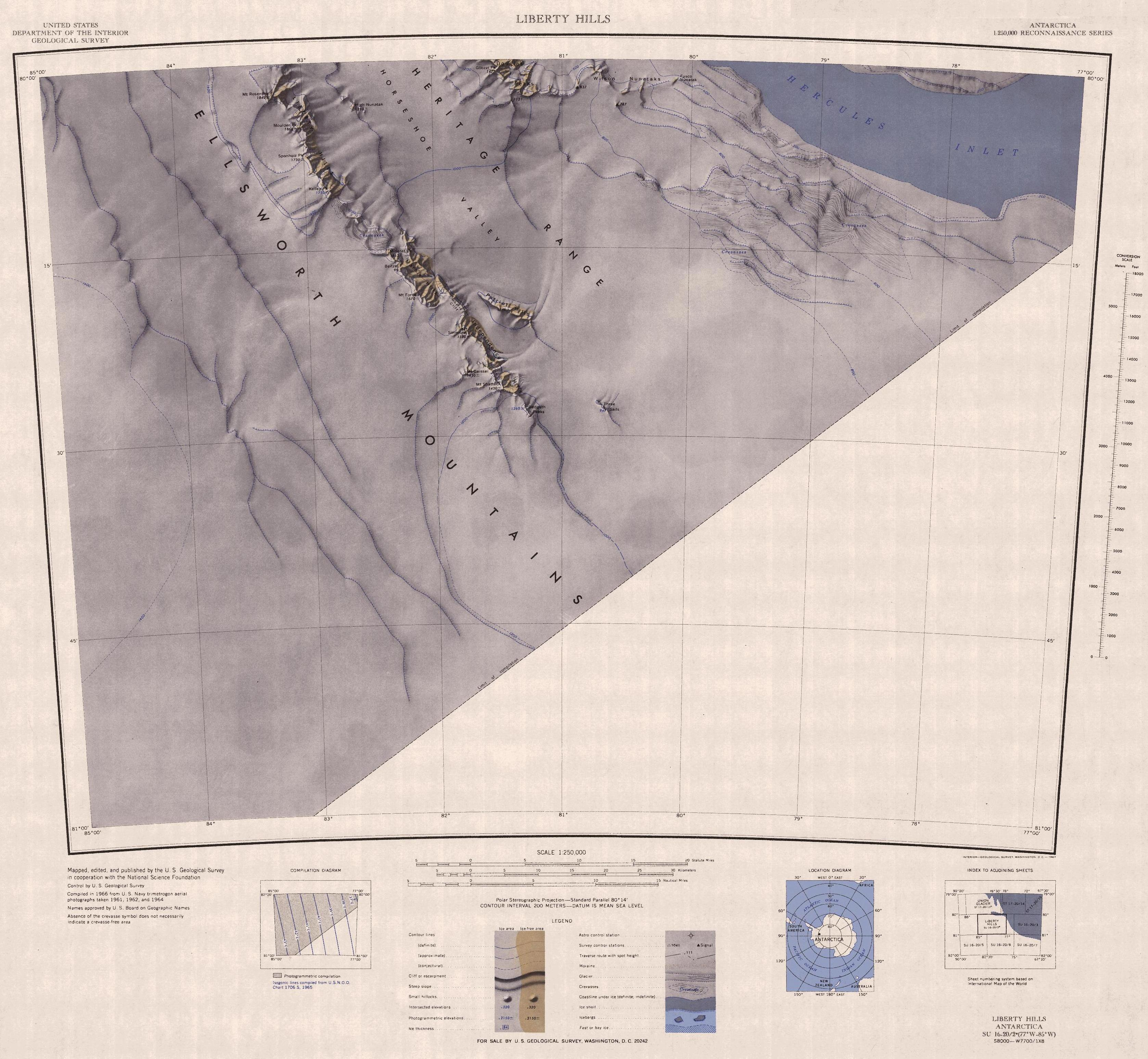
Map of southern Heritage Range

== Features ==
Geographical features include:

=== Anderson Massif ===
- Bowie Crevasse Field
- Grimes Glacier
- Huggler Peak
- Minnesota Glacier
- Rullman Peak
- Siefker Ridge
- Splettstoesser Glacier

=== Douglas Peaks ===
- Gliozzi Peak
- Hudak Peak
- Lippert Peak
- Plummer Glacier

=== Dunbar Ridge ===
- Hessler Peak

=== Edson Hills ===
- Buggisch Peak
- Drake Icefall
- Elvers Peak
- Hyde Glacier
- Kosco Peak
- Lester Peak
- Union Glacier

=== Enterprise Hills ===
- Ahrnsbrak Glacier
- Bell Valley
- Chappell Peak
- Connell Canyon
- Guarcello Peak
- Henderson Glacier
- Horseshoe Valley
- Mount Dolence
- Mount Rossman
- Parrish Peak
- Plummer Glacier
- Rhodes Bluff
- Schoeck Peak
- Seal Glacier
- Shoemaker Peak
- Strong Peak
- Sutton Peak
- Union Glacier
- Urban Point

=== Founders Peaks ===
==== Smith Ridge ====
- Pardue Peak

==== Other Founders Peaks features ====
- Gowan Glacier
- Minnesota Glacier
- Muir Peak
- Pipe Peak
- Reuther Nunataks
- Webster Glacier
- Welcome Nunatak
- Windy Peak

=== Frazier Ridge ===
- Muir Peak
- Webster Glacier

=== Gifford Peaks ===
- Fendorf Glacier
- Cochran Peak
- Lamb Peak
- Maagoe Peak

=== Independence Hills ===
- Marble Hills
- Horseshoe Valley
- Morris Cliff
- Mount Geissel
- Mount Shattuck
- Mount Simmons
- Patriot Hills
- Redpath Peaks

=== Liberty Hills (Antarctica) ===
- Horseshoe Valley
- Kelley Peak
- Moulder Peak
- Mount Rosenthal
- Sponholz Peak

=== Meyer Hills ===
- Beaudoin Peak
- Holt Peak
- Seaquist Peak
- Skytrain Ice Rise

=== Pioneer Heights ===
==== Gross Hills ====
- Courtney Peak
- Flanagan Glacier
- Rosen Peak
- Schmidt Glacier
- Ziegler Point

==== Inferno Ridge ====
- Larson Valley
- Orheim Point
- Rennell Glacier
- Schneider Glacier

==== Nimbus Hills ====
===== Samuel Nunataks =====
- Higgins Nunatak

===== Other Nimbus Hills features =====
- Flanagan Glacier
- Mount Capley
- Warren Nunatak

==== Other Pioneer Heights features ====
- Buchanan Hills
- Collier Hills
- Donald Ridge
- Flanagan Glacier
- Johnson Neck
- Mount Sporli
- Mount Virginia
- Rennell Glacier
- Ronald Ridge
- Schmidt Glacier (Antarctica)
- Thompson Escarpment
- Union Glacier

=== Soholt Peaks ===
- Balish Glacier
- Conglomerate Ridge
- Eley Peak
- Mount Bursik
- Mount Macalester
- Schanz Glacier
- Yochelson Ridge

=== Watlack Hills ===
- Carnell Peak
- Dobbratz Glacier
- Mount Twiss
- Skelly Peak

=== Webers Peaks ===
- Dobbratz Glacier
- Hurst Peak
- Pojeta Peak
- Springer Peak

=== Other features ===
- Barrett Nunataks
- Bingham Peak
- Cagle Peaks
- Carnell Peak
- Charles Peak
- Cunningham Peak
- Dott Ice Rise
- Driscoll Glacier
- Dybvadskog Peak
- Founders Escarpment
- Fusco Nunatak
- Gould Spur
- Gowan Glacier
- Hall Peak
- Hercules Inlet
- Herrin Peak
- High Nunatak
- Hoinkes Peak
- Hutto Peak
- Landmark Peak
- Linder Peak
- Matney Peak
- Mhire Spur
- Minnesota Glacier
- Mount Bursik
- Mount Johns
- Mount Rodger
- Mount Twiss
- Mount Woollard
- Navigator Peak
- Planck Point
- Robinson Peak
- Rutford Ice Stream
- Schneider Glacier
- Thompson Nunataks
- Three Sails
- Unger Peak
- Weaver Nunataks
- White Escarpment
- Wilson Nunataks
- Zavis Peak
