= High Nunatak =

Antarctic geological feature

High Nunatak (80°3′S 82°35′W) is an isolated nunatak 4 nautical miles (7 km) east of the Liberty Hills in the Heritage Range of the Ellsworth Mountains, Antarctica. It was named by the Advisory Committee on Antarctic Names for Elmer High, a helicopter crew chief with the 62nd Transportation Detachment, who assisted the University of Minnesota geological party in this area in 1963–64.
