= Linder Peak =

Mountain in Antarctica

Linder Peak (79°52′S 83°12′W) is a somewhat lower, but very imposing peak standing immediately south of Mount Dolence in the Heritage Range, Ellsworth Mountains, Antarctica. It was mapped by the United States Geological Survey from surveys and U.S. Navy air photos from 1961 to 1966, and was named by the Advisory Committee on Antarctic Names for Harold W. Linder, a geophysicist with the United States Antarctic Research Program Ross Ice Shelf party of 1961–62.

== See also ==
- Mountains in Antarctica
