= Buchanan Hills =

The Buchanan Hills (79°39′S 82°55′W) are a cluster of rugged hills standing north of Union Glacier and between the Collier Hills and the Nimbus Hills, in the Heritage Range. They were named by the Advisory Committee on Antarctic Names for Roger Buchanan, United States Antarctic Research Program biologist in Antarctica in the 1964–65 season.
