= Minnesota Glacier =

Glacier in Antarctica

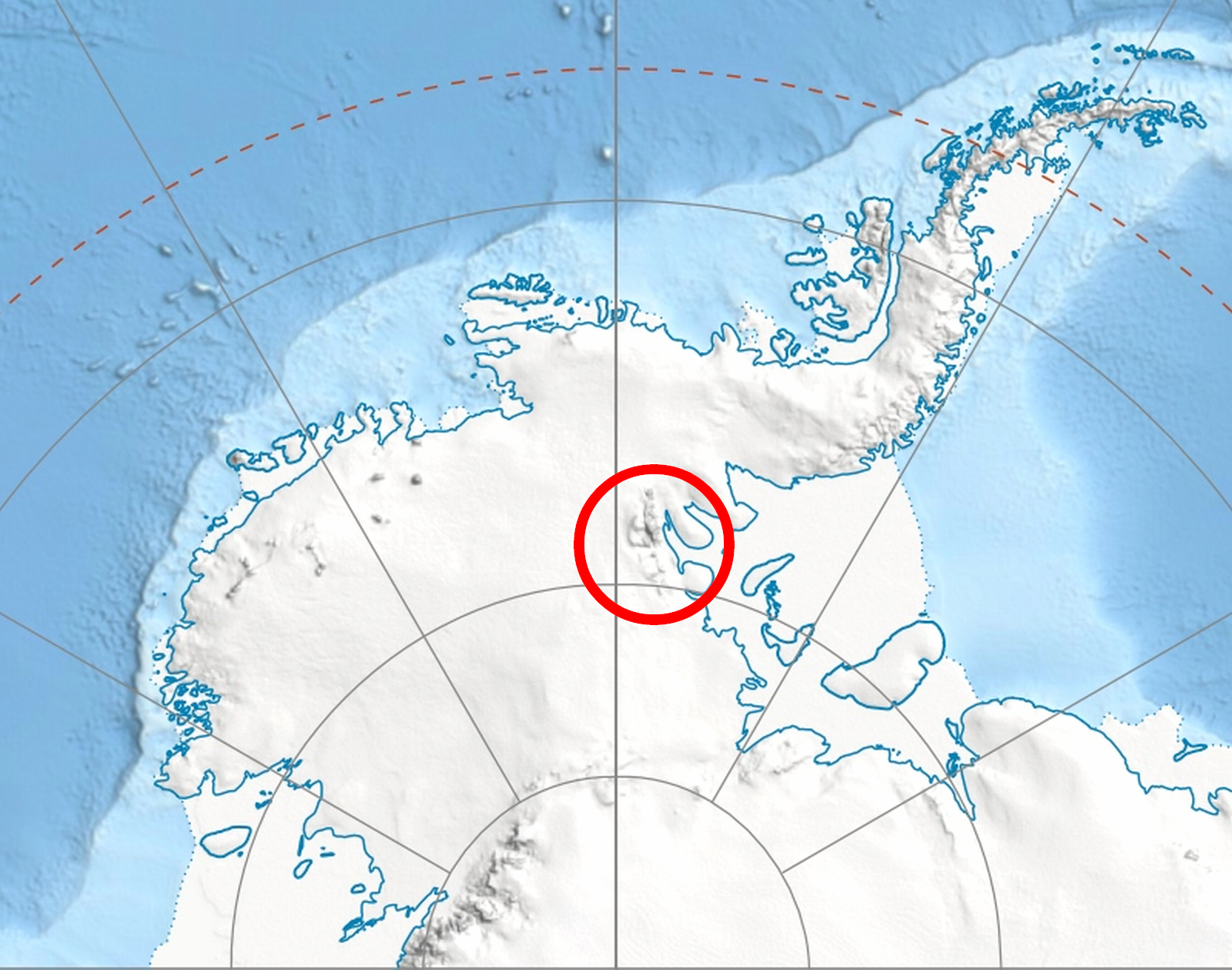
- Location of Ellsworth Mountains in Western Antarctica

- Location within Antarctica
- Location: Ellsworth Land
- Coordinates: 79°00′00″S 83°00′00″W
- Length: 40 nautical miles (74 km; 46 mi)
- Width: 5 nautical miles (9.3 km; 5.8 mi)
- Thickness: unknown
- Terminus: Rutford Ice Stream
- Status: unknown

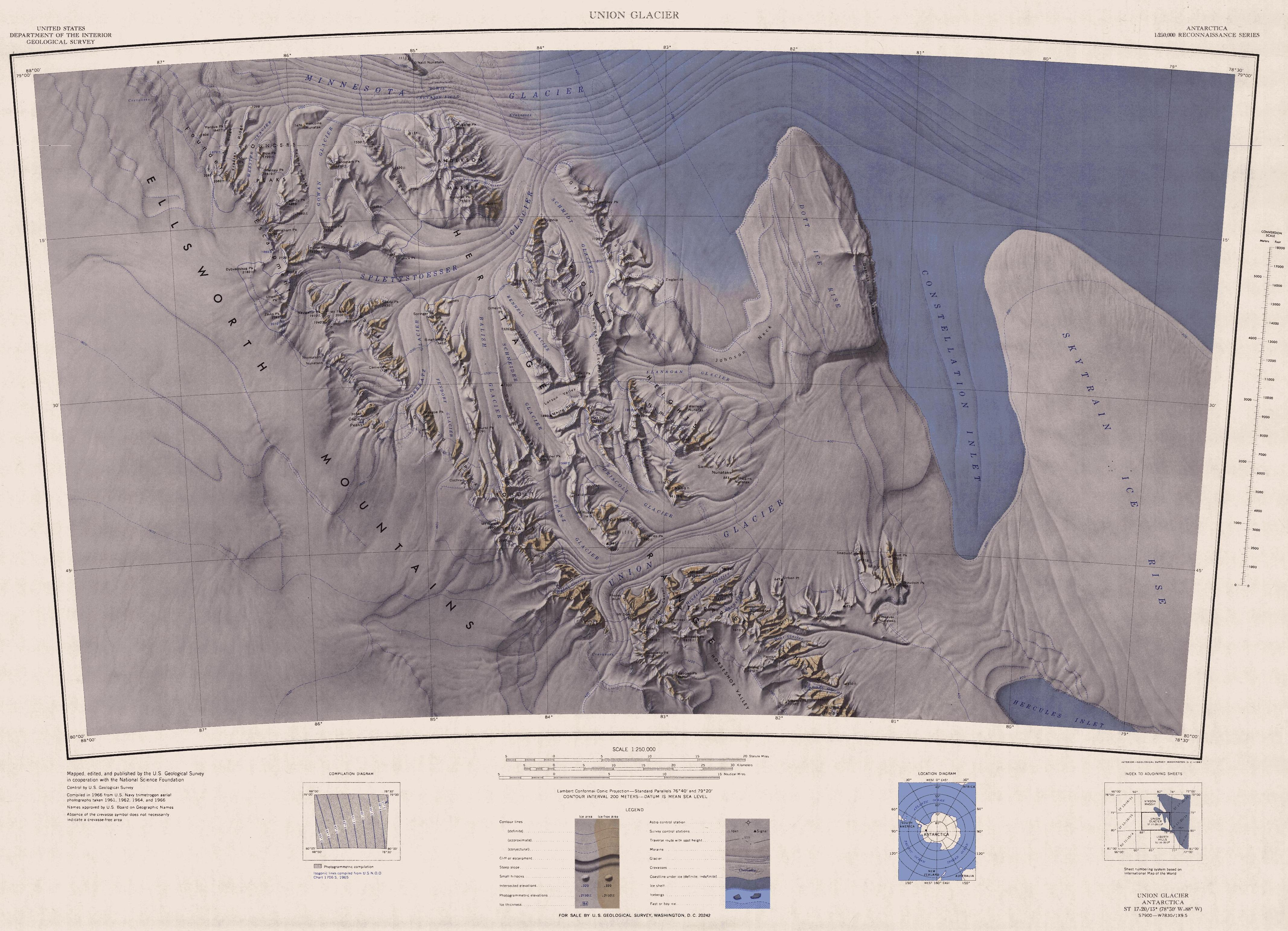
Map of Heritage Range and Minnesota Glacier.

Map of Sentinel Range with upper Minnesota Glacier and its northern tributaries.

Minnesota Glacier (79°0′S 83°0′W) is a broad glacier, about 40 nautical miles (74 km; 46 mi) long and 5 nautical miles (9.3 km; 5.8 mi) wide, flowing east through the Ellsworth Mountains in Antarctica, separating the Sentinel Range and the Heritage Range. It is nourished by ice from the plateau west of the mountains and by Nimitz Glacier and Splettstoesser Glacier, and merges into the larger Rutford Ice Stream at the eastern margin of the Ellsworth Mountains.

== History ==
The glacier was named by the Advisory Committee on Antarctic Names for the University of Minnesota, Twin Cities, which sent research parties to the Ellsworth Mountains in 1961–62, 1962–63 and 1963–64.

== Tributary glaciers ==
- Splettstoesser Glacier
- Gowan Glacier
- Webster Glacier
- Nimitz Glacier
- Wessbecher Glacier
- Hudman Glacier
- Carey Glacier

== See also ==
- List of glaciers in the Antarctic
- Glaciology
