= Springer Peak =

Mountain in Antarctica

Springer Peak (79°24′S 84°53′W) is a rock peak (1,460 m) surmounting the north extremity of Webers Peaks in the Heritage Range, Ellsworth Mountains. It was mapped by the United States Geological Survey (USGS) from ground surveys and U.S. Navy air photos from 1961 to 1966. It was named by the Advisory Committee on Antarctic Names (US-ACAN) for Michael J. Springer, a photographer on U.S. Navy flights over Marie Byrd Land and Ellsworth Land in the 1965–66 season.
