= White Escarpment =

Escarpment in Antarctica

Coordinates: 79°29′S 85°37′W

Location of White Escarpment, Ellsworth Land, Antarctica

White Escarpment is an escarpment in the west part of the Heritage Range, Antarctica, extending for 15 nautical miles (28 km) between the heads of the Splettstoesser and Dobbratz Glaciers. Named by the University of Minnesota Geological Party to these mountains, 1963–64, for Chief Warrant Officer Ronald B. White, pilot with the 62nd Transportation Detachment, who assisted the party.
