= Gowan Glacier =

Glacier in Antarctica

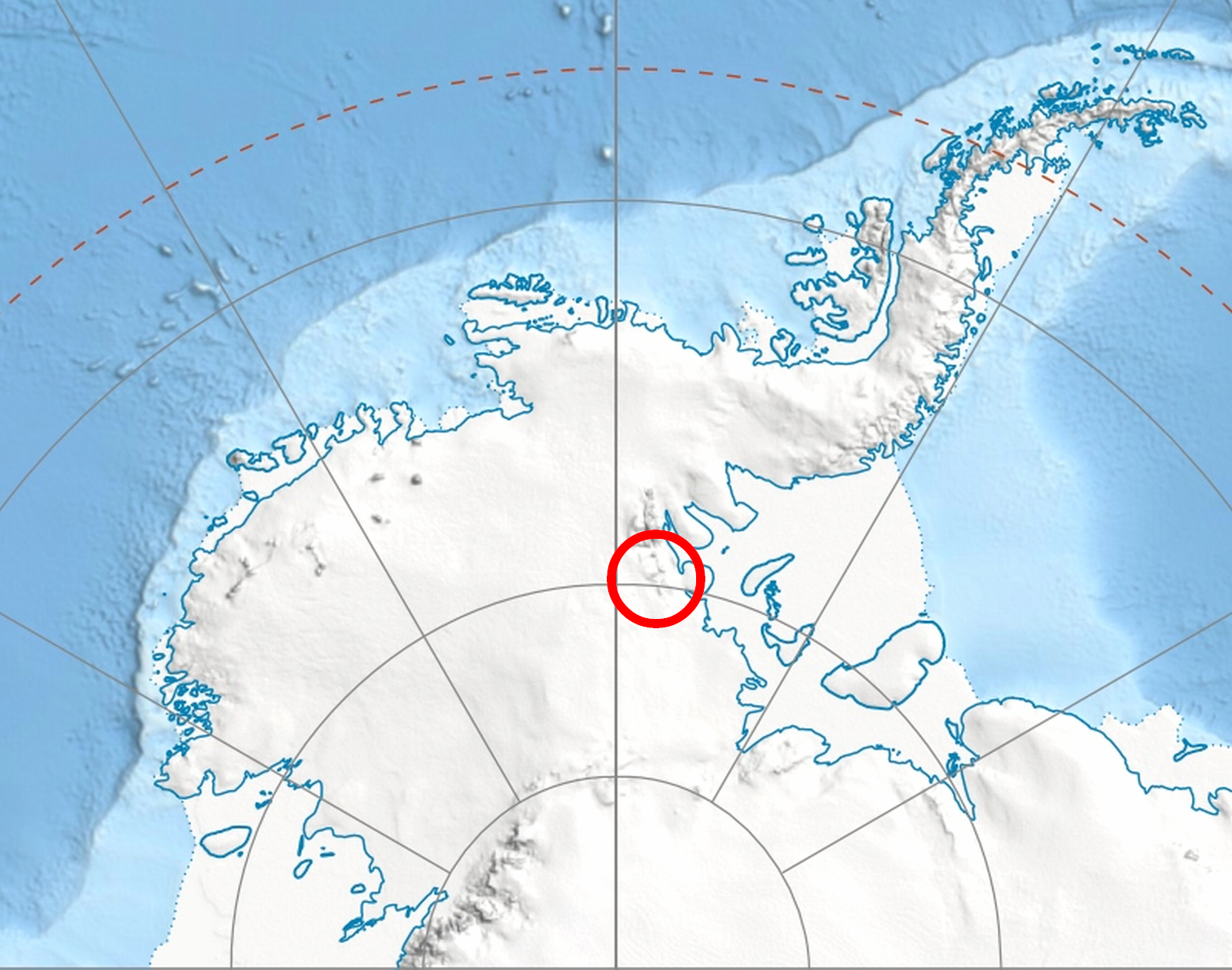
- Location of Heritage Range in Western Antarctica

- Location within Antarctica
- Location: Ellsworth Land
- Coordinates: 79°07′00″S 85°39′00″W
- Length: 15 nautical miles (28 km; 17 mi)
- Thickness: unknown
- Terminus: Minnesota Glacier
- Status: unknown

Gowan Glacier is a glacier about 15 nautical miles (28 km; 17 mi) long in the Heritage Range of the Ellsworth Mountains of Antarctica, flowing north from the vicinity of Cunningham Peak in the Founders Escarpment to enter Minnesota Glacier just east of Welcome Nunatak. It was mapped by the United States Geological Survey from surveys and U.S. Navy air photos, 1961–66, and was named by the Advisory Committee on Antarctic Names for Lieutenant Jimmy L. Gowan, U.S. Navy Medical Corps, officer in charge and doctor at Plateau Station in 1966.

== See also ==
- List of glaciers in the Antarctic
- Glaciology
