= Splettstoesser Glacier =

Glacier in Ellsworth Land, Antarctica

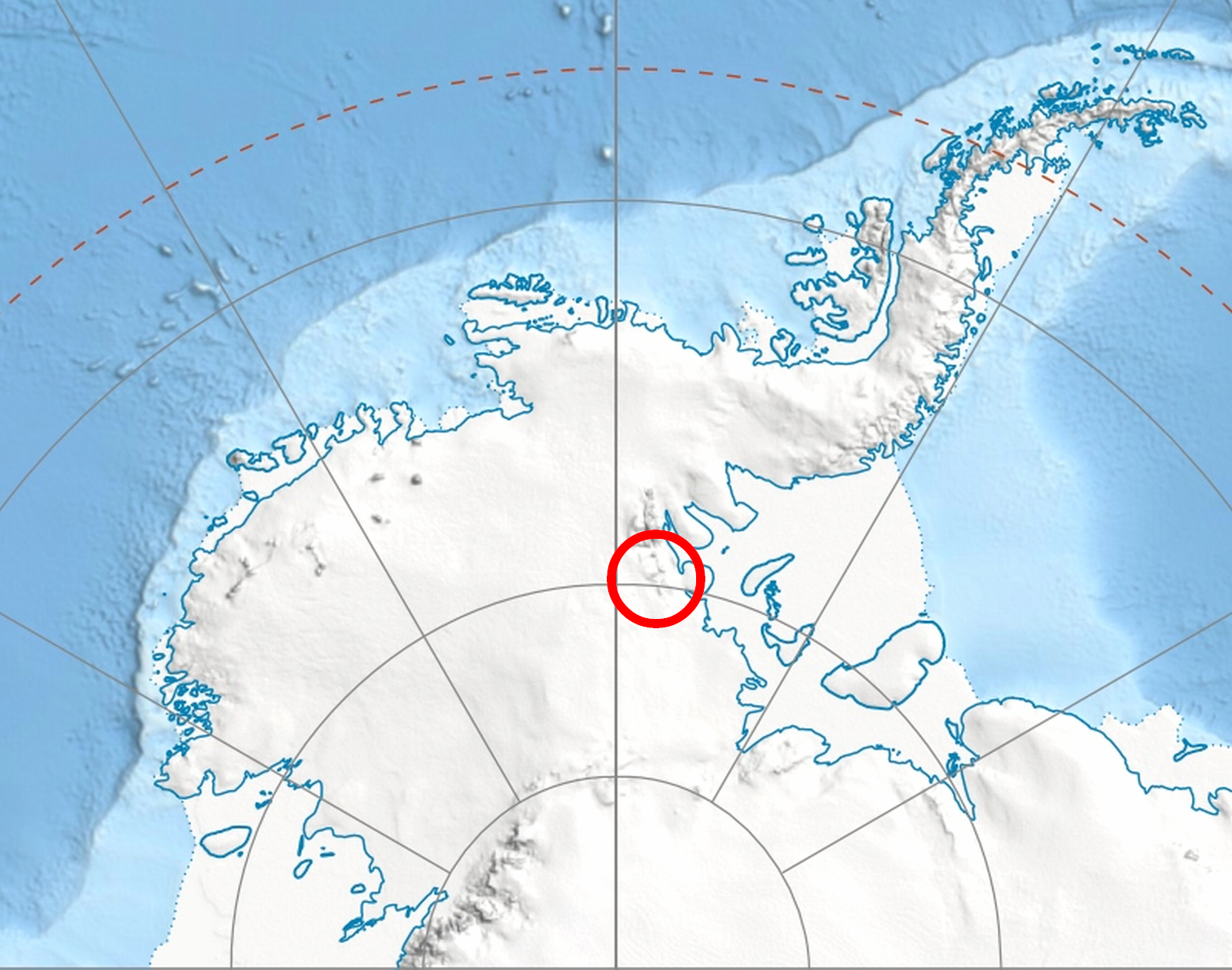
- Location of Heritage Range in Western Antarctica

- Location within Antarctica
- Type: tributary
- Location: Ellsworth Land
- Coordinates: 79°12′00″S 84°09′00″W
- Length: 35 nautical miles (65 km; 40 mi)
- Thickness: unknown
- Terminus: Minnesota Glacier
- Status: unknown

Splettstoesser Glacier (79°12′S 84°9′W) is a glacier, 35 nautical miles (65 km; 40 mi) long, draining from the plateau just south of Founders Escarpment and flowing east-northeast through the Heritage Range to the south of Founders Peaks and Anderson Massif to enter the Minnesota Glacier. Named by the University of Minnesota Ellsworth Mountains Party which explored the area in 1961-62 for John F. Splettstoesser, geologist with that party.

== See also ==
- List of glaciers in the Antarctic
- Glaciology

== Maps ==
- Union Glacier. Scale 1:250 000 topographic map. Reston, Virginia: US Geological Survey, 1966.
- Antarctic Digital Database (ADD). Scale 1:250000 topographic map of Antarctica. Scientific Committee on Antarctic Research (SCAR). Since 1993, regularly updated.
