= Founders Escarpment =

Coordinates: 79°15′S 86°15′W

Founders Escarpment is a prominent escarpment located west of the Founders Peaks in the Heritage Range of Antarctica, extending from Minnesota Glacier to Splettstoesser Glacier. It was named after the nearby Founders Peaks by the University of Minnesota Geological Party, 1963–64.
