= List of ultras of Antarctica =

List of high mountains in Antarctica

This is a list of all the ultra prominent peaks (with topographic prominence greater than 1,500 metres) in Antarctica. Some islands in the South Atlantic have also been included and can be found at the end of the list.

== Antarctica ==
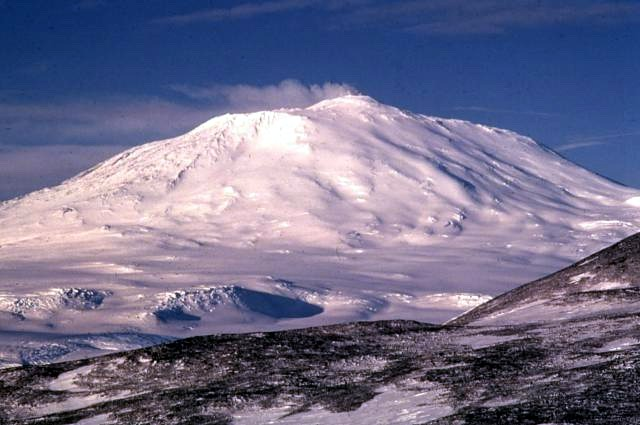
Mount Erebus, Ross Island

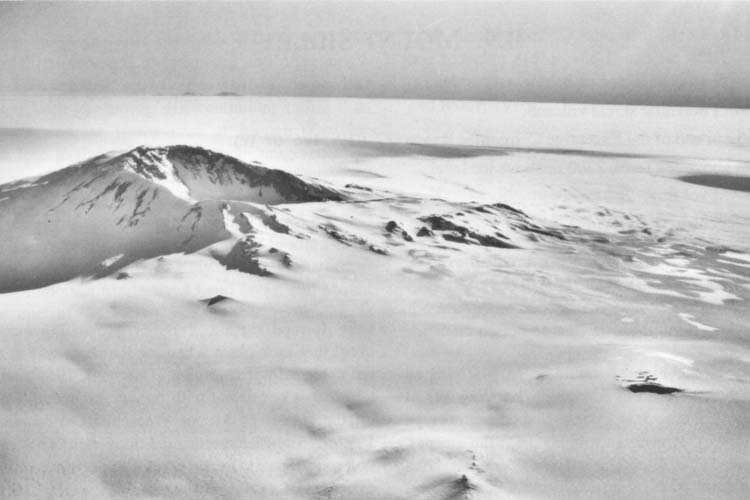
Mount Sidley, Marie Byrd Land

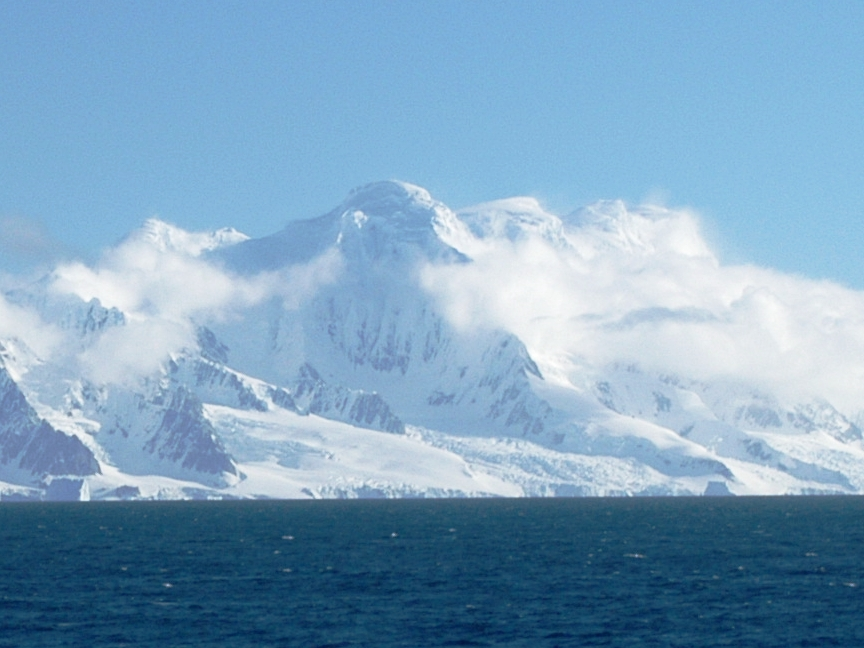
Mount Foster, Smith Island

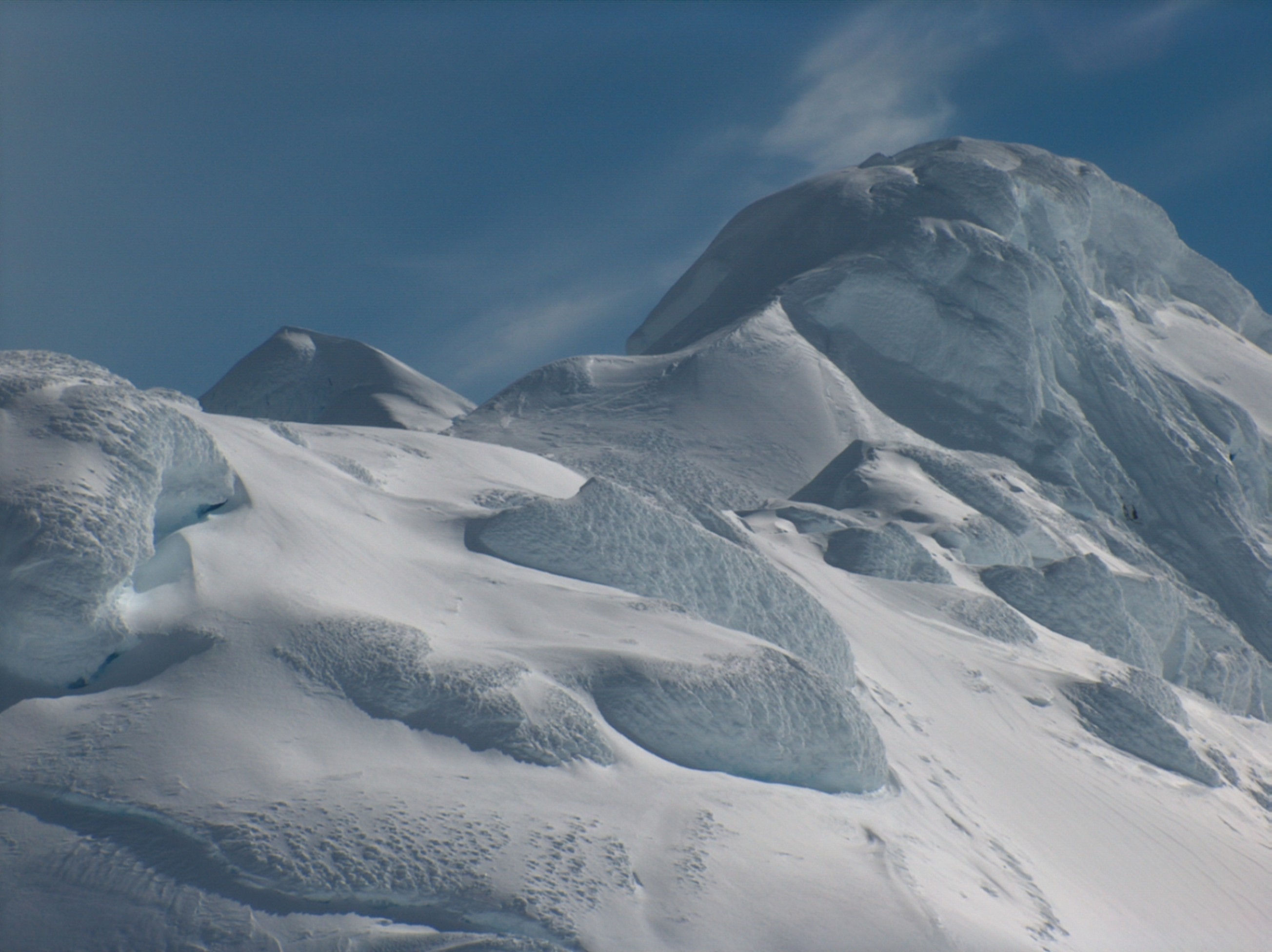
Mount Friesland, Livingston Island

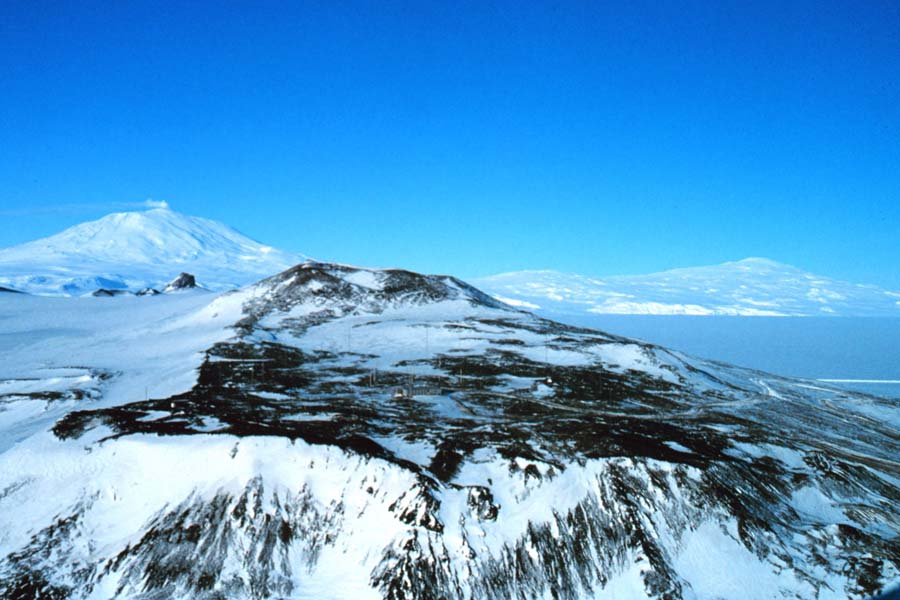
A view of both Mount Erebus (left) and Mount Terror (right), Ross Island

No	Peak	Country	Elevation (m)	Prominence (m)	Col (m)
1	Vinson Massif	Antarctica	4,892	4,892	0
2	Mount Erebus	Antarctica (Ross Island)	3,794	3,794	0
3	Mount Siple	Antarctica (Siple Island)	3,110	3,110	0
4	Mount Stephenson	Antarctica (Alexander Island)	2,987	2,987	0
5	Mount Français	Antarctica (Anvers Island)	2,760	2,760	0
6	Mount Minto	Antarctica	4,165	2,616	1549
7	Mount Kirkpatrick	Antarctica	4,528	2,601	1927
8	Mount Parry	Antarctica (Brabant Island)	2,520	2,520	0
9	Mount Sidley	Antarctica	4,285	2,517	1768
10	Mount Miller	Antarctica	4,160	2,354	1806
11	Mount Lister	Antarctica	4,025	2,325	1700
12	Mount Gaudry	Antarctica (Adelaide Island)	2,315	2,315	0
13	Mount Hope	Antarctica	3,239	2,242	997
14	Mount Takahe	Antarctica	3,460	2,134	1316
15	Mount Foster	Antarctica (Smith Island)	2,105	2,105	0
16	Mount Markham	Antarctica	4,350	2,103	2247
17	Mount Paris	Antarctica (Alexander Island)	2,896	2,058	838
18	Mount Murphy	Antarctica	2,705	2,055	650
19	Hawkes Heights	Antarctica (Coulman Island)	2,000	2,000	0
20	Mount Irving	Antarctica (Clarence Island)	1,950	1,950	0
21	Toney Mountain	Antarctica	3,595	1,946	1649
22	Mount Unnamed	Antarctica (Alexander Island)	2,486	1,939	547
23	Mount Murchison	Antarctica	3,501	1,927	1574
24	Mount Supernal	Antarctica	3,655	1,804	1851
25	Mount Kaplan	Antarctica	4,230	1,783	2447
26	Mount Frakes	Antarctica	3,675	1,780	1895
27	Mount Friesland	Antarctica (Livingston Island)	1,700	1,700	0
28	Mount Melbourne	Antarctica	2,730	1,699	1031
29	Mount Terror	Antarctica (Ross Island)	3,230	1,696	1534
30	Mount Elizabeth	Antarctica	4,480	1,657	2823
31	Lars Christensen Peak	Antarctica (Peter I Island)	1,640	1,640	0
32	Dome A	Antarctica	4,091	1,639	2452
33	Mount Discovery	Antarctica	2,680	1,637	1043
34	Mount Verne	Antarctica (Pourquoi Pas Island)	1,632	1,632	0
35	Mount Haddington	Antarctica (James Ross Island)	1,630	1,630	0
36	Mount McClintock	Antarctica	3,490	1,621	1869
37	Mount Brewster	Antarctica	2,025	1,598	427
38	Brown Peak	Antarctica (Sturge Island)	1,524	1,524	0
39	Mount Morning	Antarctica	2,725	1,515	1210
40	Mount Anderson	Antarctica	4,254	1,504	2750

== South Atlantic ==
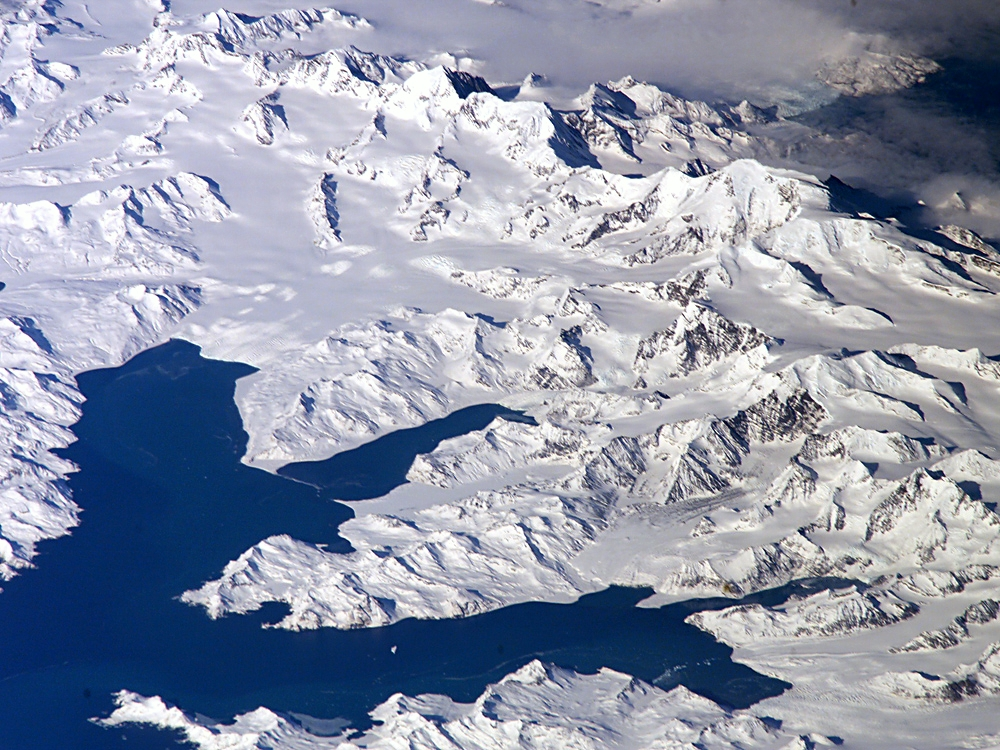
Mount Paget, South Georgia

No	Peak	Country	Elevation (m)	Prominence (m)	Col (m)
1	Mount Paget	South Georgia and the South Sandwich Islands	2,934	2,934	0
2	Queen Mary's Peak	Saint Helena, Ascension and Tristan da Cunha (Tristan da Cunha)	2,062	2,062	0
3	Mount Carse	South Georgia and the South Sandwich Islands	2,330	1,720	610

== Sources ==
- "Antarctica Ultra-Prominences", peaklist.org, Aaron Maizlish
- "Australia, New Zealand, Oceania Ultra-Prominence Page", peaklist.org, Aaron Maizlish
