= Patriot Hills Base Camp =

Patriot Hills Camp
- Antarctic Camp
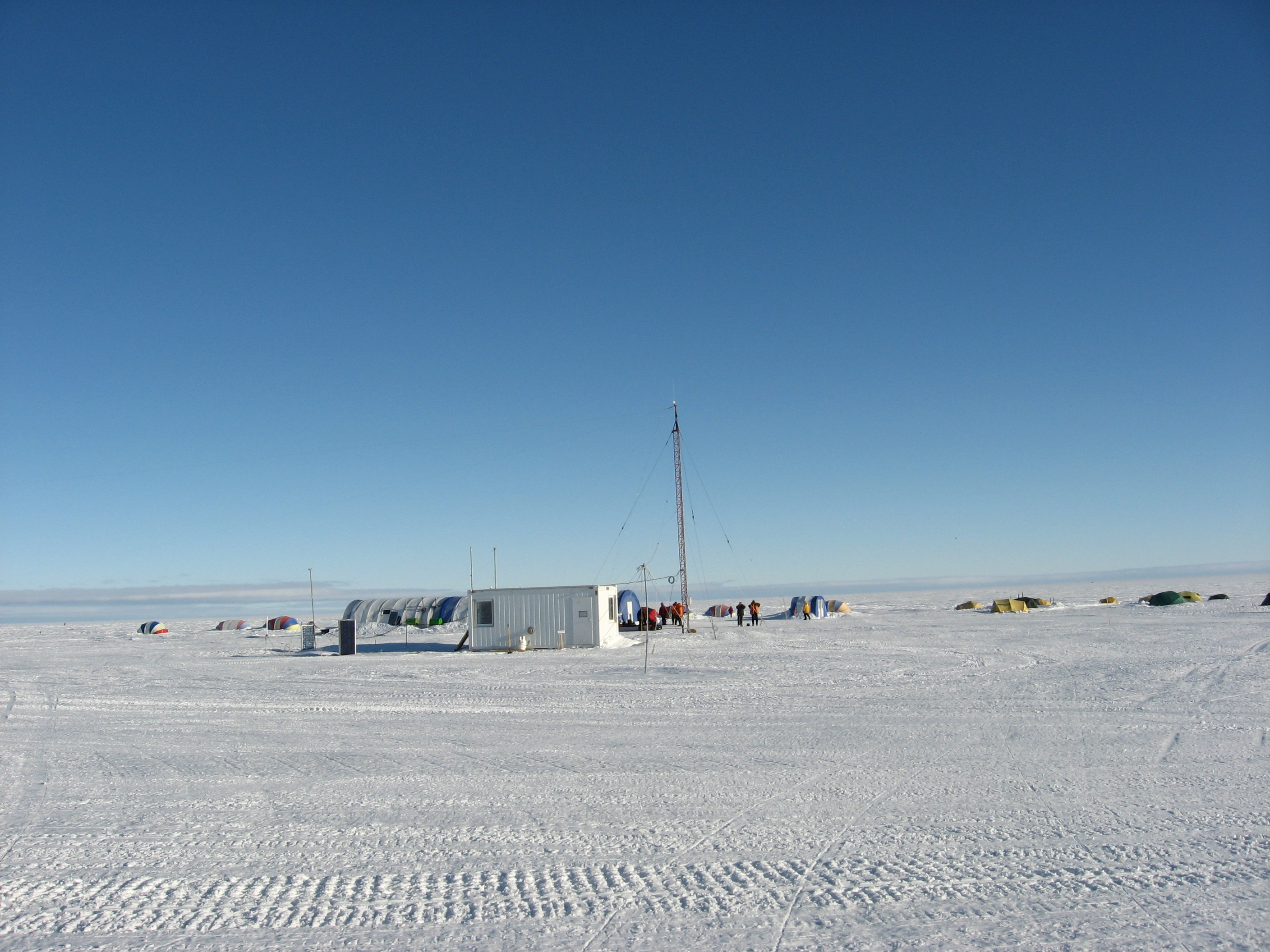
- Patriot Hills Base Camp

- Location of Patriot Hills Base Camp in Antarctica
- Coordinates: 80°18′00″S 81°20′39″W
- Country: United States
- Location in Antarctica: Heritage Range; Ellsworth Mountains; Antarctica
- Administered by: Antarctic Logistics & Expeditions LLC
- Established: 1987
- Type: Seasonal
- Period: Summer
- Status: Operational

Patriot Hills Base Camp was a private seasonally occupied camp in Antarctica. It was located in the Heritage Range of the Ellsworth Mountains, next to the Patriot Hills that gave it its name.

The camp was run by the private company Adventure Network International (now Antarctic Logistics & Expeditions LLC, known as ALE), a company that provides expedition support and tours to the interior of Antarctica. It was constructed in 1987 and used during the summer months of November to January. Patriot Hills was for many adventurers and explorers a stop on the way from Chile's Punta Arenas into the interior of Antarctica. The flight time from Punta Arenas is about 4.5 hours.

As of November 2010 ALE has moved operations. Union Glacier Camp is the new base of operations and Union Glacier Blue-Ice Runway SCGC is the new runway, 70 kilometers from Patriot Hills. Patriot Hills is being retained as a backup runway.

In the summer months the temperature rises to −15 °C. The temperature in the winter months is estimated to be about −40 °C, but no one has yet overwintered in the Ellsworth Mountains.

== History ==
In the Antarctic spring of 1988 Patriot Hills was the staging point for the first expedition from Hercules Inlet to the South Pole, led by Martyn S. Williams. This 50-day expedition opened up the doorway for South Pole overland journeys, and has become the classic route for most expeditions. In 1989 Patriot Hills was the staging point of the continental crossing by Reinhold Messner and Arved Fuchs that started at 82°S-72°W, crossed the South Pole to McMurdo Station. It has also been the starting point for many expeditions to Mount Vinson, some 120 kilometers away.

In 1991, Patriot Hills was featured in episode eight of the BBC travel series Pole to Pole with Michael Palin.

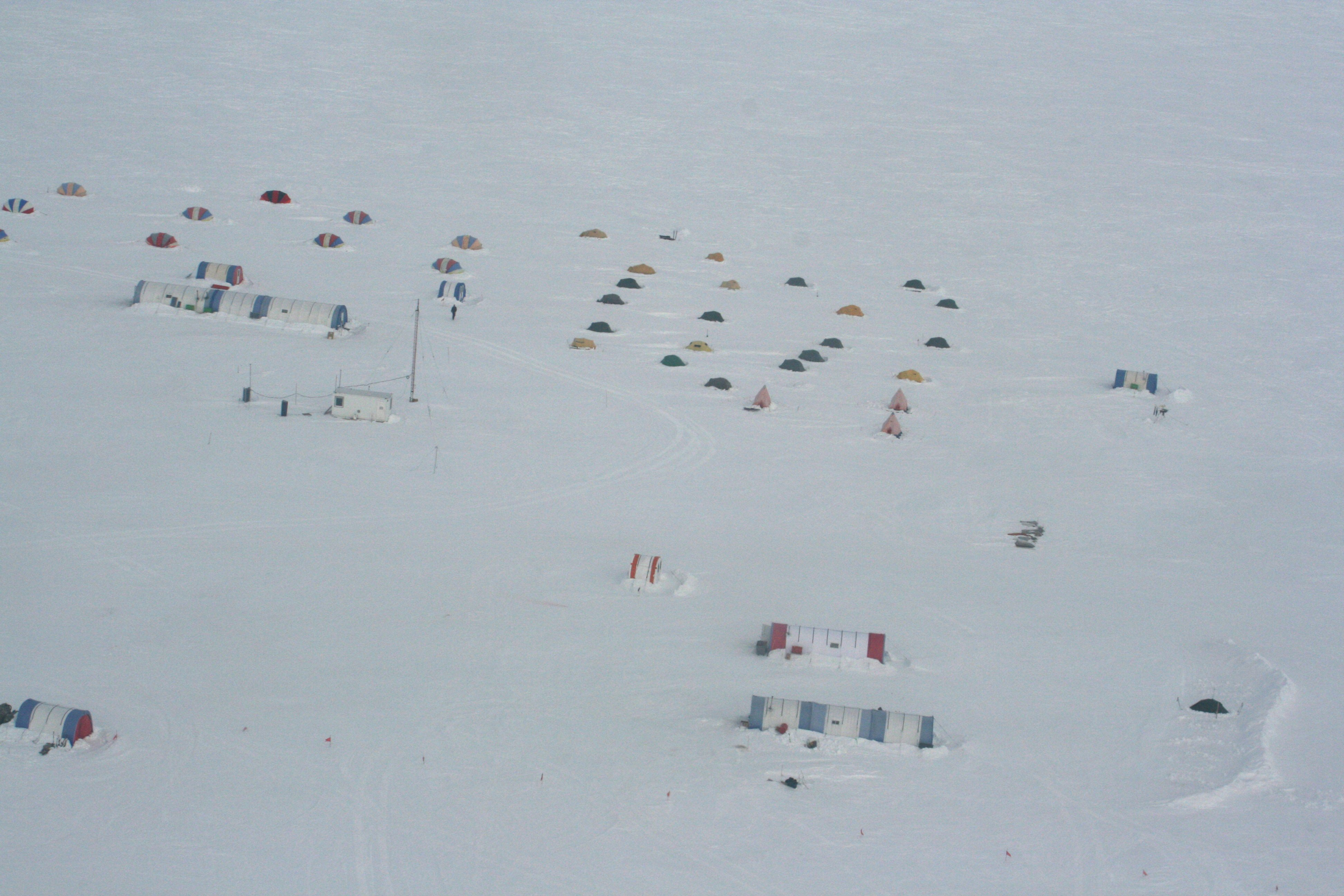
Aerial view of base camp tents

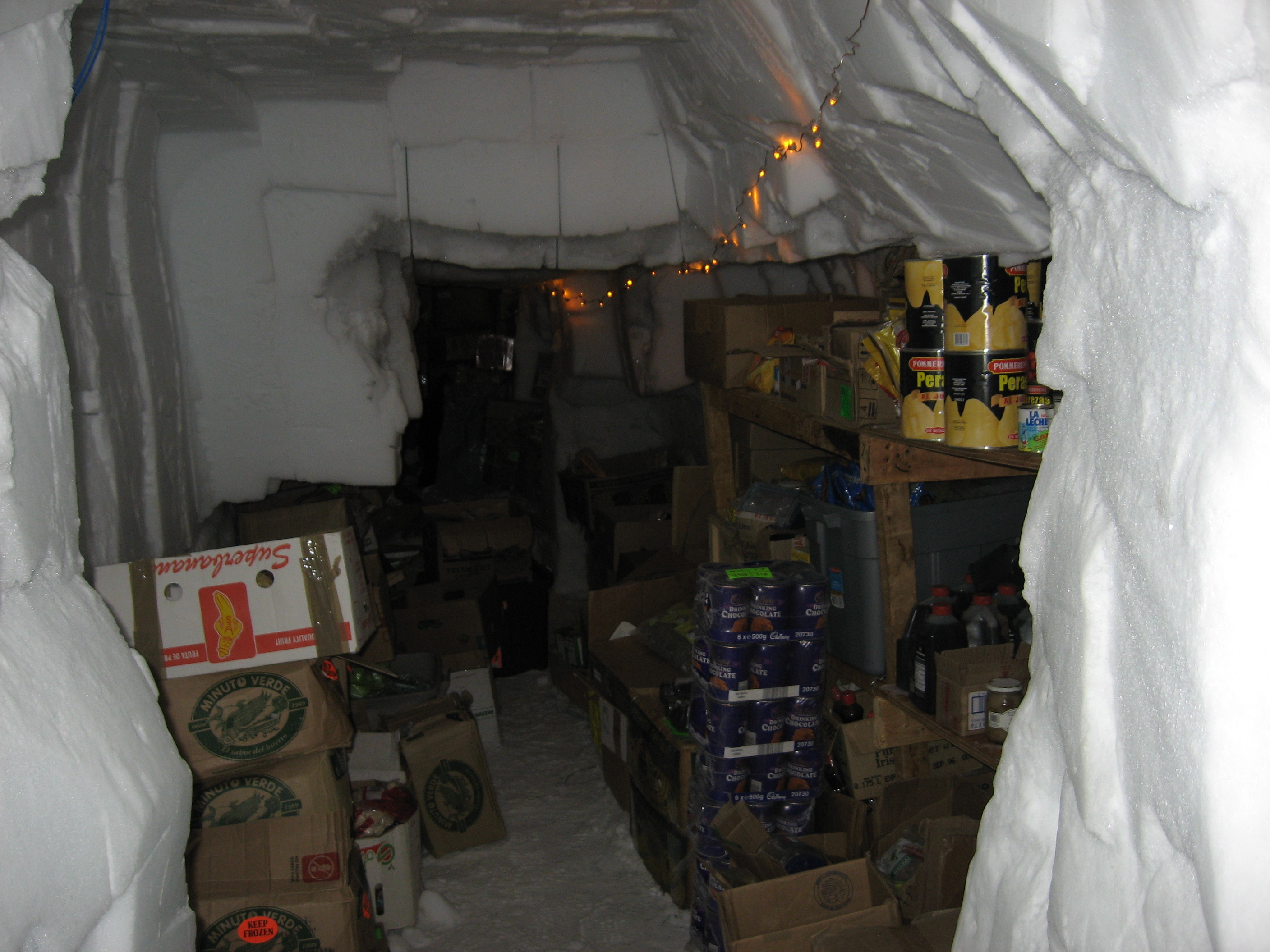
Storage tunnels beneath the camp

== Patriot Hills Blue-Ice Runway ==
Patriot Hill Blue-Ice Runway
- IATA: none; ICAO: SCPZ

Summary
- Airport type: Blue-ice runway
- Operator: Antarctic Logistics and Expeditions LLC
- Serves: Patriot Hills
- Location: Heritage Range; Ellsworth Mountains; Antarctica
- Elevation AMSL: 2,900 ft (880 m)
- Coordinates: 80°18′53″S 81°22′29″W

Map
- Location of airfield in Antarctica

Runways
Direction	Length		Surface
Direction	ft	m	Surface
24M	3,281 × 164	1,000 × 50	Ice

The camp was built near one of the rare blue ice fields. A blue ice runway was used as the takeoff and landing strip for large intercontinental aircraft including DC6, L-382, C130 and Ilyushin Il-76.

The heart of the camp was the communal tent that serves as a common lounge and dining room. In the communications tent, using devices powered by solar power, high-frequency radio equipment maintained contact with Punta Arenas and the traveling expeditions. The residents of the camp were housed in two-person tents.

== See also ==
- Blue-ice area
- List of Antarctic field camps
- List of airports in Antarctica
