= Wilson Nunataks =

Wilson Nunataks (80°1′S 80°38′W) is an irregular string of nunataks about 8 nautical miles (15 km) long, lying between the Douglas Peaks and the head of Hercules Inlet in the Heritage Range, Ellsworth Mountains. Named by the University of Minnesota Geological Party to these mountains, 1963–64, for Chief Warrant Officer Kenneth Wilson, pilot with the 62nd Transportation Detachment which assisted the party.

These nunataks (mountain peaks sticking above the ice surface) are visible from the Hercules Inlet, a common starting point for long-distance expeditions trekking 1170 km from the coast of Antarctica to the South Pole.

== Features ==
Geographical features include:

- Fusco Nunatak
