= Patriot Hills =

Line of hills in Antarctica

Coordinates: 80°20′S 81°25′W

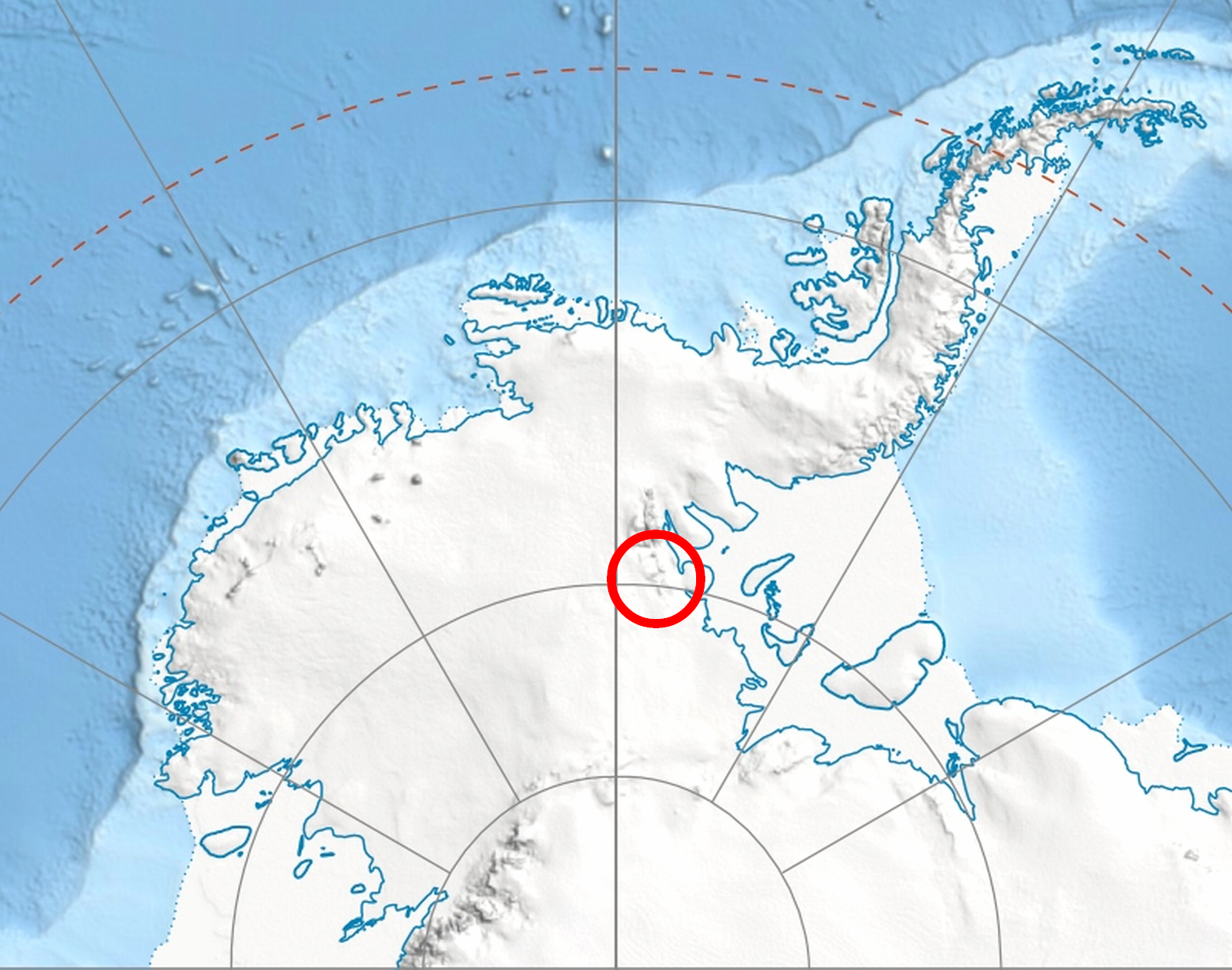
Location of Patriot Hills in Western Antarctica.

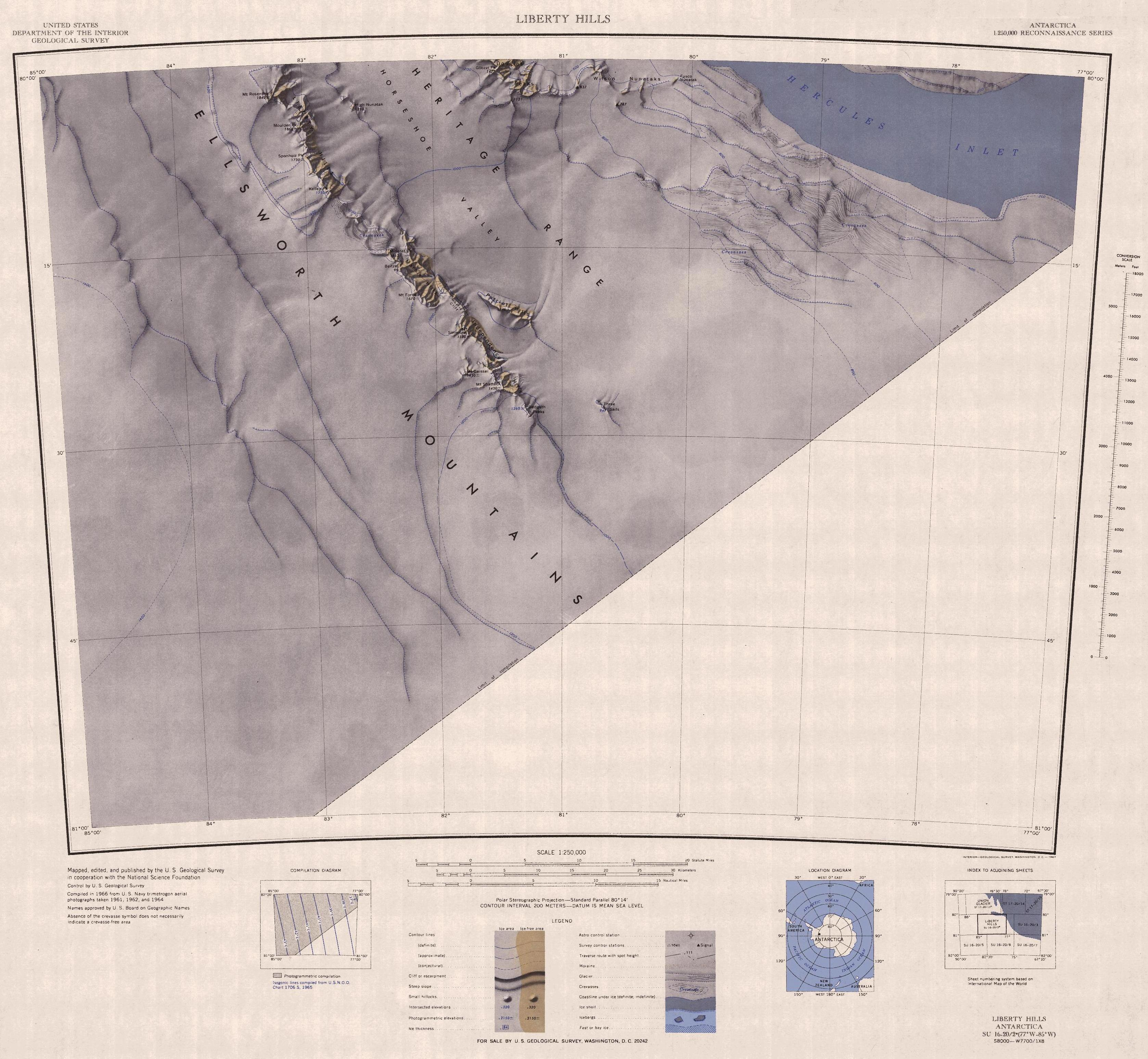
Map of the region

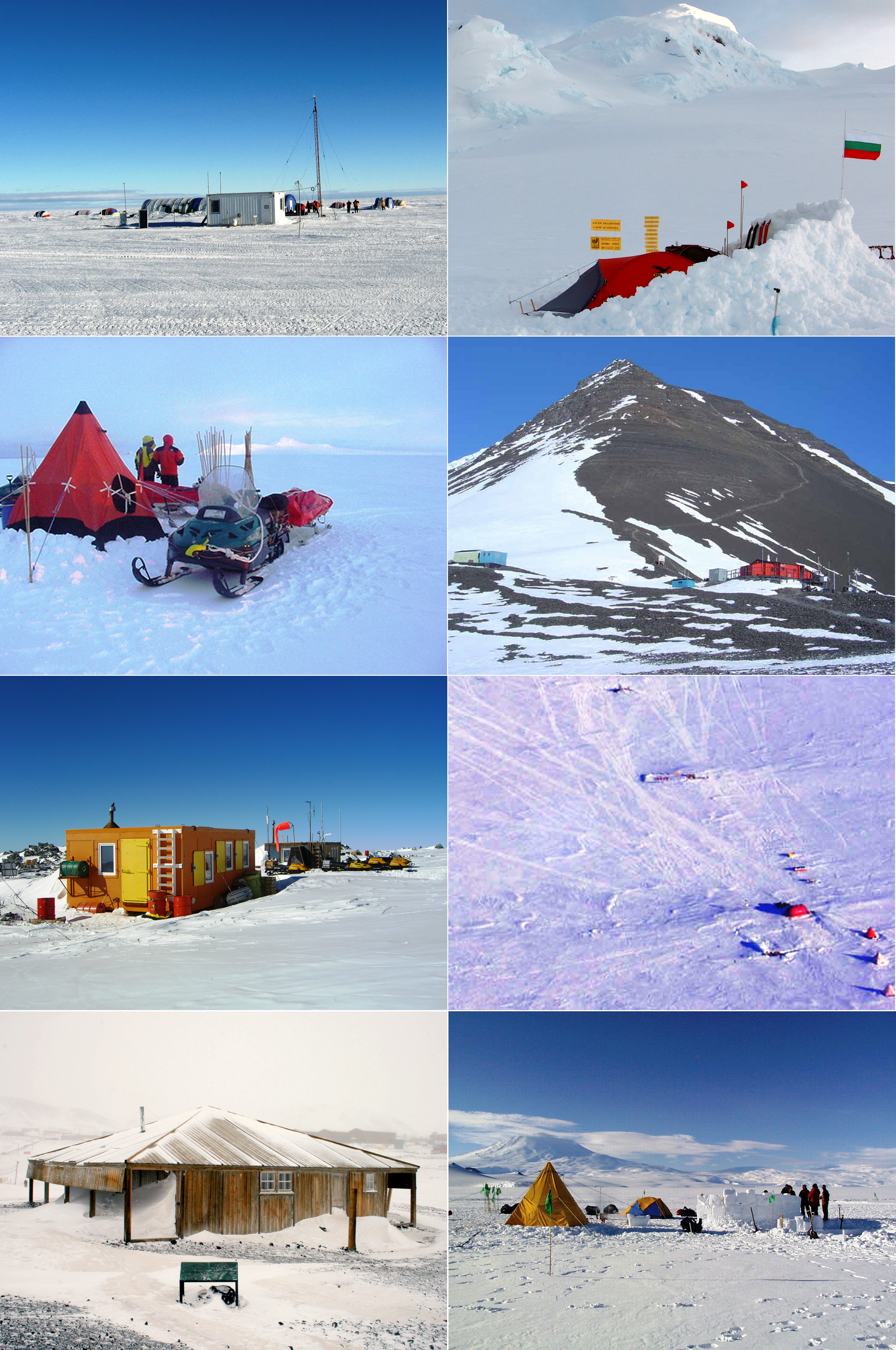
Antarctic Field Camps. Patriot Hills, Antarctica.

The Patriot Hills are a line of rock hills 5 nautical miles (9 km) long, located 3 nautical miles (6 km) east of the north end of Independence Hills in Horseshoe Valley, Heritage Range, Western Antarctica.

To the north of Patriot Hills (in their slipstream) there is an approximately 2x8 km large blue ice rink, a snow-free surface that can be used as a landing strip for large aircraft including C130 and Ilyushin Il-76 .

== History ==
The hills were mapped by United States Geological Survey (USGS) from ground surveys and U.S. Navy air photos, 1961–66. The name was applied by Advisory Committee on Antarctic Names (US-ACAN) in association with the name Heritage Range.

In 1987, the Patriot Hills Base Camp was built here by the Adventure Network International (now Antarctic Logistics and Expeditions, LLC; ALE). The camp, used only in the Antarctic summer months, was the only privately operated camp on the Antarctic continent. In 2010, they moved operations to the Union Glacier Camp.

During the Antarctic summer of 1998, a team of scientists at Carnegie Mellon University, NASA Ames Research Center and the University of Pittsburgh opened for a few weeks their camp near the Patriot Hills. They tested the robot Nomad, which was built to investigate and identify autonomous rocks and meteorites in polar regions. Since there had been no meteorite impacts in this region, the researchers scattered meteor fragments for testing.
