= TFE =

TFE may refer to:

- Tetrafluoroethylene, a chemical compound
- Transport for Edinburgh, a public transport organisation
- Trifluoroescaline, a psychedelic drug
- Trifluoroethanol, a chemical compound
- Serious Sam: The First Encounter, a video game
- The Final Experiment, a 2024 expedition to Antarctica
