= SCGC =

SCGC may refer to:

- Screen Composers Guild of Canada, a Canadian music industry association
- Sugar Cane Growers Cooperative of Florida
- Sugar Cane Growers Council, a Fijian trade union
- Union Glacier Blue-Ice Runway, in Antarctica
