= Fusco Nunatak =

Mountain in Antarctica

Fusco Nunatak (80°2′S 80°9′W) is the westernmost of the Wilson Nunataks, located just west of Hercules Inlet, at the southeastern extremity of the Heritage Range, Antarctica. It was named by the Advisory Committee on Antarctic Names for aviation electrician Thomas A. Fusco, U.S. Navy, an air crewman on the first flight from McMurdo Station to Plateau Station, 13 December 1965.
