= Union Glacier Camp =

- Antarctic seasonal camp
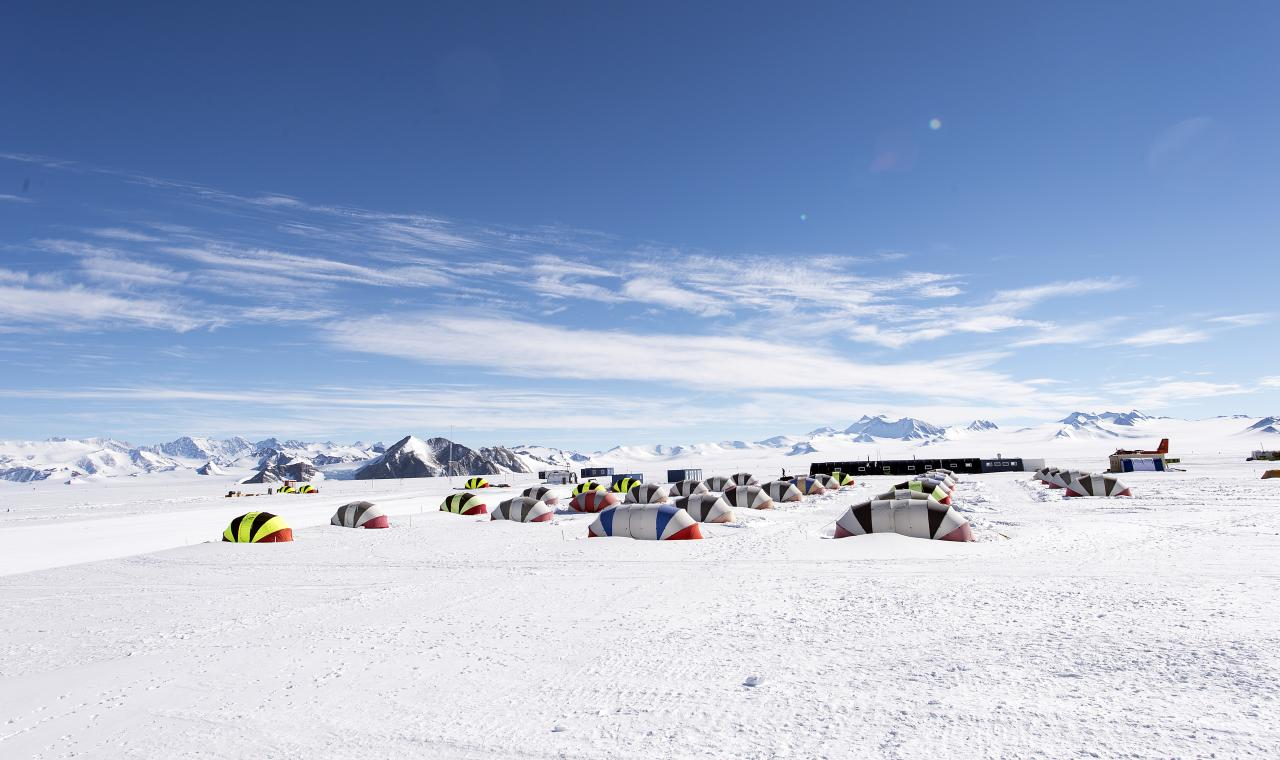
- Union Glacier Camp, December 2013.

- Location of Union Glacier Camp in Antarctica
- Coordinates: 79°46′05″S 83°15′42″W
- Location in Antarctica: Heritage Range; Ellsworth Mountains; Union Glacier; Ellsworth Land
- Operated by: Antarctic Logistics & Expeditions
- Named after: Union Glacier
- Elevation: 700 m (2,300 ft)

Population
  - Total: Up to 160
- Type: Seasonal
- Period: Summer
- Status: Operational
- Facilities: Airstrip; Double occupancy tents; Two heated dining halls and living areas; Solar power; Iridium satellite phone service; Tented office/work space (by prior arrangement).
- Website: antarctic-logistics.com/services/camp-services/

The Union Glacier Camp is the only private seasonally occupied camp site located in Ellsworth Land in Antarctica. The camp is located in the Heritage Range, below the Ellsworth Mountains, on Union Glacier, that gives the camp its name.

== Location and features ==
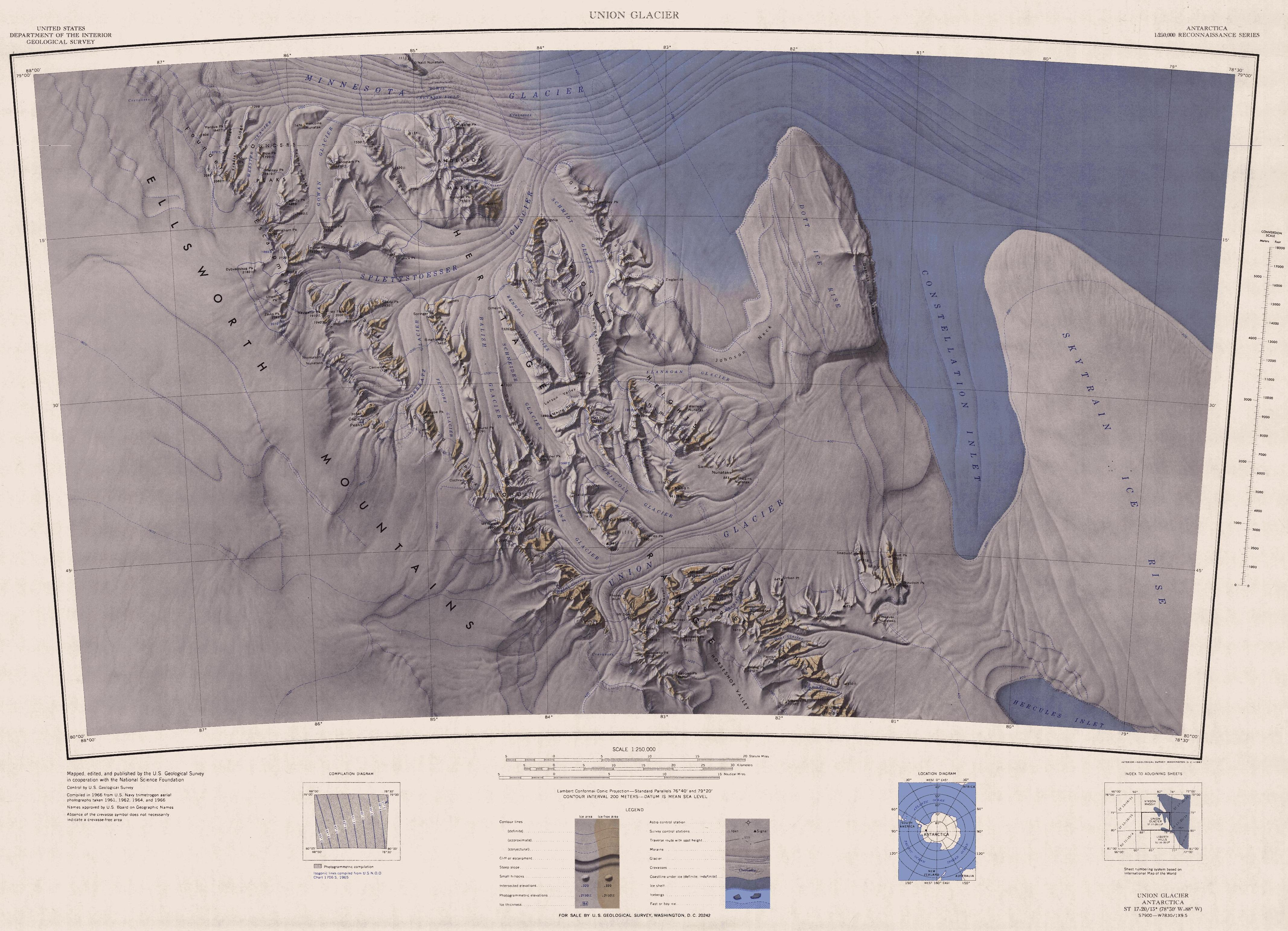
Map of Union Glacier.

The camp is operated by Antarctic Logistics & Expeditions LLC (ALE), a company that provides expedition support and tours to the interior of Antarctica. The camp is situated near Union Glacier Blue-Ice Runway SCGC a rare, naturally occurring, blue ice runway that allows wheeled jet cargo aircraft to land. Russian Ilyushin Il-76 aircraft regularly transport equipment and personnel to the camp. From Union Glacier Camp transportation to the South Pole, Vinson Massif, Hercules Inlet and other locations is by Twin Otter and Basler BT-67 ski plane. Union Glacier Camp replaced the earlier Patriot Hills Base Camp.

During the months of November to January, when the weather is the least hostile, jet charter flights are operated from Punta Arenas, Chile to the camp. Union Glacier is the site of the annual Antarctic Ice Marathon, as well as the start of the World Marathon Challenge (7 marathons on 7 continents in 7 days).

=== Total solar eclipse ===
On December 4, 2021, a total solar eclipse passed over Union Glacier Camp. It was the only human settlement in Antarctica to lie within the path of totality. This was one of two solar eclipses to occur in 2021; the other being on June 10.

=== The Final Experiment ===
The Final Experiment was a 2024 expedition to Antarctica to test the validity of modern flat Earth beliefs. It took three years of preparation and was organized by Will Duffy, an American Christian pastor who invited forty-eight online content creators to witness the midnight sun, a natural phenomenon that contradicts most flat Earth beliefs. The expedition included both flat Earthers and "globe Earthers" (people who accept the spherical Earth), selected to represent both sides of the flat Earth debate.

The expedition members traveled from Chile to Union Glacier Camp in West Antarctica and livestreamed the midnight sun for several days. The participating flat Earthers all admitted that the midnight sun was a real phenomenon. The larger flat Earth community has largely rejected the results and accused the participants, including the flat Earthers, of having faked the expedition and of being part of a larger conspiracy to promote the spherical Earth model.

== See also ==
- List of Antarctic research stations
- List of Antarctic field camps
