= Pamela Young =

First New Zealand woman to live and work in Antarctica

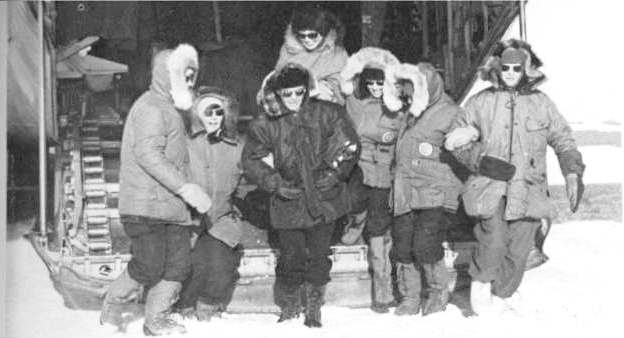
First women at the South Pole Pam Young, Jean Pearson, Lois Jones, Eileen McSaveney, Kay Lindsay and Terry Tickhill

Pamela Margaret Young (née Rawlinson) is a New Zealand Antarctic scientist. She was the first New Zealand woman to live and work in Antarctica. In 1969–70, she worked at Cape Bird as field assistant to her husband Euan, a biologist, and was among the first six women to fly to the South Pole. She wrote a book about her trip (Penguin summer or a rare bird in Antarctica). The Young Peaks in Antarctica are named after her.

== Early life and education ==
The daughter of Caren Cecilia Rawlinson (née Lyders) and Arthur Field Rawlinson, Pamela Young studied at the University of Otago and graduated BA in 1958. In 1959, she married Euan Cameron Young, a zoology lecturer at the University of Canterbury. Euan Young visited Antarctica for the first time during the 1959/60 season to work at Cape Royds, while Pamela spent the summer employed in a jam factory.

Euan and Pamela Young lived in England for several years before returning to Christchurch and Euan Young, again working for the University of Canterbury, then went on four more trips to Antarctica.

== Antarctica ==
Only a small number of New Zealanders had been to Antarctica at this time. “The number of OAEs (Old Antarctic Explorers) remained small, and invested with mystique. New Zealand’s Antarctic programme was then the prerogative of small DSIR parties, and the universities were only just beginning to realise the possibilities for research. The continent remained unvisited except by a small, privileged handful of people."

As late as 1965, Admiral James Reedy had uttered his famous definition of Antarctica as 'the womanless white continent of peace', but attitudes were slowly changing. Euan told Pamela that “the Americans are keen to take girls down this year.… so it would be fair enough for us to send one New Zealander.”

Pamela Young joined her husband as his field assistant at Cape Bird on his sixth trip. She was not the first New Zealand woman in Antarctica (that was zoologist Marie Darby, who visited Antarctica in January 1968), but she was the first to live and work there as a member of a research team, although not trained as a scientist. She was described as the "First Lady for Scott Base" when her selection was announced in June 1969.

The presence of even one woman involved extra planning for equipment, accommodation and bathroom facilities. Lane Walker Rudkin, a local clothing manufacturer, gave her woollen jerseys and ski pants, as well as “two pairs of special long-johns in the finest of creamy white wool”, so she didn't have to wear men's ones.

In November 1969, Pamela and Euan Young flew in a Starlifter from Christchurch to Williams Field and took a Snotrack to Scott Base. They spent ten weeks living and working with a small team at Cape Bird. On 17 January 1970, they made the final penguin count and headed back to Scott Base and home.

== Later life ==
In 1971, when Penguin summer was published, Pamela and Euan Young and their two children were living in Western Samoa where Euan was carrying out research into the rhinoceros beetle, an introduced pest of the coconut palm. In 1972, the family moved back to New Zealand when Euan Young was appointed to the chair of zoology at the University of Auckland. Pamela Young was a teacher at Epsom Girls' Grammar School.

In 2017, Young was selected as one of the Royal Society Te Apārangi's "150 women in 150 words", celebrating the contributions of women to knowledge in New Zealand.
