= Lois Jones (scientist) =

American geochemist

- in 1969 as she led the expedition
- Born: September 6, 1934; Berea, Ohio, U.S.
- Died: March 13, 2000 (aged 65)
- Education: Ohio State University
- Known for: Leading the first all-woman science team to Antarctica
- Scientific career
- Fields: Geochemistry
- Workplaces: University of Georgia; Kansas State University
- Thesis: The Application of Strontium Isotopes as Natural Tracers: The Origin of the Salts in the Lakes and Soils of Southern Victoria Land, Antarctica (1969)
- Doctoral advisor: Gunter Faure

Lois M. Jones (September 6, 1934 – March 13, 2000) was an American geochemist who led the first all-woman science team to Antarctica in 1969. They were also the first women to reach the South Pole. Jones was well regarded for her contribution to geological research in the McMurdo Dry Valleys, one of the few ice-free areas of Antarctica, and published many papers and abstracts.

== Early life and education ==
Jones was born in Berea, Ohio, on September 6, 1934. She completed her Bachelor of Science in 1955 and Master of Science degrees in 1959 in chemistry at Ohio State University before returning to Ohio State in 1966 for her doctoral work in geology, earning her doctorate in geology in 1969.

Using geological samples from Antarctica's Dry Valleys for her doctoral dissertation, The Application of Strontium Isotopes as Natural Tracers: the Origin of the Salts in the Lakes and Soils of Southern Victoria Land, Antarctica, Jones investigated how Southern Ocean sea floor communities responded to climate changes and weatherization. While the samples for her dissertation were provided by male colleagues who collected them in Antarctica for the Institute of Polar Studies (now Byrd Polar and Climate Research Center), Jones wanted to do her own field work in Antarctica and collect more bedrock samples and rock specimens herself in order to evaluate the salt content of a river flowing into Lake Vanda, one of the Dry Valley Lakes.

== Career and impact ==
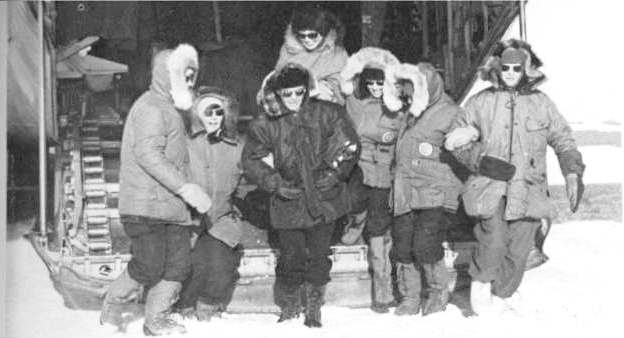
First women at the South Pole Pamela Young, Jean Pearson, Lois Jones, Eileen McSaveney, Kay Lindsay and Terry Tickhill. Rear Admiral David F. Welch is in the middle.

Jones led the first female team to Antarctica with the US Antarctic Research Program in the 1969–1970 season.

At the time Jones submitted an Antarctic research proposal to the National Science Foundation, women were still barred by the U.S. Navy from going to the continent with the US program. Colin Bull, then head of the Institute of Polar Studies, attempted over several years to persuade the U.S. Navy to allow female scientists to go to Antarctica. He supported Jones' proposal. Ultimately the U.S. Navy would also agree to support this first female research team to reach Antarctica. Jones' research proposal was accepted with the caveat that her research team was all-female and they would for the most part not be living at McMurdo station but doing field research in the Wright Valley.

The Ohio State team with Jones at the head included geologist Eileen McSaveney, Kay Lindsay, an entomologist, and Terry Lee Tickhill, a chemistry undergraduate lacking a background in geology but skilled with machinery. They spent four months in Antarctica in the McMurdo Dry Valleys collecting data and rock specimens. The team also briefly visited the South Pole. The first women in history reached the South Pole because of a request Jones' made when she was at the McMurdo station, the US Antarctic research station on the edge of the frozen Ross Sea. Jones wanted an aerial view of the geology of the location where her team would work, and asked to join a supply flight to the Pole. The US Navy then invited all seven women in Antarctica at the time to be the first at the Pole. The women on the continent at that time were Jones and her team, New Zealand biologist Pamela Young, Jean Pearson, a reporter for the Detroit Free Press, and Christine Muller-Schwarze, an American researcher. All but Muller-Schwarze, who declined as she did not want to interrupt her field work at Cape Crozier studying penguins, were the first women to reach the South Pole on November 12, 1969. After their expedition, the U.S. Navy officially began accepting women at McMurdo Station.

After a successful season, Jones and her team returned to the Institute of Polar Studies, did analysis of the rock specimens they collected, and produced numerous publications on their findings. The samples they collected helped reveal insights into the sources and implications of strontium isotopes in Taylor Valley. Jones went on to become assistant professor in the department of geology at the University of Georgia, senior research scientist on petroleum geology. She then served as assistant professor of geology at Kansas State University. She also spent sixteen years at Conoco. After retiring, Jones volunteered in the English as a Second Language program in Columbus, Ohio.

The Lois M. Jones Papers were donated by her estate to the Ohio State University Byrd Polar and Climate Research Center Archival Program. This special collection includes 18,275 35 mm slides documenting Jones' research science with the Institute of Polar Studies and the all-women Antarctic scientific expedition she led in 1969.

== Legacy ==
Jones endowed the Lois M. Jones Fellowship Fund in Geological Sciences and the Lois M. Jones Endowment for Cancer Research Fellowships at Ohio State University. She is also the namesake of Jones Terrace, located in the Antarctic Olympus Range.
