= Sky Blu (Antarctica) =

- Logistics and air facility
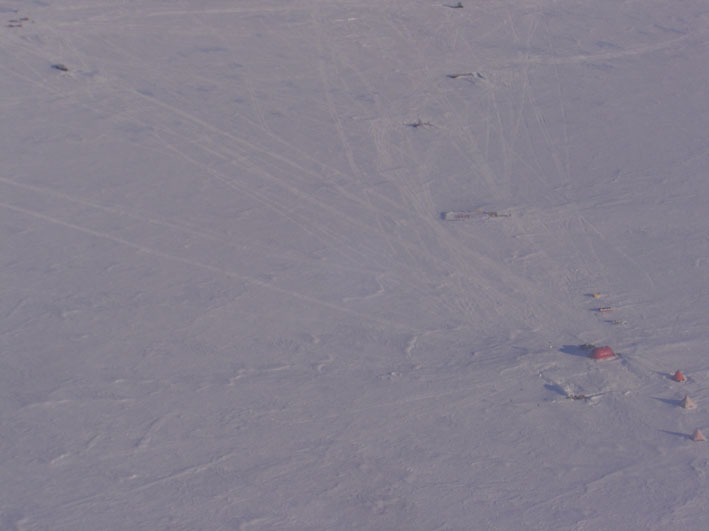
- Sky Blu Melon hut and ancillary facilities, taken on approach to the runway. The hut and facilities are located about 1.5 kilometres (0.93 mi) from the runway, pictured top left.

- Location of Sky Blu in Antarctica
- Coordinates: 74°51′23″S 71°35′13″W
- Country: United Kingdom
- Location in Antarctica: Palmer Land; Antarctica
- Administered by: British Antarctic Survey
- Established: c. 1997
- Elevation: 1,435 m (4,708 ft)

Population
  - Total: Up to 6
- Time zone: UTC-3 (FKST)
- Type: Seasonal
- Period: Summer
- Status: Operational
- Facilities: Two fibreglass modules
- Website: www.antarctica.ac.uk

Sky Blu is a forward operating station for the British Antarctic Survey located in southern Palmer Land, Antarctica. It is in an area of blue ice, an extremely hard and dense ice which has lost the air bubbles that normally cloud the ice. It provides a runway able to accommodate wheeled aircraft that are larger than can be handled by other types of runways in the area.

The facility is used to store fuel drums and field equipment for onward transport by the Twin Otter aircraft. The camp is staffed by a minimum of 2, but usually 3 people, including a mechanic. Staff eat and sleep in a Melon hut, but there is also a garage and other tents.

== History ==
It was first located by the British Antarctic Survey (BAS) in 1993-94 and rapidly became an essential tool in BAS's ability to operate further south. This is mainly because the Blue Ice runway is able to accommodate wheeled aircraft. BAS can therefore fly its Dash-7 4-engined plane from Rothera directly to Sky Blu. The Dash has a much higher load carrying capability than the Twin Otters also used by BAS.

Sky Blu became fully operational in the 1997-98 field season, and has had an increase in use by BAS ever since. The old field camp at Sky-Hi Nunataks was abandoned soon after, with the weather station finally being removed in November 2004.

== The Melon hut ==
Accommodation for the on-site staff is in a fibreglass hut known as a Melon hut, with several support tents for supplies and equipment such as tractor units and fuel. The Melon hut is approximately 15 by 9 feet (4.6 m × 2.7 m) and roughly the shape of a melon, hence the name. The hut is painted red for visibility.

== Sky Blu Ice Runway ==
Sky Blu Ice Runway
- IATA: none; ICAO: EGAT

Summary
- Airport type: Private
- Operator: British Antarctic Survey
- Location: Ellsworth Land
- Time zone: (UTC-3)
- Elevation AMSL: 4,708 ft (1,435 m)
- Coordinates: 74°51′23″S 71°35′13″W

Map
- Location of airfield in Antarctica

Runways
Direction	Length		Surface
Direction	ft	m	Surface
14/32	3,960	1,207	Blue Ice

The blue ice runway is groomed by the camp staff using commercial lightweight snow ploughs and blowers which could be shipped in by Dash 7 aircraft. When the wind is favourable, and the conditions good, a runway 1.2 kilometres (0.75 mi) in length and 50 metres (160 ft) wide is possible. However, operations are often hampered by much lighter winds causing knee high snow drifts which reduce contrast. The runway is marked by flags to improve contrast for approaching planes.

In January 2023, a Royal Air Force A400M Atlas transport aircraft based in the Falkland Islands, and supported by a Voyager tanker aircraft, dropped the first of 300 fuel drums at the facility as part of a tasking to resupply the British Antarctic Survey.

== See also ==
- List of Antarctic research stations
- List of Antarctic field camps
- Airports in Antarctica
