= Blue ice runway =

Antarctic ice runway

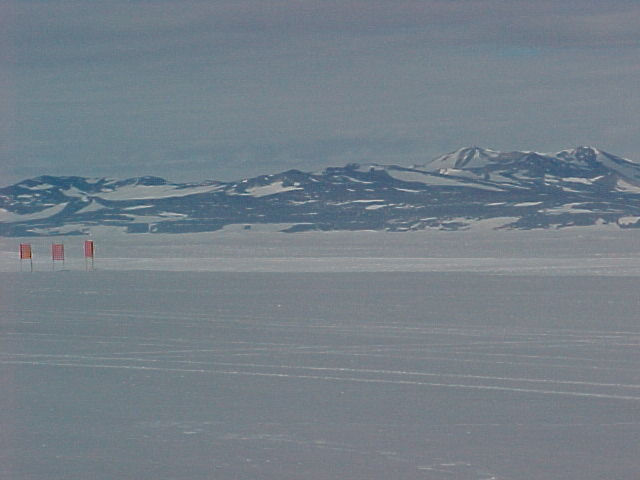
Pegasus Field, a blue ice runway at McMurdo Station

A blue ice runway is a runway constructed in Antarctic areas with no net annual snow accumulation. The density of the ice increases as air bubbles are forced out, strengthening the resultant ice surface so that aircraft landings using wheels instead of skis can be supported. Such runways simplify the transfer of materials to research stations, since wheeled aircraft can carry much heavier loads than ski-equipped aircraft.

Blue ice runways are created as a way of streamlining transport to the interior. Without them, most heavy materials must be brought by ship, then ferried inland by ski-equipped smaller aircraft. Large, wheeled aircraft can fly directly into the interior, saving time and money. In particular, they allow for rare medical evacuations to take place year round. The United States Antarctic Program uses them to support its substantial science activities.

Because of ice's low coefficient of friction, planes tend to decelerate with reverse thrust, as opposed to traditional means of braking the wheels, and so runways are often several miles long.

== List of blue ice runways ==
Blue ice runways in Antarctica include:

- Sky Blu Blue Ice Runway, Ellsworth Land, serving Sky Blu Forward Operating Station, and operated by the British Antarctic Survey
- Pegasus Field, Ross Dependency, serving McMurdo Station, and operated by the United States Antarctic Program (closed since 2016)
- Troll Airfield, Queen Maud Land, serving Troll Station, and operated by the Norwegian Polar Institute
- Union Glacier Blue-Ice Runway, Ellsworth Land, serving Union Glacier Camp, and operated by Antarctic Logistics and Expeditions LLC
- Wilkins Runway, Wilkes Land, serving Casey Station, and operated by the Australian Antarctic Division
- Novo Runway, Schirmacher Oasis, serving Novolazarevskaya and Maitri stations, operated by Antarctic Logistics and Expeditions LLC
- Wolf's Fang Runway, Queen Maud Land operated by White Desert Ltd

== See also ==
- List of airports in Antarctica
- Ice Runway – McMurdo's seasonal runway on floating sea ice in McMurdo Sound
