= Blue-ice area =

Blue area of an ice sheet

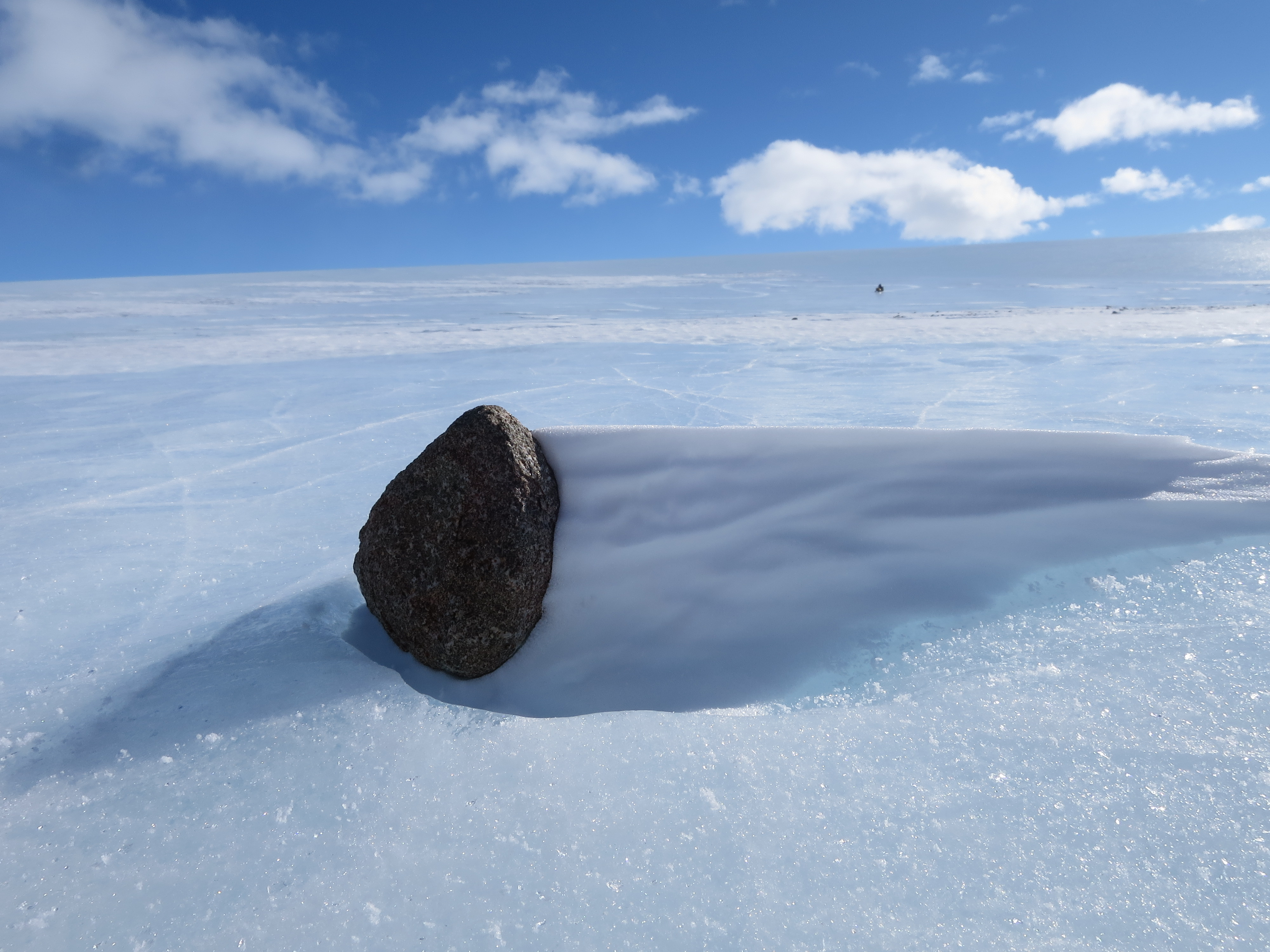
A blue-ice area in the Miller Range with a meteorite

A blue-ice area is an ice-covered area of Antarctica where wind-driven snow transport and sublimation result in net mass loss from the ice surface in the absence of melting, forming a blue surface that contrasts with the more common white Antarctic surface. Such blue-ice areas typically form when the movement of both air and ice are obstructed by topographic obstacles such as mountains that emerge from the ice sheet, generating particular climatic conditions where the net snow accumulation is exceeded by wind-driven sublimation and snow transports.

Only about 1% of Antarctic ice area can be considered to be blue-ice area, but they have attracted scientific interest due to the large numbers of meteorites that accumulate on them; these meteorites either fall directly on the blue-ice area and remain there, or they fall elsewhere into the ice sheet and are transported to the blue-ice area by ice flow. Additionally, ice up to 2.7 million years old has been obtained from blue-ice areas. Blue-ice areas are sometimes used as runways for aircraft.

== Appearance ==
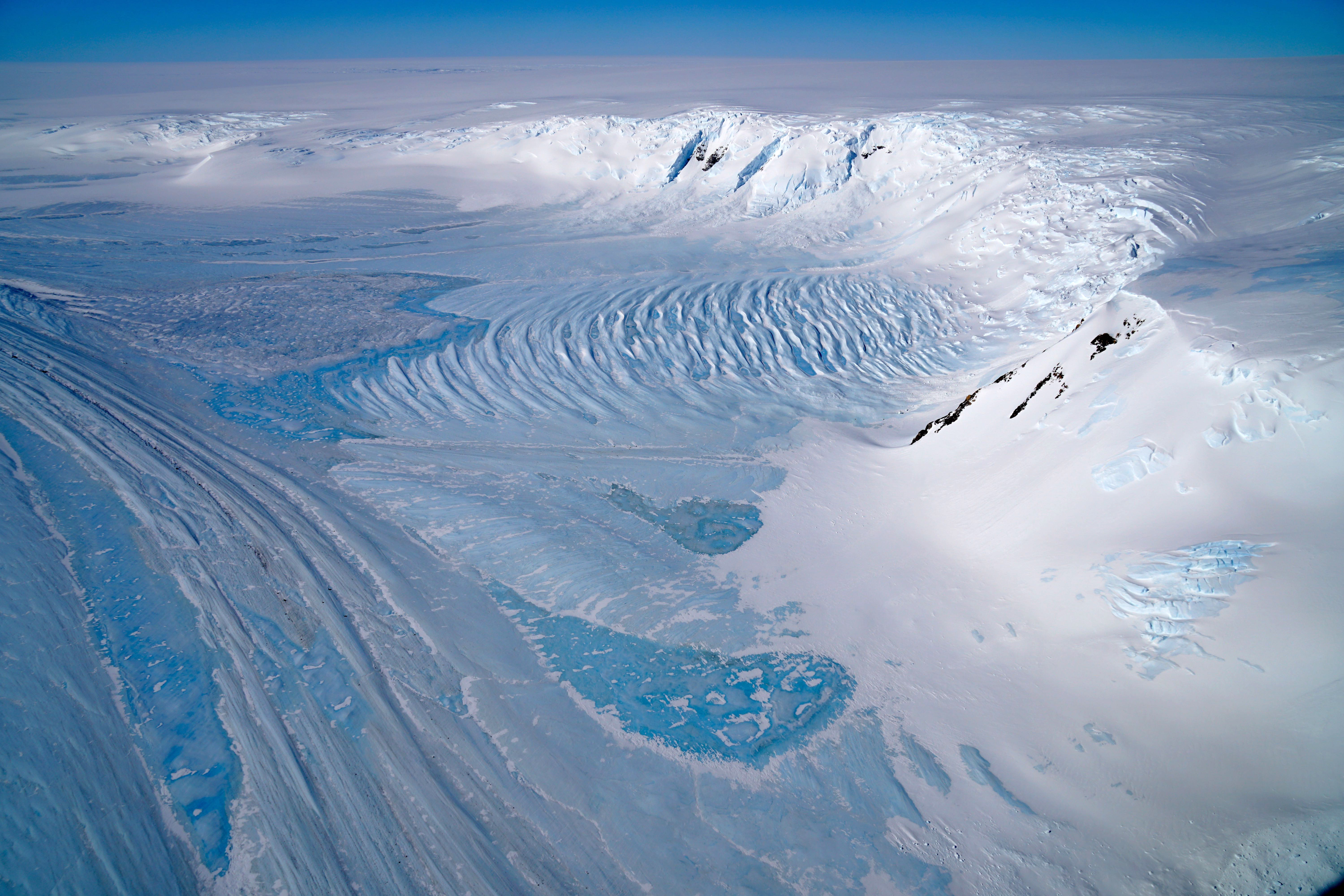
A glacier in the Transantarctic Mountains. Blue ice is seen as a lighter blue in the photograph, while the darker blue is formed by re-frozen melt ponds.

Blue-ice areas have a generally smooth and often rippled appearance, a blue colour and a sparseness of bubbles in the ice. This light blue colour is a consequence of the absorption of light by ice and air bubbles encased within it, and is the source of the name "blue-ice area". It contrasts markedly with the white colour of Antarctic plains and can be seen from space and from aerial images, while the density of the blue ice makes it appear on radar images as a dark ice form. Scalloped or rippled surfaces have almost regular surface patterns, although wholly smooth blue-ice areas exist as well, and the terrain even of rippled surfaces features very low aerodynamic roughness, perhaps among the lowest of all permanent natural surfaces. This is because most aerodynamic drag is caused by surface anomalies less than a centimetre long, not larger uneven forms. Wave structures form through sublimation.

The occurrence of supraglacial moraines at blue-ice areas has been reported; these form when debris contained within a glacier accumulates at the surface due to melting or sublimation. Small depressions in the ice known as cryoconite holes are common and are formed where rocks got embedded in the ice, but are absent on more mountainous blue-ice areas.

Typical blue-ice areas often feature intense katabatic winds, with average winds reaching 80 kilometres per hour (50 mph) and gusts of up to 200 kilometres per hour (120 mph); such winds can remove and take up large amounts of snow. They are usually warmer than comparable snow-covered areas, sometimes by up to 6 °C (11 °F), which makes them identifiable from brightness temperature imaging. This warming is due to the lower albedo of the blue ice compared to snow, which results in them absorbing more sunlight and warming more. Blue-ice areas also alter the climate above them.

As commonly defined, blue-ice areas display little or no evidence of melting, thus excluding glaciers and frozen lakes in the Antarctic Dry Valleys where sublimation-dominated ice also occurs, but which may be more comparable to the ablation areas of regular glaciers.

== Occurrence ==
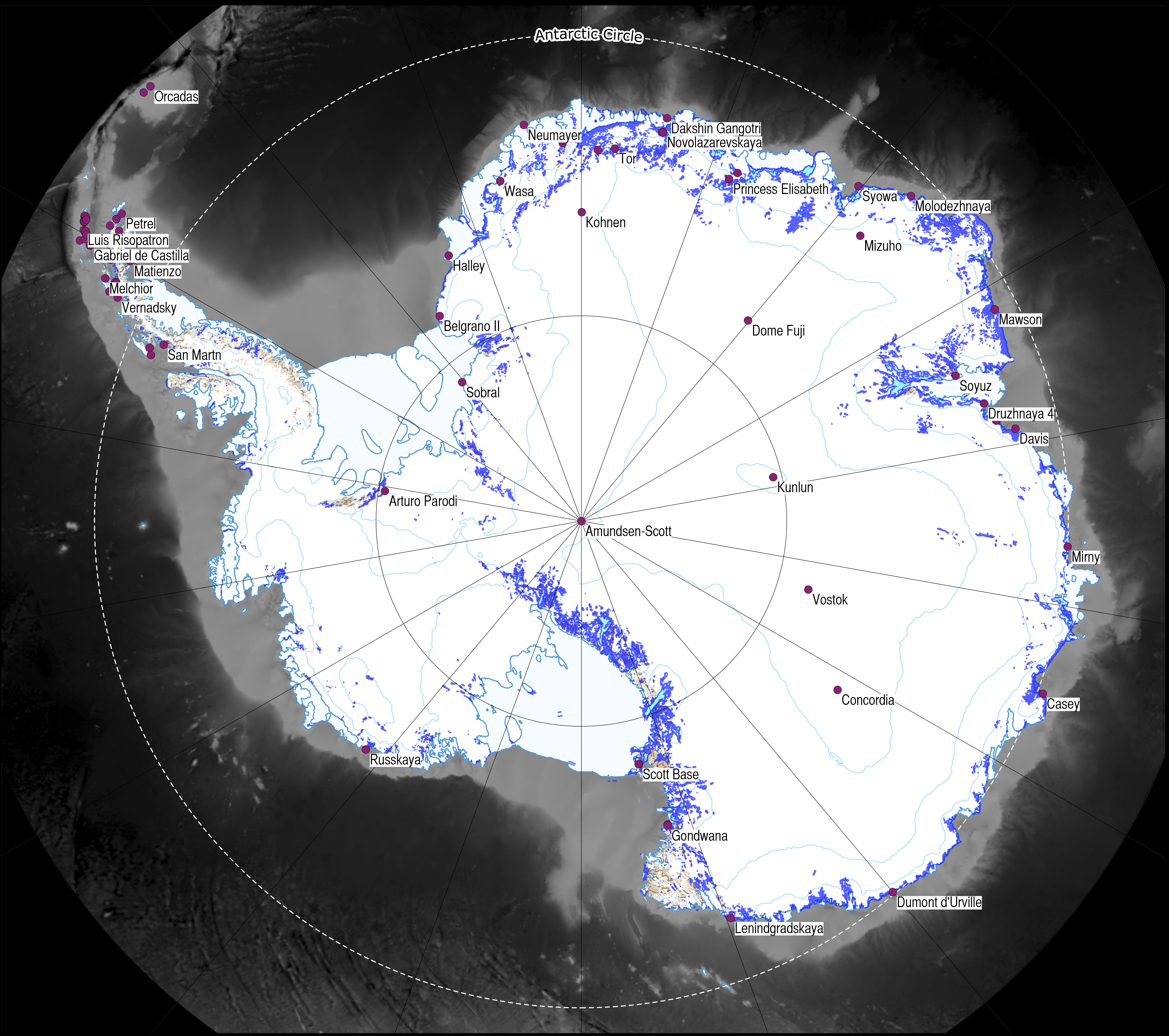
Occurrence of blue-ice areas (dark blue) in Antarctica

Blue-ice areas were first discovered in 1949–1952 by the Norwegian–British–Swedish Antarctic Expedition. They have been identified only in Antarctica, although similar ice patches on Greenland have been reported and blue ice is widespread at glaciers worldwide. Blue-ice areas make up only about 1% of the Antarctic surface ice; however, they are locally common and scattered across the continent, especially in coastal or mountainous areas, but not directly beside the coastline.

They have been found in Dronning Maud Land, the catchment of the Lambert Glacier, the Transantarctic Mountains and Victoria Land. Individual locations in Antarctica include areas of the Allan Hills, the Queen Fabiola Mountains (the Yamato ice field there covers an area of 4,000 square kilometres (1,500 sq mi) and is the largest such structure), Scharffenberg-Botnen and the Sør Rondane Mountains. Their location has been correlated with specific atmospheric pressures, temperatures and a relative humidity of less than 100%.

== Origin and processes ==
Blue-ice areas are regions where more snow is removed by sublimation or by wind than accumulates by precipitation or wind-driven transport, leading to the emergence of (blue) ice. In most of Antarctica, the net tendency is for snow to accumulate except in coastal Antarctica where melting occurs and blue-ice areas where sublimation dominates. This sublimation occurs at rates of 3–350 centimetres per year (1.2–137.8 in/year) snow water equivalent and is balanced by ice flow, with the sublimation rate decreasing with elevation and increasing with temperature. Summer also increases the sublimation rate, although it still occurs during winter. Winds remove snow that rest on the surface and could even scour exposed ice away, although the occurrence of scouring is not established without doubt and the role of abrasion is also unclear.

Such areas exist even in the coldest parts of Antarctica, and they are characterized by high mean wind speeds and low precipitation. Once they have formed, the smooth surface prevents snow from accumulating as it is quickly blown away by the wind, and the blue colour increases the absorption of sunlight and thus sublimation; both these phenomena act to maintain the blue-ice area, and wind-driven transport of warm air can cause the blue-ice area to expand downwind.

Blue-ice areas are common in mountainous regions. Presumably, irregular surface topography obstructs ice flow and locally creates atmospheric conditions suitable for the development of blue-ice areas. Irregular topography does not need to be exposed to the surface to generate blue-ice areas, although they must have an effect on the ice surface topography to induce the formation of blue-ice areas. Consequently, many blue-ice areas form when ice thicknesses decrease, which has been postulated to happen during interglacials although in general the past history of blue-ice areas is poorly known. Such areas may not have existed at all during glacial times when the ice sheet was thicker. Changes in mean wind speeds cause short-term fluctuations in the land covered by blue-ice areas. Global warming is predicted to decrease wind speeds across Antarctica causing a small decrease in the land surface covered by blue-ice areas. Thermal contraction of blue-ice can cause icequakes. There is evidence that microbial ecosystems can form in blue-ice, when there are cryoconites.

=== Age ===
Ages of particular blue-ice areas have been inferred from the ages of the meteorites there discovered, although redistribution of meteorites between various areas through ice flow can cause this procedure to yield erroneous age estimates. The oldest blue-ice areas may be up to 2.5 million years old and the ice in them can be quite old as well, with ages of several hundred thousand years estimated on the basis of ice flow dynamics and radiometric dating and the development of a horizontal stratigraphy. This occurs because ice blocked by obstacles stagnates and moves at a rate commensurate with the ablation rate. Younger ages have been found as well however, such as 250,000 years old at the Allan Hills, 75,000 years old at the Yamato Mountains, and 25,000 years old at the Larsen blue-ice area.

=== Types ===
Several subtypes have been defined, which encompass most blue-ice areas.

- Type I form in the lee of an obstacle and are the most common type of blue-ice area although they usually cover only a small surface area, compared to the other three types. They are often 50 – 100 times as long as the obstacle is high, which is often a mountain.
- Type II form where katabatic winds clear snow from the surface until ice appears. They form on valley glaciers.
- Type III form where winds blowing on steep slopes – or even over flat terrain – remove snow from the surface.
- Type IV form by wind removing snow from the lowest part of a glacier basin.

== Meteorites ==
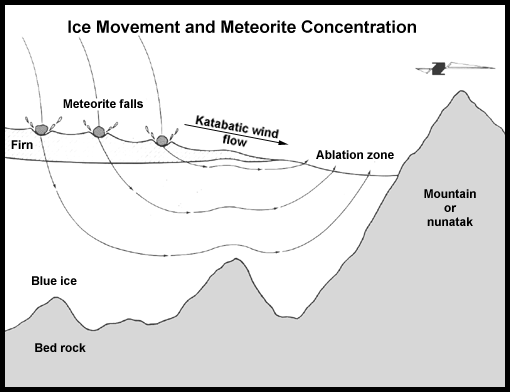
Pathways of meteorites in ice

Blue-ice areas are known primarily for the meteorites that accumulate there. They originally fell on ice elsewhere and were transported by ice flows to the blue-ice area, where they accumulate when the ice in which they were encased ablates away; this mechanism has been compared to a conveyor belt that transports meteorites to blue-ice areas. Additionally, meteorites that fell directly on the blue-ice areas are represented; because of the often great age of the surface a number of meteorites can accumulate even without ice-driven transport. Over 20,000 meteorites from blue-ice areas were known by 1999, a large share of all known meteorites on Earth.

Meteorite findings occur only on a minority of all blue-ice areas and are mostly limited to inland blue-ice areas whereas coastal ones tend to be lacking in meteorites. This might reflect the fact that at low altitude the ice surrounding the meteorites can melt due to solar heating of the meteorite, thus removing it from view. Many meteorites are threatened by climate change, which can cause the meteorites to melt into the underlying ice.

== Research history ==
The earliest research in blue-ice areas occurred during the Norwegian–British–Swedish Antarctic Expedition in 1949–1952, and was followed by two decades of mostly geological and geomorphological research. The discovery of meteorites in a blue-ice area of the Yamato Mountains led to an uptick in scientific interest; a number of programs to collect meteorites began. This also led to increased research in the glaciological and dynamical properties of blue-ice areas, and later to their meteorological and climatological implications.

== Use ==
The hard, flat and smooth surfaces of blue-ice areas have been used as aircraft runways (blue ice runways) in parts of Antarctica. The very old ice in blue-ice areas has been used to reconstruct past climate, and the temporal resolution may be larger than in deep ice cores. Blue-ice areas are candidate sites for ice core drilling aimed at recovering 1.5 million year old ice, 2.7 million year old ice has been recovered from such areas and older ice still - containing trapped air bubbles - may crop out in some blue-ice areas.
