= Union Glacier Blue-Ice Runway =

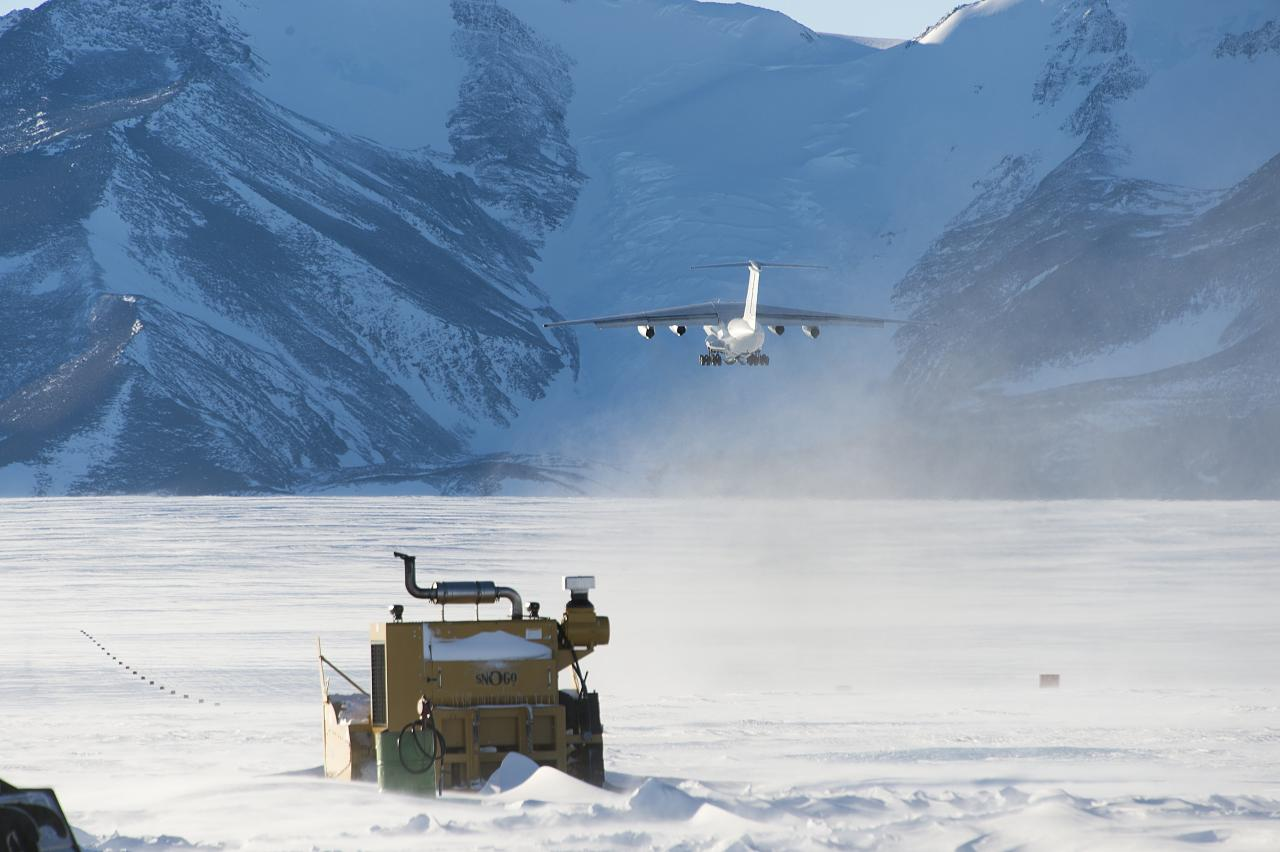
- Ilyushin Il-76 at Union Glacier Blue-Ice Runway
- IATA: UGL; ICAO: SCGC

Summary
- Airport type: Public
- Operator: Antarctic Logistics and Expeditions LLC
- Serves: Union Glacier Camp
- Location: Heritage Range, Ellsworth Mountains, Antarctica
- Elevation AMSL: 2,461 ft (750 m)
- Coordinates: 79°46′40″S 83°19′15″W

Map
- Location of airfield in Antarctica

Runways
Direction	Length		Surface
Direction	ft	m	Surface
18/36	9,842x 164	3,000x 50	Blue ice

Union Glacier Blue-Ice Runway (IATA: UGL, ICAO: SCGC) is the blue ice runway for Union Glacier Camp in Antarctica. It is located in the Heritage Range, Ellsworth Mountains, on the glacier that gives it its name. It is operated by Antarctic Logistics & Expeditions LLC (ALE), a company that provides expedition support and tours to the interior of Antarctica.

The runway was certified by the Chilean Directorate General of Civil Aviation in December 2008.

== See also ==
- List of airports in Antarctica
