= Eileen R. McSaveney =

American-born geologist and science writer in New Zealand

Eileen R. McSaveney (born 1944) is an American, naturalised New Zealander, geologist known for being part of the first all-women science team to Antarctica. McSaveney was born and grew up in Buffalo, New York.

== Education and career ==
McSaveney completed her bachelor of Geology at the State University of New York at Buffalo, where she was the only woman in her class. She later moved to Ohio State University to complete her masters and PhD degrees in Geology. After completing her PhD in 1976, McSaveney moved to Christchurch, New Zealand. McSaveney taught evening classes in geology, evolution and climate change at the University of Canterbury. She has also worked as an editor and writer, specialising in geology and geological history, landscapes, glaciers, and environmental hazards such as earthquakes, volcanic eruptions, floods and tsunamis. McSaveney was the assistant editor of the New Zealand Journal of Hydrology for more than 35 years. McSaveney has co-authored and edited multiple scientific and popular papers and technical reports.

=== Work in Antarctica ===
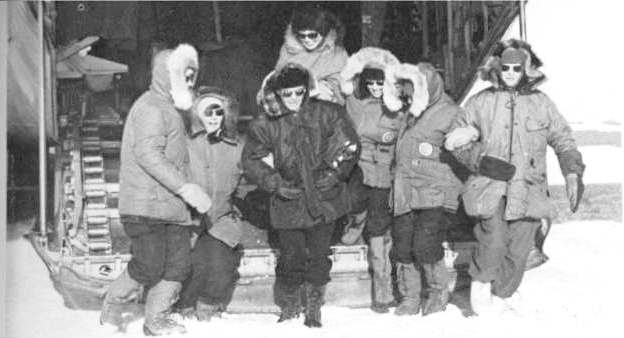
First women at the South Pole; Pamela Young, Jean Pearson, Lois Jones, Eileen McSaveney, Kay Lindsay and Terry Tickhill

While completing her Masters in 1969, McSaveney was part of the first group of only women scientists to visit Antarctica. The team was led by geochemist Lois M. Jones, and other party members included Kay Lindsay and Terry Tickhill. They spent four months collecting data and rock samples in the McMurdo Dry Valleys. The team, together with New Zealander Pamela Young and Jean Pearson of the Detroit Free Press were flown to South Pole Station and thus on 11 November 1969 became the first women to set foot at the South Pole.

Two years after her first trip, McSaveney returned to Antarctica for three months as a field assistant for Maurice J McSaveney, her husband.

== Awards and recognition ==
In 2011, Eileen R. McSaveney received an award from the New Zealand Hydrological society for her contribution of the science of Hydrology in New Zealand.

McSaveney was an editor for the research team that led to the extension of 1.600.000 km2 of New Zealand's continental shelf. As a result of this effort, McSaveney and her team received an award for outstanding science by the National Institute of Water and Atmospheric Research.

The McSaveney Spur was named by the Advisory Committee on Antarctic Names after the work conducted by Eileen and Maurice McSaveney on the Meserve Glacier and in Wright Valley between 1969 and 1972.
