= The Final Experiment (expedition) =

Antarctic expedition to test Flat Earth

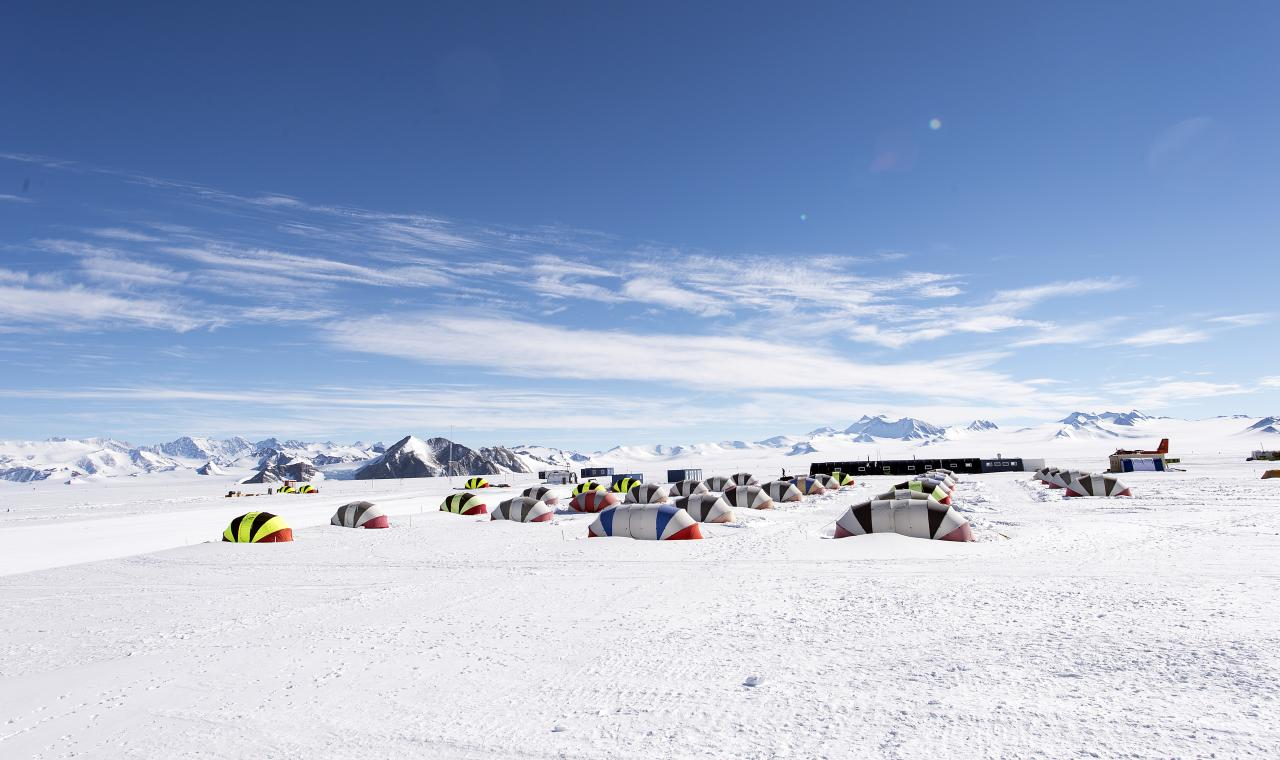
- Union Glacier Camp (shown in 2013), where the expedition took place.
- Date: December 14–17, 2024
- Duration: 4 days
- Motive: Observing the midnight sun to test modern flat Earth beliefs
- Organized by: Will Duffy
- Participants: Will Duffy; 7 content creators Others

The Final Experiment was a 2024 expedition to Antarctica to test the validity of modern flat Earth beliefs. It took three years of preparation and was organized by Will Duffy, an American Christian pastor who invited forty-eight online content creators to witness the midnight sun, a natural phenomenon that contradicts most flat Earth beliefs. The expedition included both flat Earthers and "globe Earthers" (people who accept the spherical Earth), selected to represent both sides of the flat Earth debate.

The expedition members traveled from Chile to Union Glacier Camp in West Antarctica and livestreamed the midnight sun for several days. The participating flat Earthers all admitted that the midnight sun was a real phenomenon. The larger flat Earth community has largely rejected the results and accused the participants, including the flat Earthers, of having faked the expedition and of being part of a larger conspiracy to promote the spherical Earth model.

== Flat Earth conspiracy beliefs ==
Earth's roughly spherical shape was established by Hellenistic astronomy in the 3rd century BC and can be confirmed by many types of empirical observation, including the appearance of distant objects on Earth's surface, lunar eclipses, the appearance of the Moon, observation of the sky from a certain altitude, observation of certain fixed stars from different locations, observations of the Sun, surface navigation, grid distortion on a spherical surface, weather systems, and gravity.

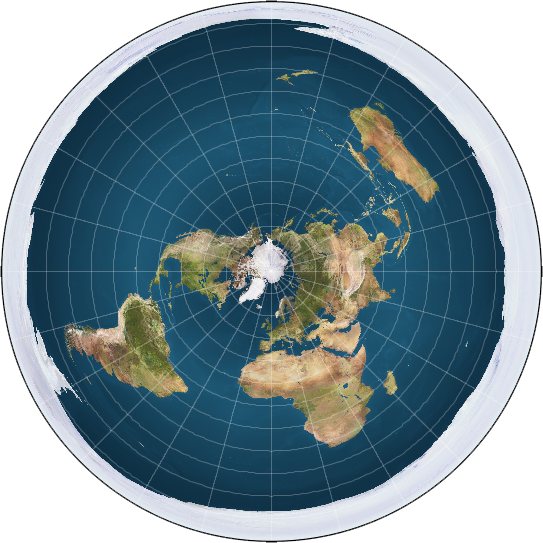
The azimuthal equidistant projection has been co-opted as a representation of a flat Earth.

Modern flat Earthers have used social media sites such as YouTube, Twitter, and Reddit to spread anti-scientific and pseudoscientific conspiracy theories claiming the shape of the Earth is a flat disc. The National Center for Science Education has described the flat Earth movement as a form of extreme Biblical-literalist theology. Right-wing political commentators such as Candace Owens and Tucker Carlson have given a platform to flat Earth beliefs.

According to flat Earth beliefs, Antarctica is usually depicted as an "ice wall" encircling the Earth. According to that model, the Sun should appear to rise and set each day in Antarctica, and could not be observed in the sky continuously for 24 hours. Hence, observing the midnight sun would falsify Flat Earth beliefs.

== Expedition ==
Will Duffy is a volunteer Christian pastor of Agape Kingdom Fellowship in Wheat Ridge, Colorado, and a former investment broker. The idea to settle the flat Earth debate by observing the midnight sun in Antarctica came from discussions between Duffy and a friend who had posted about his belief in a flat Earth on Facebook. According to Duffy's website, both flat Earthers and their opponents agreed that being able to observe the Sun in the sky over Antarctica for 24 hours continuously would refute the idea of a flat Earth. The midnight sun occurs when the Southern Hemisphere faces the Sun because of the tilt of the Earth's axis, a phenomenon flat earthers deny.

Planning for the expedition took about three years. Duffy invited twenty-four flat Earthers and twenty-four "globe Earthers" to make a trip to the privately operated Union Glacier Camp located at approximately 79 degrees south latitude. The actual expedition included four flat Earth proponents and four non-flat Earthers at a cost of approximately $35,000 per person. Some expedition members crowdfunded their trip, while Duffy says he paid the travel costs for four of the participants. Duffy also started a YouTube channel called "The Final Experiment" to promote the expedition and document the results.

No flat Earth proponents had previously visited Antarctica; a popular conspiracy theory holds that the 1959 Antarctic Treaty restricted access to the continent during summer to preserve the "myth" of a 24-hour Sun. Despite this, the party disembarked at Union Glacier Camp without issue after a flight from Chile. Using Starlink, they were able to live-stream the midnight sun for three days.

== Reactions ==
Jeran Campanella, an American YouTuber popular among flat Earth content creators as "Jeranism", acknowledged that his flat Earth model was no longer valid after witnessing the midnight sun firsthand. He later told The Denver Post that he was going to "step away" from the flat-Earth community. Fellow flat Earth creator Austin Whitsitt of "Witsit Gets It" admitted being wrong about the existence of a 24-hour sun, but said he was still open to the Earth being flat, stating that there might be a way to reconcile flat Earth beliefs with observations of the 24-hour Sun.

The wider flat Earth community has largely denied the results of the expedition, claiming that the footage was filmed in a dome studio or on a green screen, and that the participants were part of a larger conspiracy to promote the globe model. During a sermon on December 30, Alabama pastor Dean Odle suggested that Satan created a fireball to act as a false Sun. Some flat Earthers accused Duffy of taking funds from his church to finance the expedition, which he has denied. Dominic Enyart, a friend of Duffy and a member of his congregation, said the accusations were baseless.

Duffy stated of the overall reaction from flat Earthers: "The flat Earth community is imploding. They cannot decide what to believe. They've all come up with their own conspiracies." Campanella suggested that Duffy might come to regret the expedition, saying he had become "this evil villain of the flat-Earth world".
