= Hercules Inlet =

Inlet of Antarctica

Coordinates: 80°5′S 78°30′W

Location of Hercules Inlet in Queen Elizabeth Land, Antarctica

Hercules Inlet is a large, narrow, ice-filled inlet which forms a part of the southwestern margin of the Ronne Ice Shelf. It is bounded on the west by the south-eastern flank of the Heritage Range, and on the north by Skytrain Ice Rise. Hercules Inlet marks the southern end of Zumberge Coast and the northwestern end of Queen Elizabeth Land. The inlet was named by the Advisory Committee on Antarctic Names for the LC-130 Hercules aircraft used by the U.S. Naval Support Force, Antarctica, as a photographic and load carrying plane.

Hercules Inlet is one of the common starting points for long distance expeditions to the South Pole, taking anywhere from 25 to 81 days.

The first expedition from Hercules Inlet to the South Pole took place in 1998, led by Martyn Williams. This 50-day expedition opened up the doorway for South Pole overland journeys, and has become the classic route for most expeditions. British Army officer Preet Chandi, known for being the first woman of colour to complete a solo expedition to the South Pole, used this route, setting off from Hercules Inlet in November 2022. In December 2023 she used Hercules Inlet once again as the starting point for an expedition skiing solo to the South Pole, this time claiming to be the fastest woman to complete the journey (result to be verified).

The slopes south of the inlet area are covered in crevasse fields, making travel through them treacherous without prior knowledge of their whereabouts. The Wilson Nunataks can be seen from the inlet as well.
