= South Pole =

Southernmost point on Earth

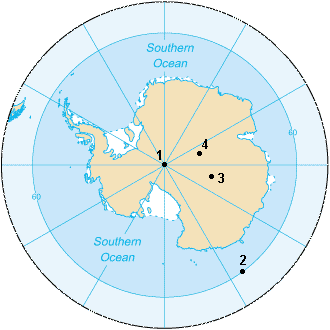
1. South Geographic Pole; 2. South Magnetic Pole (2007); 3. South Geomagnetic Pole (2005); 4. South pole of inaccessibility

The South Pole, also known as the Geographic South Pole or Terrestrial South Pole, is the point in the Southern Hemisphere where the Earth's axis of rotation meets its surface. It is called the True South Pole to distinguish from the magnetic south pole.

The South Pole is by definition the southernmost point on the Earth, lying antipodally to the North Pole. It defines geodetic latitude 90° South, as well as the direction of true south. At the South Pole all directions point North; all lines of longitude converge there, so its longitude can be defined as any degree value. No time zone has been assigned to the South Pole, so any time can be used as the local time. Along tight latitude circles, clockwise is east and counterclockwise is west. The South Pole is at the center of the Southern Hemisphere. Situated on the continent of Antarctica, it is the site of the United States Amundsen–Scott South Pole Station, which was established in 1956 and has been permanently staffed since then.

Because the South Pole is covered by an ice sheet roughly 3.2 km (2.0 mi) thick that is slowly moving, the geographic marker must be moved several meters each year. Also, buildings slowly become buried in snow because it does not melt. There is a marker at the geographic South Pole placed each year, and also a Ceremonial South Pole marked with various flags and a special post.

== Geography ==
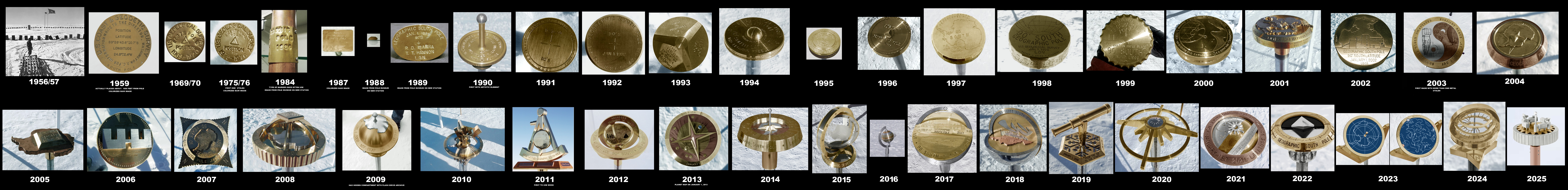
History of South Pole marker designs

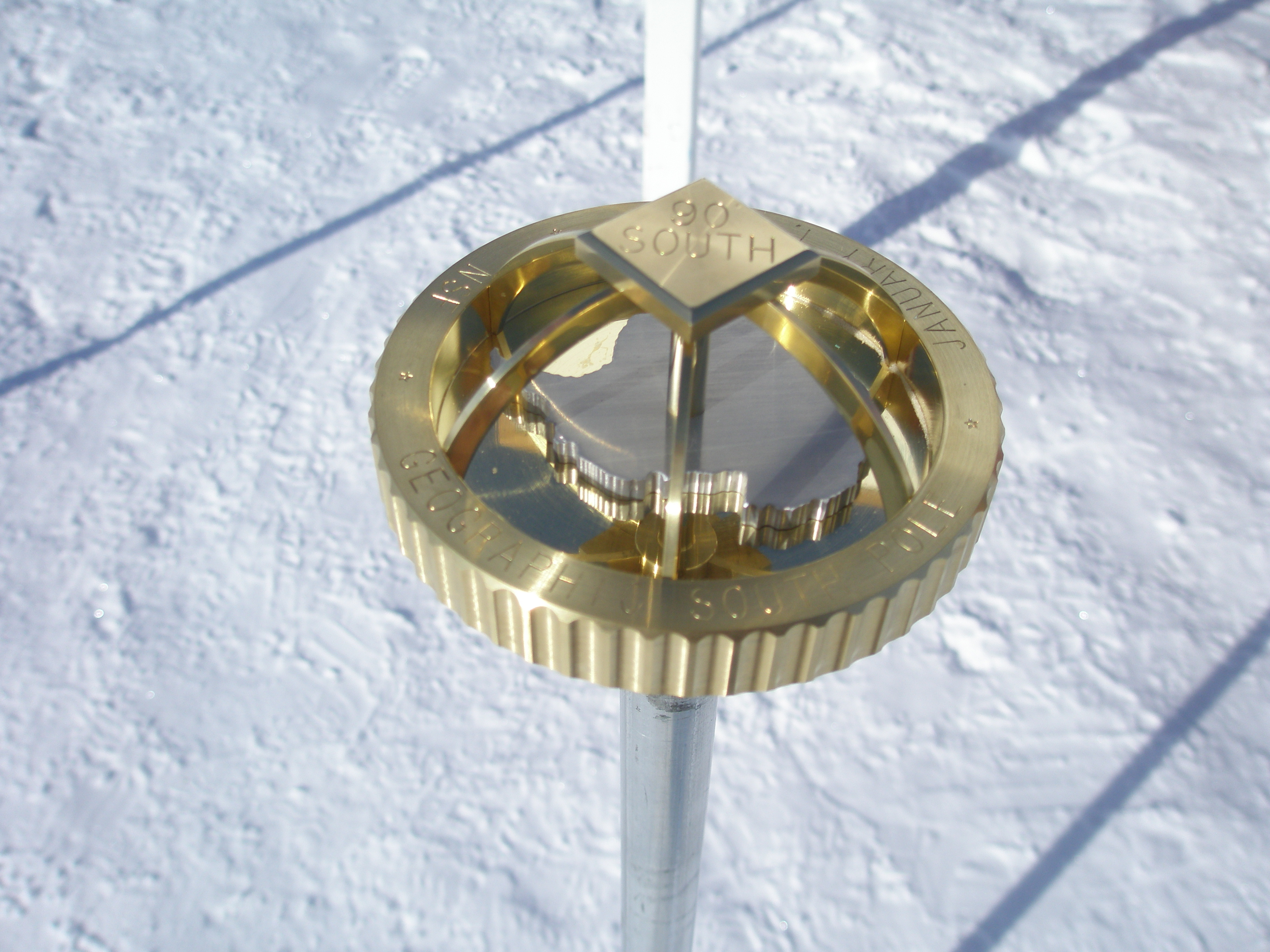
Geographic South Pole marker, 2008

For most purposes, the Geographic South Pole is defined as the southern point of the two points where Earth's axis of rotation intersects its surface (the other being the Geographic North Pole). However, Earth's axis of rotation is actually subject to very small "wobbles" (polar motion), so this definition is not adequate for very precise work.

The geographic coordinates of the South Pole are usually given simply as 90°S, since its longitude is geometrically undefined and irrelevant. When a longitude is desired, it may be given as 0°. At the South Pole, all directions face north. For this reason, directions at the Pole are given relative to "grid north", which points northward along the prime meridian. Along tight latitude circles, clockwise is east, and counterclockwise is west, opposite to the North Pole.

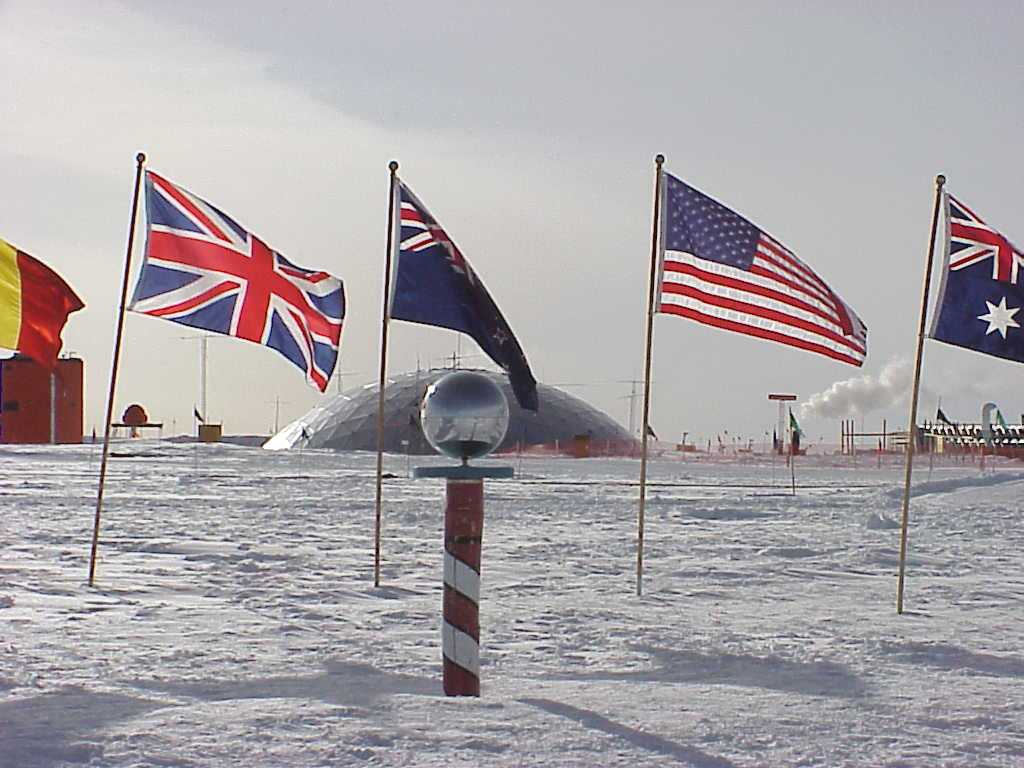
The Ceremonial South Pole in 1998.

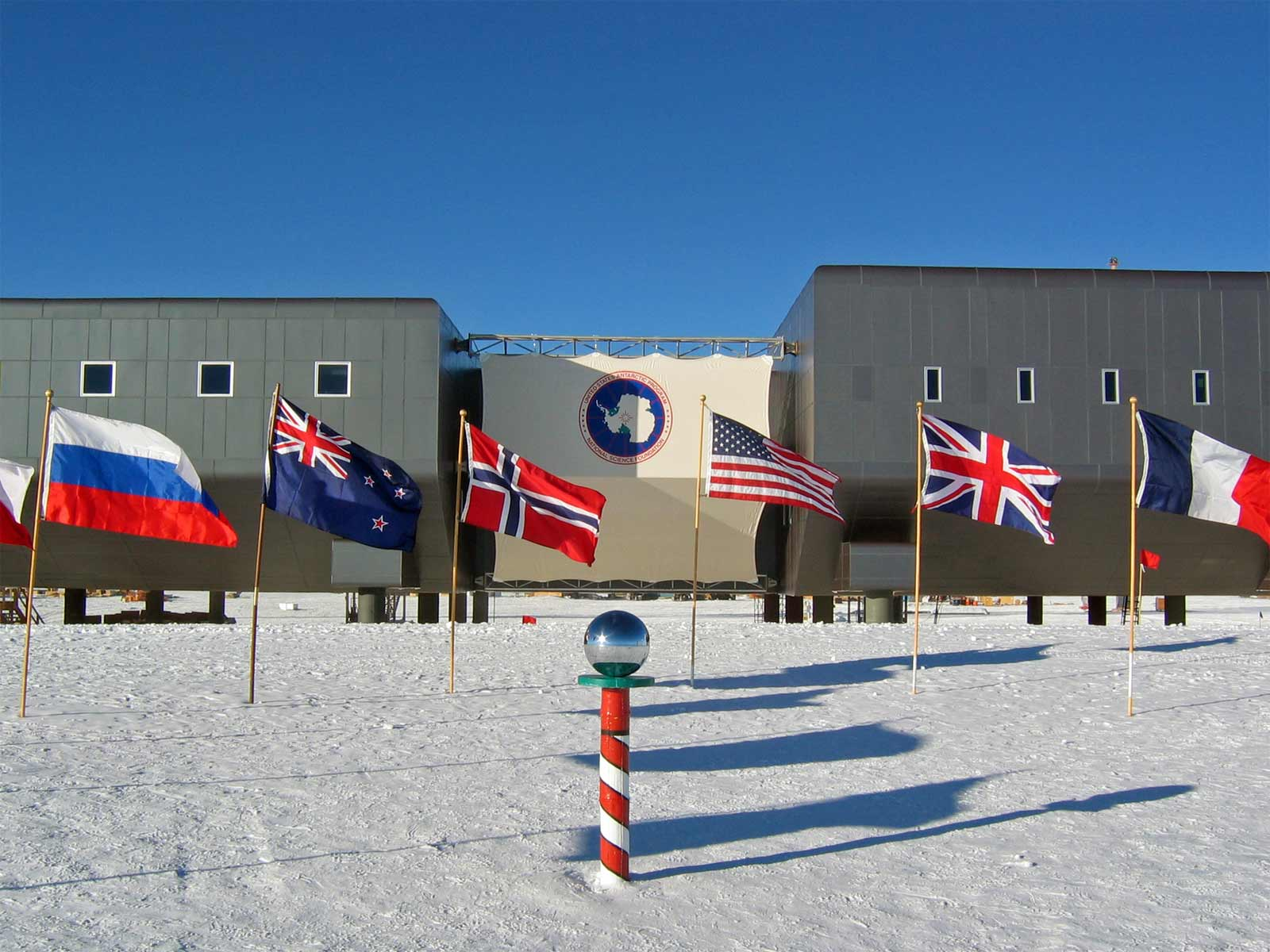
The Ceremonial South Pole as of February 2008.

The Geographic South Pole is located on the continent of Antarctica, although this has not been the case for all of Earth's history because of continental drift. It sits atop a featureless, barren, windswept and icy plateau at an altitude of 2,835 m (9,301 ft) above sea level, and is located about 1,300 km (810 mi) from the nearest open sea at the Bay of Whales. The ice is estimated to be about 2,700 m (8,900 ft) thick at the Pole, so the land surface under the ice sheet is actually near sea level.

The polar ice sheet is moving at a rate of roughly 10 m (33 ft) per year in a direction between 37° and 40° west of grid north, down towards the Weddell Sea. Therefore, the position of the station and other artificial features relative to the geographic pole gradually shift over time.

The Geographic South Pole is marked by a stake in the ice alongside a small sign; these are repositioned each year in a ceremony on New Year's Day to compensate for the movement of the ice. The sign records the respective dates that Roald Amundsen and Robert F. Scott reached the Pole, followed by a short quotation from each man, and gives the elevation as "9,301 FT.". A new marker stake is designed and fabricated each year by staff at the site.

=== Ceremonial South Pole ===
The Ceremonial South Pole is an area set aside for photo opportunities at the South Pole Station. It is located some meters from the Geographic South Pole, and consists of a metallic sphere on a short barber pole, surrounded by the flags of the original Antarctic Treaty signatory states.

=== Historic monuments ===
==== Amundsen's Tent ====
The tent was erected by the Norwegian expedition led by Roald Amundsen on its arrival on 14 December 1911. It is buried beneath the snow and ice in the vicinity of the Pole. It has been designated a Historic Site or Monument (HSM 80), following a proposal by Norway to the Antarctic Treaty Consultative Meeting. The precise location of the tent is unknown, but based on calculations of the rate of movement of the ice and the accumulation of snow, it is believed, as of 2010, to lie between 1.8 and 2.5 km (1.1 and 1.6 mi) from the Pole at a depth of 17 m (56 ft) below the existing surface.

==== Argentine flagpole ====
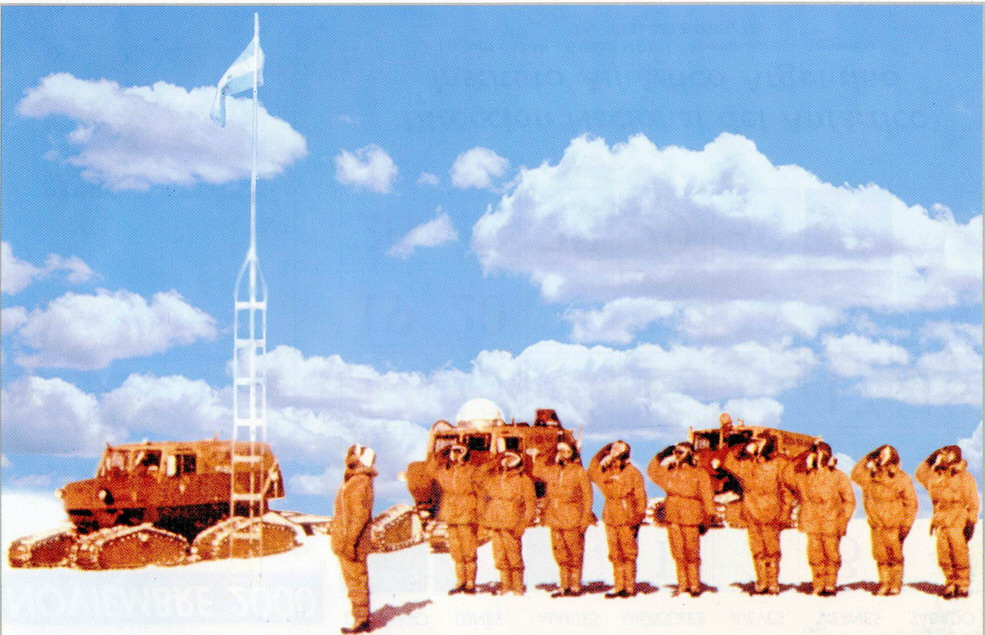
Argentinian soldiers saluting the flag after erecting the pole in 1965

A flagpole erected at the South Geographical Pole in December 1965 by the First Argentine Overland Polar Expedition has been designated a Historic Site or Monument (HSM 1) following a proposal by Argentina to the Antarctic Treaty Consultative Meeting.

== Exploration ==
=== Pre-1900 ===
In 1820, several expeditions claimed to have been the first to have sighted Antarctica, with the first being the Russian expedition led by Fabian Gottlieb von Bellingshausen and Mikhail Lazarev. The first landing was probably just over a year later when English-born American captain John Davis, a sealer, set foot on the ice.

The basic geography of the Antarctic coastline was not understood until the mid-to-late 19th century. American naval officer Charles Wilkes claimed (correctly) that Antarctica was a new continent, basing the claim on his exploration in 1839–1840, while James Clark Ross, in his expedition of 1839–1843, hoped that he might be able to sail all the way to the South Pole; he was unsuccessful.

=== 1900–1950 ===
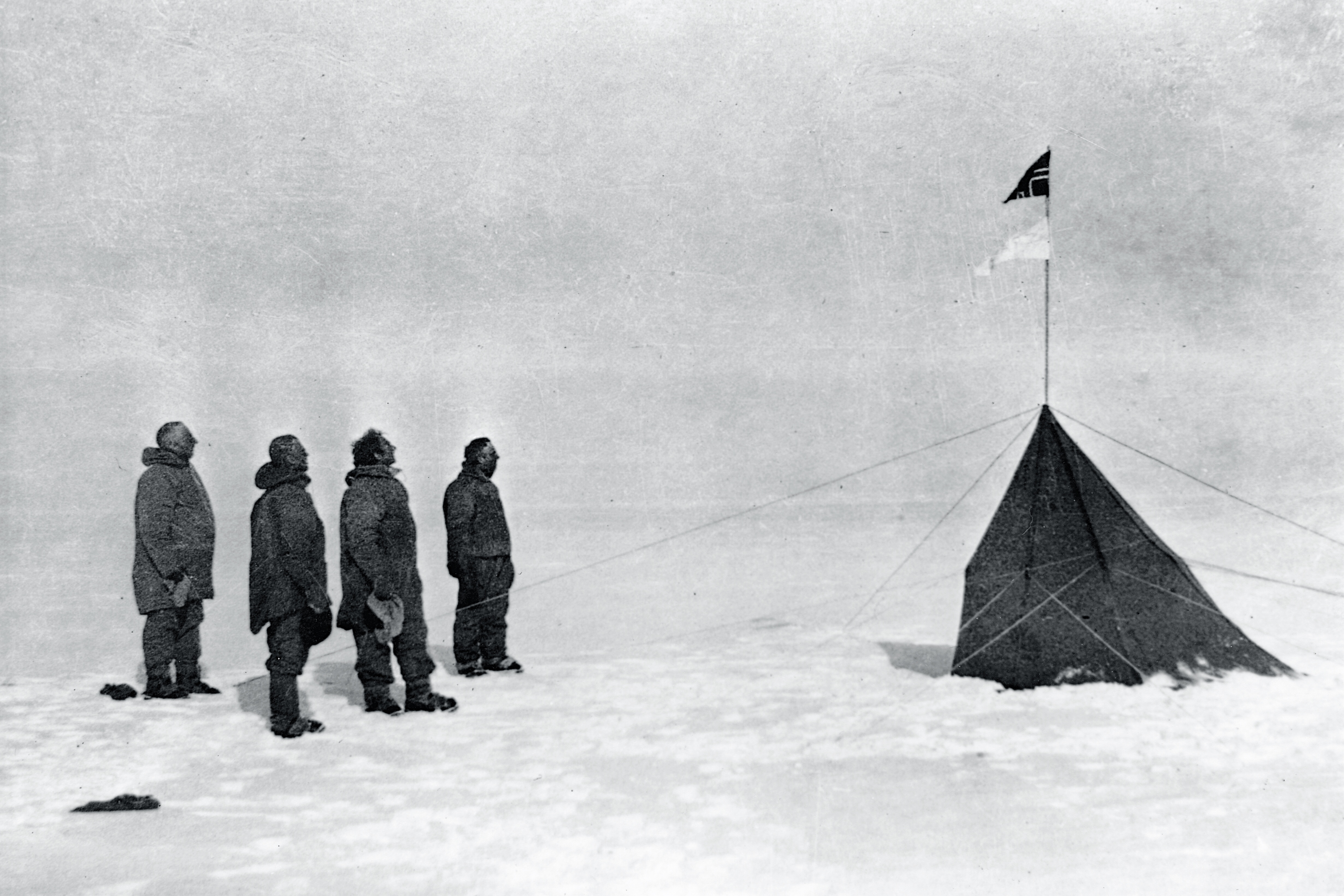
Amundsen's party at the South Pole, December 1911. From left to right: Amundsen, Hanssen, Hassel and Wisting (photo by fifth member Bjaaland).

British explorer Robert Falcon Scott on the Discovery Expedition of 1901–1904 was the first to attempt to find a route from the Antarctic coastline to the South Pole. Scott, accompanied by Ernest Shackleton and Edward Wilson, set out with the aim of travelling as far south as possible, and on 31 December 1902, reached 82°16′ S. Shackleton later returned to Antarctica as leader of the British Antarctic Expedition (Nimrod Expedition) in a bid to reach the Pole. On 9 January 1909, with three companions, he reached 88°23' S – 112 mi (180 km) from the Pole – before being forced to turn back.

The first men to reach the Geographic South Pole were the Norwegian Roald Amundsen and his party on 14 December 1911. Amundsen named his camp Polheim and the entire plateau surrounding the Pole King Haakon VII Vidde in honour of King Haakon VII of Norway. Robert Falcon Scott returned to Antarctica with his second expedition, the Terra Nova Expedition, initially unaware of Amundsen's secretive expedition. Scott and four other men reached the South Pole on 17 January 1912, thirty-four days after Amundsen. On the return trip, Scott and his four companions all died of starvation and extreme cold.

In 1914 Ernest Shackleton's Imperial Trans-Antarctic Expedition set out with the goal of crossing Antarctica via the South Pole, but his ship, the Endurance, was frozen in pack ice and sank 11 months later. The overland journey was never made.

US Admiral Richard Evelyn Byrd, with the assistance of his first pilot Bernt Balchen, became the first person to fly over the South Pole on 29 November 1929.

=== 1950–present ===
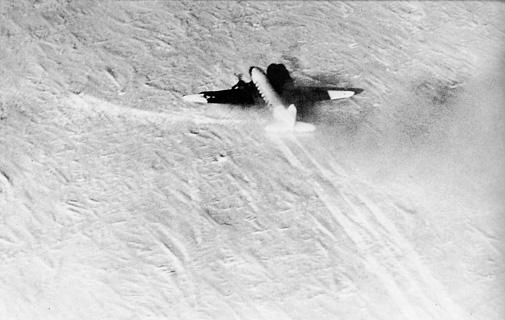
On 31 October 1956, a US Navy R4D-5L was the first aircraft to land at the South Pole, for Operation Deep Freeze II

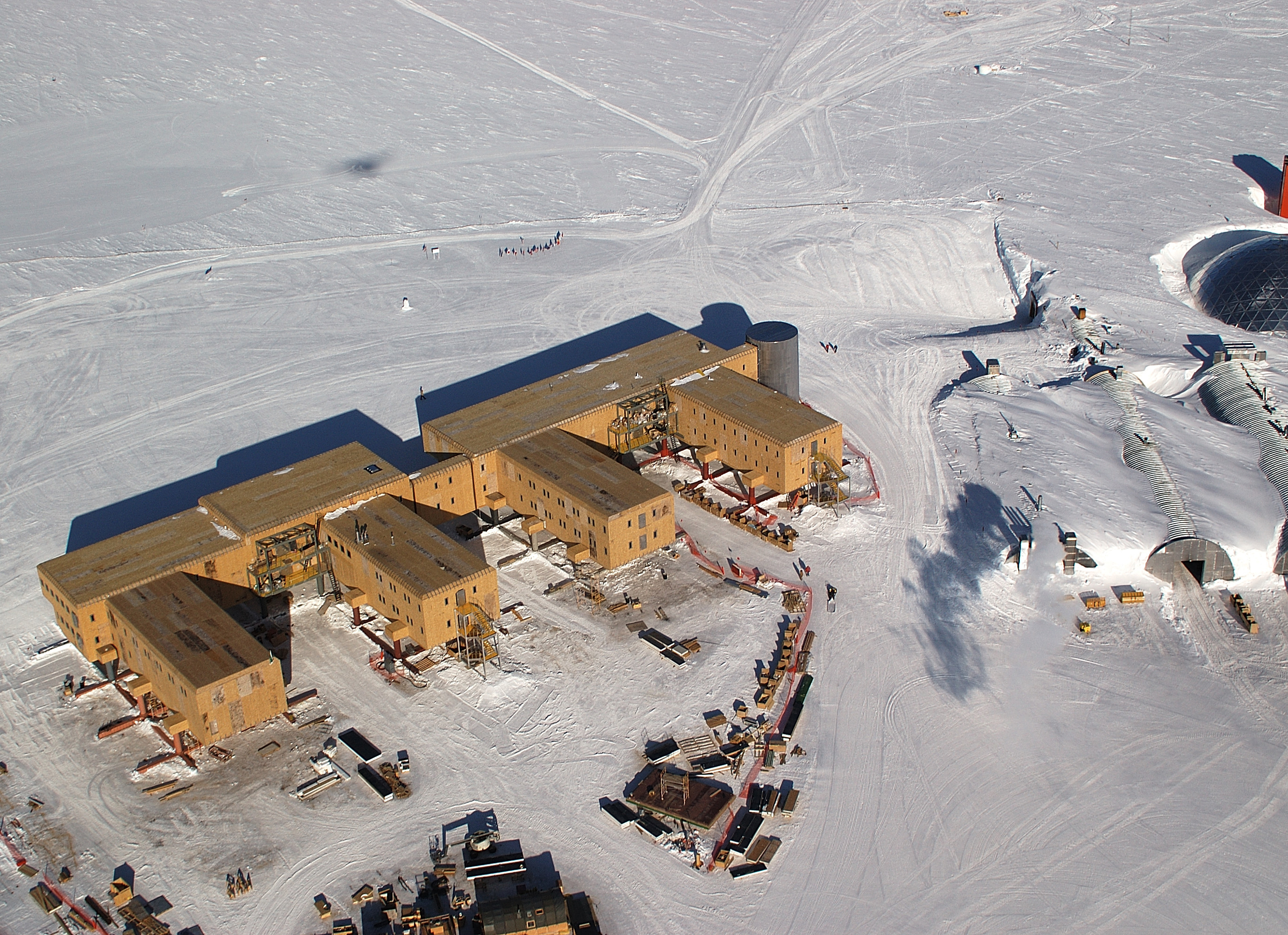
Amundsen–Scott South Pole Station. The ceremonial pole and flags can be seen in the background, slightly to the left of center, below the tracks behind the buildings. The actual geographic pole is a few more meters to the left. The buildings are raised on stilts to prevent snow build-up.

It was not until 31 October 1956 that humans once again set foot at the South Pole, when a party led by Admiral George J. Dufek of the US Navy landed there in a Douglas R4D-5L Skytrain aircraft. The US Amundsen–Scott South Pole Station was established by air over 1956–1957 for the International Geophysical Year and has been continuously staffed since then by research and support personnel.

After Amundsen and Scott, the next people to reach the South Pole overland, albeit with air support, were Edmund Hillary (4 January 1958) and Vivian Fuchs (19 January 1958) and their respective parties, during the Commonwealth Trans-Antarctic Expedition. There have been many subsequent expeditions to arrive at the South Pole by surface transportation, including those by Havola, Crary, and Fiennes. The first group of women to reach the pole were Pam Young, Jean Pearson, Lois Jones, Eileen McSaveney, Kay Lindsay, and Terry Tickhill in 1969. In 1979, Michele Eileen Raney became the first woman to winter at the South Pole; she had arrived at the beginning of Summer the previous year, thus becoming the first female physician to spend a year at the pole.

Subsequent to the establishment, in 1987, of the logistic support base at Patriot Hills Base Camp, the South Pole became more accessible to non-government expeditions.

In the summer of 1988–1989, Chilean glaciologist Alejo Contreras Steading reached the South Pole on foot; before that, he had arrived in 1980 by other means.

On 30 December 1989, Arved Fuchs and Reinhold Messner were the first to traverse Antarctica via the South Pole without animal or motorized help, using only skis and the help of wind. Two women, Victoria E. Murden and Shirley Metz, reached the pole by land on 17 January 1989.

The fastest unsupported journey to the Geographic South Pole from the ocean is 22 days, 6 hours and 8 minutes from Hercules Inlet and was set in 2024 by French polar explorer Vincent Colliard, who beat the previous solo record set in 2011 by Norwegian adventurer Christian Eide, and the one set in 2009 by American Todd Carmichael of 39 days and seven hours; and the previous group record, also set in 2009, of 33 days and 23 hours.

The fastest solo, unsupported and unassisted trek to the South Pole by a woman was achieved by Hannah McKeand from the UK in 2006. She made the journey in 39 days 9 hours 33 minutes. She started on 19 November 2006 and finished on 28 December.

On 6 January 2011, at age 79, Barbara Hillary became the first African-American woman on record to stand on the South Pole.

During the 2011–2012 summer, separate expeditions by Norwegian Aleksander Gamme and Australians James Castrission and Justin Jones jointly claimed the first unsupported trek without dogs or kites from the Antarctic coast to the South Pole and back. The two expeditions started from Hercules Inlet a day apart, with Gamme starting first, but completing according to plan the last few kilometers together. As Gamme traveled alone he thus simultaneously became the first to complete the task solo.

On 28 December 2018, Captain Lou Rudd became the first Briton to cross Antarctica unassisted via the South Pole, and the second person to make the journey in 56 days. In January 2025, Norwegian Karen Kyllesø became the youngest person to ski to the pole solo and unassisted. The record had previously been held since 7 January 2024 by Frenchman Pierre Hedan, aged 26, and earlier by Mollie Hughes who was 29 when, on 10 January 2020, she became the youngest person to ski to the pole.

== Climate and day and night ==
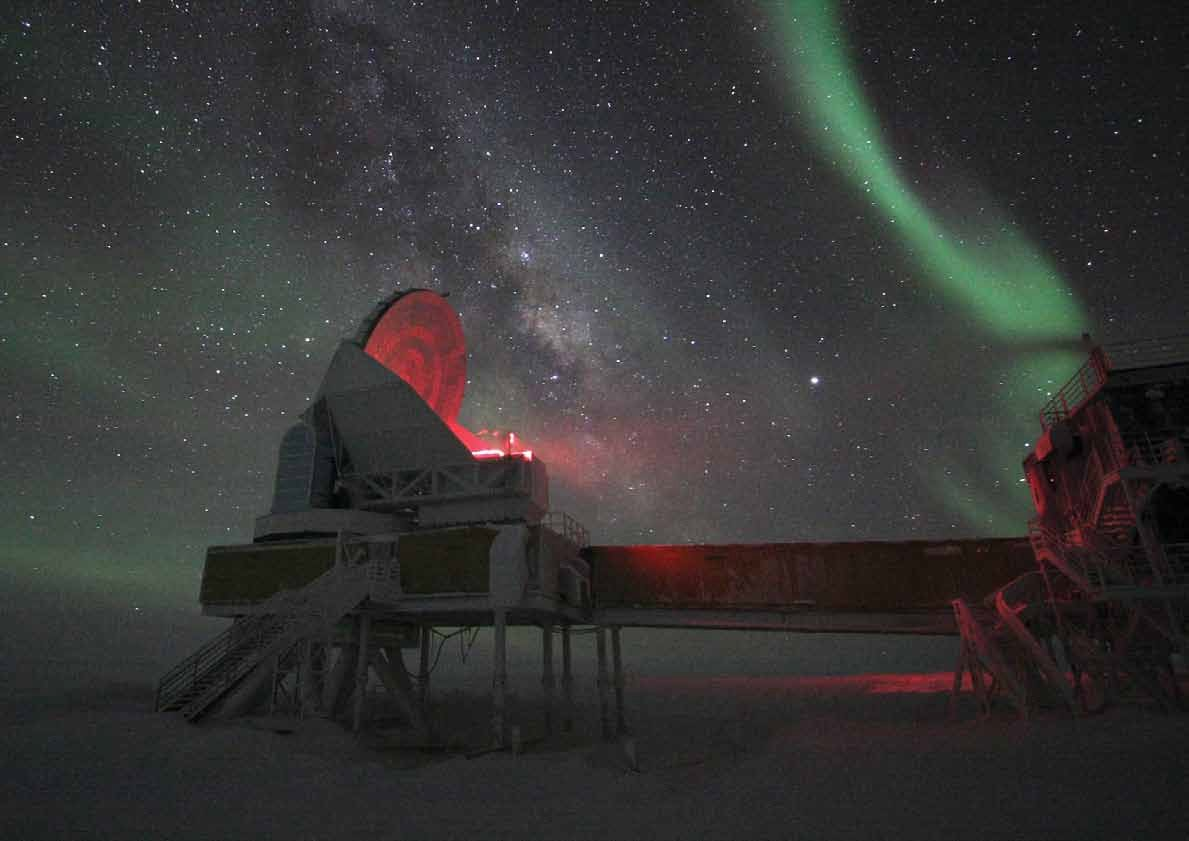
South Pole telescope during polar night. The green light is the southern lights

During winter (May through August), the South Pole receives no sunlight at all and is completely dark apart from moonlight. In summer (October through February), the Sun is continuously above the horizon and appears to move from right to left. However, it is always relatively low in the sky, reaching a maximum of approximately 23.5° around the December solstice because of the approximately 23.5° tilt of the earth's axis. Much of the sunlight that does reach the surface is reflected by the white snow. This lack of warmth from the Sun, combined with the high altitude of about 2,800 m (9,200 ft), means that the South Pole has one of the coldest climates on Earth (though it is not quite the coldest; that record goes to the region in the vicinity of the Vostok Station, also in Antarctica, which lies at a higher elevation).

The South Pole is at an altitude of 9,200 ft (2,800 m) but has an equivalent pressure altitude of 11,000 ft (3,400 m). This is because the scale height of the atmosphere is smaller at lower temperatures, meaning barometric pressure drops faster with height over the poles (compared to the Equator). The South Pole is colder than the North Pole primarily because of the elevation difference and for being in the middle of a continent. The North Pole is a few feet from sea level in the middle of an ocean.

In midsummer, as the Sun reaches its maximum elevation of about 23.5 degrees, high temperatures at the South Pole in January average at −25.9 °C (−15 °F). As the six-month "day" wears on and the Sun gets lower, temperatures drop as well: they reach −55 °C (−67 °F) around sunset (late March) and sunrise (late September). In midwinter, the average temperature remains steady at around −60 °C (−76 °F). The highest temperature ever recorded at the Amundsen–Scott South Pole Station was −12.3 °C (9.9 °F) on Christmas Day, 2011, and the lowest was −82.8 °C (−117.0 °F) on 23 June 1982 (for comparison, the lowest temperature directly recorded anywhere on earth was −89.2 °C (−128.6 °F) at Vostok Station on 21 July 1983, though −93.2 °C (−135.8 °F) was measured indirectly by satellite in East Antarctica between Dome A and Dome F in August 2010). Mean annual temperature at the South Pole is –49.5 °C (–57.1 °F).

The South Pole has an ice cap climate (Köppen climate classification EF). It resembles a desert, receiving very little precipitation. Air humidity is near zero. However, high winds can cause the blowing of snowfall, and the accumulation of snow amounts to about 7 cm (2.8 in) per year. The former dome seen in pictures of the Amundsen–Scott station is partially buried due to snow storms, and the entrance to the dome had to be regularly bulldozed to uncover it. More recent buildings are raised on stilts so that the snow does not build up against their sides.

Climate data for Amundsen–Scott South Pole Station
Month	Jan	Feb	Mar	Apr	May	Jun	Jul	Aug	Sep	Oct	Nov	Dec	Year
Record high °C (°F)	−12.7 (9.1)	−20.6 (−5.1)	−26.7 (−16.1)	−27.8 (−18.0)	−25.1 (−13.2)	−28.8 (−19.8)	−33.9 (−29.0)	−32.5 (−26.5)	−29.3 (−20.7)	−25.1 (−13.2)	−18.9 (−2.0)	−12.3 (9.9)	−12.3 (9.9)
Mean daily maximum °C (°F)	−26.0 (−14.8)	−37.9 (−36.2)	−49.6 (−57.3)	−53.0 (−63.4)	−53.6 (−64.5)	−54.5 (−66.1)	−55.2 (−67.4)	−54.9 (−66.8)	−54.4 (−65.9)	−48.4 (−55.1)	−36.2 (−33.2)	−26.3 (−15.3)	−45.8 (−50.4)
Daily mean °C (°F)	−28.4 (−19.1)	−40.9 (−41.6)	−53.7 (−64.7)	−57.8 (−72.0)	−58.0 (−72.4)	−58.9 (−74.0)	−59.8 (−75.6)	−59.7 (−75.5)	−59.1 (−74.4)	−51.6 (−60.9)	−38.2 (−36.8)	−28.0 (−18.4)	−49.5 (−57.1)
Mean daily minimum °C (°F)	−29.6 (−21.3)	−43.1 (−45.6)	−56.8 (−70.2)	−60.9 (−77.6)	−61.5 (−78.7)	−62.8 (−81.0)	−63.4 (−82.1)	−63.2 (−81.8)	−61.7 (−79.1)	−54.3 (−65.7)	−40.1 (−40.2)	−29.1 (−20.4)	−52.2 (−62.0)
Record low °C (°F)	−41.1 (−42.0)	−58.9 (−74.0)	−71.1 (−96.0)	−75.0 (−103.0)	−78.3 (−108.9)	−82.8 (−117.0)	−80.6 (−113.1)	−79.3 (−110.7)	−79.4 (−110.9)	−72.0 (−97.6)	−55.0 (−67.0)	−41.1 (−42.0)	−82.8 (−117.0)
Average precipitation mm (inches)	0.3 (0.01)	0.6 (0.02)	0.2 (0.01)	0.1 (0.00)	0.2 (0.01)	0.1 (0.00)	trace	trace	0.1 (0.00)	0.1 (0.00)	0.1 (0.00)	0.3 (0.01)	2.3 (0.09)
Average precipitation days (≥ 0.1 mm)	0.2	0.3	0.2	0.0	0.2	0.1	0.0	0.0	0.1	0.1	0.1	0.3	1.6
Average snowy days	22.0	19.6	13.6	11.4	17.2	17.3	18.2	17.5	11.7	16.7	16.9	20.6	203.0
Mean monthly sunshine hours	497.2	406.1	195.3	0.0	0.0	0.0	0.0	0.0	34.1	390.6	558.0	616.9	2,698.2
Mean daily sunshine hours	17.6	13.1	6.3	0.0	0.0	0.0	0.0	0.0	1.1	12.6	18.6	19.9	7.4
Source 1: Pogoda.ru.net (temperatures, 1981–2010, extremes 1957–present)
Source 2: Deutscher Wetterdienst (precipitation 1957–1988 and sun 1978–1993), NOAA (snowy days data, 1961–1988)

== Time ==
In most places on Earth, local time is determined by longitude, such that the time of day is more-or-less synchronised to the perceived position of the Sun in the sky (for example, at midday the Sun is roughly perceived to be at its highest). This line of reasoning fails at the South Pole, where the Sun is seen to rise and set only once per year with solar elevation varying only with day of the year, not time of day. There is no a priori reason for placing the South Pole in any particular time zone, but as a matter of practical convenience the Amundsen–Scott South Pole Station keeps New Zealand Time (UTC+12/UTC+13). This is because the US flies its resupply missions ("Operation Deep Freeze") out of McMurdo Station, which is supplied from Christchurch, New Zealand.

== Flora and fauna ==
Due to its exceptionally harsh climate, there are no native resident plants or animals at the South Pole. Off-course south polar skuas and snow petrels are occasionally seen there.

In 2000 it was reported that microbes had been detected living in the South Pole ice. Scientists published in the journal Gondwana Research that evidence had been found of dinosaurs with feathers to protect the animals from the extreme cold. The fossils had been found over 100 years ago in Koonwarra, Australia, but in sediment which had accumulated under a lake which had been near to the South Pole millions of years ago.

== See also ==
- List of Antarctic expeditions
- South Pole Telescope
- List of heads of government that have visited the South Pole
