= Blue ice (glacial) =

Form of ice formed under high pressure in a glacier

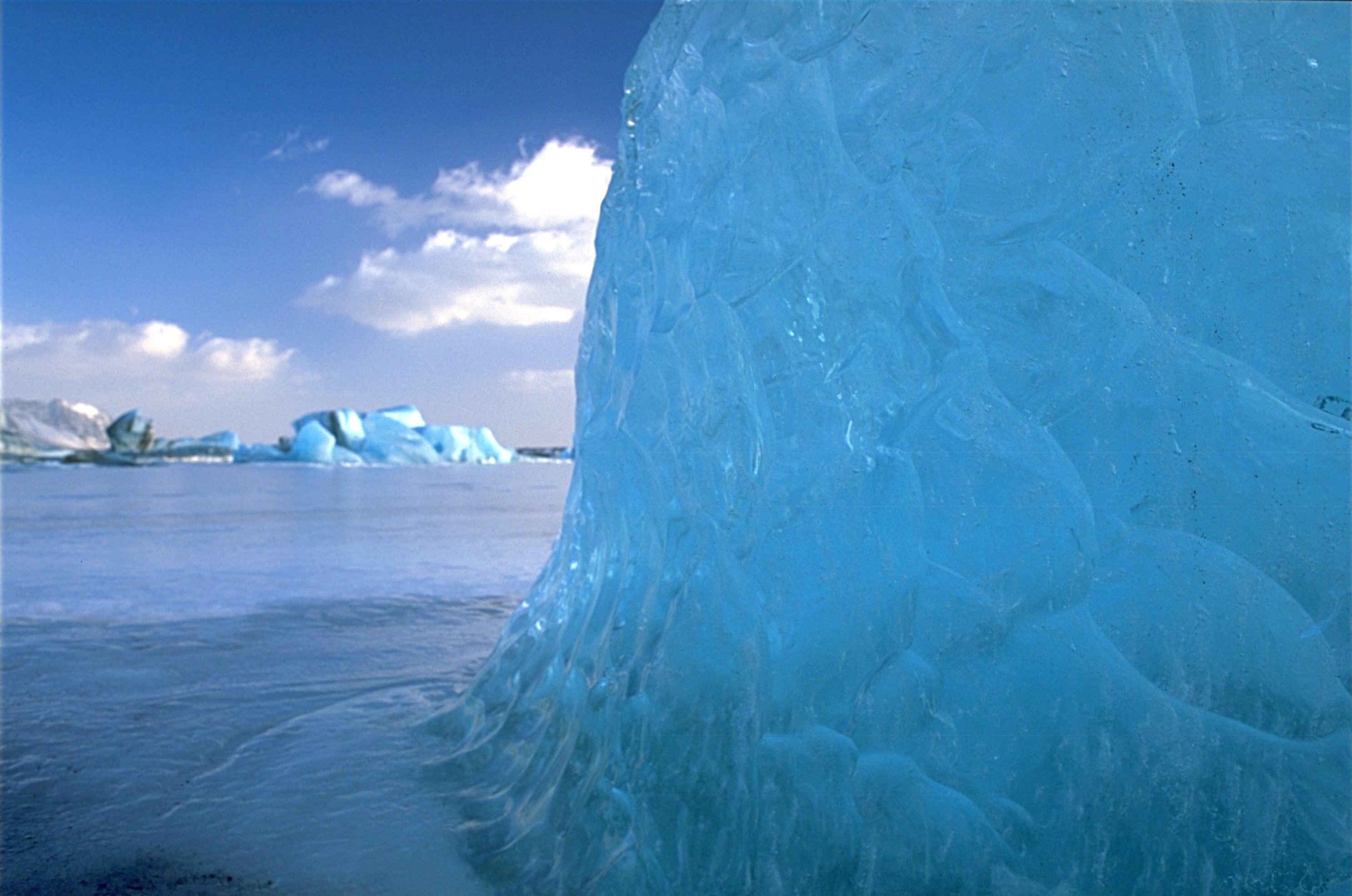
Iceberg on Jökulsárlón, Iceland

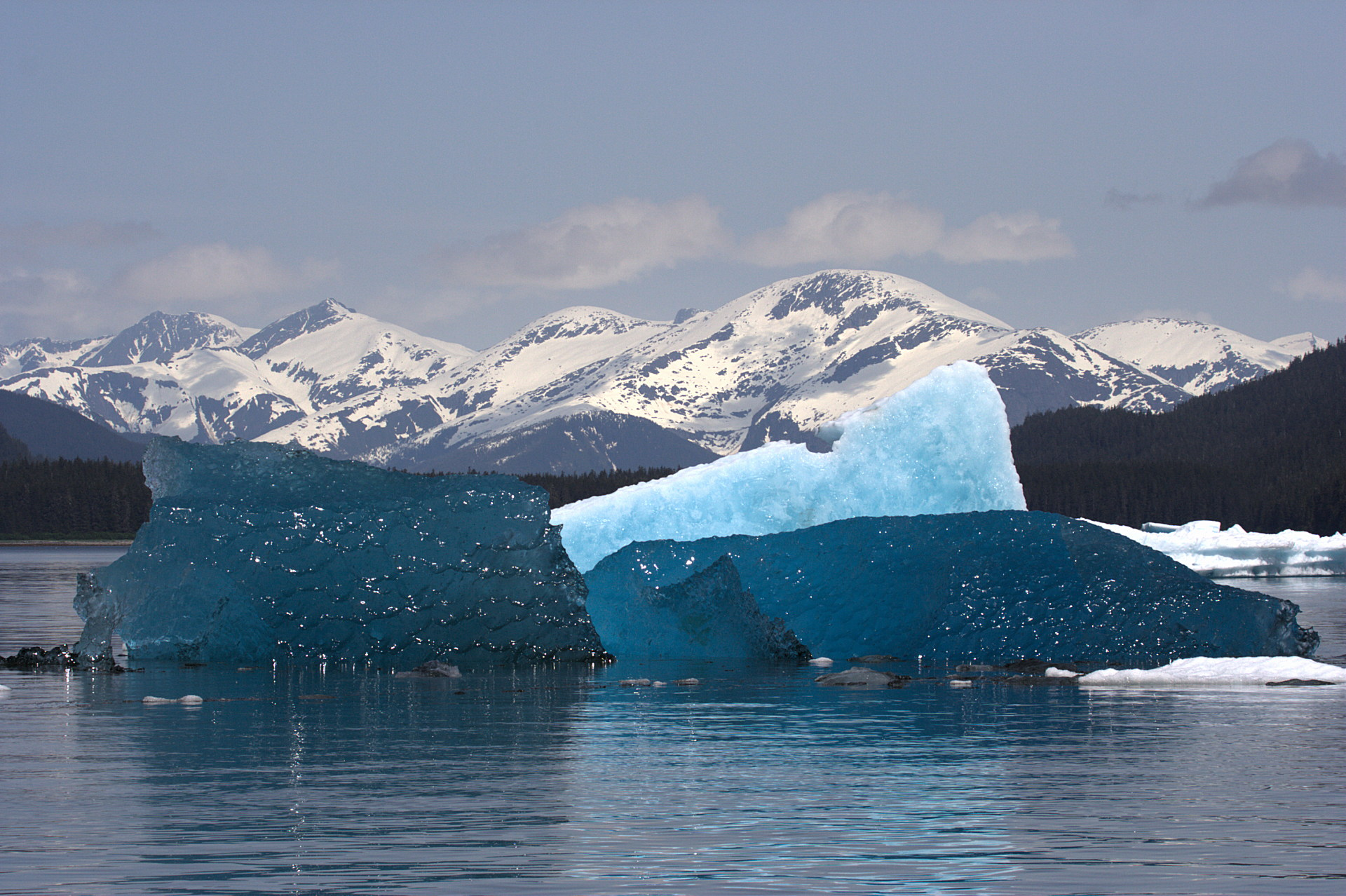
Glacial ice in Tracy Arm Fjord, Alaska, showing intense blue coloring

Blue ice is a form of ice that occurs in a glacier. It has been highly compressed by the weight of the overlying snow such that the ice crystals become enlarged. It is this enlargement that is responsible for the ice's blue color.

== Appearance ==
Small amounts of regular ice appear to be white because of air bubbles inside and also because small quantities of water appear to be colorless. In glaciers, the pressure causes the air bubbles to be squeezed out, increasing the density of the created ice. Water is blue in large quantities, as it absorbs other colors more efficiently than blue. A large piece of compressed ice, or a glacier, similarly appears blue. Under pressure, the ice crystals increase in size and so the path that light travels through the crystal gets longer, increasing the absorption of the red end of the spectrum and intensifying the blue color.

Once blue ice is exposed to warmer air, cracks and fissures appear in surface layers, and break up the large blue crystals of dense, pure ice. Within hours these air filled fissures cloud the surface making the ice appear white. The blue color will not be seen again until the ice breaks or turns over to expose ice which air could not reach. For example, tourists at Tasman Glacier, New Zealand in January 2011 saw an iceberg roll over to reveal startling blue ice, kept from air by staying underwater for months since the iceberg calved.

== Rayleigh scattering ==
The blue color is sometimes wrongly attributed to Rayleigh scattering, which is responsible for the color of the sky. Rather, water ice is blue for the same reason that large quantities of liquid water are blue: it is a result of an overtone of an oxygen–hydrogen (O−H) bond stretch in water, which absorbs light at the red end of the visible spectrum. So, water owes its intrinsic blueness (as seen after > 3 meters of penetration) to selective absorption in the red part of its visible spectrum. The absorbed photons drive vibrational (normally infrared) transitions.

== Antarctic runways ==
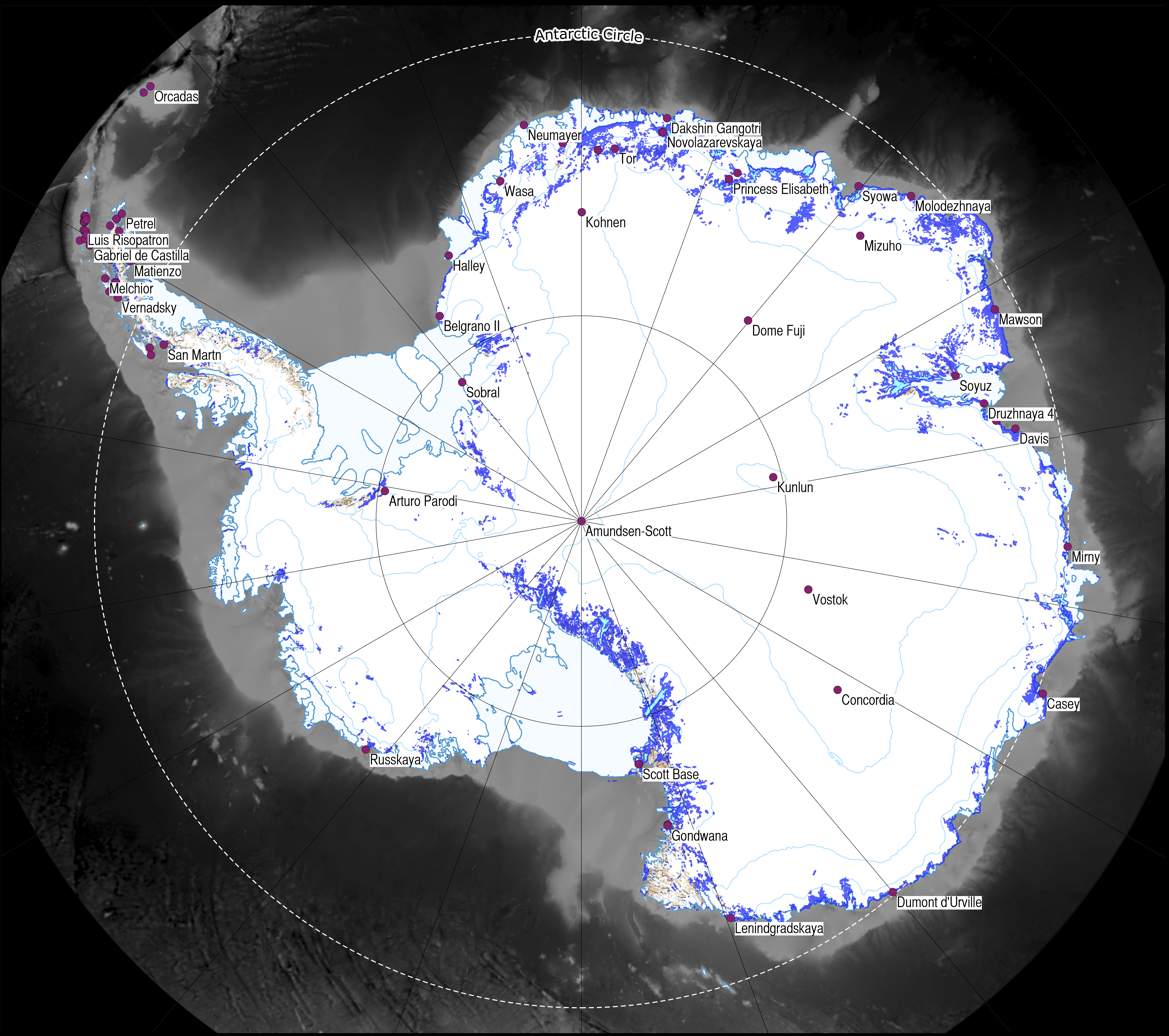
Blue ice fields in Antarctica

Blue ice is exposed in areas of the Antarctic where there is no net addition or subtraction of snow. That is, any snow that falls in that area is counteracted by sublimation or other losses. Such areas are known as blue-ice areas. These areas have been used as blue ice runways (e.g. Wilkins Runway, Novolazarevskaya, Patriot Hills Base Camp) due to their hard surface, which is suitable for aircraft fitted with wheels rather than skis.
