= Canyons of the Teton Range =

Canyons in Wyoming, United States

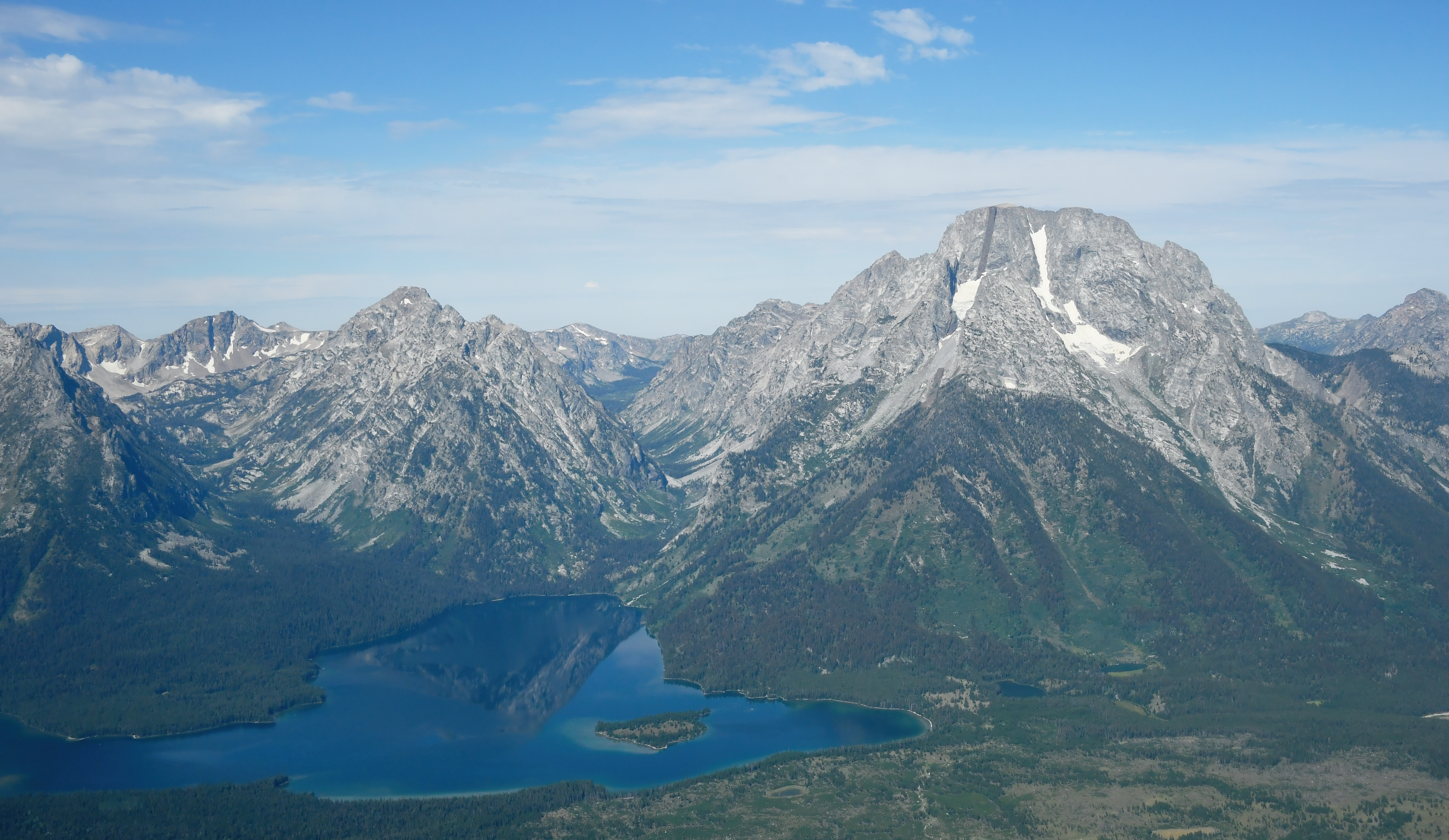
Paintbrush Canyon at left and Leigh Canyon at center in the Teton Range

The canyons of the Teton Range lie almost entirely within Grand Teton National Park in the U.S. state of Wyoming. Ranging from 9 miles (14 km) to less than 1 mile (1.6 km) in length and up to 6,000 feet (1,800 m) deep, the canyons were carved primarily by glaciers over the past 250,000 years. The canyons in the Teton Range descend in altitude generally west to east and many have lakes at their outlets. The lakes were created by terminal moraines left behind by the now retreated glaciers. A few of the canyons have small glaciers that were created mostly during the Little Ice Age (1550-1850). Fast retreating Schoolroom Glacier is a tiny glacier located at the head of the South Cascade Canyon. Most of the canyons have streams from which rain and snowmelt flow towards Jackson Hole valley, and due to the sometimes rapid altitude descent, waterfalls are common. The canyons offer the easiest hiking access into the Teton Range.

== Teton Range canyons within Grand Teton National Park ==
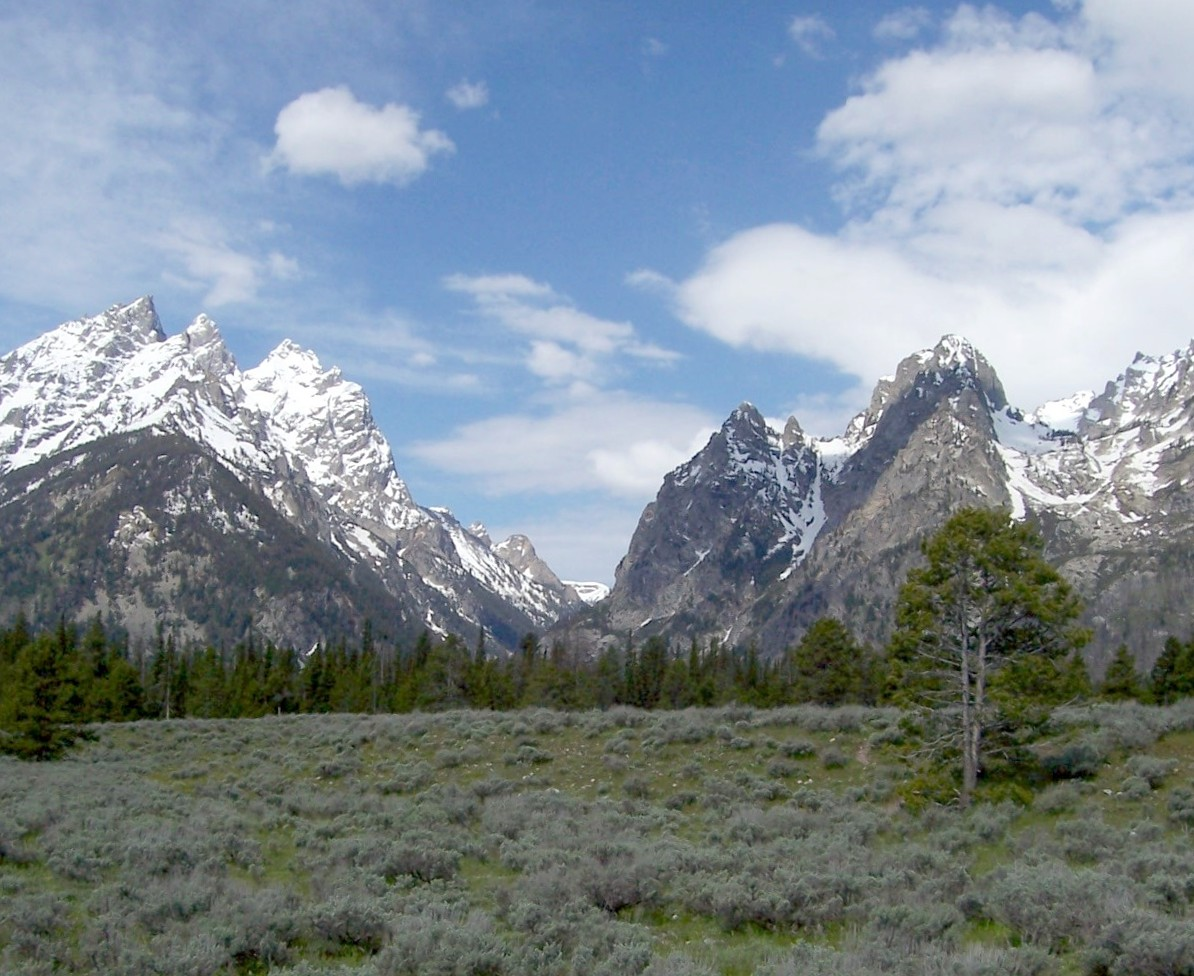
Cascade Canyon with the Cathedral Group at left and Symmetry Spire at right

- Webb Canyon is 9 miles (14 km) long and originates at several alpine lakes near the western boundary of Grand Teton National Park. Moose Creek flows through the canyon and empties into Jackson Lake.
- Colter Canyon is 3 miles (4.8 km) long and originates north of Ranger Peak.
- Waterfalls Canyon is 3 miles (4.8 km) long. Several cascades near the head of the canyon descend from an unnamed lake.
- Snowshoe Canyon has a north and south fork. This 5 miles (8.0 km) long canyon lies between Eagles Rest Peak and Rolling Thunder Mountain to the north and Raynolds Peak, Traverse Peak and Bivouac Peak to the south.
- Moran Canyon is 6 miles (9.7 km) long and is situated south of Raynolds Peak, Traverse Peak and Bivouac Peak and north of Mount Moran. The canyon outlet is at Moran Bay on Jackson Lake.
- Leigh Canyon is 6 miles (9.7 km) long and lies between Mount Moran to the north and Mount Woodring to the south. The canyon outlet is at Leigh Lake.
- Paintbrush Canyon is 3 miles (4.8 km) long and the canyon outlet is near Leigh Lake. The popular but very strenuous Paintbrush-Cascade Loop hike traverses through the canyon.
- Hanging Canyon is a 2 miles (3.2 km) long canyon which is immediately south of Mount Saint John.
- Cascade Canyon is 7 miles (11 km) long and splits into the North Cascade and South Cascade canyons 4 miles (6.4 km) from its outlet at Jenny Lake. The canyon is more than 6,000 feet (1,800 m) deep in places as the north slopes of Mount Owen and Grand Teton tower above the canyon. One of the most visited canyons in Grand Teton National Park, Cascade Canyon can be accessed by trail via a loop hike around Jenny Lake or a boat shuttle which provides easier access to Inspiration Point and the nearly 200 feet (61 m) cascade known as Hidden Falls. Schoolroom Glacier is located at the head of the South Cascade Canyon while Lake Solitude lies at the end of the North Cascade Canyon.
- Valhalla Canyon extends northward 1.5 miles (2.4 km) from the northwestern slopes of Grand Teton and ends within Cascade Canyon.

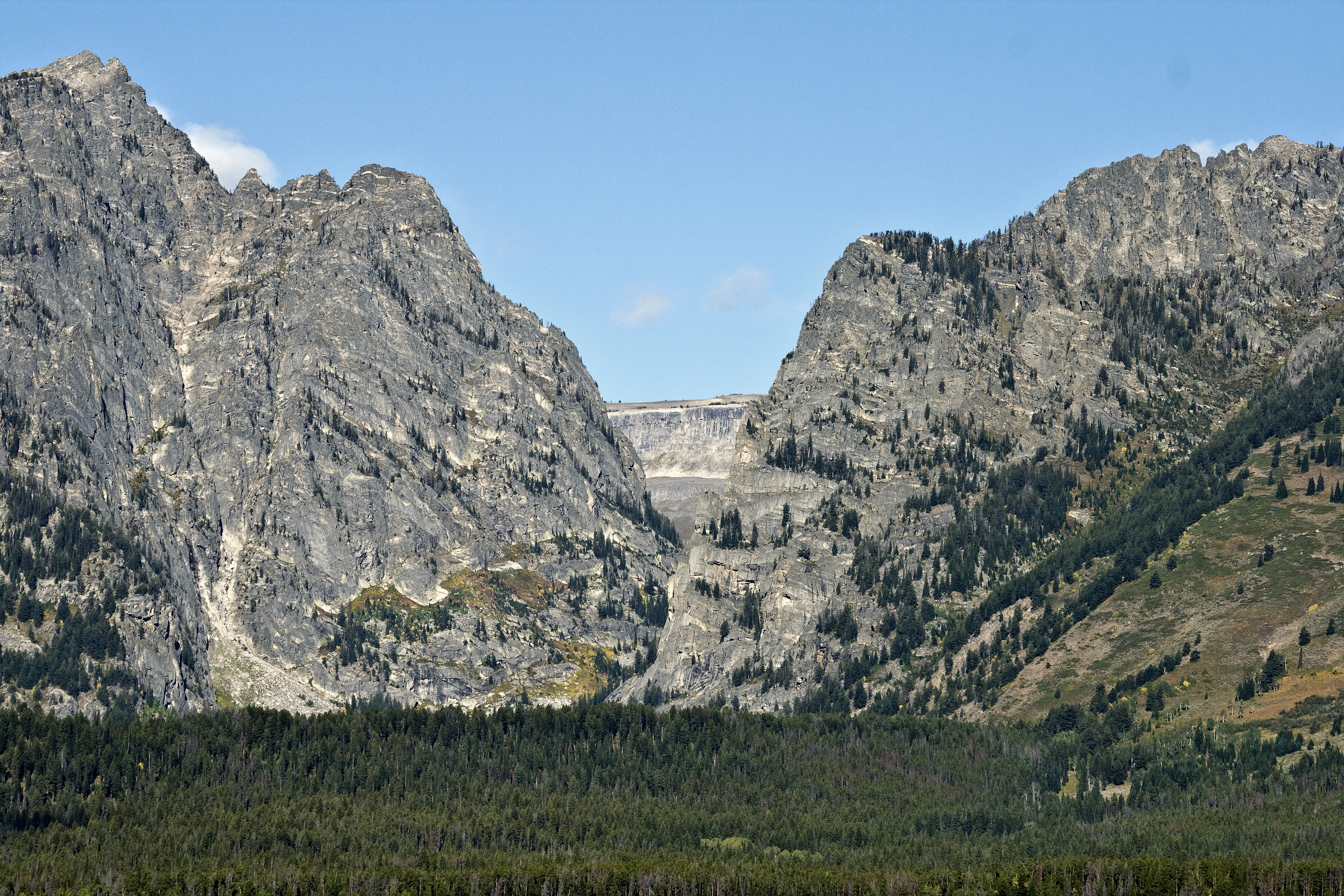
Death Canyon

- Garnet Canyon is 2.5 miles (4.0 km) long and is the most commonly used canyon by mountaineers to access the upper slopes of Grand Teton, Middle Teton and other peaks of the Cathedral Group. The terminal moraine at the outlet of Garnet Canyon impounds Bradley Lake.
- Avalanche Canyon is 2.5 miles (4.0 km) long. Both Snowdrift Lake and Lake Taminah are within the canyon. South Teton and Cloudveil Dome are to the north and Mount Wister is to the south of the canyon. The terminal moraine at the outlet of Avalanche Canyon impounds Taggart Lake.
- Death Canyon is a popular hiking destination. More than 6 miles (9.7 km) long, the canyon provides access from Phelps Lake to the Teton backcountry region.
- Open Canyon is 2.5 miles (4.0 km) long and extends from Mount Hunt to Phelps Lake.
- Granite Canyon is the southernmost canyon in Grand Teton National Park. Granite Canyon is almost 6 miles (9.7 km) long and is flanked to the south by Rendezvous Mountain.

== Teton Range canyons outside Grand Teton National Park ==
- Jensen Canyon is located to the south of Grand Teton National Park in Bridger-Teton National Forest.
- Phillips Canyon is located to the south of Grand Teton National Park in Bridger-Teton National Forest.
- Teton Canyon is on the west slopes of the Teton Range and within Caribou-Targhee National Forest.
- Darby Canyon is on the west slopes of the Teton Range and within Caribou-Targhee National Forest.

== See also ==
- Geology of the Grand Teton area
