= Windy =

Windy may refer to:

== Music ==
- Windy (album), a 1968 album by Astrud Gilberto
- Windy (EP), a 2021 extended play by Jeon So-yeon
- "Windy" (song), 1967
- "Windy", 2014 song by Scarlet Pleasure

== People and fictional characters ==
- Windy (comics), a Walter Lantz cartoon character
- Windy (nickname), a list of people
- Cure Windy (a.k.a. Mai Mishou), protagonist of Futari wa Pretty Cure Splash Star
- Emerson Windy, 21st century American hip hopper
- Windy Miller, a character in Camberwick Green, a British 1966 children's television series
- Windy Weber, American musician in the duo Windy & Carl

== Places ==
- Windy, West Virginia, United States, an unincorporated community
- Windy Hill (disambiguation)
- Windy Lake, a list of lakes in Ontario, Canada
- Windy Pass (disambiguation), various mountain passes in the United States and one in Canada
- Windy Peak (disambiguation), various mountain summits in the United States, and one each in Canada and Antarctica
- Windy Point (disambiguation)
- Windy Range, British Columbia, Canada, a mountain range
- Windy Run, Arlington County, Virginia, United States, a stream

== Other uses ==
- Windy (dinghy), a class of dinghy
- Windy (weather service), an interactive weather forecasting service
- Radio Windy, or Windy FM, a defunct radio station in Wellington, New Zealand
- West Indies cricket team, or the Windies

== See also ==
- Wind (disambiguation)
- Zheltau (disambiguation) (Kazakh: Windy Mountain)
