= Columbine Cascade (Teton County, Wyoming) =

Waterfall in the United States

- Location within Wyoming
- Location: Grand Teton National Park, United States
- Coordinates: 43.916602°N 110.74938°W
- Type: Cascade
- Total height: 250 feet (76 m)
- Watercourse: Intermittent stream

Columbine Cascade is a waterfall in Waterfalls Canyon, a part of the Grand Teton National Park in the U.S. state of Wyoming. The cascade drops approximately 250 feet (76 m) in Hanging Canyon, fed by an unnamed intermittent stream off a glacial lake. The waterfall also receives snowmelt from Ranger Peak to the north Doane Peak to the southwest and Eagles Rest Peak to the south. Less than .5 miles (0.80 km) upstream, the same unnamed creek flows over another steep section known as Wilderness Falls The peak time for waterflow is during spring snowmelt and the falls are visible across Jackson Lake from the Colter Bay Village area.
