= Open Canyon Trail =

Hiking trail in Wyoming, United States

Coordinates: 43°37′59″N 110°51′05″W

- Length: 8.3 mi (13.4 km)
- Location: Teton Range
- Trailheads: Valley Trail; Granite Canyon Trail
- Use: Hiking
- Elevation change: Approximate gain of 2,500 ft (760 m)
- Highest point: Mount Hunt Divide, 9,698 ft (2,956 m)
- Lowest point: Valley Trail, 7,200 ft (2,200 m)
- Difficulty: Strenuous
- Season: Summer to Fall
- Sights: Teton Range
- Hazards: Severe weather

The Open Canyon Trail is a 8.3 mi (13.4 km) long hiking trail in Grand Teton National Park in the U.S. state of Wyoming. The trail begins at a junction with the Valley Trail and is most easily accessed with a 3 mi (4.8 km) hike on the Valley Trail from the trailhead near the White Grass Ranger Station Historic District. From there the trail heads west from Phelps Lake to Mount Hunt Divide and then descends into Granite Canyon. The trail traverses the entire length of Open Canyon. Indian Lake and Coyote Lake as well as Mount Hunt can also be reached from the trail but each require off trail navigation to access. There are two different camping zones in the canyon which are available by permit.

== See also ==
- List of hiking trails in Grand Teton National Park
