= Windy Pass =

Windy Pass may refer to:

- Windy Pass (Alberta–British Columbia), a pass on the Alberta–British Columbia border, Canada
- Windy Pass (Yukon), a pass in the Ogilivie Mountains, Yukon, Canada, the origin of 3 specimens of Lasionycta skraelingia moths
- Windy Pass (Alaska), a pass in the Alaska Range, United States
- Windy Pass (Mineral County, Colorado), United States
- Windy Pass (Gallatin County, Montana), a mountain pass in Gallatin County, Montana, United States
- Windy Pass (Lincoln County, Montana), a mountain pass in Lincoln County, Montana, United States
- Windy Pass (Madison County, Montana), a mountain pass in Madison County, Montana, United States
- Windy Pass (Powell County, Montana), a mountain pass in Powell County, Montana, United States
- Windy Pass (Harney County, Oregon), a pass in Harney County, Oregon, United States
- Windy Pass (Lane County, Oregon), a pass in Lane County, Oregon, United States
- Windy Pass (Utah), a pass in Utah County, Utah, United States
- Windy Pass (Alpine Lakes), Alpine Lakes Wilderness, Washington, United States
- Windy Pass (Skamania County, Washington), a pass along Windy Ridge near Mount St. Helens
- Ballaghgee Glebe, a townland in County Fermanagh, Northern Ireland, from Irish Bealach Gaoíthe, meaning 'windy pass'
- Ballengeich, the name of a road under Stirling Castle, meaning "windy pass" in Gaelic
- Compton Wynyates (parish), a civil parish in Stratford-on-Avon District, Warwickshire, England, meaning "windy pass settlement"

== See also ==
- Windy (disambiguation)
- Windy Gap (disambiguation)
- Windy Peak (disambiguation)
- Windy Point (disambiguation)
- Windy Saddle (disambiguation)
- List of mountain passes
