= Smith Ridge =

Smith Ridge (79°7′S 86°32′W) is a ridge 4 nautical miles (7 km) long, lying 1 nautical mile (1.9 km) west of Frazier Ridge in the Founders Peaks, Heritage Range in Antarctica. Named by the University of Minnesota Geological Party to these mountains, 1963–64, for Carl W. Smith who served that season as helicopter engine technical representative with the 62nd Transportation Detachment.

== Features ==
Geographical features include:

- Pardue Peak
