= Wilderness Falls (Teton County, Wyoming) =

- Location within Wyoming
- Location: Grand Teton National Park, United States
- Coordinates: 43.91622°N 110.758701°W
- Type: Cascade
- Total height: 250 feet (76 m)
- Watercourse: Intermittent stream

Wilderness Falls is located in Waterfalls Canyon, Grand Teton National Park in the U.S. state of Wyoming. The cascade drops approximately 250 feet (76 m) in Waterfalls Canyon, fed by unnamed intermittent stream off a glacial lake. The waterfall also receives snowmelt from Ranger Peak to the north and Doane Peak to the southwest. Less than .5 miles (0.80 km) downstream, the same unnamed creek flows over another steep section known as Columbine Cascade The peak time for waterflow is during spring snowmelt and the falls are visible across Jackson Lake from the Colter Bay Village area.
