= Webb Canyon =

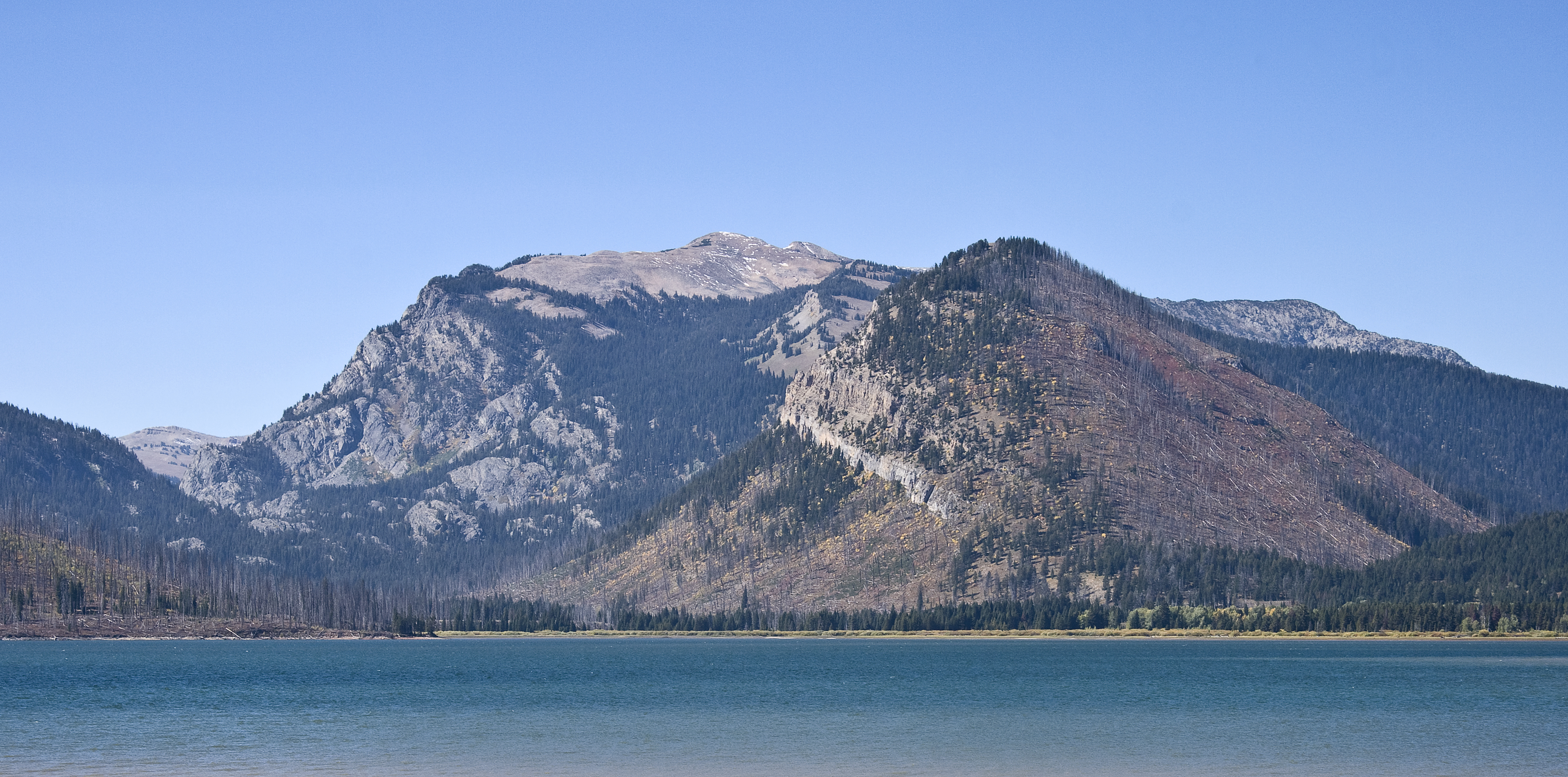
- View of Webb Canyon at left from east shore of Jackson Lake. Owl Peak is the highest summit on the right.

Geography
- Country: United States
- State: Wyoming
- County: Teton
- Coordinates: 43°59′10″N 110°43′28″W
- Lake: Jackson Lake
- Interactive map of Webb Canyon

Webb Canyon is located in Grand Teton National Park, in the U. S. state of Wyoming. The canyon was formed by glaciers which retreated at the end of the Last Glacial Maximum approximately 15,000 years ago, leaving behind a U-shaped valley. Webb Canyon is south of Owl Peak and the entrance to the canyon is near the northern reaches of Jackson Lake. Moose Creek flows through much of the 9 miles (14 km) long canyon and the Webb Canyon Trail traverses the length of the canyon to Moose Basin Divide.

== See also ==
- Canyons of the Teton Range
- Geology of the Grand Teton area
