= Webb Canyon Trail =

Hiking trail in Wyoming, United States

Coordinates: 43°59′05″N 110°44′04″W

- Length: 9.9 mi (15.9 km)
- Location: Teton Range
- Trailheads: Wilcox Point; Moose Basin Divide
- Use: Hiking/Pack animals
- Elevation change: Approximate gain of 2,900 ft (880 m)
- Highest point: Moose Basin Divide, 9,718 ft (2,962 m)
- Lowest point: Near Jackson Lake, 6,800 ft (2,100 m)
- Difficulty: Strenuous
- Season: Summer to Fall
- Sights: Teton Range
- Hazards: Severe weather Grizzly bears Stream crossings

The Webb Canyon Trail is a 9.9-mile (15.9 km) long hiking trail in the far northern region of Grand Teton National Park in the U.S. state of Wyoming. The trail begins near the National Park Service backcountry patrol cabin near Wilcox Point on Jackson Lake. Located in the remote northern backcountry of Grand Teton National Park, the trail is not connected to maintained trails in the southern part of the park and must be accessed from the Glade Creek trailhead in the John D. Rockefeller, Jr. Memorial Parkway. From Glade Creek, it is a 7.5 mi (12.1 km) hike to the patrol cabin and the beginning of the Webb Canyon Trail. The trail follows Moose Creek west and after several miles, is flanked by both Owl Peak and Elk Mountain to the north and several unnamed peaks nearing 11,000 ft (3,400 m) to the south. At Moose Basin Divide the trail meets the Owl Creek Trail.

== See also ==
List of hiking trails in Grand Teton National Park
