= Open Canyon =

Canyon in Wyoming, USA

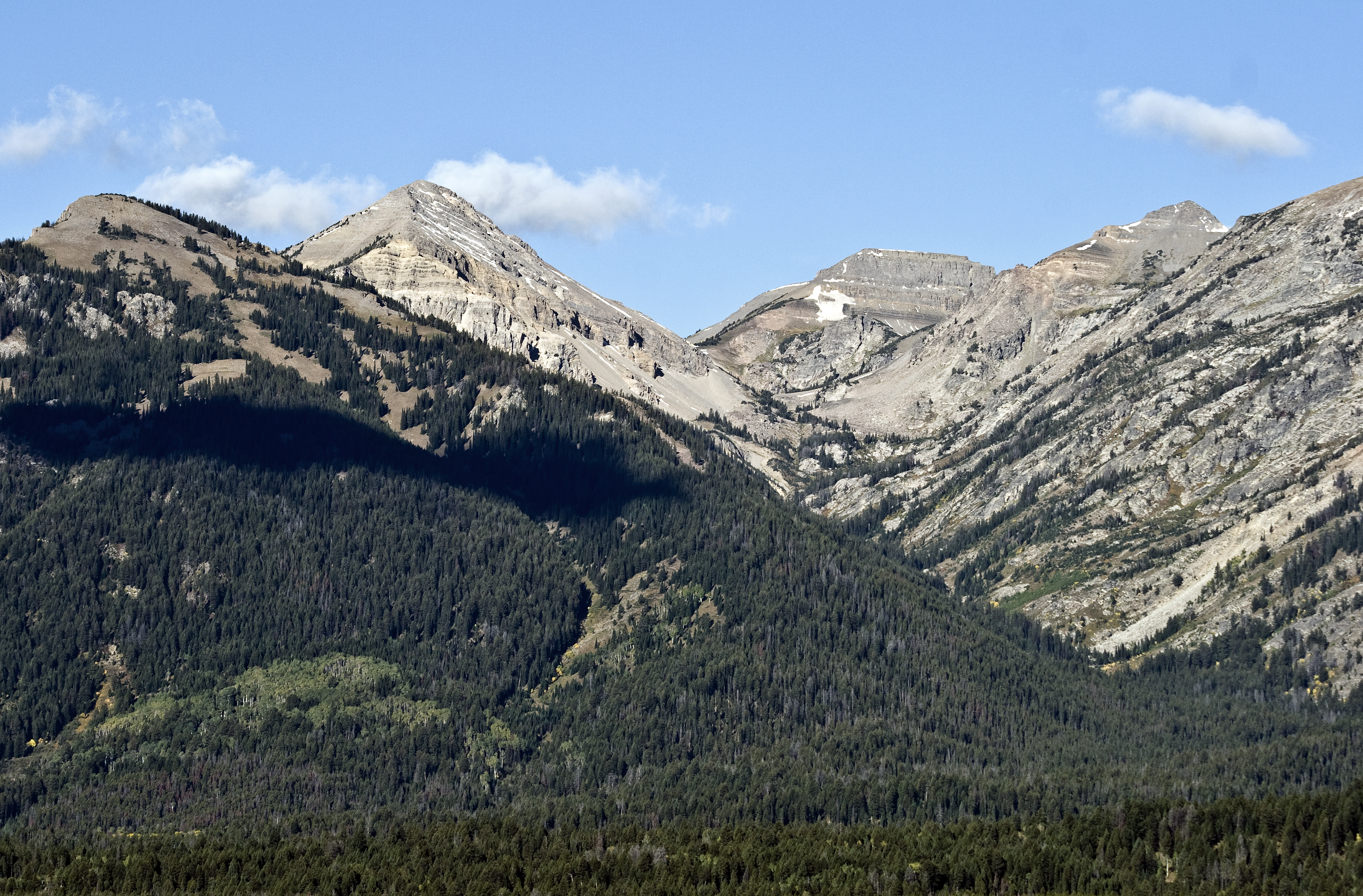
- Open Canyon and Mount Hunt at left

Geography
- Country: United States
- State: Wyoming
- County: Teton
- Coordinates: 43°37′42″N 110°48′18″W
- Interactive map of Open Canyon

Open Canyon is located in Grand Teton National Park, in the U. S. state of Wyoming. The canyon was formed by glaciers which retreated at the end of the Last Glacial Maximum approximately 15,000 years ago, leaving behind a U-shaped valley. Open Canyon is situated between Mount Hunt, Prospectors Mountain and Coyote Lake which are at the head of the canyon. The canyon is accessed by way of the Open Canyon Trail.

== See also ==
- Canyons of the Teton Range
- Geology of the Grand Teton area
