= List of mountain passes in Wyoming (K–Y) =

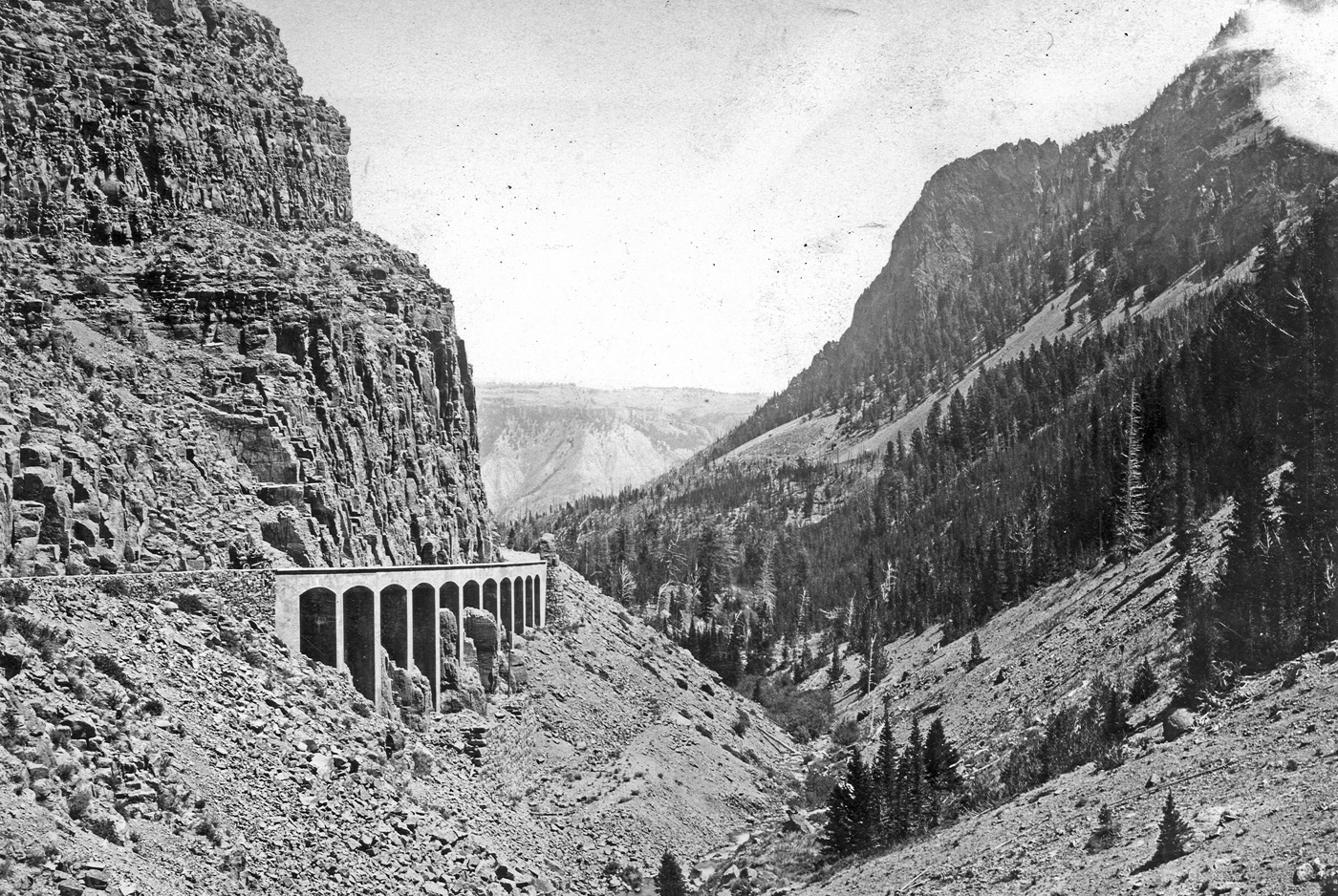
Kingman Pass, Park County, Wyoming 1921

There are at least 250 named mountain passes in Wyoming, a state in the mountain region of the Western United States. Wyoming is the 10th most extensive, but the least populous and the 2nd least densely populated of the 50 United States. The western two thirds of the state is covered mostly with the mountain ranges and rangelands in the foothills of the Eastern Rocky Mountains, while the eastern third of the state is high elevation prairie known as the High Plains.

- Kagevah Pass, Sublette County, Wyoming, 42°55′30″N 109°21′22″W, el. 11,283 feet (3,439 m)
- Kessler Gap, Goshen County, Wyoming, 41°41′48″N 104°20′36″W, el. 4,888 feet (1,490 m)
- Kingman Pass, Park County, Wyoming, 44°56′06″N 110°43′24″W, el. 7,119 feet (2,170 m)
- Knapsack Col, Sublette County, Wyoming, 43°09′16″N 109°39′42″W, el. 12,260 feet (3,740 m)
- Lankin Gap, Fremont County, Wyoming, 42°31′18″N 107°33′16″W, el. 6,424 feet (1,958 m)
- Latham Pass, Converse County, Wyoming, 42°29′52″N 105°39′28″W, el. 7,638 feet (2,328 m)
- Lester Pass, Sublette County, Wyoming, 43°03′11″N 109°37′50″W, el. 11,115 feet (3,388 m)
- Lovely Pass, Park County, Wyoming, 44°38′37″N 110°07′00″W, el. 8,766 feet (2,672 m)
- Lower Dugway, Carbon County, Wyoming, 41°52′53″N 107°03′31″W, el. 6,398 feet (1,950 m)
- Manuel Gap, Sweetwater County, Wyoming, 41°19′38″N 108°19′04″W, el. 7,123 feet (2,171 m)
- Marston Pass, Fremont County, Wyoming, 43°56′58″N 109°51′28″W, el. 10,289 feet (3,136 m)
- McCann Pass, Goshen County, Wyoming, 42°22′20″N 104°38′04″W, el. 5,079 feet (1,548 m)
- McCompsey Pass, Goshen County, Wyoming, 41°42′36″N 104°03′35″W, el. 4,875 feet (1,486 m)
- McDougal Pass, Lincoln County, Wyoming, 42°51′06″N 110°48′24″W, el. 9,183 feet (2,799 m)
- McGinnis Pass, Goshen County, Wyoming, 42°19′42″N 104°38′55″W, el. 4,829 feet (1,472 m)
- McRae Gap, Natrona County, Wyoming, 42°53′44″N 107°17′19″W, el. 6,106 feet (1,861 m)
- Mexican Pass, Hot Springs County, Wyoming, 43°29′17″N 108°26′36″W, el. 6,263 feet (1,909 m)
- Minnies Gap, Sweetwater County, Wyoming, 41°00′23″N 109°25′36″W, el. 6,342 feet (1,933 m)
- Mist Creek Pass, Park County, Wyoming, 44°36′05″N 110°09′44″W, el. 8,658 feet (2,639 m)
- Moose Basin Divide, Teton County, Wyoming, 43°57′23″N 110°50′35″W, el. 9,718 feet (2,962 m)
- Morton Pass, Albany County, Wyoming, 41°41′10″N 105°31′02″W, el. 7,175 feet (2,187 m)
- Mosquito Pass, Teton County, Wyoming, 43°28′36″N 111°01′56″W, el. 8,327 feet (2,538 m)
- Mount Hunt Divide, Teton County, Wyoming, 43°37′46″N 110°51′02″W, el. 9,698 feet (2,956 m)
- Mount Meek Pass, Teton County, Wyoming, 43°41′03″N 110°52′29″W, el. 9,718 feet (2,962 m)
- Mud Pass, Teton County, Wyoming, 43°25′26″N 110°59′37″W, el. 8,894 feet (2,711 m)
- Muddy Gap, Carbon County, Wyoming, 42°20′47″N 107°27′44″W, el. 6,296 feet (1,919 m)
- Mule Creek Pass, Albany County, Wyoming, 42°15′18″N 105°44′03″W, el. 7,621 feet (2,323 m)
- Munkres Pass, Johnson County, Wyoming, 44°08′45″N 107°03′10″W, el. 9,452 feet (2,881 m)
- No Mans Pass, Fremont County, Wyoming, 43°18′48″N 109°39′03″W, el. 12,162 feet (3,707 m)
- Nord Pass, Teton County, Wyoming, 43°56′28″N 110°51′56″W, el. 9,403 feet (2,866 m)
- Norris Pass, Teton County, Wyoming, 44°26′01″N 110°43′13″W, el. 8,241 feet (2,512 m)
- North Indian Creek Pass, Lincoln County, Wyoming, 43°18′50″N 110°58′05″W, el. 9,275 feet (2,827 m)
- Oberg Pass, Carbon County, Wyoming, 41°33′04″N 106°35′17″W, el. 8,199 feet (2,499 m)
- Packsaddle Pass, Teton County, Wyoming, 43°27′11″N 110°27′00″W, el. 10,118 feet (3,084 m)
- Paintbrush Divide, Teton County, Wyoming, 43°47′35″N 110°49′05″W, el. 10,720 feet (3,270 m)
- Petes Gap, Carbon County, Wyoming, 42°02′04″N 106°18′04″W, el. 6,795 feet (2,071 m)
- Phelps Pass, Teton County, Wyoming, 44°05′46″N 110°11′45″W, el. 8,937 feet (2,724 m)
- Phillips Pass, Teton County, Wyoming, 43°32′54″N 110°55′56″W, el. 8,930 feet (2,720 m)
- Photo Pass, Fremont County, Wyoming, 42°56′37″N 109°22′30″W, el. 11,411 feet (3,478 m)
- Pickle Pass, Lincoln County, Wyoming, 43°05′14″N 110°38′39″W, el. 8,845 feet (2,696 m)
- Pierpont Pass, Park County, Wyoming, 43°51′29″N 109°43′05″W, el. 10,321 feet (3,146 m)
- Piney Pass, Park County, Wyoming, 44°10′38″N 109°22′51″W, el. 10,256 feet (3,126 m)
- Porcupine Pass, Sublette County, Wyoming, 43°12′10″N 109°51′07″W, el. 10,702 feet (3,262 m)
- Powder River Pass, Johnson County, Wyoming, 44°08′59″N 107°04′46″W, el. 9,662 feet (2,945 m)
- Pritchard Pass, Teton County, Wyoming, 43°19′02″N 110°48′13″W, el. 6,542 feet (1,994 m)
- Quaking Asp Gap, Fremont County, Wyoming, 42°33′03″N 107°43′47″W, el. 6,424 feet (1,958 m)
- Quealy Gap, Carbon County, Wyoming, 41°45′13″N 106°30′40″W, el. 7,464 feet (2,275 m)
- Ram Pass, Sublette County, Wyoming, 43°17′10″N 109°46′28″W, el. 11,729 feet (3,575 m)
- Rampart Pass, Park County, Wyoming, 44°14′53″N 109°50′41″W, el. 10,751 feet (3,277 m)
- Rattlesnake Pass, Carbon County, Wyoming, 41°41′59″N 106°34′58″W, el. 7,513 feet (2,290 m)
- Red Pass, Lincoln County, Wyoming, 43°16′27″N 110°52′50″W, el. 8,707 feet (2,654 m)
- Redenbaugh Pass, Converse County, Wyoming, 42°30′59″N 105°39′24″W, el. 7,585 feet (2,312 m)
- Reed Pass, Albany County, Wyoming, 42°16′06″N 105°44′16″W, el. 7,851 feet (2,393 m)
- Republic Pass, Park County, Wyoming, 44°57′08″N 109°57′13″W, el. 9,993 feet (3,046 m)
- Richards Gap, Sweetwater County, Wyoming, 41°00′41″N 109°13′30″W, el. 6,342 feet (1,933 m)
- Riddle Cut, Carbon County, Wyoming, 42°06′58″N 107°07′55″W, el. 7,260 feet (2,210 m)
- Rock Chuck Pass, Sheridan County, Wyoming, 44°37′08″N 107°21′26″W, el. 9,839 feet (2,999 m)
- Rocky Gap, Lincoln County, Wyoming, 42°00′07″N 110°30′03″W, el. 7,641 feet (2,329 m)
- Rocky Gap, Carbon County, Wyoming, 42°23′16″N 106°46′00″W, el. 6,627 feet (2,020 m)
- Rocky Gap, Natrona County, Wyoming, 42°37′34″N 106°15′54″W, el. 7,214 feet (2,199 m)
- Rocky Pass, Platte County, Wyoming, 42°20′19″N 104°44′40″W, el. 4,797 feet (1,462 m)
- Salt River Pass, Lincoln County, Wyoming, 42°30′22″N 110°54′31″W, el. 7,625 feet (2,324 m)
- Sand Gap, Sweetwater County, Wyoming, 41°57′58″N 108°58′52″W, el. 7,890 feet (2,400 m)
- Scenic Pass, Fremont County, Wyoming, 43°17′17″N 109°30′46″W, el. 11,335 feet (3,455 m)
- Schofield Pass, Converse County, Wyoming, 42°41′30″N 105°31′15″W, el. 5,689 feet (1,734 m)
- Session Pass, Uinta County, Wyoming, 41°33′45″N 111°00′12″W, el. 6,798 feet (2,072 m)
- Seward Pass, Platte County, Wyoming, 42°18′41″N 104°37′56″W, el. 4,734 feet (1,443 m)
- Shannon Pass, Sublette County, Wyoming, 43°08′43″N 109°42′14″W, el. 11,161 feet (3,402 m)
- Sheep Pass, Lincoln County, Wyoming, 42°36′12″N 110°45′21″W, el. 10,026 feet (3,056 m)
- Sheridan Pass, Fremont County, Wyoming, 43°37′20″N 110°02′05″W, el. 9,229 feet (2,813 m)
- Shoshone Pass (Bilíaliche, "like a tepee door"), Park County, Wyoming, 43°48′45″N 109°48′48″W, el. 9,669 feet (2,947 m)
- Silver Gate, Park County, Wyoming, 44°56′37″N 110°43′02″W, el. 7,060 feet (2,150 m)
- Simpson Gap, Carbon County, Wyoming, 41°50′11″N 106°27′21″W, el. 7,123 feet (2,171 m)
- Sioux Pass, Fremont County, Wyoming, 42°33′31″N 108°53′32″W, el. 9,751 feet (2,972 m)
- Sioux Pass, Natrona County, Wyoming, 43°27′17″N 107°27′32″W, el. 7,146 feet (2,178 m)
- Sixmile Gap, Carbon County, Wyoming, 41°02′38″N 106°23′38″W, el. 7,608 feet (2,319 m)
- Smoky Gap, Natrona County, Wyoming, 43°22′33″N 106°24′33″W, el. 5,344 feet (1,629 m)
- Snow Pass, Park County, Wyoming, 44°57′33″N 110°44′11″W, el. 7,467 feet (2,276 m)
- Snowshoe Pass, Park County, Wyoming, 44°56′27″N 110°54′04″W, el. 9,606 feet (2,928 m)
- Snowshoe Pass, Big Horn County, Wyoming, 44°31′46″N 107°30′37″W, el. 8,651 feet (2,637 m)
- Snowy Range Pass, Albany County, Wyoming, 41°20′39″N 106°18′07″W, el. 10,876 feet (3,315 m)
- South Pass, Fremont County, Wyoming, 42°22′12″N 108°54′48″W, el. 7,559 feet (2,304 m)
- Spring Gap, Uinta County, Wyoming, 41°20′05″N 110°40′19″W, el. 6,998 feet (2,133 m)
- Stone Pillar Pass, Sublette County, Wyoming, 43°10′22″N 109°41′47″W, el. 12,277 feet (3,742 m)
- Summit of the Original South Pass, Fremont County, Wyoming, 42°20′37″N 108°53′11″W, el. 7,408 feet (2,258 m)
- Sunrise Pass, Albany County, Wyoming, 41°03′57″N 105°58′35″W, el. 8,176 feet (2,492 m)
- Sweetwater Gap, Fremont County, Wyoming, 42°39′28″N 109°03′26″W, el. 10,348 feet (3,154 m)
- Sylvan Pass, Park County, Wyoming, 44°27′56″N 110°07′49″W, el. 8,524 feet (2,598 m)
- Telephone Pass, Lincoln County, Wyoming, 43°01′06″N 110°42′21″W, el. 7,972 feet (2,430 m)
- Tepee Pass, Fremont County, Wyoming, 42°54′27″N 109°15′08″W, el. 11,083 feet (3,378 m)
- Teton Pass, Teton County, Wyoming, 43°29′51″N 110°57′19″W, el. 8,435 feet (2,571 m)
- Texas Pass, Sublette County, Wyoming, 42°47′28″N 109°13′03″W, el. 11,434 feet (3,485 m)
- The Cut, Park County, Wyoming, 44°56′00″N 110°28′43″W, el. 7,552 feet (2,302 m)
- The Gap, Natrona County, Wyoming, 43°21′09″N 106°44′08″W, el. 5,522 feet (1,683 m)
- The Gap, Campbell County, Wyoming, 44°11′40″N 105°26′18″W, el. 4,751 feet (1,448 m)
- The Narrows, Lincoln County, Wyoming, 42°07′54″N 110°58′14″W, el. 6,148 feet (1,874 m)
- The Narrows, Sweetwater County, Wyoming, 41°08′35″N 109°16′10″W, el. 8,051 feet (2,454 m)
- The Narrows, Sublette County, Wyoming, 43°01′52″N 110°06′17″W, el. 7,510 feet (2,290 m)
- The Narrows, Park County, Wyoming, 44°54′01″N 110°23′26″W, el. 6,171 feet (1,881 m)
- The Narrows, Lincoln County, Wyoming, 42°50′54″N 110°59′08″W, el. 6,069 feet (1,850 m)
- The Rim, Sublette County, Wyoming, 43°07′58″N 110°12′01″W, el. 7,926 feet (2,416 m)
- The Slip, Johnson County, Wyoming, 43°51′36″N 106°57′25″W, el. 7,963 feet (2,427 m)
- Thompson Pass, Sublette County, Wyoming, 42°28′51″N 110°35′06″W, el. 8,756 feet (2,669 m)
- Threlkeld Pass, Sublette County, Wyoming, 43°05′39″N 109°43′30″W, el. 10,863 feet (3,311 m)
- Titsworth Gap, Sweetwater County, Wyoming, 41°12′00″N 109°03′01″W, el. 7,126 feet (2,172 m)
- Togwotee Pass, Teton County, Wyoming, 43°45′00″N 110°04′48″W, el. 9,655 feet (2,943 m)
- Toll Gap, Johnson County, Wyoming, 43°42′59″N 106°54′48″W, el. 5,837 feet (1,779 m)
- Two Ocean Pass, Teton County, Wyoming, 44°02′28″N 110°10′03″W, el. 8,130 feet (2,480 m)
- U T Pass, Natrona County, Wyoming, 42°45′12″N 107°15′00″W, el. 7,588 feet (2,313 m)
- Union Pass, Fremont County, Wyoming, 43°28′53″N 109°52′36″W, el. 9,212 feet (2,808 m)
- Virden Pass, Converse County, Wyoming, 42°33′47″N 105°40′07″W, el. 7,064 feet (2,153 m)
- Vista Pass, Sublette County, Wyoming, 43°09′54″N 109°43′57″W, el. 10,144 feet (3,092 m)
- Wagner Pass, Lincoln County, Wyoming, 42°31′26″N 110°42′50″W, el. 9,042 feet (2,756 m)
- Washakie Pass, Sublette County, Wyoming, 42°49′12″N 109°15′40″W, el. 11,611 feet (3,539 m)
- Weiser Pass, Fremont County, Wyoming, 42°39′14″N 108°30′37″W, el. 6,388 feet (1,947 m)
- West Fork Pass, Converse County, Wyoming, 42°27′43″N 105°36′00″W, el. 7,159 feet (2,182 m)
- West Pass, Sheridan County, Wyoming, 44°53′55″N 107°34′34″W, el. 7,342 feet (2,238 m)
- Whiskey Gap, Wyoming, Carbon County, Wyoming, 42°19′50″N 107°24′52″W, el. 6,539 feet (1,993 m)
- White Pass, Fremont County, Wyoming, 43°38′04″N 109°44′52″W, el. 8,097 feet (2,468 m)
- White Saddle, Lincoln County, Wyoming, 42°23′55″N 110°42′35″W, el. 8,724 feet (2,659 m)
- Wilson Gap, Carbon County, Wyoming, 41°46′13″N 106°33′45″W, el. 7,047 feet (2,148 m)
- Windy Gap, Lincoln County, Wyoming, 41°59′01″N 110°31′03″W, el. 7,539 feet (2,298 m)
- Windy Gap, Fremont County, Wyoming, 43°39′12″N 109°31′34″W, el. 7,749 feet (2,362 m)
- Windy Gap, Fremont County, Wyoming, 43°01′24″N 109°22′32″W, el. 11,627 feet (3,544 m)
- Wolf Gap, Natrona County, Wyoming, 42°35′59″N 107°21′41″W, el. 6,827 feet (2,081 m)
- Woodchuck Pass, Sheridan County, Wyoming, 44°36′13″N 107°25′18″W, el. 9,636 feet (2,937 m)
- Woodruff Lower Narrows, Uinta County, Wyoming, 41°31′31″N 111°00′41″W, el. 6,375 feet (1,943 m)
- Woodruff Upper Narrows, Uinta County, Wyoming, 41°30′30″N 111°00′28″W, el. 6,401 feet (1,951 m)
- Wright Divide, Lincoln County, Wyoming, 42°00′28″N 110°31′19″W, el. 7,566 feet (2,306 m)
- Youngs Pass, Carbon County, Wyoming, 42°16′26″N 107°17′37″W, el. 8,747 feet (2,666 m)

== See also ==
- List of mountain passes in Wyoming (A–J)
