= Dudley Lake =

Dudley Lake may refer to:

- Dudley Lake (Rice County, Minnesota)
- Dudley Lake (Teton County, Wyoming)
