= Windy Gap =

Windy Gap may refer to:

- Windy Gap (Antarctica), a pass on the Louis Philippe Plateau
- Windy Gap (Wyoming), a mountain pass in Wyoming
- Windy Gap (Fremont County, Wyoming), a mountain pass in Wyoming
- Windy Gap (Lincoln County, Wyoming), a mountain pass in Wyoming
- Windy Gap, a pass on D'Aguilar Peninsula, Hong Kong Island, Hong Kong
- Windy Gap Trail (Angeles National Forest), in the Angeles National Forest, California
- "Windy Gap" (poem), a 1951 poem by Australian poet David Campbell

== See also ==
- Windy Gap Reservoir, Granby, Colorado
- Windy Pass (disambiguation)
- Windy Saddle (disambiguation)
