= Welcome Nunatak =

Welcome Nunatak (79°6′S 85°54′W) is a relatively small but truly distinctive cone-shaped nunatak standing in near isolation to the north of Reuther Nunataks in the Founders Peaks, Heritage Range. Named by the University of Minnesota Geological Party, 1963–64. For the members of the party using motor toboggans, the nunatak was a welcome sight as it meant they were almost to base camp, located at Camp Hills.
