= Moran Canyon =

Moran Canyon may refer to:

- Moran Canyon (British Columbia), a major canyon and proposed damsite on the Fraser River, British Columbia, located at Moran, British Columbia.
- Moran Canyon (Wyoming), a canyon in Grand Teton National Park, Wyoming, United States
