= Traverse Peak =

Mountain in the state of Wyoming

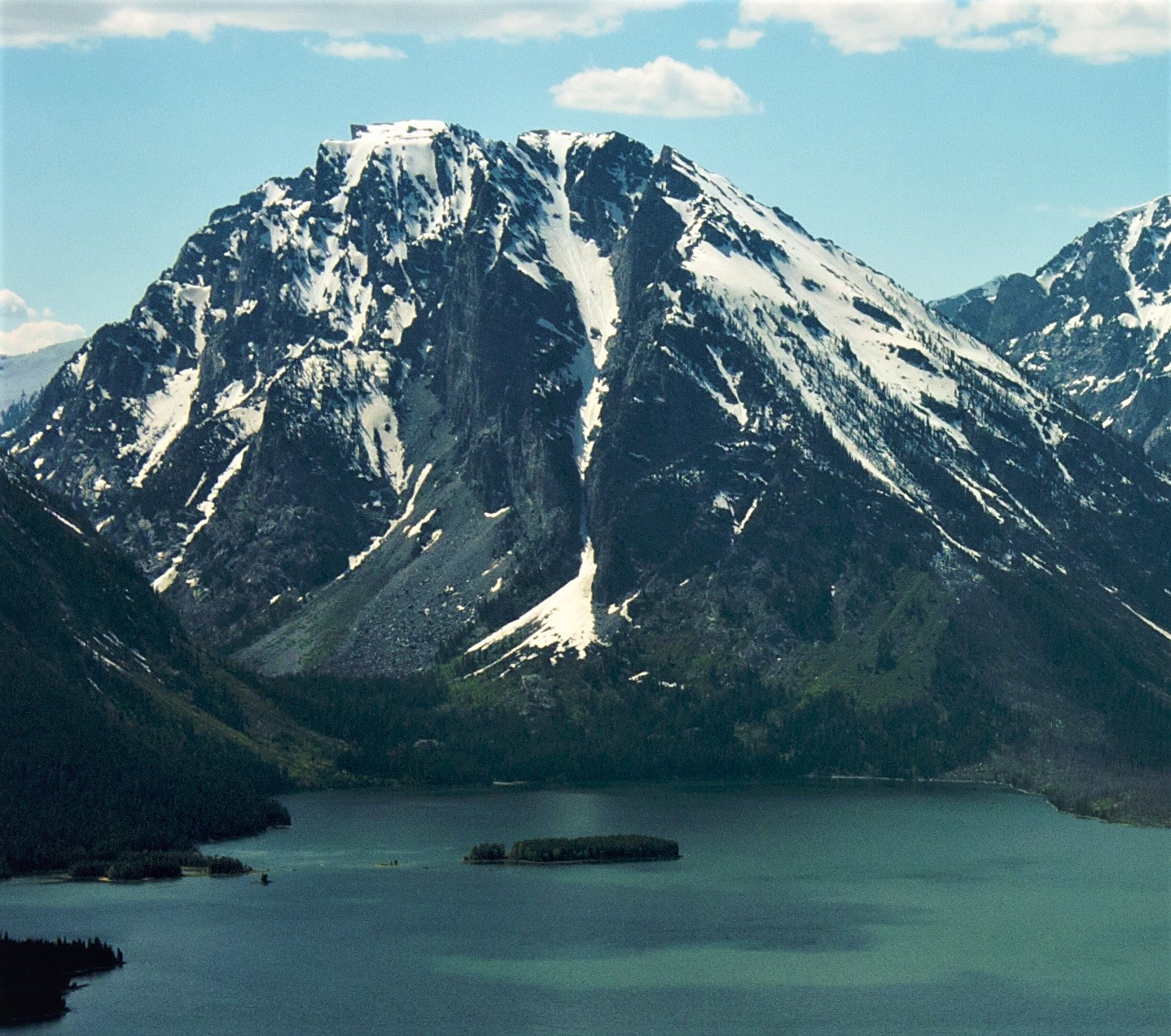
- Traverse Peak behind left of centered Bivouac Peak

Highest point
- Elevation: 11,056 ft (3,370 m)
- Prominence: 1,291 ft (393 m)
- Coordinates: 43°52′05″N 110°47′41″W

Geography
- Location within Wyoming Location within the United States
- Location: Grand Teton National Park, Teton County, Wyoming, U.S.
- Parent range: Teton Range
- Topo map: USGS Mount Moran

Traverse Peak (11,056 feet (3,370 m)) is in the northern Teton Range, Grand Teton National Park, Wyoming. The mountain rises abruptly above Moran Canyon to the south and the south fork of Snowshoe Canyon to the north. From Moran Bay on Jackson Lake, the south slopes of the mountain can be seen behind Bivouac Peak rising above Moran Canyon.

In 1934 Irene Ayres and her brother made the first recorded ascent of the peak. They chose the name.
