= Coyote Lake (Teton County, Wyoming) =

Lake in the American state of Wyoming

- Location within Wyoming Location within the United States
- Location: Grand Teton National Park, Teton County, Wyoming, US
- Coordinates: 43°38′22″N 110°52′14″W
- Lake type: Glacial Lake
- Basin countries: United States
- Max. length: 200 yd (180 m)
- Max. width: 150 yd (140 m)
- Surface elevation: 10,201 ft (3,109 m)

Coyote Lake is located in Grand Teton National Park, in the U. S. state of Wyoming. Situated .70 miles (1.13 km) north-northwest of Mount Hunt.

== Description ==
Coyote Lake lies in a cirque nearly surrounded by several unnamed peaks each nearly 11,000 feet (3,400 m) above sea level. Coyote Lake sits in a cirque at the head of Open Canyon and can be reached from the Open Canyon Trail but requires off trail navigation to access. The lake is located at the head of the south fork on the Open Canyon trail.

In 1927 The Pinehole Roundup printed an article titled, "Two Weeks in the Rockies With a Forest Ranger by C.H. McDonald. In the article Coyote Lake was described as "Mud Lake". The writer detailed a story about their horse becoming stuck in the lake mud and struggling to free itself.
