= Windy Peak =

Windy Peak is the name of several mountain summits:

- Windy Peak (Antarctica)
- Windy Peak (Alberta), in Alberta, Canada
- Windy Peak (Kenosha Mountains), in Colorado, United States
- Windy Peak (Washington), in United States
