= Matney Peak =

Mountain in Ellsworth Land, Antarctica

Matney Peak (79°10′S 86°14′W) is a mostly ice-free peak, 1,810 metres (5,940 ft) high, near the middle of the line of peaks on the east side of Webster Glacier in the Heritage Range of the Ellsworth Mountains, Antarctica. It was mapped by the United States Geological Survey from surveys and U.S. Navy air photos, 1961–1966, and was named by the Advisory Committee on Antarctic Names for Chief Aviation Boatswain's Mate William R. Matney of the U.S. Navy who contributed significantly to improving fuel operations in Antarctica and, for a portion of Operation Deep Freeze 1966, acted as fuels officer.

== See also ==
- Mountains in Antarctica
