= Windy Saddle =

Windy Saddle may refer to:

- Windy Saddle Park, Jefferson County, Colorado; see Mount Zion (Colorado)
- A feature in the Hells Canyon National Recreation Area, Idaho County, Idaho

== See also ==
- Windy Gap (disambiguation)
- Windy Pass (disambiguation)
