= Snowshoe Canyon =

Canyon in the state of Wyoming

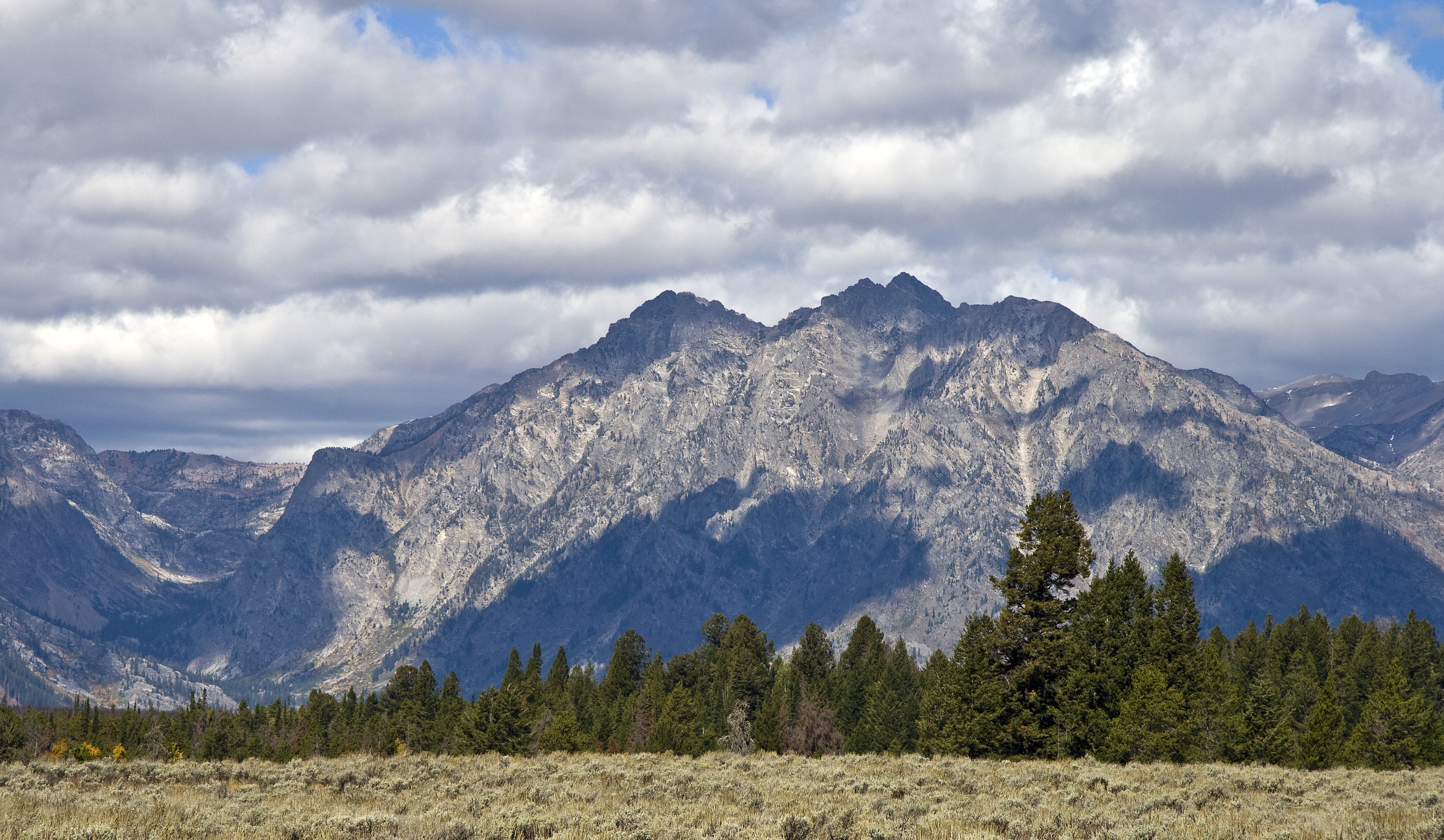
- Snowshoe Canyon at left below Eagles Rest Peak at center

Geography
- Country: United States
- State: Wyoming
- County: Teton
- Coordinates: 43°52′15″N 110°44′14″W
- Lake: Jackson Lake
- Interactive map of Snowshoe Canyon

Snowshoe Canyon is located in Grand Teton National Park, in the U. S. state of Wyoming. The canyon was formed by glaciers which retreated at the end of the Last Glacial Maximum approximately 15,000 years ago, leaving behind a U-shaped valley. Snowshoe Canyon splits into an upper and lower canyon. The source of the upper canyon is near Talus Lake (9,670 feet (2,950 m)) while the south canyon is situated between Rolling Thunder Mountain to the north and Raynolds, Traverse and Bivouac Peaks to the south (9,600 feet (2,900 m)). Near the fork of north and south Snowshoe Canyon lies Dudley Lake. The canyon terminus is at Moran Bay on the southwest side of Jackson Lake, below Eagles Rest Peak.

== See also ==
- Canyons of the Teton Range
- Geology of the Grand Teton area
