= Valhalla Canyon =

Canyon in the state of Wyoming

Geography
- Country: United States
- State: Wyoming
- County: Teton
- Coordinates: 43°45′51″N 110°48′09″W
- Interactive map of Valhalla Canyon

Valhalla Canyon is located in Grand Teton National Park, in the U. S. state of Wyoming. The canyon was formed by glaciers which retreated at the end of the Last Glacial Maximum approximately 15,000 years ago, leaving behind a U-shaped valley. Valhalla Canyon extends from the northwest flanks of Grand Teton and Mount Owen and ends in Cascade Canyon.

== See also ==
- Canyons of the Teton Range
- Geology of the Grand Teton area
