= Owl Peak =

Mountain in the state of Wyoming

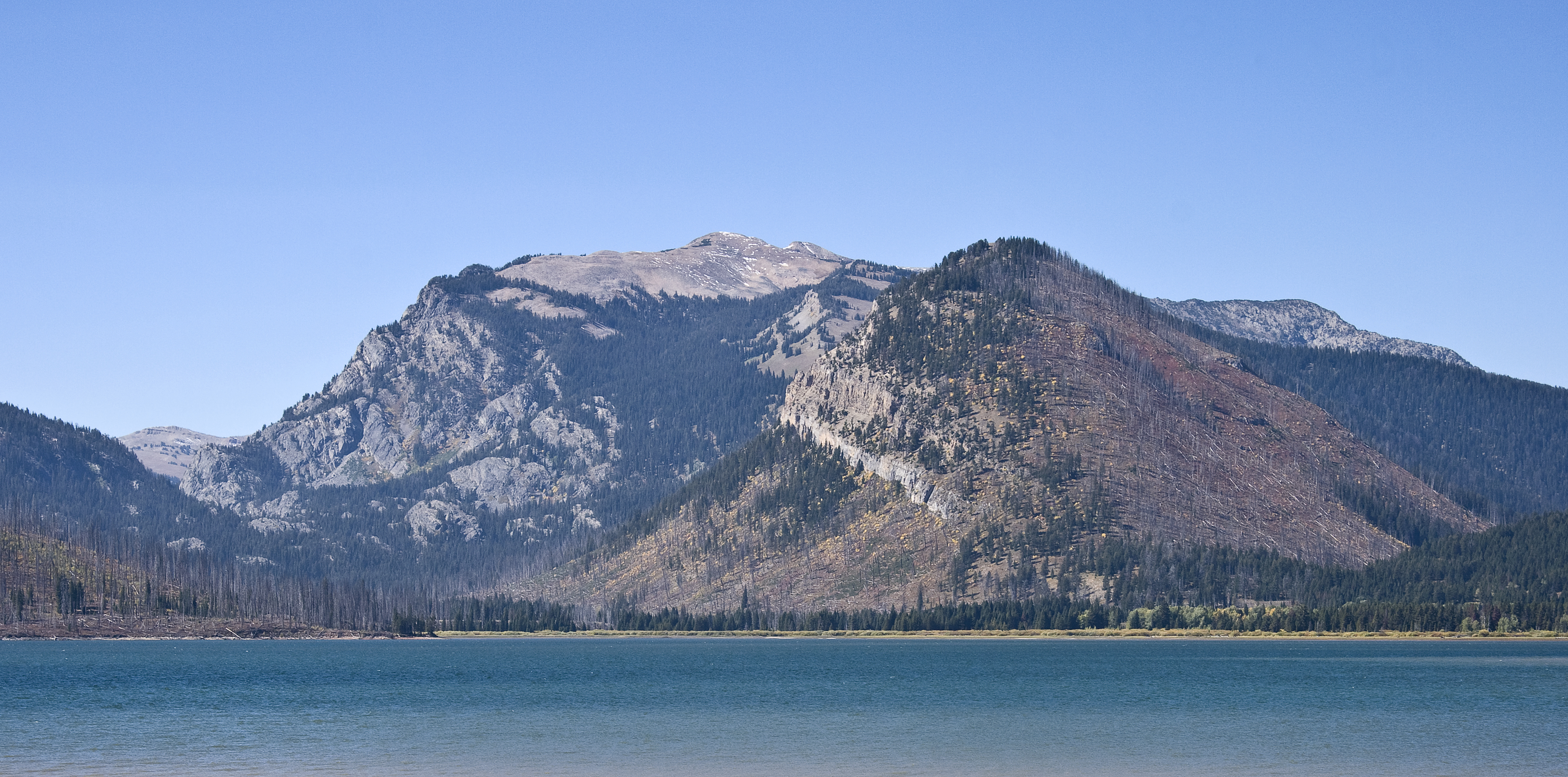
- Owl Peak center with Webb Canyon at left

Highest point
- Elevation: 10,617 ft (3,236 m)
- Prominence: 692 ft (211 m)
- Coordinates: 43°58′40″N 110°47′41″W

Geography
- Location within Wyoming Location within the United States
- Location: Grand Teton National Park, Teton County, Wyoming, U.S.
- Parent range: Teton Range
- Topo map: USGS Ranger Peak

Owl Peak (10,617 feet (3,236 m)) is in the northern Teton Range, Grand Teton National Park, Wyoming and is just east of Elk Mountain. The peak is located west of and across Jackson Lake from Lizard Creek Campground. Access to the peak is easiest by boat to the Berry Creek Trailhead at Wilcox Point then heading west at the Owl Creek Trail. After a 2 miles (3.2 km) hike along Berry Creek and Owl Creek trails, off trail access to the summit can be achieved after a steep ascent of an additional 2 miles (3.2 km). North of the mountain, the Tetons blend into the Yellowstone Plateau while to the south lies Webb Canyon.
