= Pardue Peak =

Mountain in Ellsworth Land, Antarctica

Pardue Peak (79°6′S 86°30′W) is the northernmost peak, 1,840 m, on Smith Ridge in the Founders Peaks, Heritage Range. It was mapped by the United States Geological Survey (USGS) from surveys and U.S. Navy air photos from 1961 to 1966. It was named by the Advisory Committee on Antarctic Names (US-ACAN) for Lieutenant A. Michael Pardue, (MC) U.S. Navy, who was a Flight Surgeon with Squadron VX-6 in Antarctica in 1960–61.

== See also ==
- Mountains in Antarctica
