= Colter Canyon =

Canyon in Grand Teton National Park in the U.S.

- Location within Wyoming

Geography
- Country: United States
- State: Wyoming
- County: Teton
- Coordinates: 43.9447°N 110.702°W
- Lake: Jackson Lake
- Interactive map of Colter Canyon

Colter Canyon is located in Grand Teton National Park, in the U.S. state of Wyoming. The canyon was formed by glaciers which retreated at the end of the Last Glacial Maximum approximately 15,000 years ago, leaving behind a U-shaped valley. Colter Canyon is north of Ranger Peak and the entrance to the canyon is along the northwestern shore of Jackson Lake.

== See also ==
- Canyons of the Teton Range
- Geology of the Grand Teton area
