= Webster Glacier =

Glacier in Antarctica

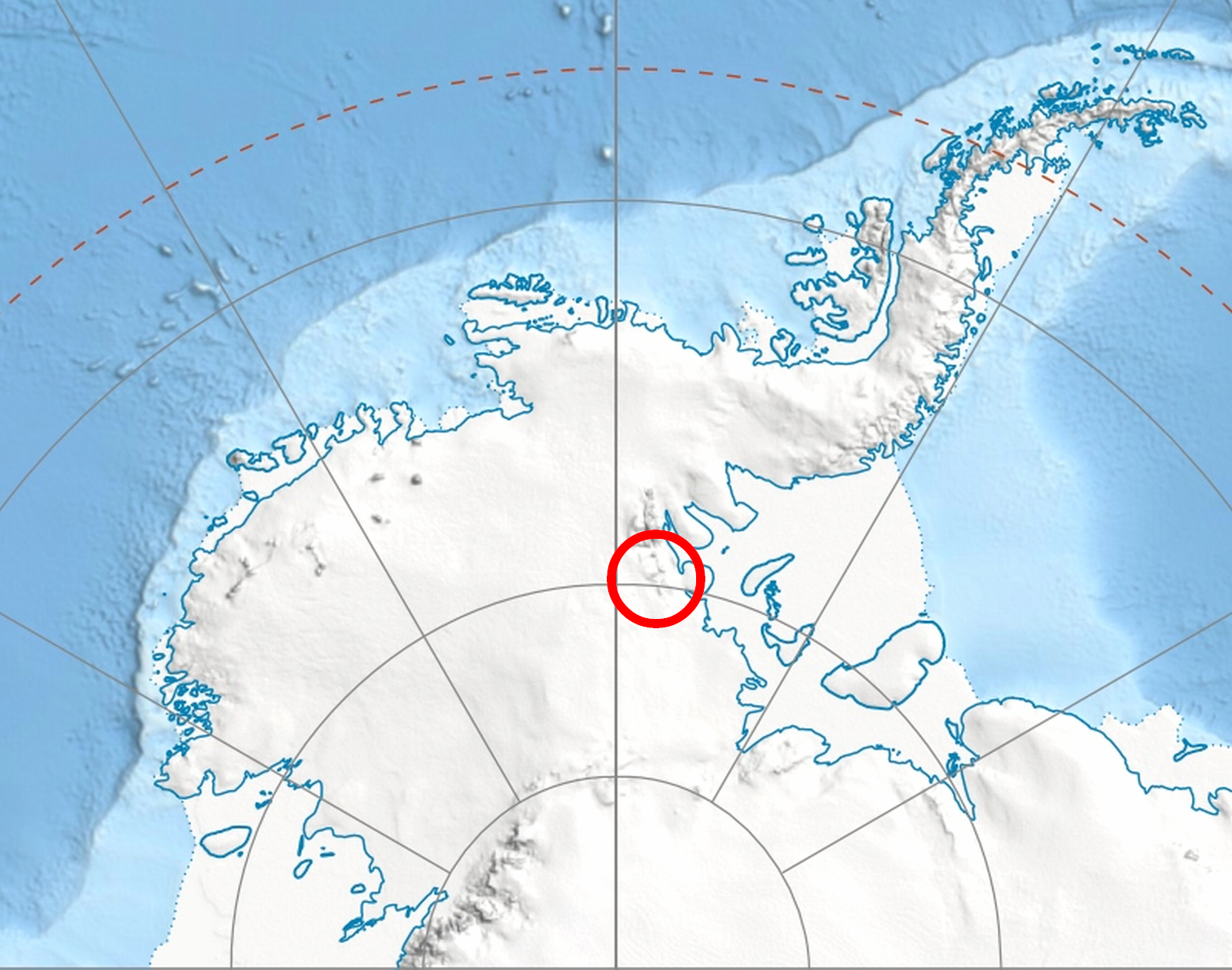
- Location of Heritage Range in Western Antarctica

- Location within Antarctica
- Location: Heritage Range, Ellsworth Land
- Coordinates: 79°6′00″S 86°11′00″W
- Thickness: unknown
- Status: unknown

Webster Glacier (79°6′S 86°11′W) is a glacier in the Founders Peaks of the Heritage Range, flowing generally north between Frazier Ridge and Pipe Peak to enter Minnesota Glacier. Mapped by United States Geological Survey (USGS) from surveys and U.S. Navy air photos, 1961–66. Named by Advisory Committee on Antarctic Names (US-ACAN) for Charles W. Webster, United States Antarctic Research Program (USARP) meteorologist and member of the winter party at Wilkes Station in 1963.

== See also ==
- List of glaciers in the Antarctic
- Glaciology
