= Pipe Peak =

Mountain in Antarctica

Pipe Peak (79°9′S 86°15′W) is a sharp peak on a ridge, 1,720 m, rising 1.5 nautical miles (2.8 km) north of Matney Peak in the Founders Peaks, Heritage Range. It was named so by members of the University of Minnesota Geological Party of 1963–64 because a pipe was left here after a visit to the area.

== See also ==
- Mountains in Antarctica
