= Windy Peak (Antarctica) =

Mountain in Antarctica

Windy Peak (79°13′S 86°4′W) is a prominent peak, 1,910 m, located four kilometres (two nautical miles) southwest of the south end of Reuther Nunataks in the Founders Peaks, Heritage Range. It was so named by the University of Minnesota Geological Party of 1963–1964 because high-velocity winds were present here whenever the peak was visited.
