= Raynolds Peak =

Mountain in the state of Wyoming

- Location within Wyoming Location within the United States

Highest point
- Elevation: 10,915 ft (3,327 m)
- Prominence: 750 ft (230 m)
- Coordinates: 43°52′15″N 110°49′32″W

Geography
- Location: Grand Teton National Park, Teton County, Wyoming, U.S.
- Parent range: Teton Range
- Topo map: USGS Mount Moran

Raynolds Peak (10,915 feet (3,327 m)) is in the northern Teton Range, Grand Teton National Park, Wyoming. The mountain rises to the north of Moran Canyon and has numerous deep cirques on its north face above Snowshoe Canyon. There are no maintained trails in the region and the summit is 5 miles (8 km) west of Moran Bay on Jackson Lake. The peak is named after William F. Raynolds who was in charge of the 1859-1860 Raynolds Expedition to the region.
