= Muir Peak =

Mountain in Ellsworth Land, Antarctica

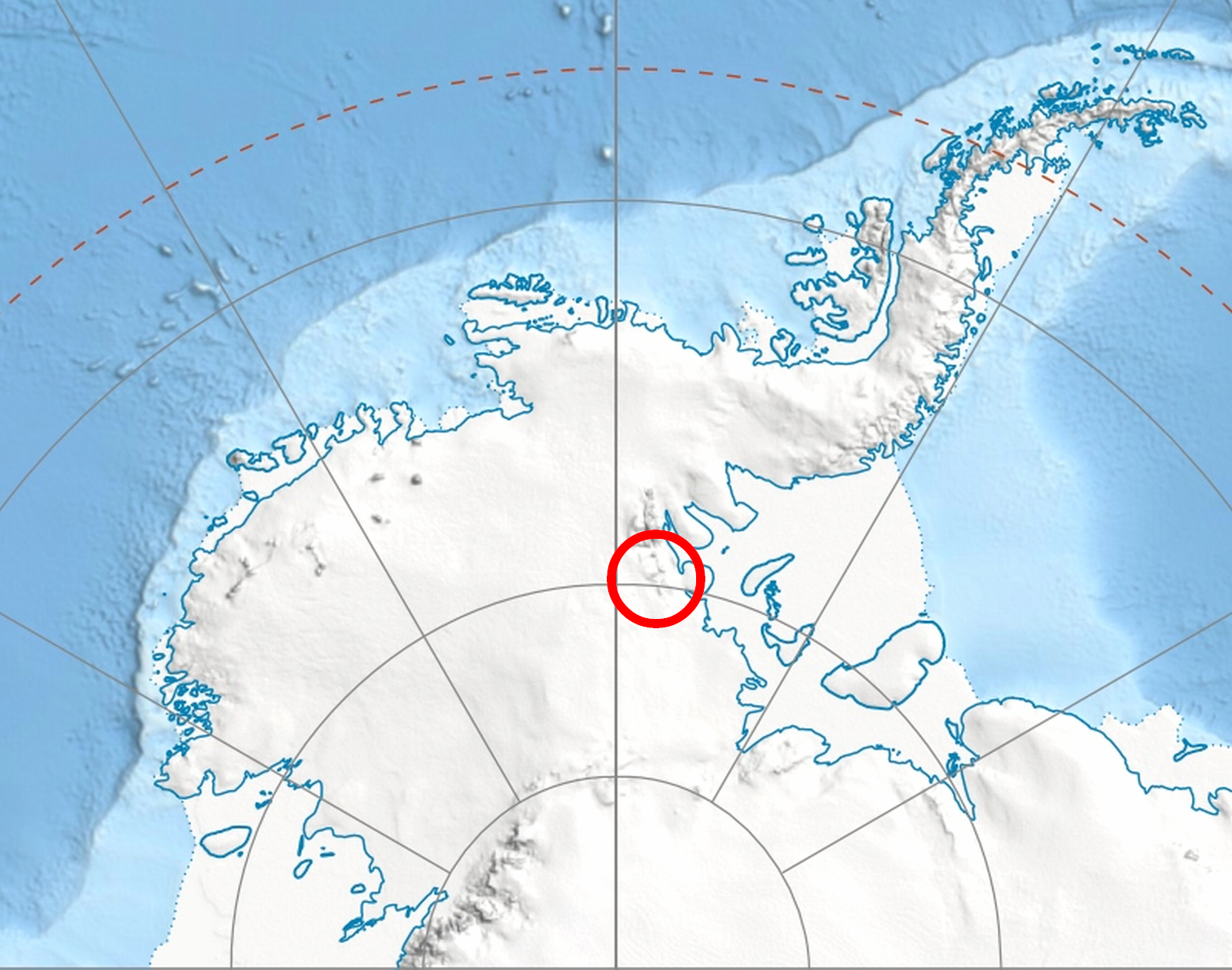
Location of Heritage Range in Western Antarctica.

Muir Peak (79°9′S 86°25′W) is a conspicuous rock peak near the middle of Frazier Ridge in the Founders Peaks, Heritage Range. It was mapped by the United States Geological Survey (USGS) from surveys and U.S. Navy air photos from 1961 to 1966. It was named by the Advisory Committee on Antarctic Names (US-ACAN) for Hugh M. Muir, a United States Antarctic Research Program (USARP) auroral scientist and member of the winter party at the Plateau Station in 1966.

== See also ==
- Mountains in Antarctica
