= Dudley Lake (Teton County, Wyoming) =

Lake in the American state of Wyoming

- Location within Wyoming Location within the United States
- Location: Grand Teton National Park, Teton County, Wyoming, US
- Coordinates: 43°52′48″N 110°46′54″W
- Lake type: Glacial lake
- Primary outflows: Moran Creek
- Basin countries: United States
- Surface elevation: 8,243 ft (2,512 m)
- Islands: 1

Dudley Lake is located in Grand Teton National Park, in the US state of Wyoming.

== Description ==
Dudley Lake is .80 miles (1.29 km) north of Bivouac Peak and near the north and south forks of Snowshoe Canyon. Dudley Lake was originally named Hanging Lake, and was renamed in honor of Dudley Hayden, an early park ranger. Access to the lake involves bushwhacking up into Snowshoe Canyon and is apparently easier if one passes the main stream draining from the lake and instead ascends from Moran Creek from the northwest.

== History ==
The lake was discovered in 1932 by park ranger Dudley Hayden. Following his death in 1969, the Jackson Hole Historical Society passed a resolution to rename Hanging Lake to Dudley Lake in his honor. Support for the name change came from then Governor Stan Hathaway, US Senators Gale McGee and Clifford Hansen, and US Congressman John S. Wold. The lake was officially renamed Dudley Lake by the Department of the Interior in 1970. (Note: Renamed in decision list 7004 by the US Board of Geographic Names)
