= Elk Mountain (Teton County, Wyoming) =

Mountain in Teton County, Wyoming, United States

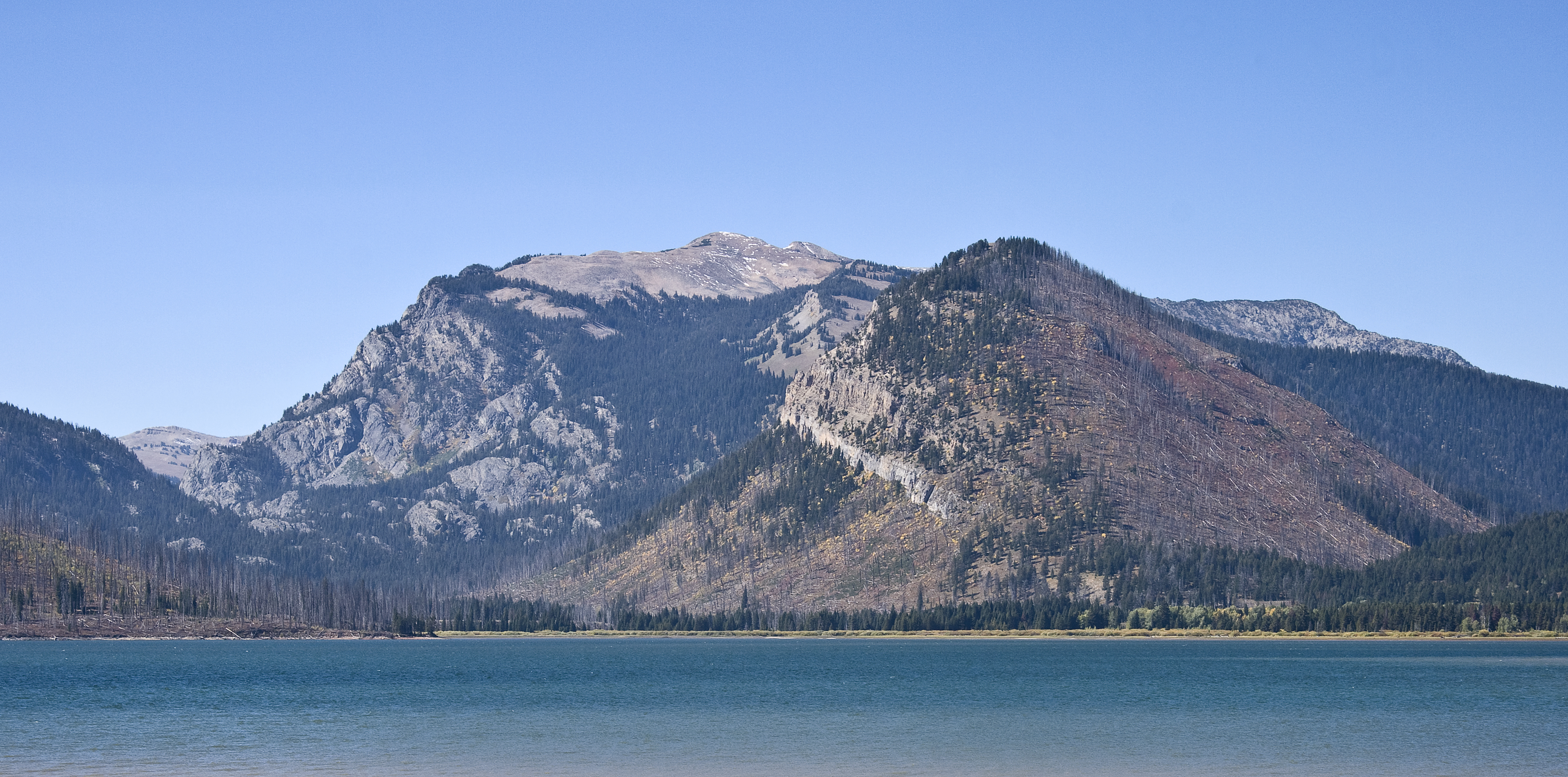
- Elk Mountain at far right background with Owl Peak at center, September 2010

Highest point
- Elevation: 10,720–10,800 ft (3,270–3,290 m)
- Prominence: 1,040 ft (320 m)
- Coordinates: 43°58′38″N 110°48′08″W

Geography
- Location within Wyoming Location within the United States
- Location: Grand Teton National Park, Teton County, Wyoming, U.S.
- Parent range: Teton Range
- Topo map: USGS Ranger Peak

Climbing
- Easiest route: Scramble

Elk Mountain is a 10,720-and-10,800-foot (3,270 and 3,290 m) mountain in the northern Teton Range, within the Grand Teton National Park, in Teton County, Wyoming, United States.

== Description ==
The peak is part of a ridge immediately west of Owl Peak. Elk Mountain is the northernmost peak in the Teton Range over 10,000 feet (3,000 m) in elevation. North of Elk Mountain, the Tetons blend into the Yellowstone Plateau.

== See also ==
- List of mountain peaks of Wyoming
