= Windy Peak (Kenosha Mountains) =

Mountain in the state of Colorado

- Location within Colorado

Highest point
- Elevation: 11,970 ft (3,648 m)
- Prominence: 1,510 ft (460 m)
- Isolation: 5.39 mi (8.67 km)
- Coordinates: 39°18′09″N 105°26′24″W

Geography
- Location: Park County, Colorado, U.S.
- Parent range: Front Range, Kenosha Mountains
- Topo map(s): USGS 7.5' topographic map Windy Peak, Colorado

Windy Peak, elevation 11,970 ft (3,648 m), is a summit in the Kenosha Mountains of central Colorado. The peak is south of Bailey in the Lost Creek Wilderness. It is also home to Outdoor Lab for Jefferson County.

== Historical names ==
- Storm Mountain
- Stormy Peak
- Windy Peak – 1994

== See also ==
- List of Colorado mountain ranges
- List of Colorado mountain summits
  - List of Colorado fourteeners
  - List of Colorado 4000 meter prominent summits
  - List of the most prominent summits of Colorado
- List of Colorado county high points
