= Rolling Thunder Mountain =

Mountain in Wyoming, United States

- Location within Wyoming Location within the United States

Highest point
- Elevation: 10,913 ft (3,326 m)
- Prominence: 668 ft (204 m)
- Coordinates: 43°53′26″N 110°48′38″W

Geography
- Location: Grand Teton National Park, Teton County, Wyoming, U.S.
- Parent range: Teton Range
- Topo map: USGS Ranger Peak

Rolling Thunder Mountain (10,913 feet (3,326 m)) is in the northern Teton Range, Grand Teton National Park, Wyoming. The peak is located northwest of Moran Bay on Jackson Lake and access to the peak involves navigating through several miles of backcountry areas of Snowshoe Canyon where there are no maintained trails.
