= Granite Canyon =

Canyon in the state of Wyoming

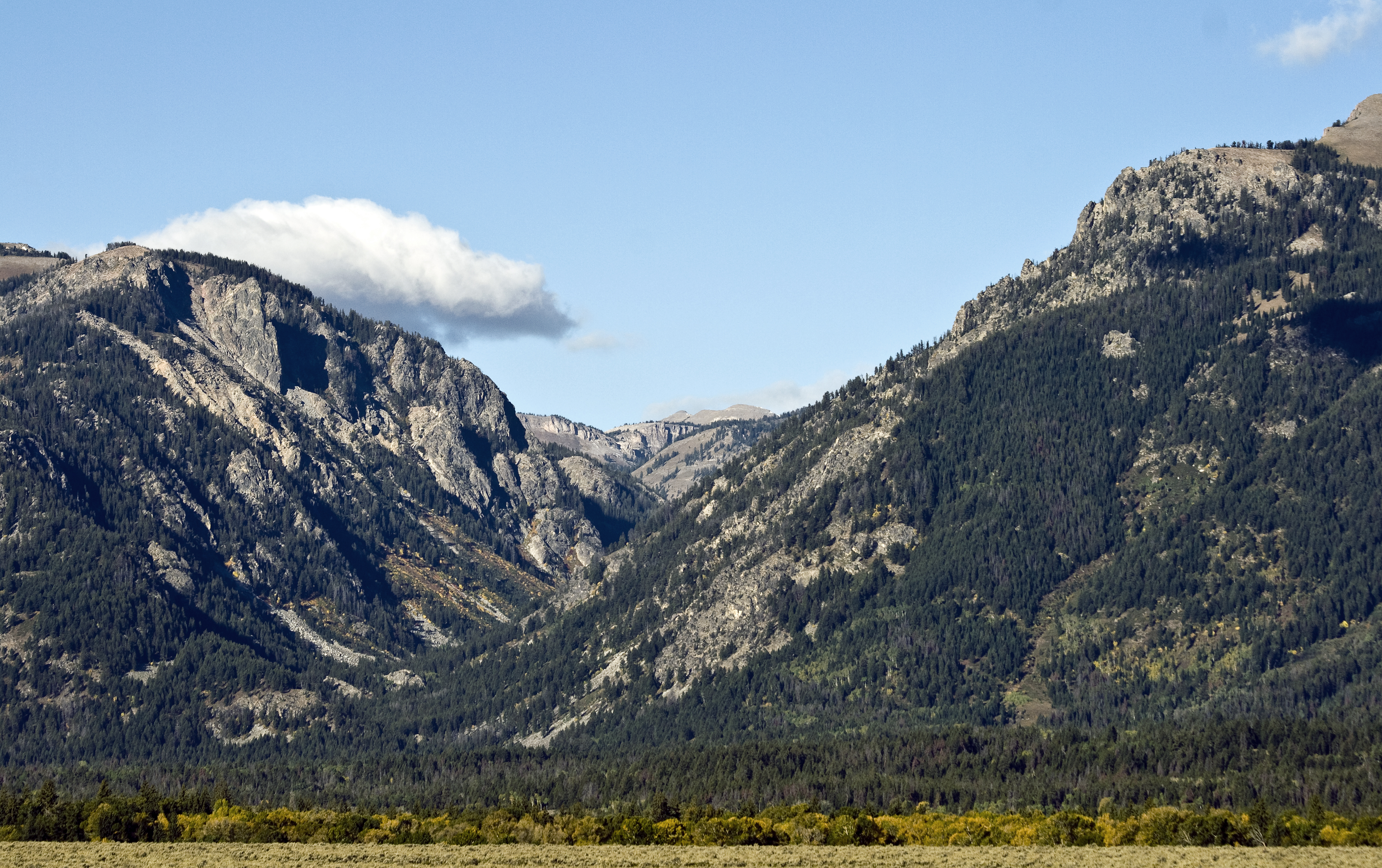
- Granite Canyon from Jackson Hole

Geography
- Country: United States
- State: Wyoming
- County: Teton
- Coordinates: 43°37′05″N 110°49′03″W
- Interactive map of Granite Canyon

Granite Canyon is located in Grand Teton National Park, in the U. S. state of Wyoming. The canyon was formed by glaciers which retreated at the end of the Last Glacial Maximum approximately 15,000 years ago, leaving behind a U-shaped valley. The canyon lies between Rendezvous Mountain to the south and Mount Hunt to the north. The trailhead for the canyon is on the Moose–Wilson Road about 2 miles (3.2 km) north of Teton Village. One of the most popular hikes from the trailhead is to Marion Lake by way of the Granite Canyon Trail which traverses the length of the canyon. Another popular hike involves riding the aerial tram located at the Jackson Hole Mountain Resort in Teton Village to the top of Rendezvous Mountain, and then descending back to Teton Village by way of Granite Canyon. The descent from the summit of Rendezvous Peak back to Teton Village is an often steep one with an altitude loss of 4,100 feet (1,200 m). The historic Upper Granite Canyon Patrol Cabin is situated near the entrance to the canyon and was listed on the National Register of Historic Places in 1998.

Granite Canyon is also the original name of one of the most scenic canyons in Colorado located in Lake George, CO. Now known as ElevenMile Canyon, the Colorado Midland Railroad ran through the canyon from 1887 to 1918. Almost a decade after the rails were removed from the canyon, construction of ElevenMile Reservoir Dam started and was completed in 1931. Today, Granite Canyon is more commonly known as ElevenMile Canyon.

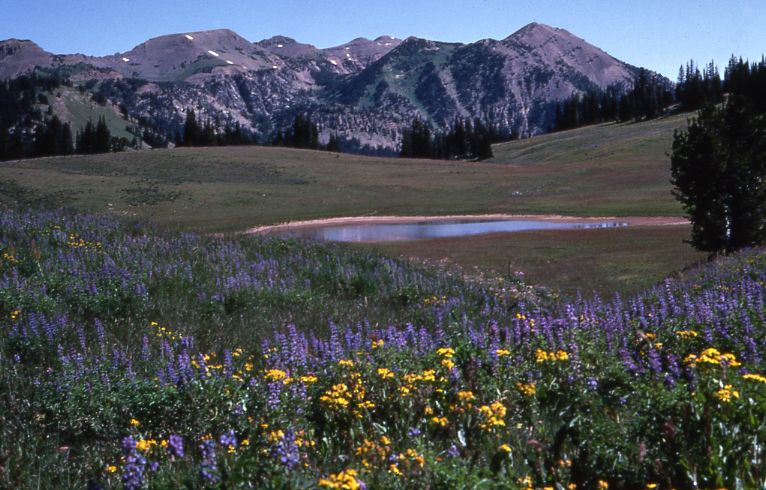
South Fork of Granite Canyon

== See also ==
- Canyons of the Teton Range
- Geology of the Grand Teton area
