= Windy (dinghy) =

Racing class doublehanded dinghy

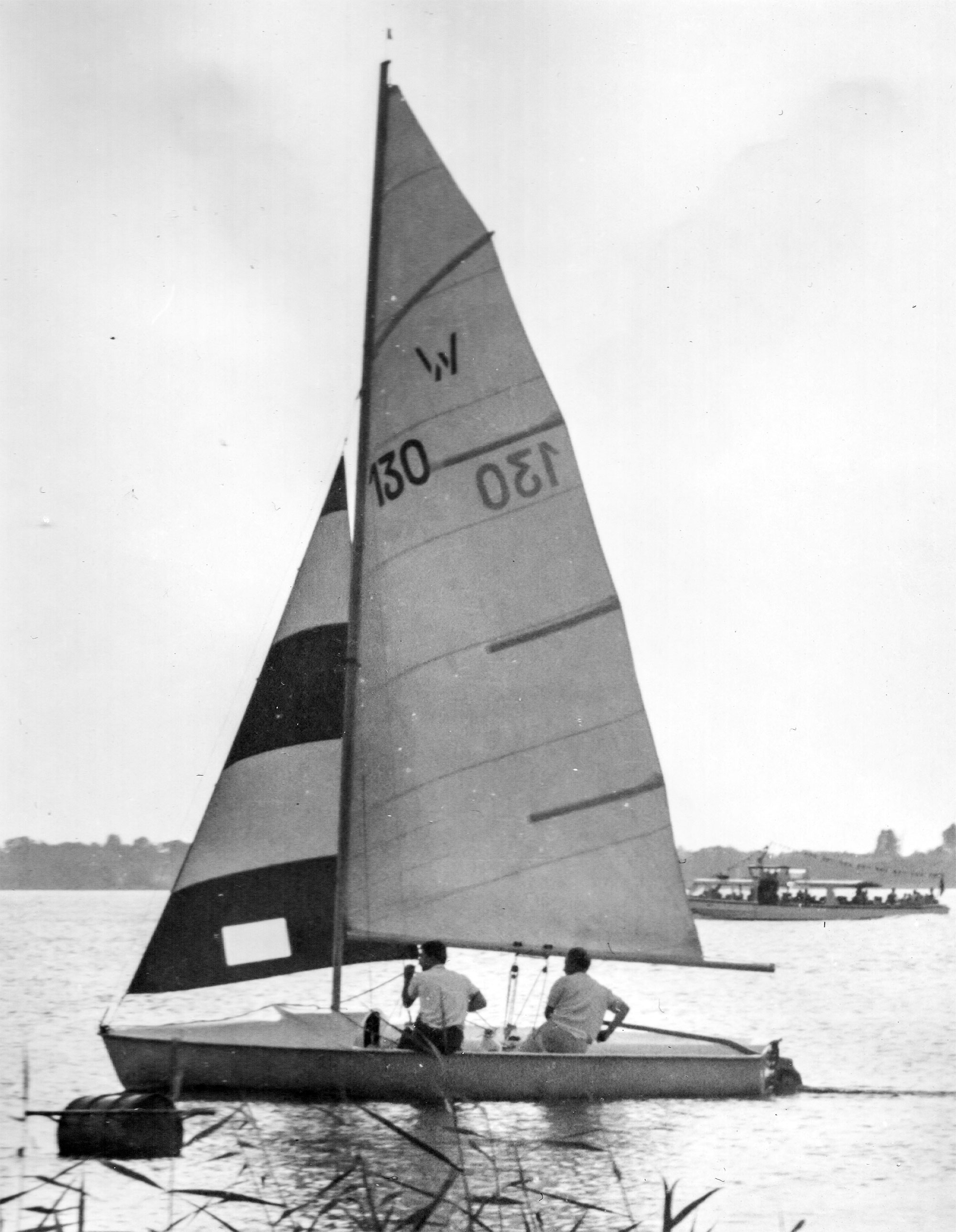

Boat
- Crew: 2
- Draft: 1250 mm

Hull
- Hull weight: 145 kg
- LOA: 5,280 m (17,320 ft)
- Beam: 1,980 m (6,500 ft)

Rig
- Mast height: 7,650 m (25,100 ft)

Sails
- Mainsail area: 11.5 m^{2}
- Spinnaker area: 20 m^{2}

Windy is a French racing class doublehanded dinghy created in 1962–64. Until c. 1989, about 1500–2000 were built. About half were sold in Germany. Races are held yearly, mainly in France and Germany. In 2008 new-produced boats are offered again.

There are four variants:

1. Standard (1962–69), competition and leisure
2. Racing (c. 1969–77), competition and touring
3. Racing S (c. 1977–85?), competition
4. Racing Super (c. 1985–), competition
