= Doane Peak =

Mountain in Wyoming, United States

- Location within Wyoming Location within the United States

Highest point
- Elevation: 11,360 ft (3,460 m)
- Prominence: 1,595 ft (486 m)
- Coordinates: 43°54′41″N 110°46′45″W

Geography
- Location: Grand Teton National Park, Teton County, Wyoming, U.S.
- Parent range: Teton Range
- Topo map: USGS Ranger Peak

Climbing
- First ascent: 1931 (Buckingham)

Doane Peak (11,360 feet (3,460 m)) is in the northern Teton Range, Grand Teton National Park, Wyoming. The peak is located west of and across Jackson Lake from Colter Bay Village. The scenic Waterfalls Canyon is immediately northeast of the peak, but there are no maintained trails there. Access to the summit involves off trail hiking and scrambling as the top of the mountain is more than 4,500 feet (1,400 m) above Jackson Lake. The peak is named for Lt. Gustavus Cheyney Doane.

== Climate ==
Climate data for Doane Peak 43.9112 N, 110.7751 W, Elevation: 10,984 ft (3,348 m) (1991–2020 normals)
Month	Jan	Feb	Mar	Apr	May	Jun	Jul	Aug	Sep	Oct	Nov	Dec	Year
Mean daily maximum °F (°C)	21.9 (−5.6)	21.3 (−5.9)	26.3 (−3.2)	31.7 (−0.2)	41.4 (5.2)	52.0 (11.1)	62.8 (17.1)	62.0 (16.7)	52.4 (11.3)	39.1 (3.9)	27.2 (−2.7)	21.1 (−6.1)	38.3 (3.5)
Daily mean °F (°C)	12.8 (−10.7)	11.4 (−11.4)	15.8 (−9.0)	20.6 (−6.3)	29.6 (−1.3)	39.4 (4.1)	48.8 (9.3)	48.1 (8.9)	39.4 (4.1)	27.8 (−2.3)	18.2 (−7.7)	12.3 (−10.9)	27.0 (−2.8)
Mean daily minimum °F (°C)	3.6 (−15.8)	1.5 (−16.9)	5.3 (−14.8)	9.4 (−12.6)	17.9 (−7.8)	26.7 (−2.9)	34.9 (1.6)	34.3 (1.3)	26.5 (−3.1)	16.6 (−8.6)	9.2 (−12.7)	3.5 (−15.8)	15.8 (−9.0)
Average precipitation inches (mm)	8.28 (210)	7.22 (183)	6.71 (170)	5.92 (150)	5.26 (134)	3.63 (92)	1.54 (39)	1.65 (42)	2.84 (72)	4.20 (107)	6.47 (164)	8.11 (206)	61.83 (1,569)
Source: PRISM Climate Group
