= Frazier Ridge =

Frazier Ridge (79°9′S 86°25′W) is a sharp ridge on the west side of Webster Glacier, extending north from Founders Escarpment to Minnesota Glacier, in the Heritage Range of Antarctica. It was named by the University of Minnesota geological party, 1963–64, for Sergeant Herbert J. Frazier, a radioman with the 62nd Transportation Detachment who was of assistance to the party.

== Features ==
Geographical features include:

- Muir Peak
- Webster Glacier
