= Owl Creek Trail =

Hiking trail in the state of Wyoming

Coordinates: 43°58′41″N 110°50′28″W

- Length: 7.3 mi (11.7 km)
- Location: Teton Range
- Trailheads: Berry Creek Trail; Moose Basin Divide
- Use: Hiking/Pack animals
- Elevation change: Approximate gain of 2,500 ft (760 m)
- Highest point: Moose Basin Divide, 9,718 ft (2,962 m)
- Lowest point: Berry Creek Trail junction, 7,189 ft (2,191 m)
- Difficulty: Strenuous
- Season: Summer to Fall
- Sights: Teton Range
- Hazards: Severe weather Grizzly bears Stream crossings

The Owl Creek Trail is a 7.3-mile (11.7 km) long hiking trail in the far northern region of Grand Teton National Park in the U.S. state of Wyoming.

== Location and geography ==
The trail begins at a junction on the Berry Creek Trail and traverses west then south to Moose Basin Divide where it meets the Webb Canyon Trail. Located in the remote northern backcountry of Grand Teton National Park, the trail is not connected to maintained trails in the southern part of the park and must be accessed from the Glade Creek trailhead in the John D. Rockefeller, Jr. Memorial Parkway. From Glade Creek, it is a 7.5 mi (12.1 km) hike to the Berry Creek Trail and then another 4 mi (6.4 km) to the trail junction. The Owl Creek Trail follows Owl Creek west then south and passes south of Forellen Peak. The trail requires numerous stream crossings which can be dangerous during spring melt.

== See also ==
List of hiking trails in Grand Teton National Park
