= Mount Hunt Divide =

Mountain pass in Wyoming, United States

- Location within Wyoming
- Elevation: 9,698 feet (2,956 m)
- Traversed by: Open Canyon Trail

Third Approach
- Location: Teton County, Wyoming, US
- Range: Teton Range, Rocky Mountains
- Coordinates: 43°37′46″N 110°51′02″W
- Topo map: USGS Grand Teton, WY

Mount Hunt Divide is a pedestrian mountain pass located in the Teton Range, Grand Teton National Park, in the U.S. state of Wyoming. Access to Mount Hunt Divide involves a 7.3 miles (11.7 km) hike along the Open Canyon Trail, which is accessed from the Death Canyon trailhead. The pass is just east of Mount Hunt and both were named after William Price Hunt.
