= Windy (nickname) =

Windy is the nickname of:

- Richard Gale (British Army officer) (1896–1982), British Army general
- Windy McCall (1925–2015), American former Major League Baseball relief pitcher John William McCall
- Tom O'Neill (ice hockey) (1923–1973), Canadian National Hockey League player
- Brian Windhorst (born 1978), American sportswriter
- Windy White, American college football player in the early 1920s
- Windy Zhan (born 2006), Hong Kong female Cantopop singer and actress
