= Waterfalls Canyon =

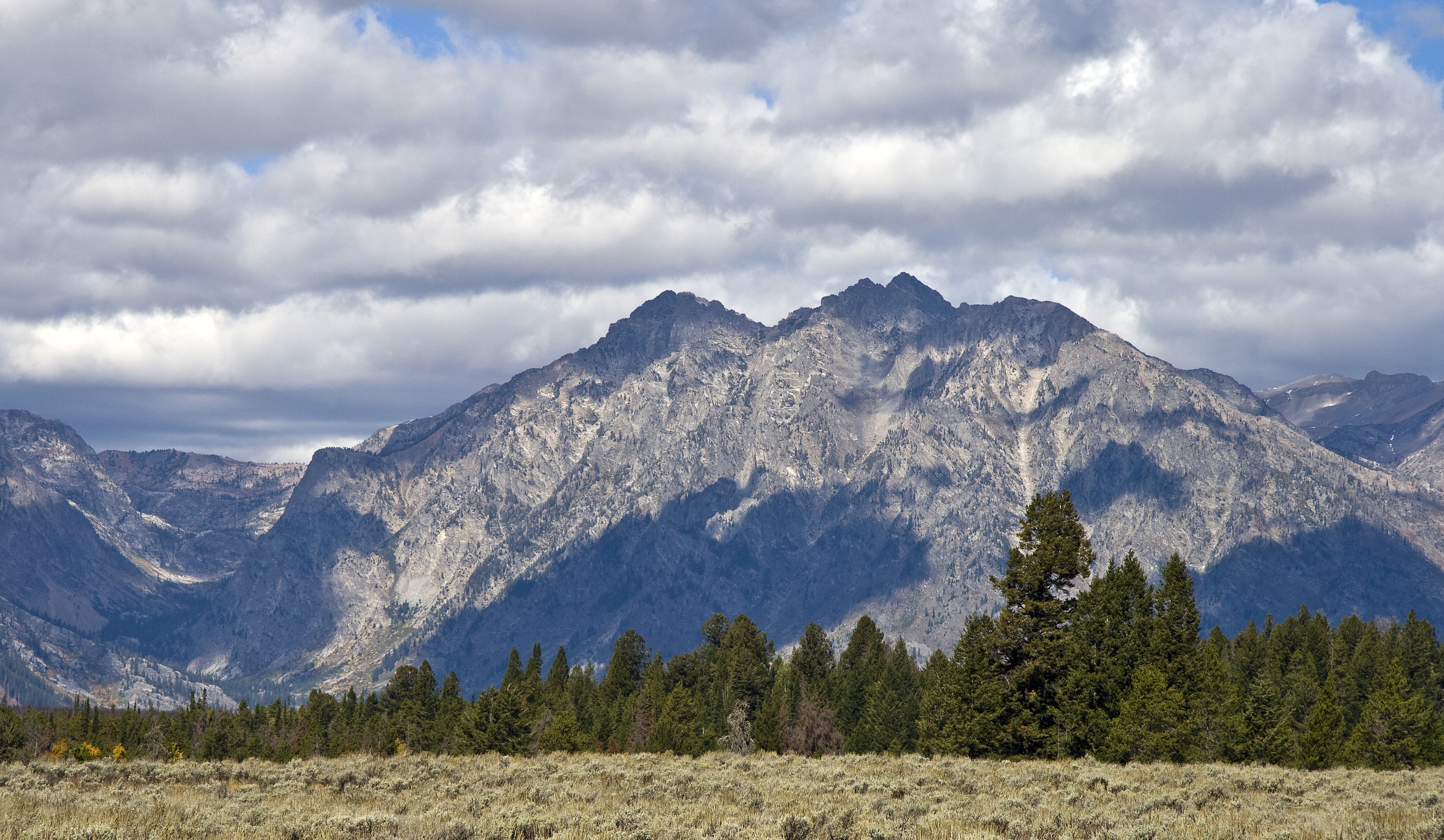
- Waterfalls Canyon at far right with Eagles Rest Peak at center

Geography
- Country: United States
- State: Wyoming
- County: Teton
- Coordinates: 43°46′37″N 109°50′29″W
- Lake: Jackson Lake
- Interactive map of Waterfalls Canyon

Waterfalls Canyon is located in Grand Teton National Park, in the U. S. state of Wyoming. The canyon was formed by glaciers which retreated at the end of the Last Glacial Maximum approximately 15,000 years ago, leaving behind a U-shaped valley. Waterfalls Canyon is south of Ranger Peak and north of Eagles Rest Peak and the entrance to the canyon is along the western shore of Jackson Lake, directly across the lake from the Colter Bay Village. There are several cascades in the canyon, including Wilderness Falls and Columbine Cascade, which descend from an unnamed lake below Ranger Peak.

== See also ==
- Canyons of the Teton Range
- Geology of the Grand Teton area
