= Founders Peaks =

Mountains in Antarctica

Coordinates: 79°10′S 86°15′W

The Founders Peaks are a cluster of sharp peaks and ridges located just east of Founders Escarpment and between Minnesota Glacier and Gowan Glacier, in the Heritage Range of the Ellsworth Mountains in Antarctica. The peaks were mapped by the United States Geological Survey from surveys and U.S. Navy air photos, 1961–66. The name was applied by the Advisory Committee on Antarctic Names is association with the name Heritage Range.

== See also ==
- Mountains in Antarctica

Geographical features include:

=== Smith Ridge ===
- Pardue Peak

=== Other features ===
- Gowan Glacier
- Minnesota Glacier
- Muir Peak
- Pipe Peak
- Reuther Nunataks
- Webster Glacier
- Welcome Nunatak
- Windy Peak
