= Windy Hill =

Windy Hill or Windy Hills may refer to:

== Places ==
- Windy Hill, Essendon, an Australian rules football ground in the Melbourne area
- Windy Hill Wind Farm, a wind power station near Ravenshoe, Queensland, Australia
- Windy Hill (Pennines), a hill on the Pennines which marks the border between Greater Manchester and West Yorkshire, England
- Windy Hill, Kilmacolm, a house in Scotland
- Windy Hill, Renfrewshire, Scotland, a hill
- Windy Hill, Isle of Bute, Scotland
- Windy Hill Open Space Preserve, a regional park in the San Francisco Bay Area
- Windy Hills, Kentucky
- Windy Hill, a mountain in Madison County, Montana
- Windy Hill Beach, one of four communities merged to form North Myrtle Beach, South Carolina
- Constantine Sneed House, Williamson County, Tennessee, also known as "Windy Hill", on the U.S. National Register of Historic Places

== Other ==
- The Windy Hill, a 1921 children's novel by Cornelia Meigs
