= Windy Point =

Windy Point may refer to:

== United States ==
- Windy Point, Arizona
- Windy Point, Sierra Nevada, California
- Windy Point, Morgan Territory, California
- Windy Point, Los Gatos, California
- Windy Point, El Paso County, Colorado
- Windy Point, Conejos County, Colorado
- Windy Point, Oregon
- Windy Point, Puget Sound, Washington

== Other places ==
- Windy Point, Adelaide, Australia
- Windy Point, Alberta, Canada
- Windy Point, Te Kuha, South Island, New Zealand

== See also ==
- Windy Point/Windy Flats, a wind farm in Goldendale, Washington
