= Reuther Nunataks =

Mountain in Antarctica

Reuther Nunataks (79°10′S 85°57′W) is a ridgelike line of nunataks 4 nautical miles (7 km) long, located 3 nautical miles (6 km) west of Landmark Peak in the Founders Peaks, Heritage Range. Named by the University of Minnesota Geological Party to these mountains, 1963–64, for Charles J. Reuther, who served that season as helicopter technical representative with the 62nd Transportation Detachment.
