= Moose Basin Divide =

- Location within Wyoming
- Elevation: 9,718 ft (2,962 m)
- Traversed by: Webb Canyon Trail; Owl Creek Trail

Third Approach
- Location: Teton County, Wyoming, United States
- Range: Teton Range, Rocky Mountains
- Coordinates: 43°57′23″N 110°50′35″W
- Topo map: USGS Ranger Peak, WY

Moose Basin Divide is a pedestrian mountain pass located in the Teton Range, Grand Teton National Park, in the U.S. state of Wyoming. The divide is situated at 9,718 ft (2,962 m) above sea level and is accessed by way of the Webb Canyon Trail from the south or the Owl Creek Trail from the north. From Wilcox Point on Jackson Lake, Moose Basin Divide is a 9.1 mi (14.6 km) one way trip by way of the Webb Canyon Trail. The divide is located in a less visited region of the park and the trails cross streams that do not have foot bridges.
