= Moran Canyon (Wyoming) =

Canyon in Grand Teton National Park, Wyoming, United States

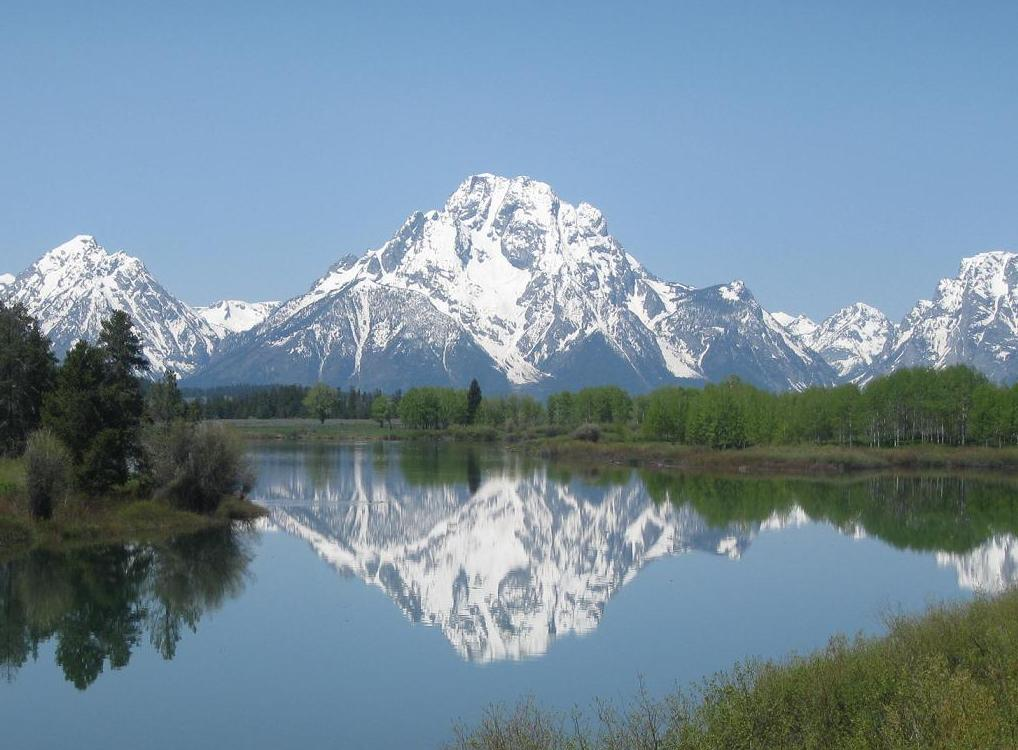
- Mount Moran at center with Moran Canyon to the right

Geography
- Country: United States
- State: Wyoming
- County: Teton
- Coordinates: 43°51′41″N 110°45′17″W
- Lake: Jackson Lake
- Interactive map of Moran Canyon

This is about the canyon in Wyoming, United States. For the canyon on the Fraser River, in British Columbia, Canada, see Moran, British Columbia.

Moran Canyon is located in Grand Teton National Park, in the U. S. state of Wyoming. The canyon lies between Mount Moran to the south and Traverse Peak and Bivouac Peak to the north. Moran Bay, part of Jackson Lake, is at the mouth of the canyon to the east. The canyon was formed by glaciers which retreated at the end of the Last Glacial Maximum approximately 15,000 years ago.

== See also ==
- Canyons of the Teton Range
- Geology of the Grand Teton area
