= Eagles Rest Peak =

Mountain in Wyoming, United States

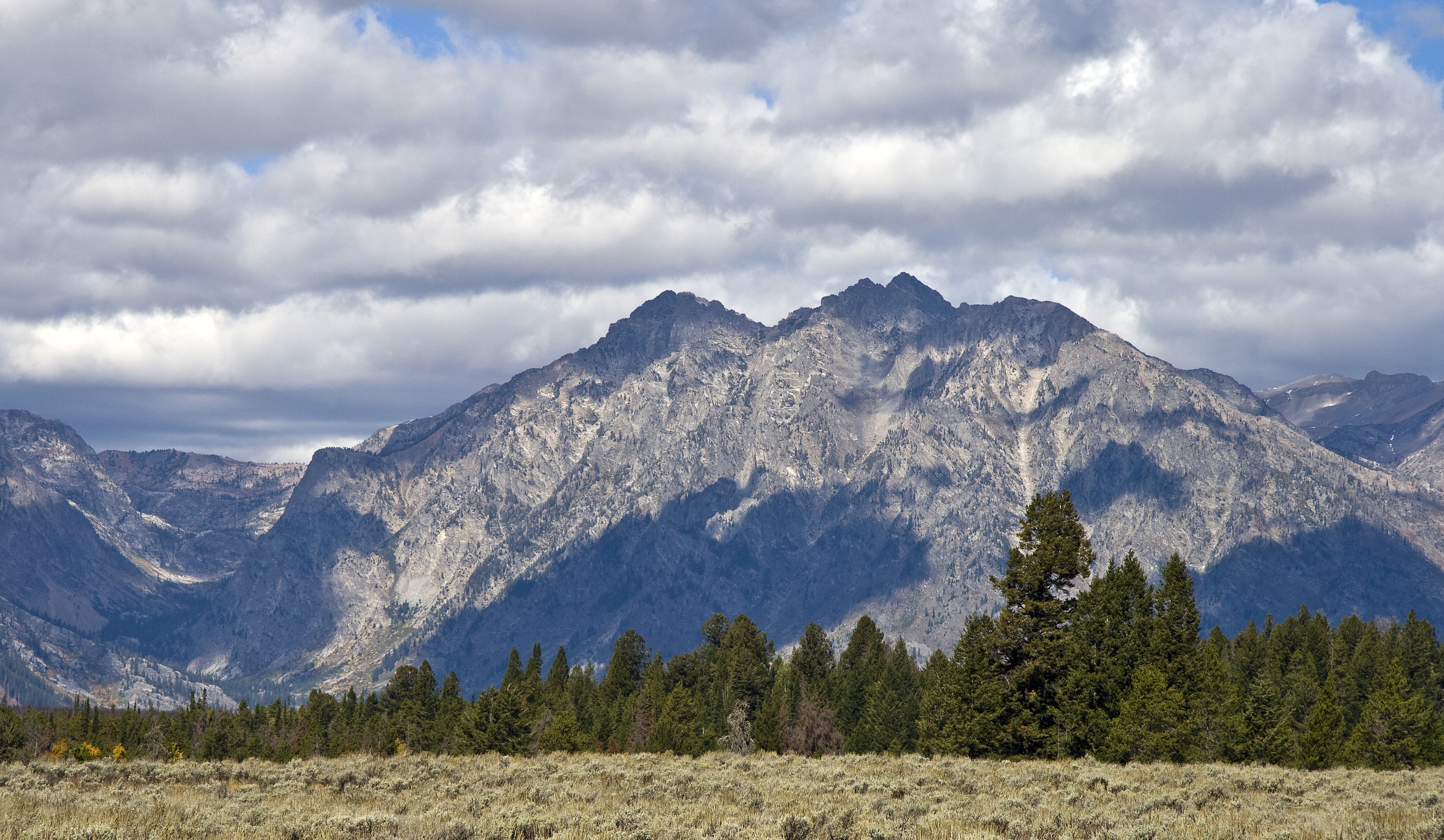
- Eagles Rest Peak

Highest point
- Elevation: 11,263 ft (3,433 m)
- Prominence: 458 ft (140 m)
- Coordinates: 43°54′00″N 110°45′33″W

Geography
- Location within Wyoming Location within the United States
- Location: Grand Teton National Park, Teton County, Wyoming, U.S.
- Parent range: Teton Range
- Topo map: USGS Ranger Peak

Eagles Rest Peak (11,263 feet (3,433 m)) is in the northern Teton Range, Grand Teton National Park, Wyoming. The peak is located west of and across Jackson Lake from Colter Bay Village. The peak rises dramatically almost 4,500 feet (1,400 m) above Jackson Lake in less than 1 mile (1.6 km). Waterfalls Canyon is to the north of the peak and Snowshoe Canyon lies to the south.

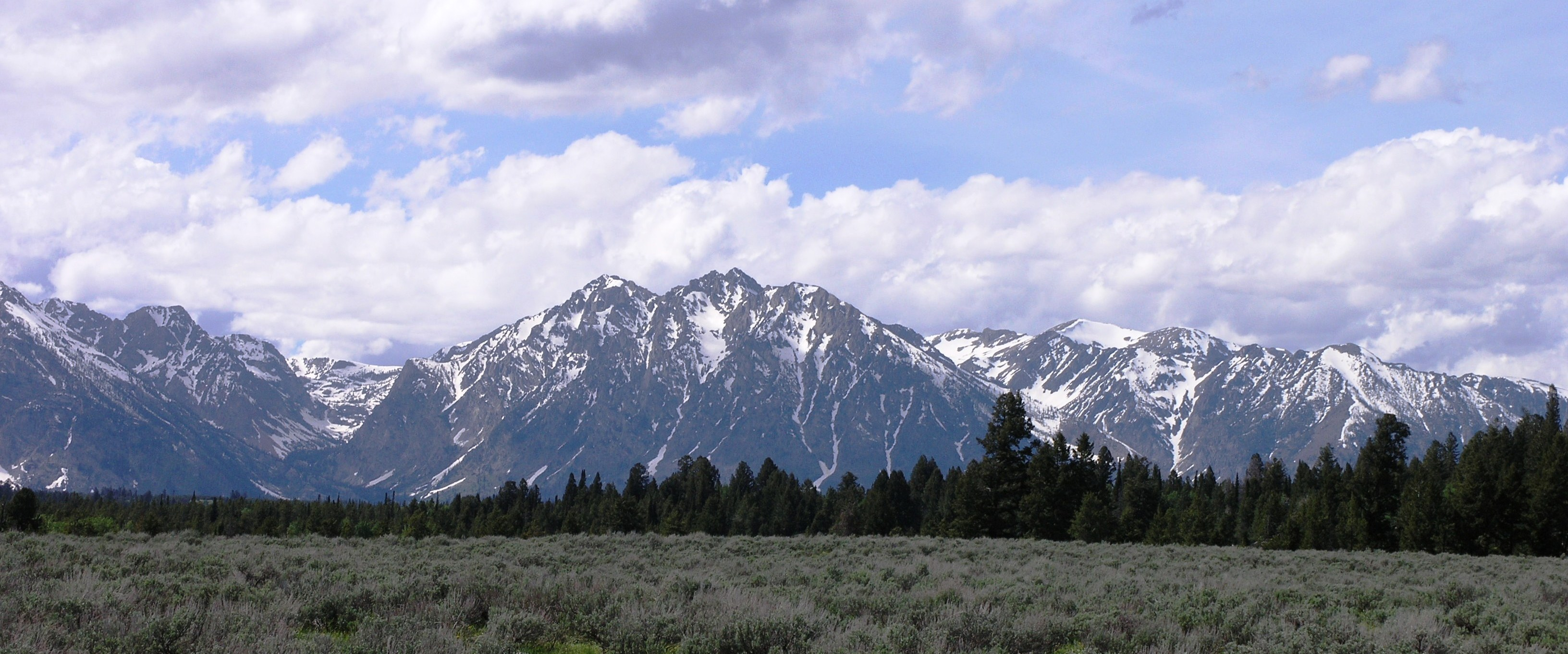
Eagles Rest Peak at center
