= Ranger Peak (Wyoming) =

Mountain in Wyoming, USA

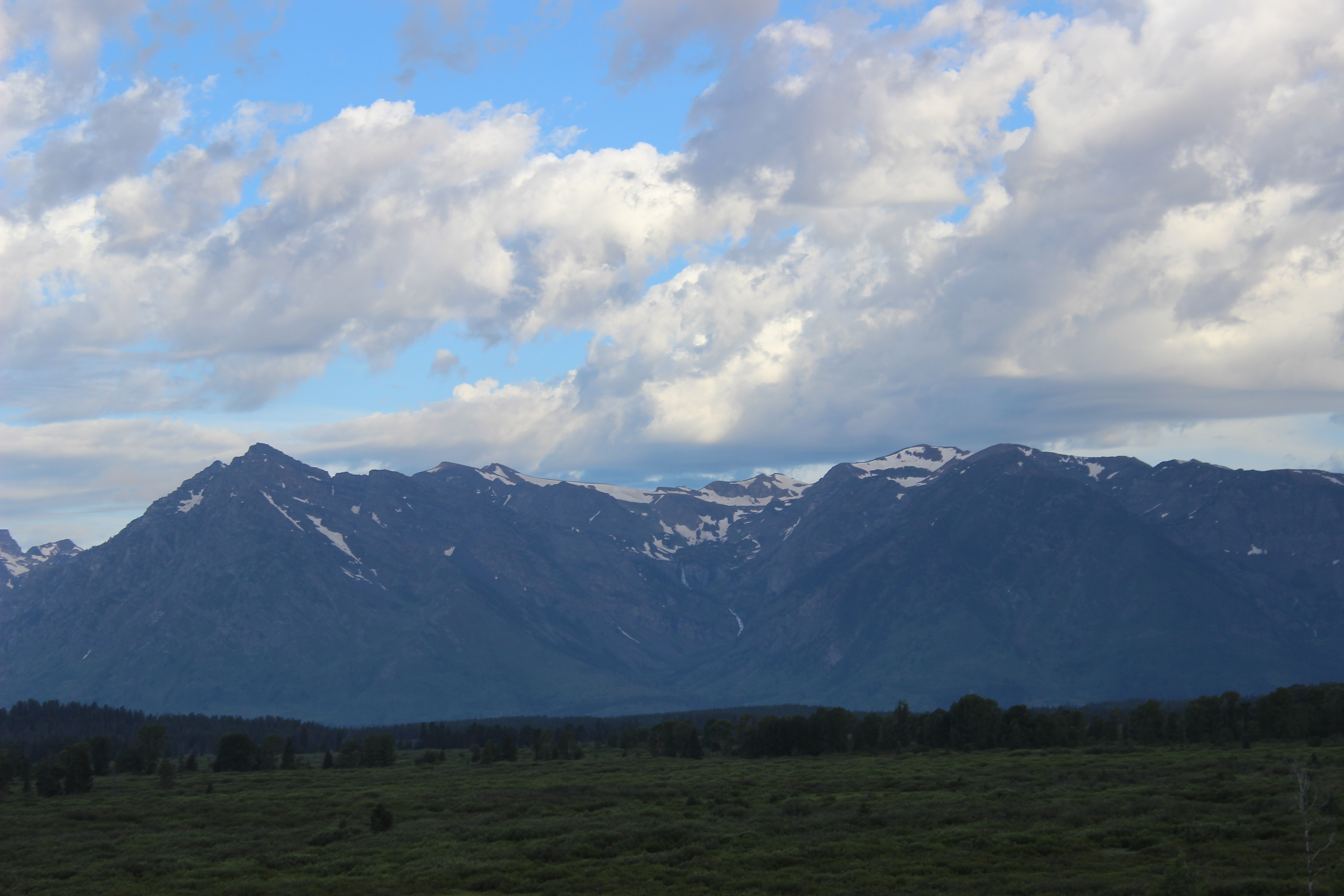
- Ranger Peak is the snow covered mountain at right while Eagles Rest Peak is at left. Waterfalls Canyon lies between the two mountains.

Highest point
- Elevation: 11,360 ft (3,460 m)
- Prominence: 1,595 ft (486 m)
- Coordinates: 43°55′43″N 110°45′49″W

Geography
- Location within Wyoming Location within the United States
- Location: Grand Teton National Park, Teton County, Wyoming, U.S.
- Parent range: Teton Range
- Topo map: USGS Ranger Peak

Ranger Peak (11,360 feet (3,460 m)) is in the northern Teton Range, Grand Teton National Park, Wyoming. The peak is located slightly northwest of and across Jackson Lake from Colter Bay Village. Colter Canyon is to the north while Waterfalls Canyon is immediately southeast of the peak, but there are no maintained trails in the area. Access to the summit involves off trail hiking and scrambling. The top of the mountain is more than 4,500 feet (1,400 m) above Jackson Lake.

On March 7, 2012, Chris Onufer and Steve Romeo, both local residents and considered expert skiers, were killed by an avalanche on Ranger Peak. The avalanche originated in a couloir on the north side of Waterfalls Canyon at the 10,300 ft (3,100 m) level and traveled more than 3,000 ft (910 m) down the mountain slope into the canyon.
