= Mount Hunt (Wyoming) =

Mountain in Wyoming, United States

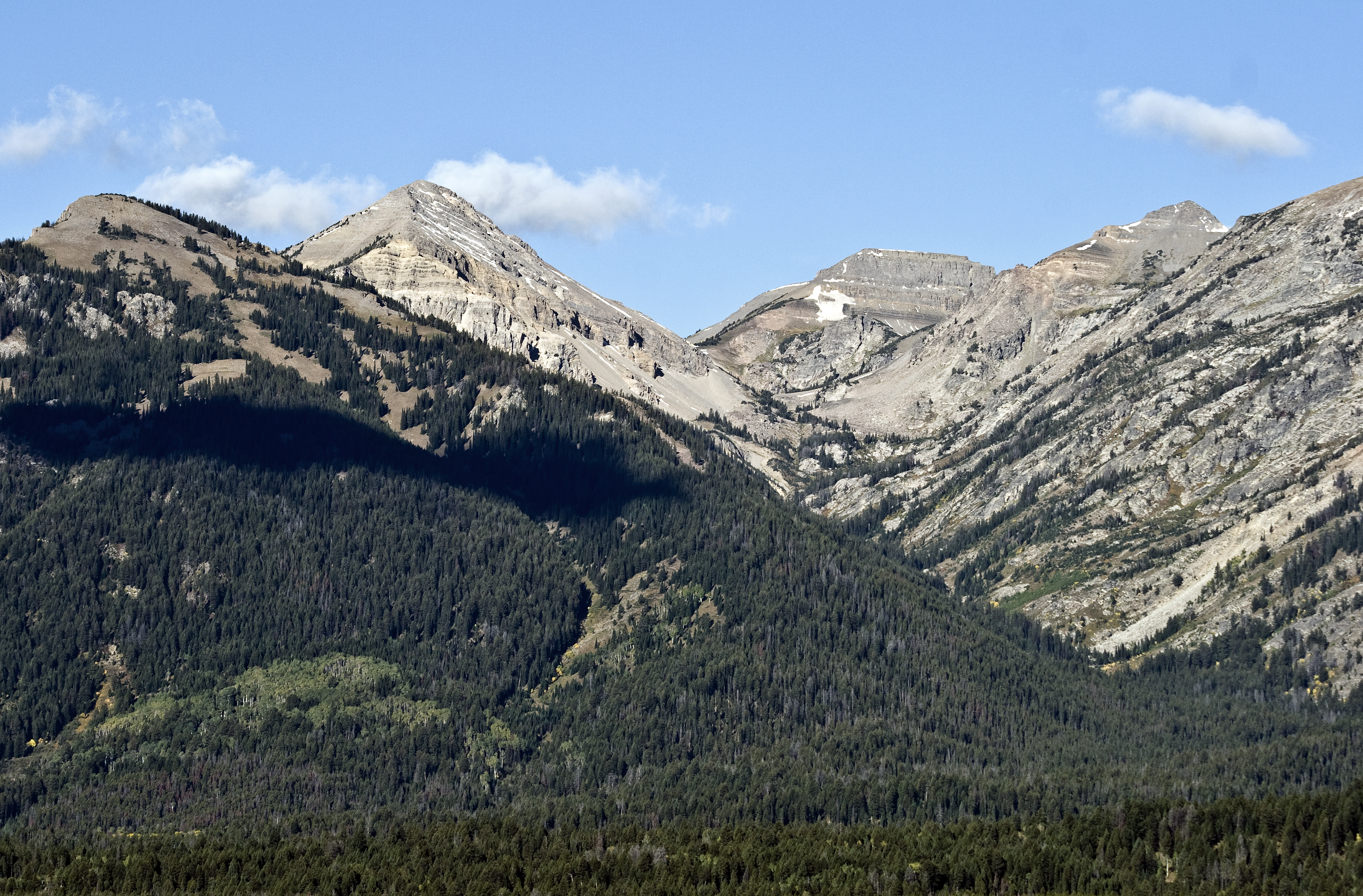
- Open Canyon with Mount Hunt at center left

Highest point
- Elevation: 10,788 ft (3,288 m)
- Prominence: 623 ft (190 m)
- Coordinates: 43°37′52″N 110°51′41″W

Geography
- Location within Wyoming Location within the United States
- Location: Grand Teton National Park, Teton County, Wyoming, U.S.
- Parent range: Teton Range
- Topo map: USGS Grand Teton

Climbing
- First ascent: August 24, 1929 (Fritiof Fryxell)
- Easiest route: Scramble

Mount Hunt (10,788 feet (3,288 m) is located in the Teton Range, Grand Teton National Park in the U.S. state of Wyoming. The peak is situated near the head of Open Canyon and just west of Mount Hunt Divide. The peak was named after William Price Hunt, one of the leaders of the 1811-12 Astor Expedition.
