= Bivouac Peak =

Mountain in Wyoming, United States

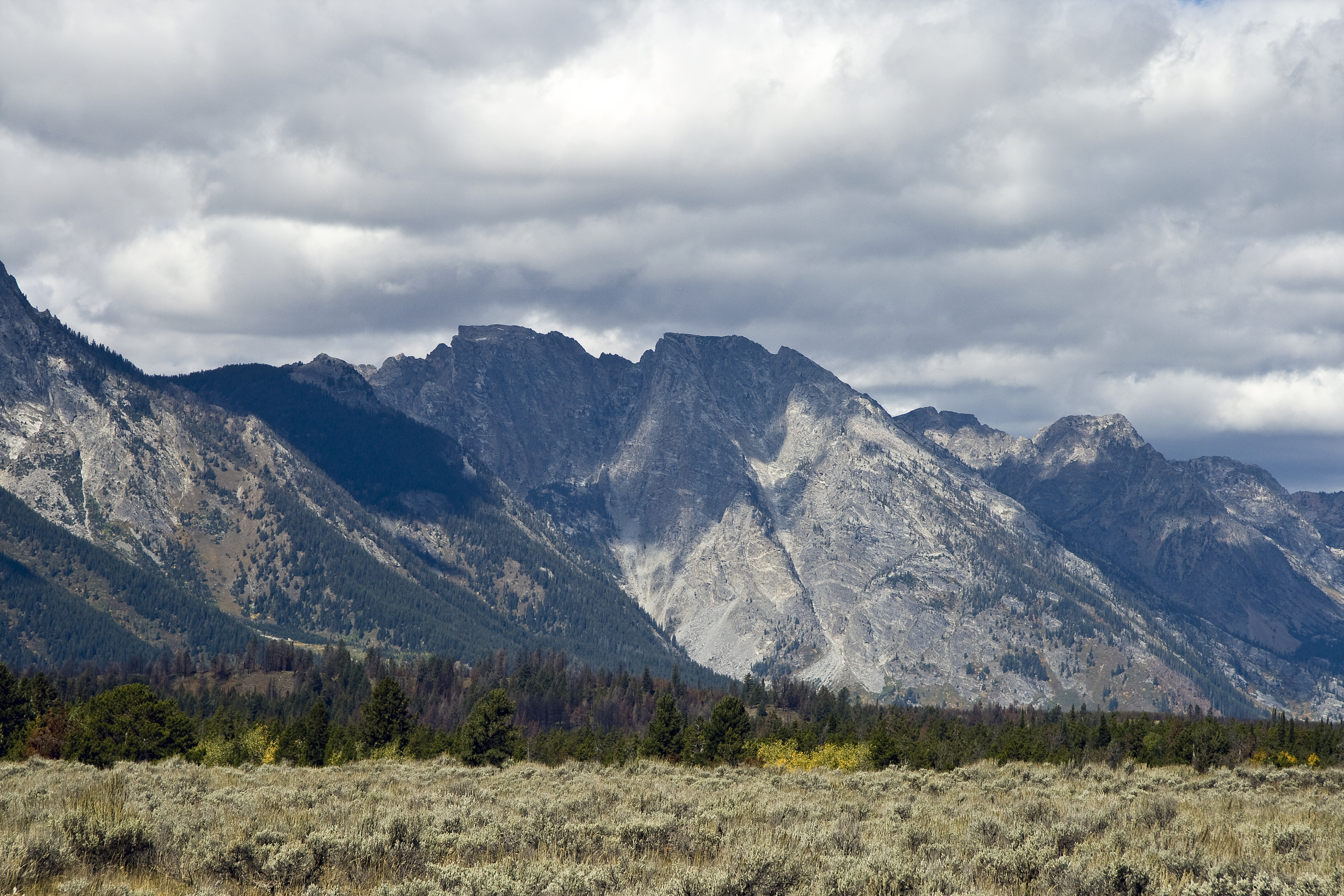
- Bivouac Peak at center right from Jackson Hole

Highest point
- Elevation: 10,830 ft (3,300 m)
- Prominence: 265 ft (81 m)
- Coordinates: 43°52′08″N 110°47′03″W

Geography
- Location within Wyoming Location within the United States
- Location: Grand Teton National Park, Teton County, Wyoming, U.S.
- Parent range: Teton Range
- Topo map: USGS Mount Moran

Climbing
- First ascent: Fryxell 1930
- Easiest route: Scramble

Bivouac Peak (10,830 feet (3,300 m)) is in the northern Teton Range, Grand Teton National Park, Wyoming. The peak is located immediately to the west of Moran Bay on Jackson Lake, and rises more than 4,000 ft (1,200 m) in less than 0.5 mi (0.80 km) from the lakeshore. Moran Canyon is situated to the south of the mountain and Snowshoe Canyon lies to the north.
