= Pioneer Heights =

Coordinates: 79°30′S 83°30′W

Pioneer Heights is a group name in the Heritage Range, Ellsworth Mountains, encompassing the large area of hills, ridges and peaks located eastward of Schneider and Schanz Glaciers and between Splettstoesser and Union Glaciers. Among these features are the Inferno Ridge, the Nimbus Hills, Gross, Buchanan and Collier Hills. The Pioneer Heights were mapped by the United States Geological Survey (USGS) from ground surveys and U.S. Navy air photos from 1961 to 1966. The name was applied by the Advisory Committee on Antarctic Names (US-ACAN) in association with the name Heritage Range.

== See also ==
- Mountains in Antarctica

Geographical features include:

=== Gross Hills ===
- Courtney Peak
- Flanagan Glacier
- Rosen Peak
- Schmidt Glacier
- Ziegler Point

=== Inferno Ridge ===
- Larson Valley
- Orheim Point
- Rennell Glacier
- Schneider Glacier

=== Nimbus Hills ===
==== Samuel Nunataks ====
- Higgins Nunatak

==== Other Nimbus Hills features ====
- Flanagan Glacier
- Mount Capley
- Warren Nunatak

=== Other features ===
- Buchanan Hills
- Collier Hills
- Donald Ridge
- Flanagan Glacier
- Johnson Neck
- Mount Sporli
- Mount Virginia
- Rennell Glacier
- Ronald Ridge
- Schmidt Glacier (Antarctica)
- Thompson Escarpment
- Union Glacier
