= Lists of places in Antarctica =

- Coordinates: 80°S 90°E
- Area: Ranked 2nd (unofficially)
  - Total: 14,000,000 km^{2} (5,400,000 sq mi)
  - Land: 100%
  - Water: 0%
- Coastline: 17,968 km (11,165 mi)
- Borders: No land boundaries
- Highest point: Vinson Massif, 4,897 m (16,066 ft)
- Lowest point: Bentley Subglacial Trench, −2,555 m (−8,382.5 ft)
- Longest river: Onyx River, 25 km
- Largest lake: Lake Vostok, 26,000 sq m (est.)
- Climate: subantarctic to antarctic
- Terrain: ice and barren rock
- Natural resources: krill, fin fish, crab
- Natural hazards: high winds, blizzards, cyclonic storms, volcanism
- Environmental issues: depleting ozone layer, rising sea level

Antarctica is the southernmost continent on Earth. While Antarctica has never had a permanent human population, it has been explored by various groups, and many locations on and around the continent have been described. This page lists notable places in and immediately surrounding the Antarctic continent, including geographic features, bodies of water, and human settlements.

== Bodies of water ==
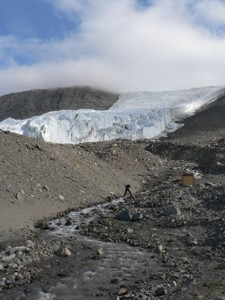
Antarctic melt stream

Antarctica is a desert, receiving very little annual precipitation. However meltwater from the continent's ice features produce a number of rivers and streams. A list of these can be found at List of rivers of Antarctica

== Ice ==
Nearly all of Antarctica's surface is covered by ice to an average depth of 1.9 km (1.2 mi; 6,200 ft). As such, a number of notable ice features have been described on the continent.

=== Ice shelves ===
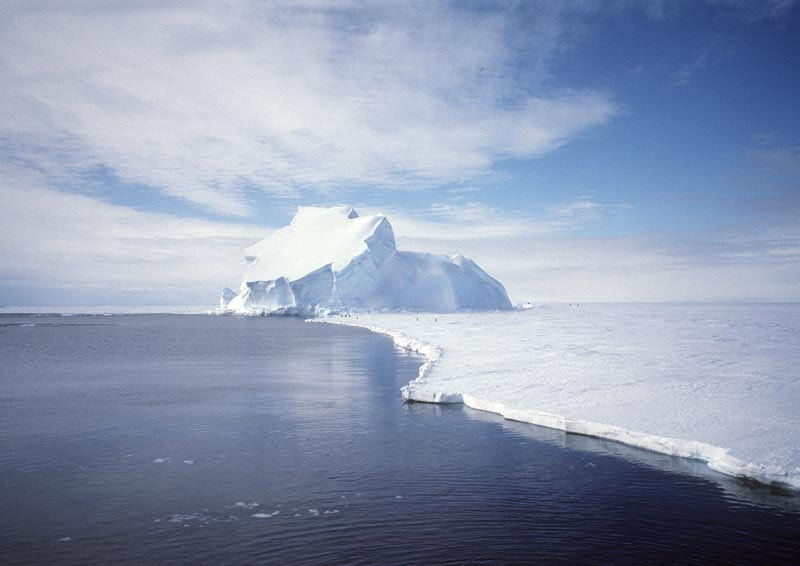
The Riiser-Larsen Ice Shelf.

In many places, continental ice sheets extend from the continent forming massive ice shelves.

A list of Antarctic ice shelves can be found at List of Antarctic ice shelves.

== Islands ==
A large number of islands surround Antarctica. For a list of them, see List of Antarctic and subantarctic islands.

== Geographic features ==
=== Ridges and rock features ===
- Austranten Rock
- Avalanche Corrie

=== Mountains and hills ===
There are a number of mountain lists for Antarctica:

- List of mountains of Enderby Land
- List of mountains of Wilkes Land
- List of mountains of Queen Maud Land
- List of mountains of East Antarctica
- List of Ultras of Antarctica
- List of mountains of Princess Elizabeth Land
- List of mountains of Mac. Robertson Land

To be added to lists are:

- Alexander Peak, Haines Mountains, Ford Ranges, Marie Byrd Land
- Atwater Hill
- Brand Peak
- Buennagel Peak, Haines Mountains, Ford Ranges, Marie Byrd Land
- Buettner Peak, Mount Murphy massif, Marie Byrd Land
- Buggisch Peak, Edson Hills, in the Heritage Range, Ellsworth Mountains, Marie Byrd Land.
- Lester Peak, Edson Hills, in the Heritage Range, Ellsworth Mountains, Marie Byrd Land.
- Mount Arrowsmith
- Mount Atholl
- Mount Axtell
- Mount Boda
- Mount Bodys
- Mount Brading
- Mount Murphy massif, Bucher Peak, Marie Byrd Land
- Mount Byerly, Marie Byrd Land
- Pirrit Hills

=== Volcanoes ===
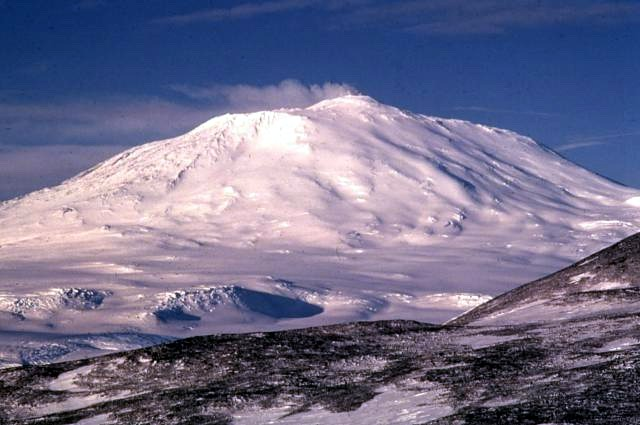
Mount Erebus, the second-highest volcano in Antarctica

Antarctica has a number of active and extinct volcanoes. For a list of them, see List of volcanoes in Antarctica.

== Human settlements ==
Antarctica has very few permanent human population centers, including two civilian bases. Most settlements, however, are not permanent and are lighthouses and research stations.

=== Permanent Urban Settlements ===
Esperanza Base (Permanent base with civilian presence).

Villa Las Estrellas (Permanent base with civilian presence). (Village).
