= Herrington (disambiguation) =

Herrington is an area in the south of Sunderland, England.

Herrington may also refer to:

- Herrington (surname), a surname
- Herrington Lake, an artificial lake in Kentucky, United States
- Herrington Hill, a hill of the Biscoe Islands, Antarctica

== See also ==
- Herington, a surname
