= Ronald Ridge =

Ridge in Antarctica

Ronald Ridge (79°37′S 83°20′W) is a narrow ridge, 5 nautical miles (9 km) long, located 1 nautical mile (1.9 km) west of Donald Ridge, which it resembles, in the Pioneer Heights, Heritage Range, Antarctica.

Mapped by United States Geological Survey (USGS) from surveys and U.S. Navy air photos, 1961–66. Named by Advisory Committee on Antarctic Names (US-ACAN) for Ronald C. Taylor, meteorologist at Little America V Station in 1957.
