= Schanz Glacier =

Glacier in Antarctica

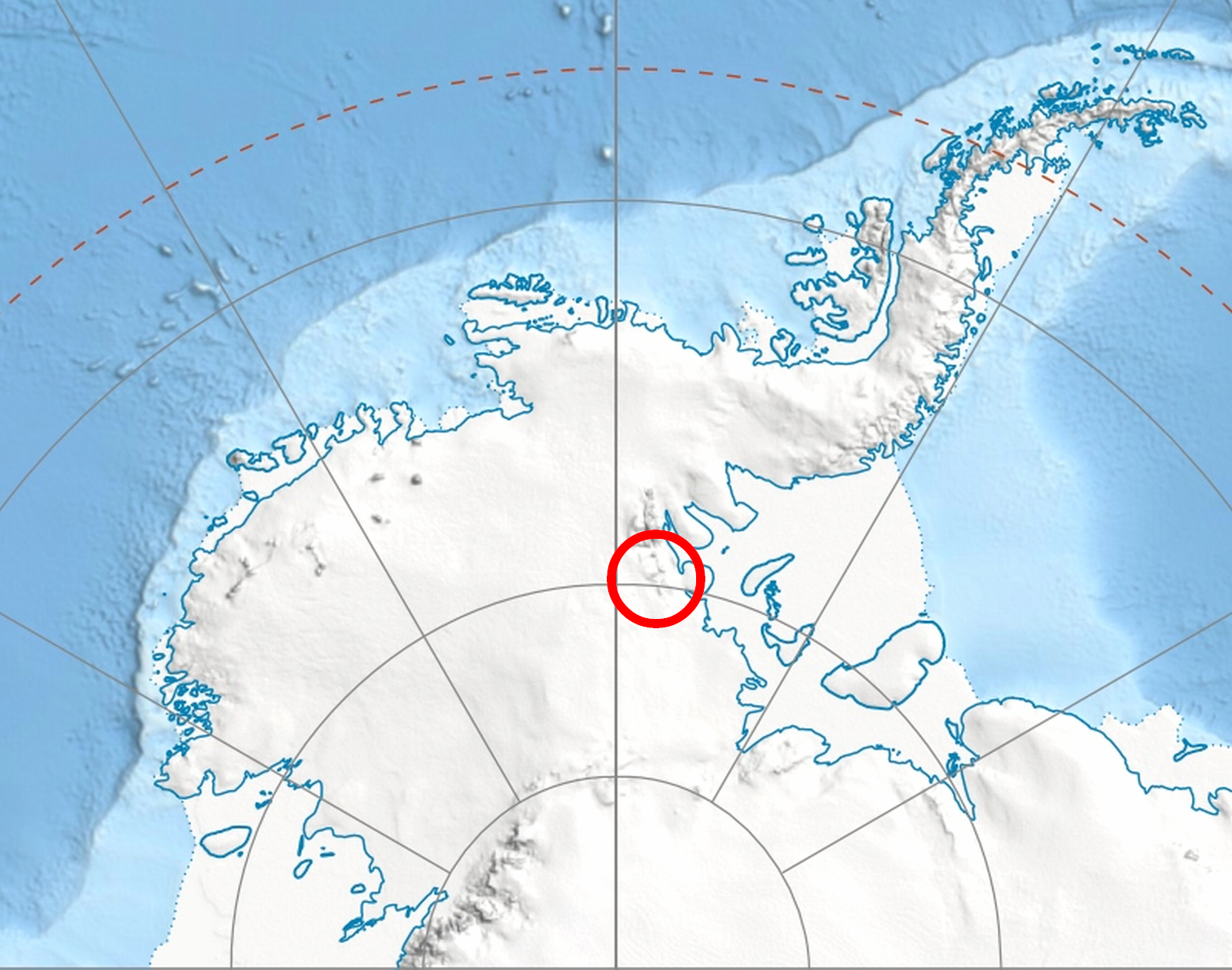
- Location of Heritage Range in Western Antarctica

- Location within Antarctica
- Type: tributary
- Location: Ellsworth Land
- Coordinates: 72°28′00″S 96°09′00″W
- Length: 8 nautical miles (15 km; 9.2 mi)
- Thickness: unknown
- Terminus: Union Glacier
- Status: unknown

Schanz Glacier (79°45′S 83°40′W) is a glacier 8 nautical miles (15 km; 9.2 mi) long in the Heritage Range, draining south between Soholt Peaks and Collier Hills to enter Union Glacier. It was mapped by United States Geological Survey (USGS) from surveys and U.S. Navy air photos in 1961 to 1966. It was named by Advisory Committee on Antarctic Names (US-ACAN) for Lieutenant Commander Thomas L. Schanz, supply officer with U.S. Navy Squadron VX-6 during Deep Freeze in 1965.

== See also ==
- Glaciology
- List of glaciers in the Antarctic
