= Courtney Peak =

Courtney Peak may refer to:

- Courtney Peak (Antarctica)
- Courtney Peak (Washington)
