= Schmidt Glacier =

Schmidt Glacier may refer to:

- Schmidt Glacier (Antarctica)
- Schmidt Glacier (Heard Island and McDonald Islands)
