= Flanagan Glacier =

Glacier in Antarctica

- Location within Antarctica
- Location: Ellsworth Land
- Coordinates: 79°29′S 82°42′W
- Thickness: unknown
- Terminus: Union Glacier
- Status: unknown

Flanagan Glacier (79°29′S 82°42′W) is a glacier in the Pioneer Heights of the Heritage Range, Antarctica, draining east from Thompson Escarpment between the Gross Hills and the Nimbus Hills to the confluent ice at the lower end of Union Glacier. It was mapped by the United States Geological Survey from surveys and U.S. Navy air photos, 1961–66, and was named by the Advisory Committee on Antarctic Names for Lieutenant Walter B. Flanagan, an assistant maintenance officer with U.S. Navy Squadron VX-6 at McMurdo Station during Operation Deep Freeze 1963 and 1964.

== See also ==
- List of glaciers in the Antarctic
- Glaciology
