= Kosco =

Kosco may refer to:

- Kosco Glacier, a glacier flowing from the Anderson Heights vicinity of the Bush Mountains to the Ross Ice Shelf of Antarctica
- Kosco Peak, a rock peak in the Edson Hills, Ellsworth Mountains in Antarctica

== People ==
- Andy Kosco, American baseball player
- John Kosco, front man of the band Dropbox
- Louis F. Kosco, American politician
- Kosco, a graffiti artist featured in the documentary film Style Wars

== See also ==
- Bart Kosko, academic
- Cosco
- Costco
