= Kosco Peak =

Peak in the Edson Hills, Antarctica

Kosco Peak (79°47′S 83°46′W) is a prominent rock peak in the northern part of the Edson Hills, rising to about 1,650 metres (5,400 ft) between Drake Icefall and Hyde Glacier, in the Heritage Range, Ellsworth Mountains, Antarctica. It was mapped by the United States Geological Survey (USGS) from surveys and U.S. Navy aerial photographs from 1961 to 1966, and was named by the Advisory Committee on Antarctic Names after William J. Kosco. Kosco was a topographic engineer at the USGS from 1952 to 1983 and was chief of the Polar Programs Office from 1975 to 1983, with responsibility for Antarctic mapping.

== See also ==
- Mountains in Antarctica
