= Schmidt Glacier (Antarctica) =

Glacier in Antarctica

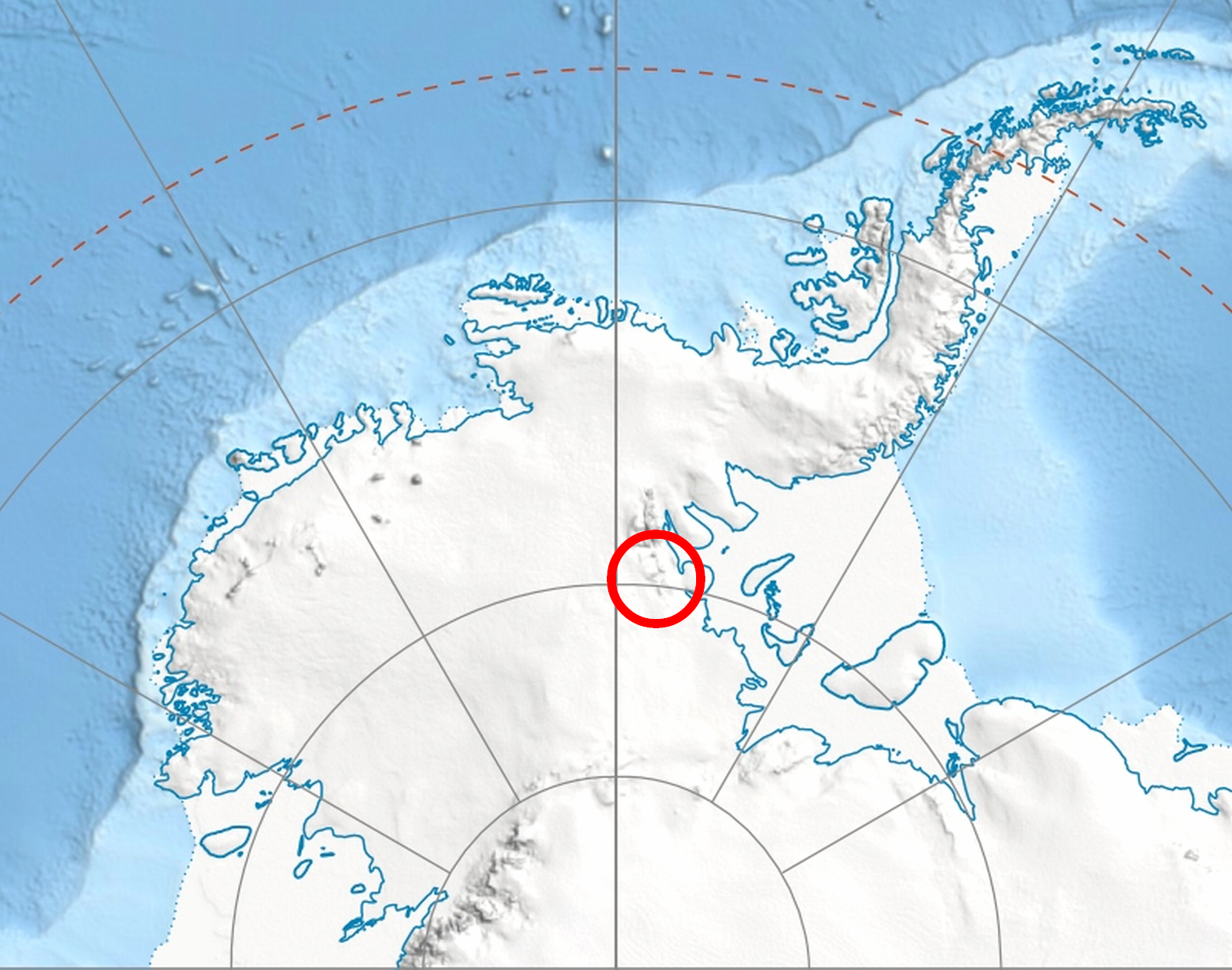
- Location of Heritage Range in Western Antarctica

- Location within Antarctica
- Type: tributary
- Location: Ellsworth Land
- Coordinates: 79°15′00″S 83°42′00″W
- Length: 20 nautical miles (37 km; 23 mi)
- Thickness: unknown
- Terminus: Splettstoesser Glacier
- Status: unknown

Schmidt Glacier (79°15′S 83°42′W) is a glacier, 20 nautical miles (37 km; 23 mi) long, in the Pioneer Heights of the Heritage Range, Ellsworth Mountains in Antarctica. The glacier originates near Hall Peak and drains north along the west side of Thompson Escarpment and Gross Hills to coalesce with the lower part of Splettstoesser Glacier, north of Mount Virginia. It was named by the University of Minnesota Ellsworth Mountains Party, 1961–62, for Paul G. Schmidt, geologist with the party.

== See also ==
- List of glaciers in the Antarctic
- Glaciology
