= Samuel Nunataks =

Samuel Nunataks (79°38′S 82°30′W) is a chain of about seven nunataks at the southeast end of the Nimbus Hills, in the Heritage Range in Antarctica.

The nunataks were mapped by United States Geological Survey (USGS) from surveys and U.S. Navy air photos 1961–1966. The chain was named by the Advisory Committee on Antarctic Names (US-ACAN) for Samuel L. Wilson, meteorological electronics technician at Little America V Station in 1957.

== Features ==
Geographical features include:

- Higgins Nunatak
