= Yochelson Ridge =

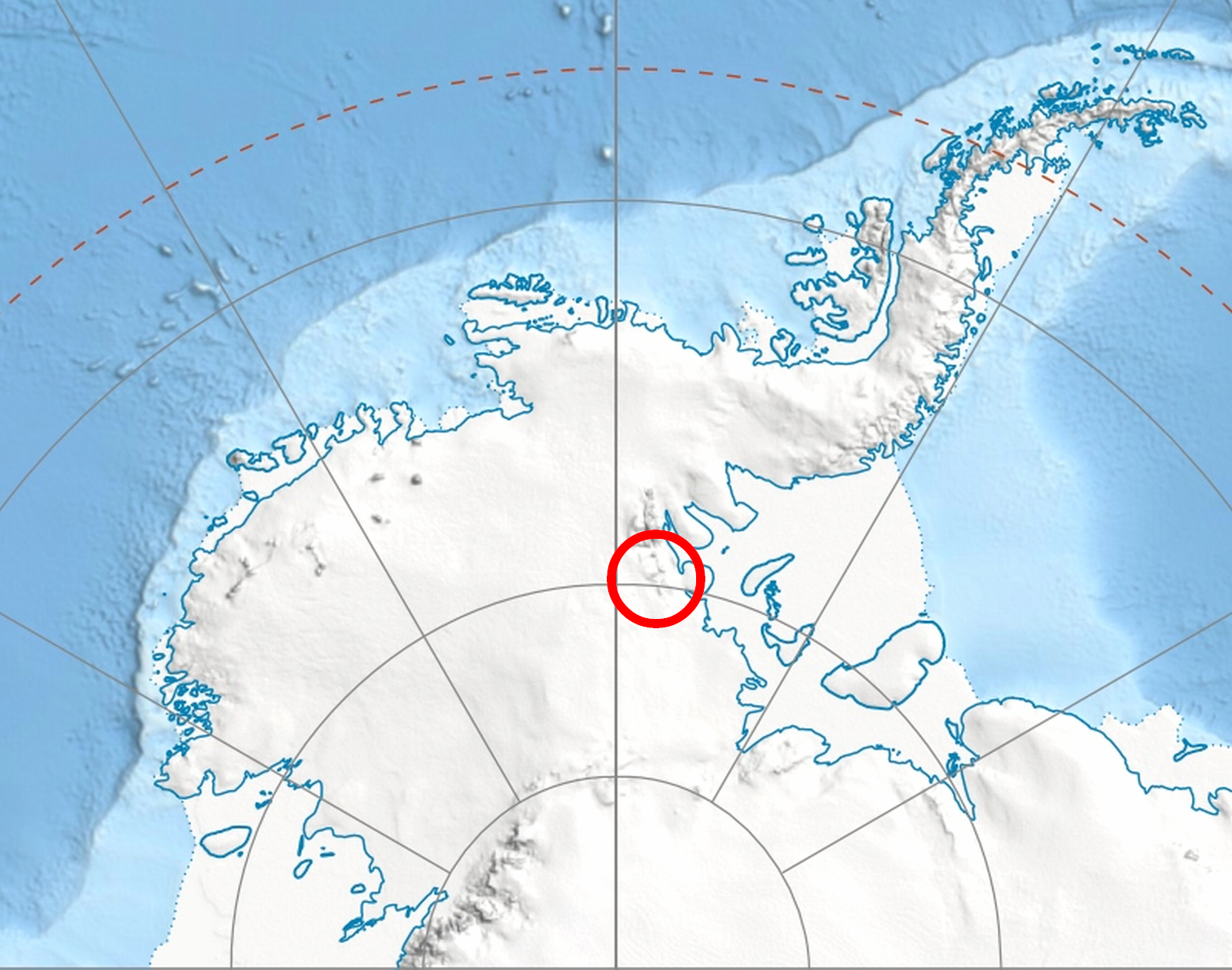
Location of Heritage Range in Western Antarctica.

Yochelson Ridge (79°36′S 84°25′W) is a rugged, partly snow-covered ridge, about 4 miles (6 km) long, extending north-northwest from Eley Peak, Soholt Peaks, in the Heritage Range, Ellsworth Mountains. It was mapped by United States Geological Survey (USGS) from surveys and U.S. Navy aerial photographs from 1961 to 1966. It was named by the Advisory Committee on Antarctic Names (US-ACAN) after Ellis L. Yochelson, a USGS geologist at the National Museum of Natural History in Washington, DC and a paleontologist with the United States Antarctic Research Program (USARP) Ellsworth Mountains Expedition of 1979–80.
