= Soholt Peaks =

Group of mountains in Antarctica

Soholt Peaks (79°43′S 84°12′W) are a group of rugged, ice-free peaks rising between Gifford Peaks and Drake Icefall in the Heritage Range of the Ellsworth Mountains in Antarctica. They were named by the University of Minnesota Ellsworth Mountains Party of 1962–63 for Donald E. Soholt, a geologist with that party. The Soholt Peaks were first traversed in December 2013 by Ralf Laier, Pachi Ibarra and Seth Timpano in Alpine style. The expedition was split into two phases due to adverse weather conditions and lasted in total eight days and six nights. It included the First Ascent of First Soholt Peak 2328m, Eley Peak (2311m), Lillywhite Peak (2321m), Fourth Peak (22610m), Rooster Comb Ridge (2250m), Cerro Catedral (2412m), Mount Macalester (2480m) and also the First Descent via the Phylon Ice Fall.

== Features ==
Geographical features include:

- Balish Glacier
- Conglomerate Ridge
- Eley Peak
- Mount Bursik
- Mount Macalester
- Schanz Glacier
- Yochelson Ridge
