= Donald Ridge =

Donald Ridge (79°37′S 83°10′W) is a narrow ridge extending south from Mount Capley in the Pioneer Heights, Heritage Range. It was mapped by the United States Geological Survey from surveys and U.S. Navy air photos, 1961–66, and was named by the Advisory Committee on Antarctic Names for Donald L. Willson, a meteorologist at Little America V Station in 1958.
