= Elvers Peak =

Mountain in Antarctica

Elvers Peak (79°52′S 83°33′W) is a peak, 1,615 metres (5,300 ft) high, at the southeast end of the Edson Hills in the Heritage Range, Antarctica. It was mapped by the United States Geological Survey from surveys and U.S. Navy air photos, 1961–66, and was named by the Advisory Committee on Antarctic Names for Douglas J. Elvers, a seismologist on the United States Antarctic Research Program South Pole—Queen Maud Land Traverse II, in 1965–66.

== See also ==
- Mountains in Antarctica
