= Schneider Glacier =

Glacier in Antarctica

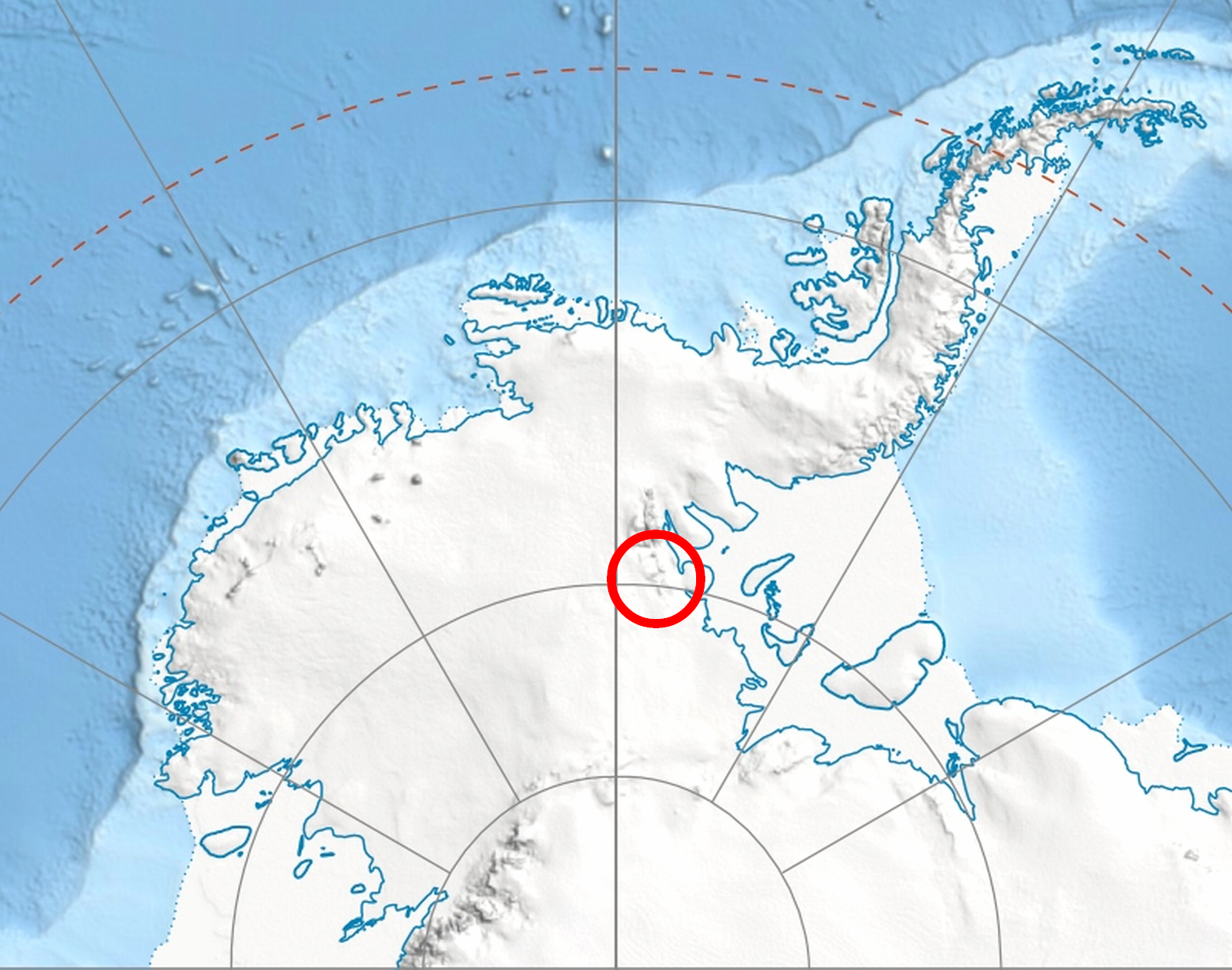
- Location of Heritage Range in Western Antarctica

- Location within Antarctica
- Type: tributary
- Location: Ellsworth Land
- Coordinates: 79°29′00″S 84°17′00″W
- Length: 15 nautical miles (28 km; 17 mi)
- Thickness: unknown
- Terminus: Balish Glacier
- Status: unknown

Schneider Glacier (79°29′S 84°17′W) is a glacier in the Heritage Range in Antarctica. It is 15 nautical miles (28 km; 17 mi) long, draining north between the Dunbar and Inferno Ridge and coalescing with Balish Glacier before entering the Splettstoesser Glacier. It was mapped by United States Geological Survey (USGS) from surveys and U.S. Navy air photos, 1961–66.

It was named by Advisory Committee on Antarctic Names (US-ACAN) for Commander Arthur F. Schneider, maintenance officer of U.S. Navy Squadron VX-6 during Deep Freeze 1965, and commanding officer in 1968.

== See also ==
- List of glaciers in the Antarctic
- Glaciology
