= Atwater Hill =

Atwater Hill (66°11′S 66°38′W) is a hill in Antarctica, 2.5 miles (4 km) south of Benedict Point on the east side of Lavoisier Island, Biscoe Islands. It was mapped from air photos by the Falkland Islands and Dependencies Aerial Survey Expedition (1956–57), and named by the UK Antarctic Place-Names Committee for Wilbur Olin Atwater, an American physiologist who, with Francis Gano Benedict, perfected the technique for calorimetric measurement of metabolism.
