= Marmon-Herrington =

American manufacturer of axles and transfer cases for vehicles

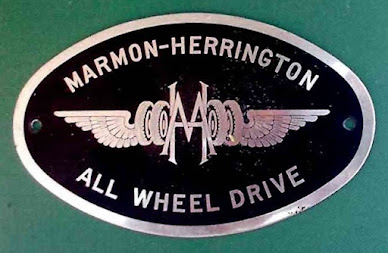
- Type: Subsidiary
- Founded: 1931; 95 years ago in Indianapolis, Indiana, United States
- Founder: Walter C. Marmon; Arthur W. Herrington
- Headquarters: Louisville, Kentucky, United States
- Products: Axles, transfer cases, military vehicles, tanks, trucks and trolley buses
- Parent: Berkshire Hathaway
- Website: marmon-herrington.com

The Marmon-Herrington Company, Inc., is an American manufacturer of axles and transfer cases for trucks and other vehicles. Earlier, the company built military vehicles and some tanks during World War II, and until the late 1950s or early 1960s was a manufacturer of trucks and trolley buses. Marmon-Herrington had a partnership with Ford Motor Company, producing trucks and other commercial vehicles, such as buses. The company may be best known for its all-wheel-drive conversions to other truck maker's units, especially to Ford truck models. Founded in 1931, Marmon-Herrington was based in Indianapolis, Indiana, with a plant in Windsor, Ontario, and remained in Indianapolis until 1963. It is now based in Louisville, Kentucky.

== History ==
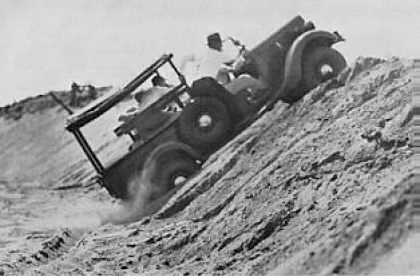
Marmon–Herrington all-wheel-drive converted Ford 1/2-ton truck. Delivered in small numbers to the U.S. and Belgian Armies, and some other countries, circa 1936

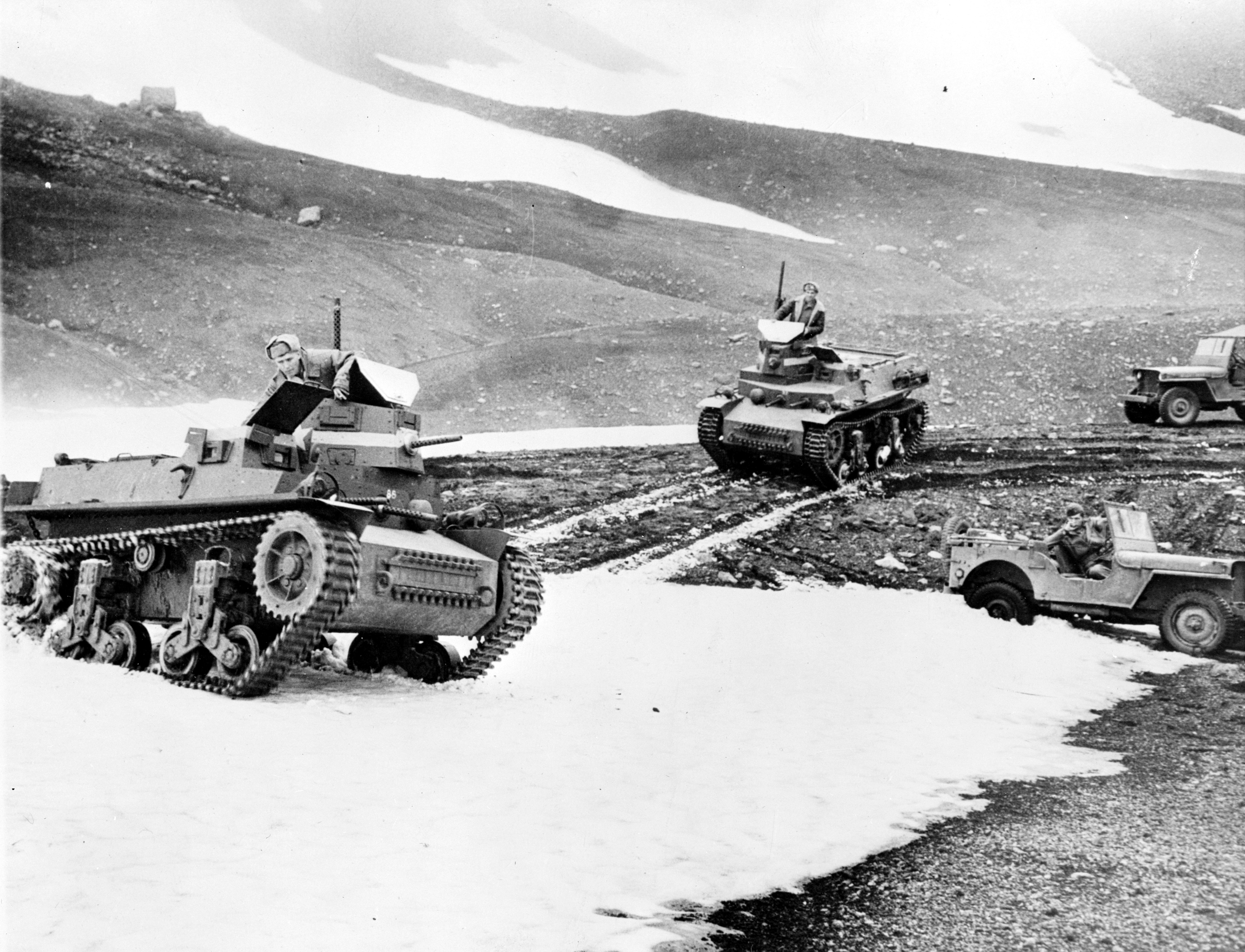
Two Marmon–Herrington CTLS (combat tank light series) U.S. tanks maneuvering in a mountain pass in Alaska in 1942

Marmon-Herrington was founded in 1931 by Walter C. Marmon and Arthur W. Herrington as a successor to the Marmon Motor Car Company, a maker of high-quality, costly automobiles from 1902 to 1933. By the early 1930s, the U.S. economy had taken a severe downturn, and with the onset of the Great Depression, the market for prestigious luxury cars mostly collapsed. To keep his business going, Marmon joined forces with an ex-military engineer in the person of Arthur Herrington in 1931, with a new idea to focus on building all-wheel-drive trucks. And so the company became Marmon-Herrington, initially as the truck production division of the Marmon Motor Car Company, developing military trucks.

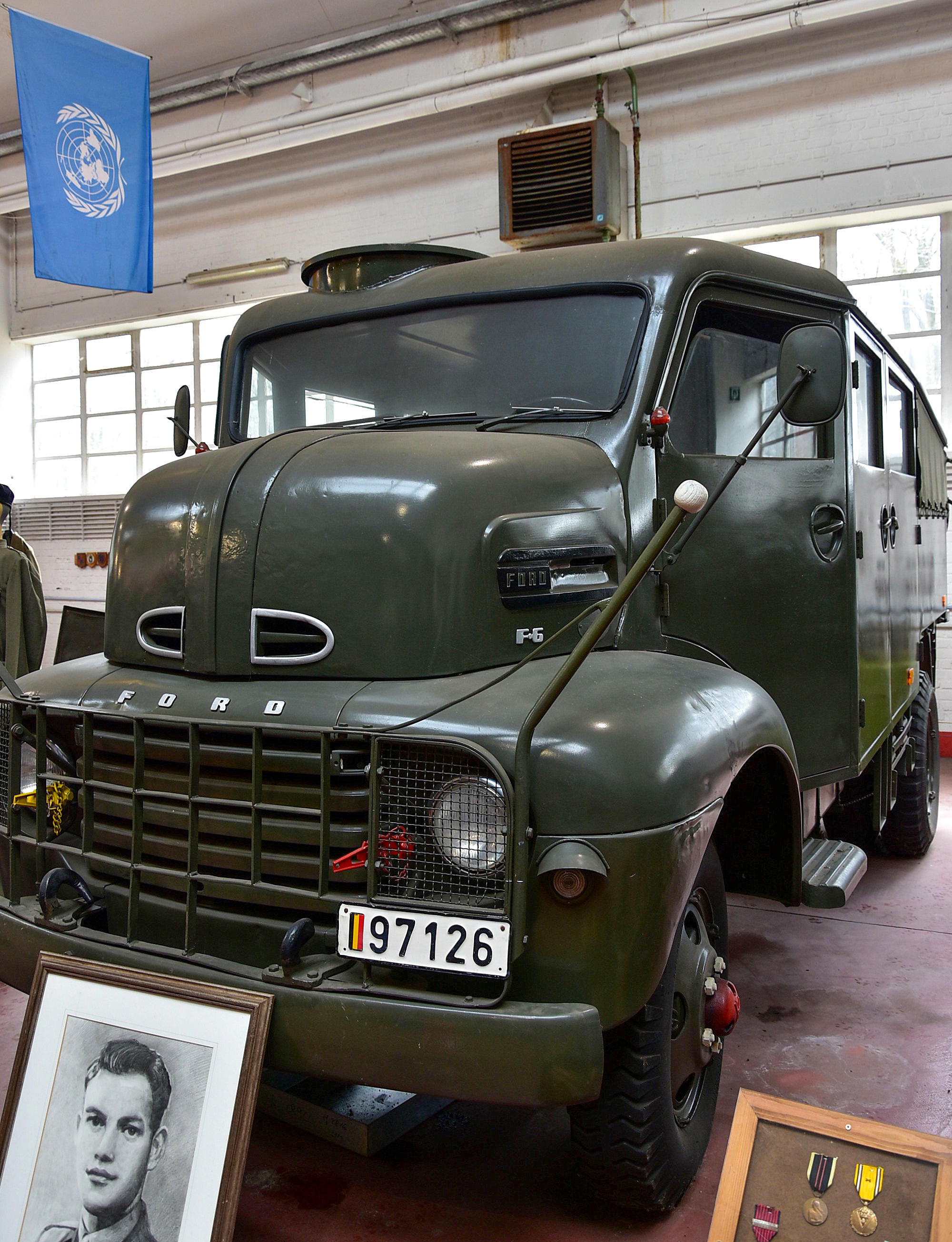
Ford F-6 Marmon-Herrington, produced in a factory in Antwerp

Marmon-Herrington got off to a successful start in March 1931, when the company procured contracts for 33 T-1 4x4 aircraft refueling trucks, powered by 6-cylinder Hercules engines, followed by a variety of 4x4 and 6x6 vehicles for the U.S. and Persian armies, for use as general load carriers, towing light weaponry, mobile machine shops, and wreckers. Reconnaissance, scout and armored cars were also made, some with four-wheel steering as well as four-wheel drive. In 1932 Marmon-Herrington built the first all-wheel-drive truck and trailer combination, and the largest trucks ever built at the time, for oil pipe construction in Iraq. Construction of all-wheel-drive (AWD) vehicles and conversion of existing vehicles to AWD were among the company's products. Marmon-Herrington's all-wheel-drive conversions of Ford light trucks were successfully sold to the military of both the U.S. and several foreign governments.

In 1936, the T9 Ford–Marmon-Herrington unarmored half-track was produced for the U.S. Army and featured the tracks, the powered front axle and a front ditch roller that would be used on the armored half-tracks of World War II.

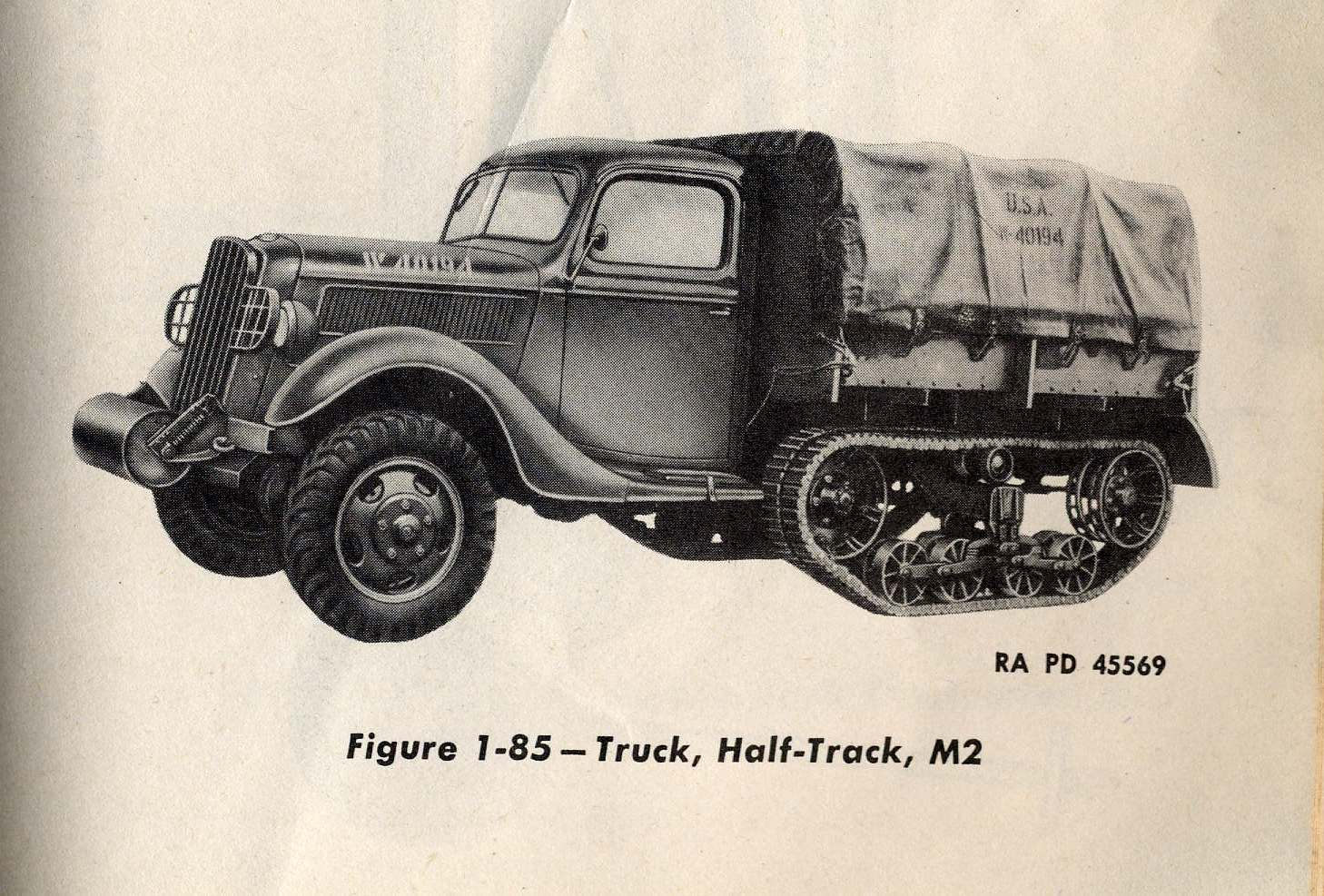
Ford–Marmon-Herrington half-track

Marmon-Herrington also made multi-stop delivery vans and passenger vehicles. The company designed a military armored vehicle which could be constructed on a commercial truck chassis. The design was taken up by South Africa in 1938, the result of which became known as the Marmon-Herrington armoured car, which was used by British and Commonwealth armies in the North Africa Campaign.

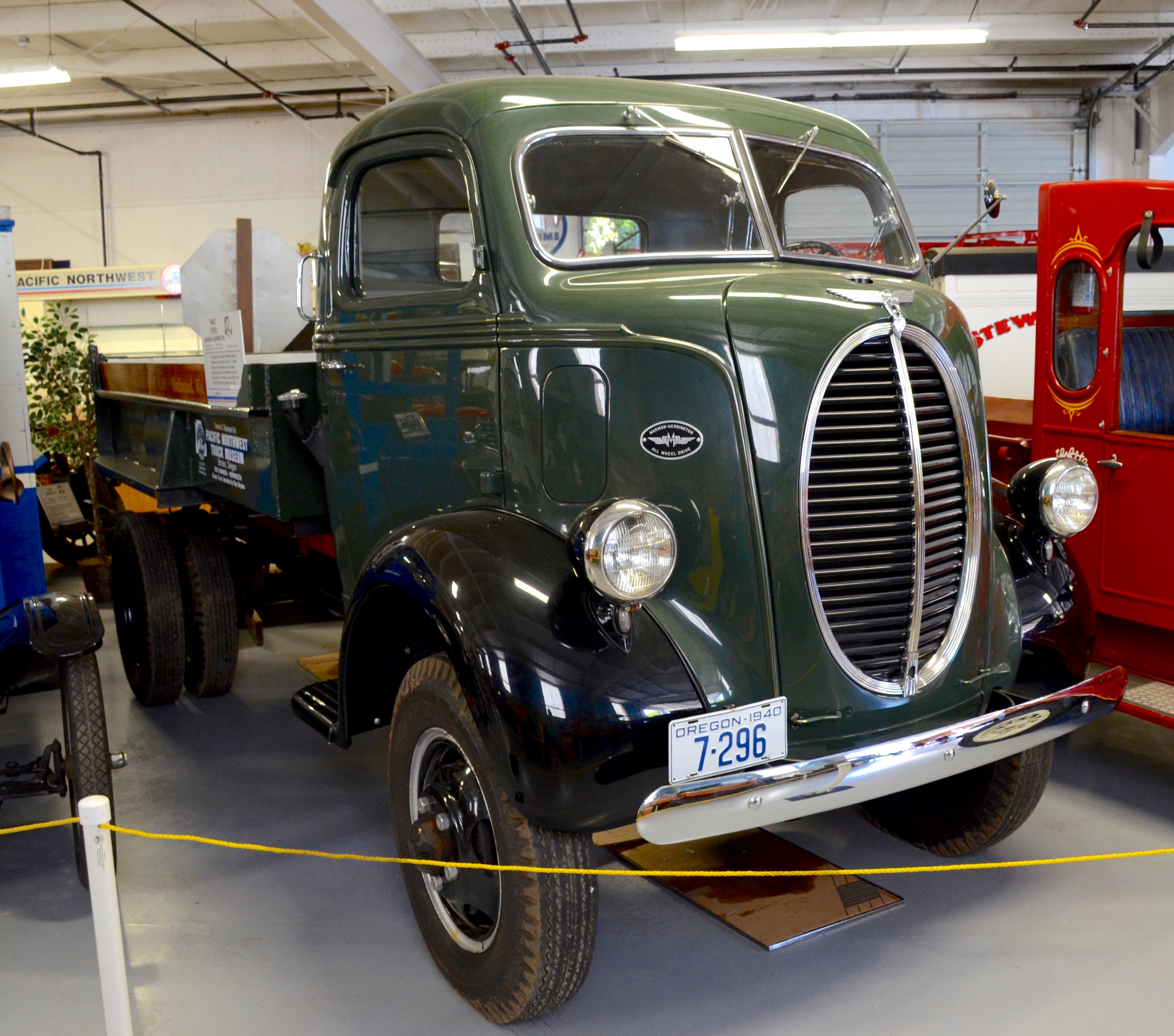
A 1940 Ford/Marmon-Herrington dump truck preserved at the Pacific Northwest Truck Museum, in Oregon

During World War II the British were looking for a purpose-built airborne light tank to replace the Tetrarch light tank but decided not to produce the tank in Britain due to a lack of production capacity. Instead, the American government was approached with a request that it produce a replacement for the Tetrarch. This request was made by the British Air Commission in Washington, D.C., with a proposal calling for a tank of between 9 t (8.9 long tons) and 10 t (9.8 long tons) to be developed, this being the maximum weight the War Office had decided could be carried by current glider technology. The United States Ordnance Department was given the task of developing the proposed tank, and in turn, requested designs from three American companies: General Motors, J. Walter Christie and Marmon-Herrington. The design offered by Christie in mid-1941 was rejected as it failed to meet the specified size requirements, as was a modified design the company produced in November. At a conference in May 1941, the Ordnance Department chose the Marmon-Herrington design and requested that the company produce a prototype tank, which was completed in late 1941; it was designated the Light Tank T9 (Airborne) by the company and the Ordnance Department and later designated M22.

The company also manufactured airport fire trucks, like the Marmon-Herrington MB-1 and Marmon-Herrington MB-5. They were mainly used by the military, like the U.S Army Air Force and U.S. Navy. Post-War civilian adaptations, known as "Brush Breakers", were also produced.

== Trolley buses ==
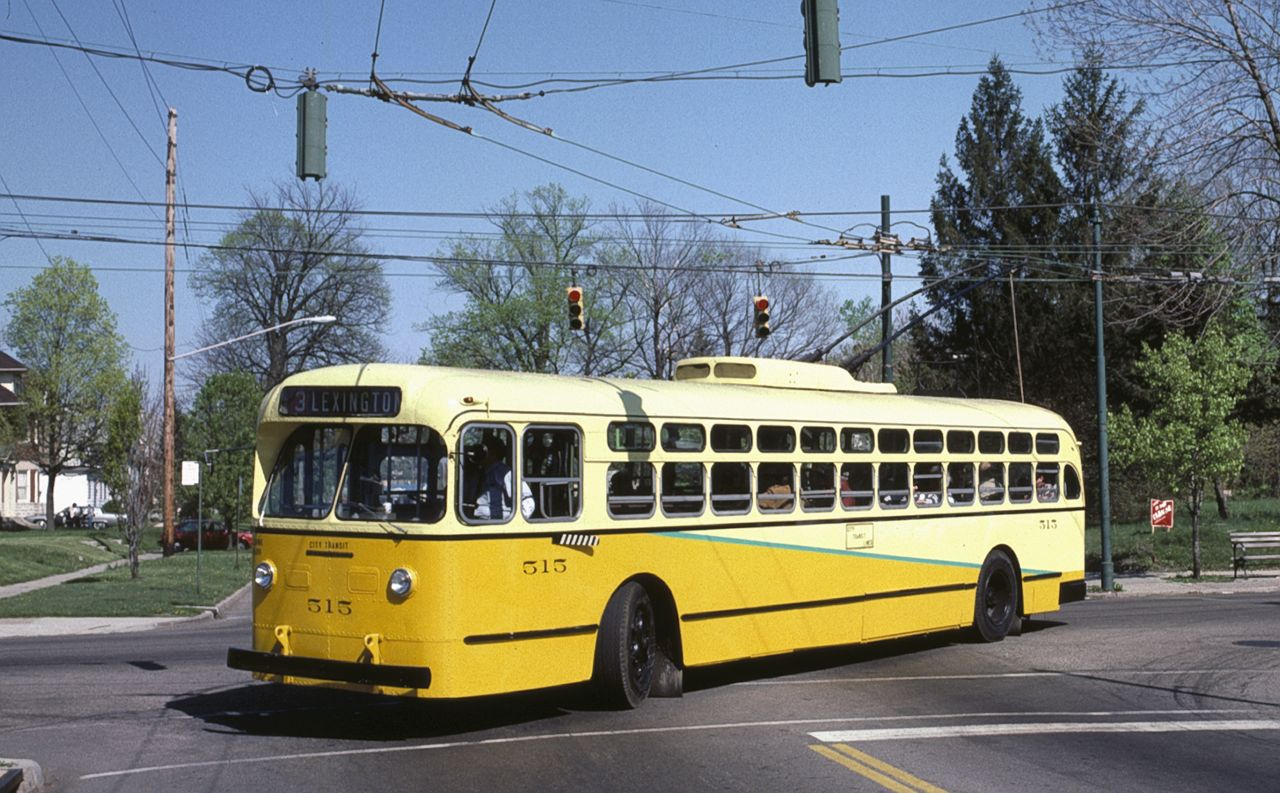
A 1949 Marmon-Herrington TC48 trolley bus on the Dayton, Ohio trolleybus system.

The company's foray into transit buses began in 1946, when it produced its first electric trolley bus. The end of World War II had brought a steep drop in the need for military vehicles, so Marmon-Herrington looked for another area of vehicle manufacturing in which it might find new business. Its first "trolley coaches", the more common term for trolley buses at that time, introduced innovative features such as lightweight monocoque bodies and strong, double-girder sidewalls, which made the Marmon–Herrington trolley coach the best-selling trolley coach of the postwar era. Its trolley buses were successful in the fleets of many North American cities, most notably Chicago and San Francisco, which purchased large numbers; Chicago bought 349 in a single order (delivered in 1951–52), a record for Marmon-Herrington. Marmon-Herrington supplied trolley buses to 16 different cities in the United States, among the buyers being the Cincinnati Street Railway Company, which purchased 214, and the Cleveland Railway, with 125; vehicles were also sold to two cities in Brazil. The principal models were the TC44, TC48, and TC49, with the number denoting the number of seats. A single order of the 40-seat TC40 model was produced for San Francisco, and likewise, the TC46 was produced for only one customer, Philadelphia, before Marmon-Herrington replaced it with the TC48 model.

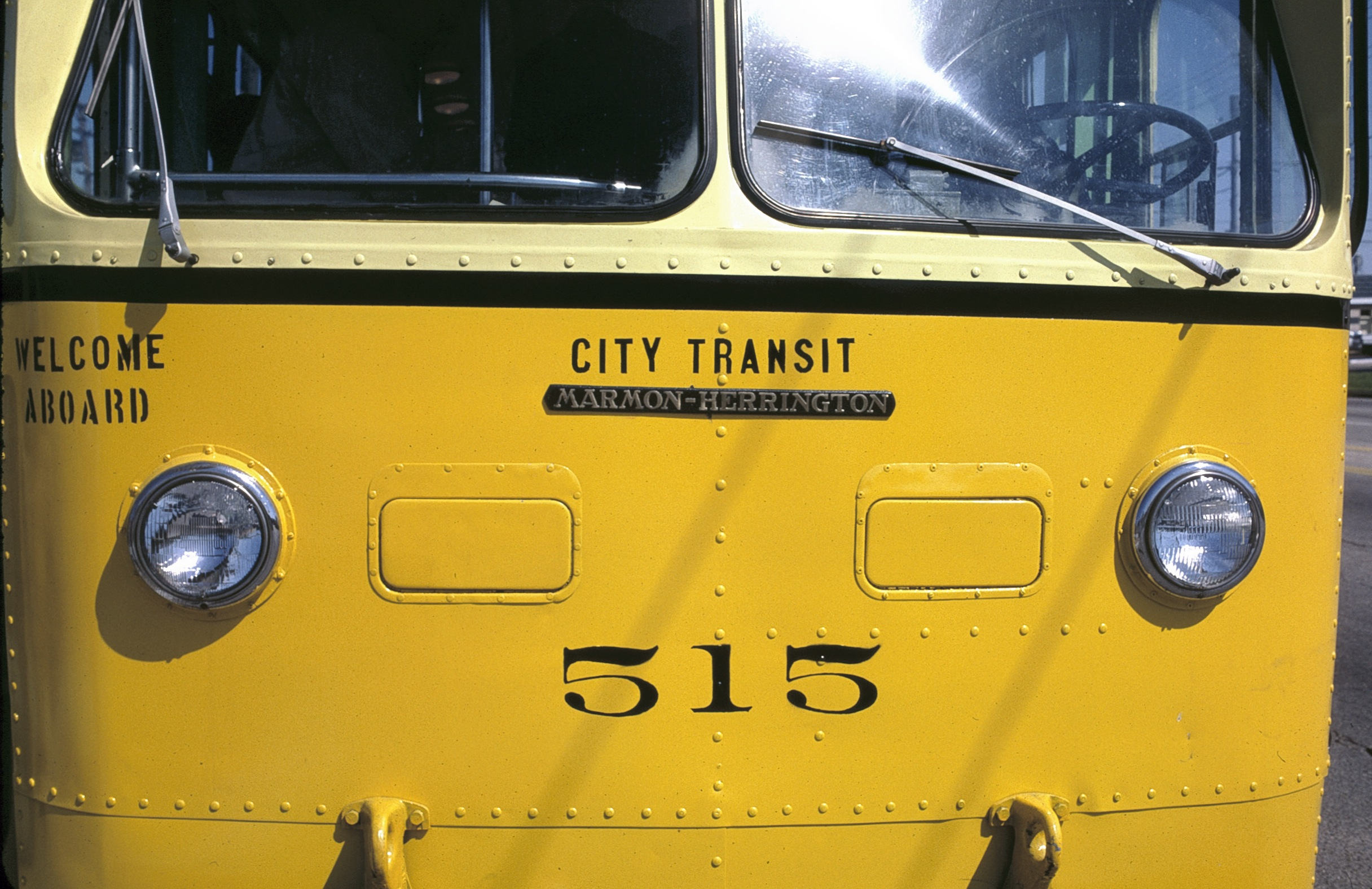
Marmon–Herrington nameplate on a Dayton trolley bus (below "City Transit").

Trolley bus production lasted from 1946 until 1959; in total, 1,624 vehicles were produced, all at the company's Indianapolis factory. The last of San Francisco's 260 Marmon-Herrington trolley buses were retired in 1976 and Philadelphia's last units in 1981. Some Marmon-Herrington trolley buses withdrawn from service in the United States were sold secondhand to Mexico City's Servicio de Transportes Eléctricos (STE) between the late 1960s and late 1970s and continued in service for many more years on that city's trolley bus network. Although the last Marmon-Herrington trolley buses in original form were retired by STE in 1988, many underwent a rebuilding of their bodies in the 1980s by the Mexican company Moyada and continued working; the last five of these Moyada-remodeled Marmon-Herrington trolley buses of STE survived in service until 2002. By the late 1950s, the market for new trolley buses in North America had dried up, as some trolley bus systems were being abandoned while others had re-equipped with new Marmon-Herrington vehicles. The company's last orders for transit vehicles were also its only export orders for trolley buses, to Recife and Belo Horizonte in Brazil, comprising 65 and 50 TC49s, respectively, delivered in 1958–59. Recife overhauled some of its TC49s in the 1980s, and several remained in service until 2001.

The Illinois Railway Museum has preserved two ex-Chicago Transit Authority Marmon-Herrington trolley coaches and one ex-Milwaukee unit.

== 1960s to present ==
In the early 1960s, the Pritzker family bought the company, and soon the focus on full vehicle manufacturing ended, the truck designs being sold to a new company, Marmon Motor Company that traded under the Marmon brand. Marmon-Herrington's longtime main plant and headquarters in Indianapolis was closed in 1963. The remaining production became part of an association of companies which in 1964 adopted the name Marmon Group. During the Cold war era, Marmon diversified its production line by adding aircraft, missiles and rockets ground support equipment, manufactured by its subsidiary, Cardair, based in Chicago, Illinois.

The Marmon-Harrington Company continues today as a converter of commercial trucks to all-wheel-drive (AWD) vehicles, as well as a manufacturer of transmissions, transfer cases, and axles for heavy vehicles. Marmon-Herrington axles can still be found on even the newest military vehicles and commercial trucks. In addition to building installation kits for all-wheel-drive, the company has also become a front-drive-axle and transfer case manufacturer to the medium- and heavy-duty truck market.

In 2008, the holding company Berkshire Hathaway purchased a majority stake in Marmon Holdings, which includes the Marmon Group and Marmon-Herrington.
