= Warren Nunatak =

Warren Nunatak (79°32′S 82°50′W) is a nunatak located four nautical miles (7 km; 5 mi) east of Mount Capley, along the east side of the Nimbus Hills in the Heritage Range. Mapped by United States Geological Survey (USGS) from surveys and U.S. Navy air photos, 1961–66. Named by Advisory Committee on Antarctic Names (US-ACAN) for Arthur D. Warren, auroral scientist at Ellsworth Station in 1958.
