= Gross Hills =

The Gross Hills (79°18′S 83°22′W) are the line of rugged hills and peaks located east of Schmidt Glacier, in the Heritage Range of Antarctica. They were named by the University of Minnesota Geological Party, 1963–64, for Barton Gross, a geologist with the party.

== Features ==
Geographical features include:

- Courtney Peak
- Flanagan Glacier
- Rosen Peak
- Schmidt Glacier
- Ziegler Point
