= Nimbus Hills =

Nimbus Hills (79°35′S 82°50′W) is a rugged line of hills and peaks about 14 nautical miles (26 km) long, forming the southeast part of Pioneer Heights in the Heritage Range, Ellsworth Mountains. Mapped by United States Geological Survey (USGS) from ground surveys and U.S. Navy air photos, 1961–66. Named by Advisory Committee on Antarctic Names (US-ACAN) after the National Aeronautics and Space Administration weather satellite, Nimbus, which took photographs of Antarctica (including the Ellsworth Mountains) from approximately 500 nautical miles (900 km) above earth on September 13, 1964.

== See also ==
Geographical features include:

=== Samuel Nunataks ===
- Higgins Nunatak

=== Other features ===
- Flanagan Glacier
- Mount Capley
- Warren Nunatak
