= Herington =

Herington is a surname. Notable people with the surname include:

- John Herington (1916–1967) British-born Australian military historian
- Jon Herington (born 1954), American musician
- Leigh Herington, American politician
- Marieve Herington, Canadian actress and singer

Fictional characters:

- Tjokkie Herington, character in the South African films Heel Against the Head and Running Riot

== See also ==
- Herrington (surname)
- Herrington (disambiguation)
