= Herrington (surname) =

Herrington is an English surname. Notable people with the surname include:

- Arthur William Sidney Herrington (1891–1970), English-American engineer
- Billy Herrington (1969–2018), American actor
- Daniel Herrington (born 1986), American racing driver
- Danielle Herrington (born 1993), American model
- Danny Herrington (c.1960–2005), British rugby player
- David Herrington, English cinematographer
- James Herrington (1824–1890), American politician
- John Herrington (born 1958), American astronaut
- John S. Herrington (born 1939), American politician
- Maycie Herrington (1918–2016), American history conservator
- Rowdy Herrington (born 1951), American film director and screenwriter
- Stuart A. Herrington, American counterintelligence officer and writer
- Terrance Herrington (born 1966), American runner

== See also ==
- Herington, a surname
