= Johnson Neck =

Coordinates: 79°27′S 82°20′W

Johnson Neck is a relatively low, ice-drowned neck of land, or isthmus, which joins the Dott Ice Rise to the east side of the Pioneer Heights in the Heritage Range of the Ellsworth Mountains, Antarctica. It was mapped by the United States Geological Survey from surveys and U.S. Navy air photos, 1961–66, and was named by the Advisory Committee on Antarctic Names for Douglas J. Johnson, a meteorologist at Byrd Station in 1965.
