= Herrington Hill =

Hill in Antarctica

Herrington Hill (66°15′S 66°42′W) is a hill on the east side of Lavoisier Island, in the Biscoe Islands of Antarctica, about 5 nautical miles (9 km) southward of Benedict Point. It was mapped from air photos taken by the Falkland Islands and Dependencies Aerial Survey Expedition (1956–57), and was named by the UK Antarctic Place-Names Committee for Lovic P. Herrington, an American physiologist who has specialized in the reactions of the human body to cold environments.
