= Lester Peak =

Glacier Peak

Lester Peak (79°49′S 83°42′W) is a prominent snow-free peak at the south side of Hyde Glacier 1 nautical mile (2 km) northeast of Buggisch Peak in the Edson Hills of the Heritage Range, Marie Byrd Land, Antarctica. It was mapped by the United States Geological Survey from surveys and U.S. Navy air photos from 1961 to 1966, and was named by the Advisory Committee on Antarctic Names for Lester A. Johnson, a meteorologist at Little America V Station in 1958.

== See also ==
- Mountains in Antarctica
