= Eley Peak =

Mountain in Antarctica

Eley Peak (79°39′S 84°20′W) is a small rock peak (2311m) in the northern part of the Soholt Peaks, overlooking the head of Balish Glacier in the Heritage Range of the Ellsworth Mountains. It was mapped by the United States Geological Survey from surveys and U.S. Navy air photos, 1961–66, and was named by the Advisory Committee on Antarctic Names for Richard G. Eley, a U.S. Navy photographer on flights over Marie Byrd Land and Ellsworth Land, 1965–66 and 1966–67. It was first climbed on 20 December 2013, by Ralf Laier, Pachi Ibarra and Seth Timpano in Alpine style during their traverse of the Soholt Peaks.

== See also ==
- Mountains in Antarctica
