= Drake Icefall =

Coordinates: 79°46′S 83°50′W

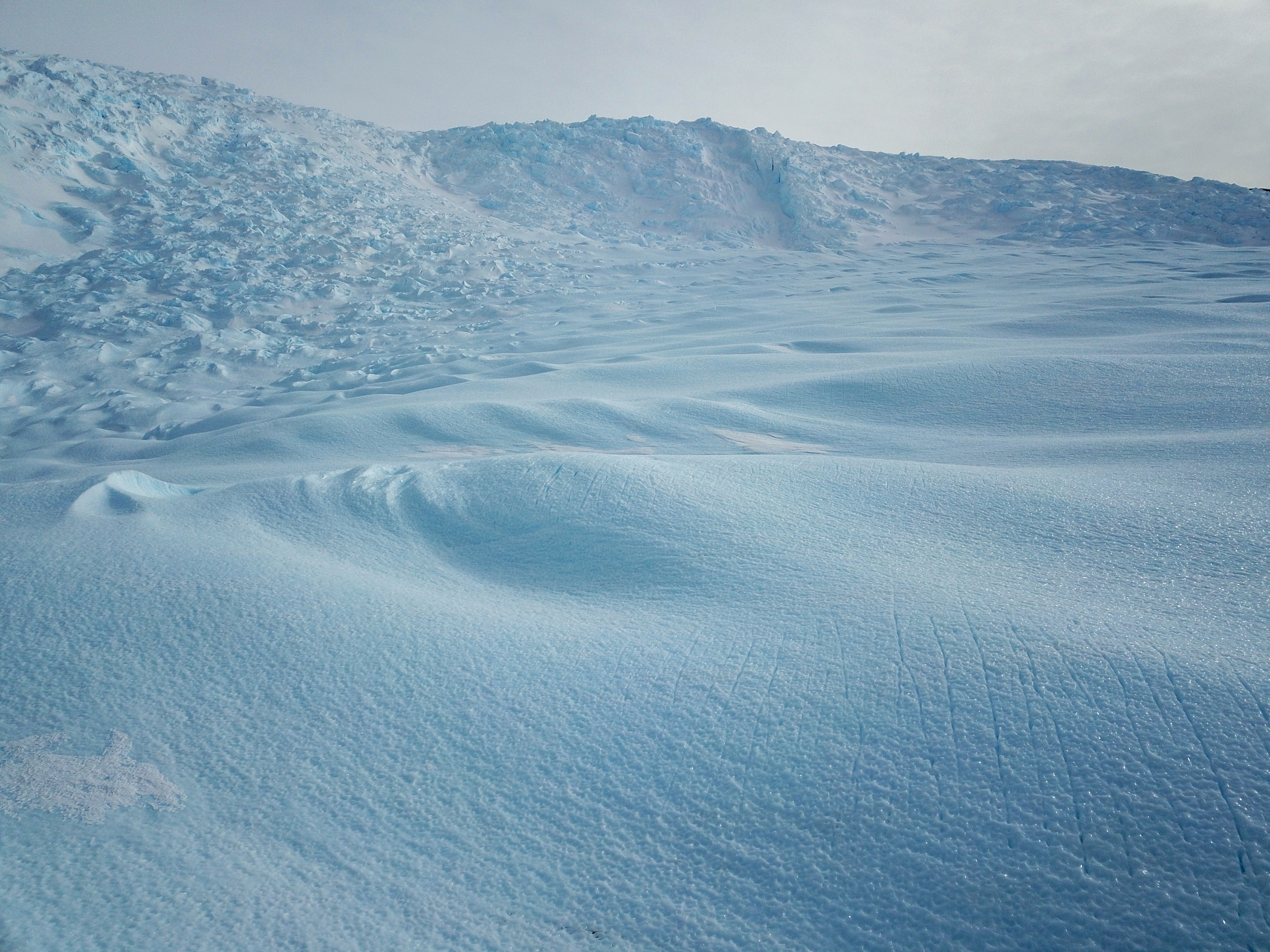
Drake Icefall, January 2018

Drake Icefall is an icefall 2 nautical miles (4 km) wide between the Soholt Peaks and the Edson Hills in Antarctica, draining eastward from the plateau to join the general flow of Union Glacier through the Heritage Range, Ellsworth Mountains. It was named by the University of Minnesota Ellsworth Mountains Party, 1962–63, for Benjamin Drake IV, a geologist and member of the party.
