= Hall Peak =

Mountain in Antarctica

Hall Peak (79°29′S 83°45′W) is a peak, 2,170 metres (7,120 ft) high, in the Heritage Range of Antarctica, surmounting the dividing ridge at the upper reaches of Rennell Glacier, Schmidt Glacier and Larson Valley. It was named by the University of Minnesota Geological Party to these mountains in 1963–64 for Walter D. M. (Mike) Hall, a geologist with the party.

== See also ==
- Mountains in Antarctica
