= Mount Macalester =

Mountain in Antarctica

Mount Macalester (79°41′S 84°20′W) is a prominent peak rising to 2,480 metres (8,140 ft) in the central part of the Soholt Peaks, Heritage Range, Ellsworth Mountains, Antarctica. It was mapped by the United States Geological Survey from surveys and U.S. Navy aerial photographs from 1961 to 1966. The peak was named by the Advisory Committee on Antarctic Names after Macalester College, the alma mater of Gerald F. Webers, the leader of the United States Antarctic Research Program Ellsworth Mountains Expedition of 1979–80. It was first climbed on 28 December 2013, by Ralf Laier, Pachi Ibarra and Seth Timpano in Alpine style during their traverse of the Soholt Peaks.

== See also ==
- Mountains in Antarctica
