= Ziegler Point =

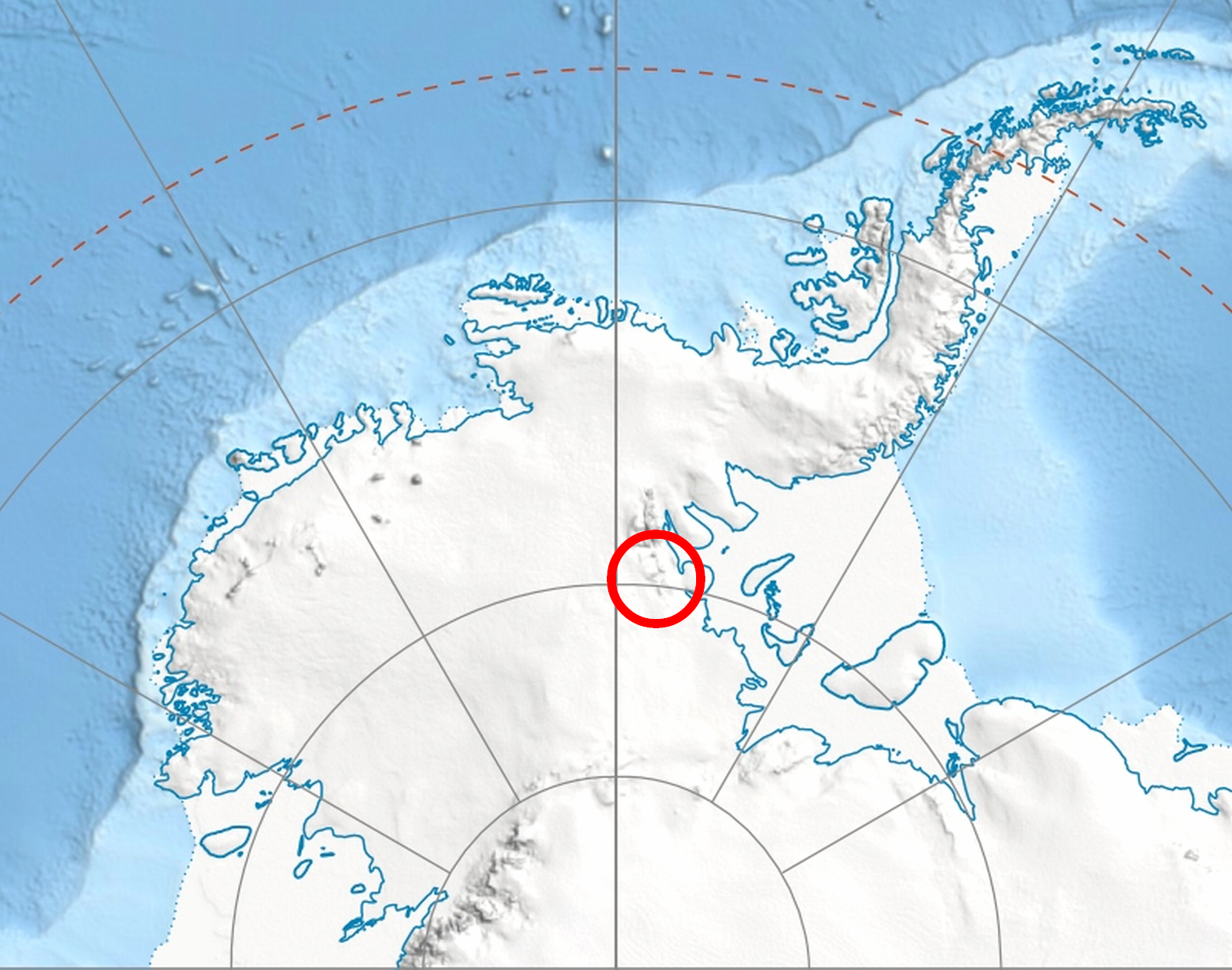
Location of Heritage Range in Western Antarctica.

Ziegler Point (79°21′S 83°0′W) is a high rock point, or spur, on the southeast side of Gross Hills in the Heritage Range. Mapped by United States Geological Survey (USGS) from surveys and U.S. Navy air photos, 1961–66. Named by Advisory Committee on Antarctic Names (US-ACAN) for equipment operator Ernest L. Ziegler, U.S. Navy, a participant in Operation Deep Freeze 1966 at McMurdo Station.
