= Inferno Ridge =

Narrow Antarctic ridge

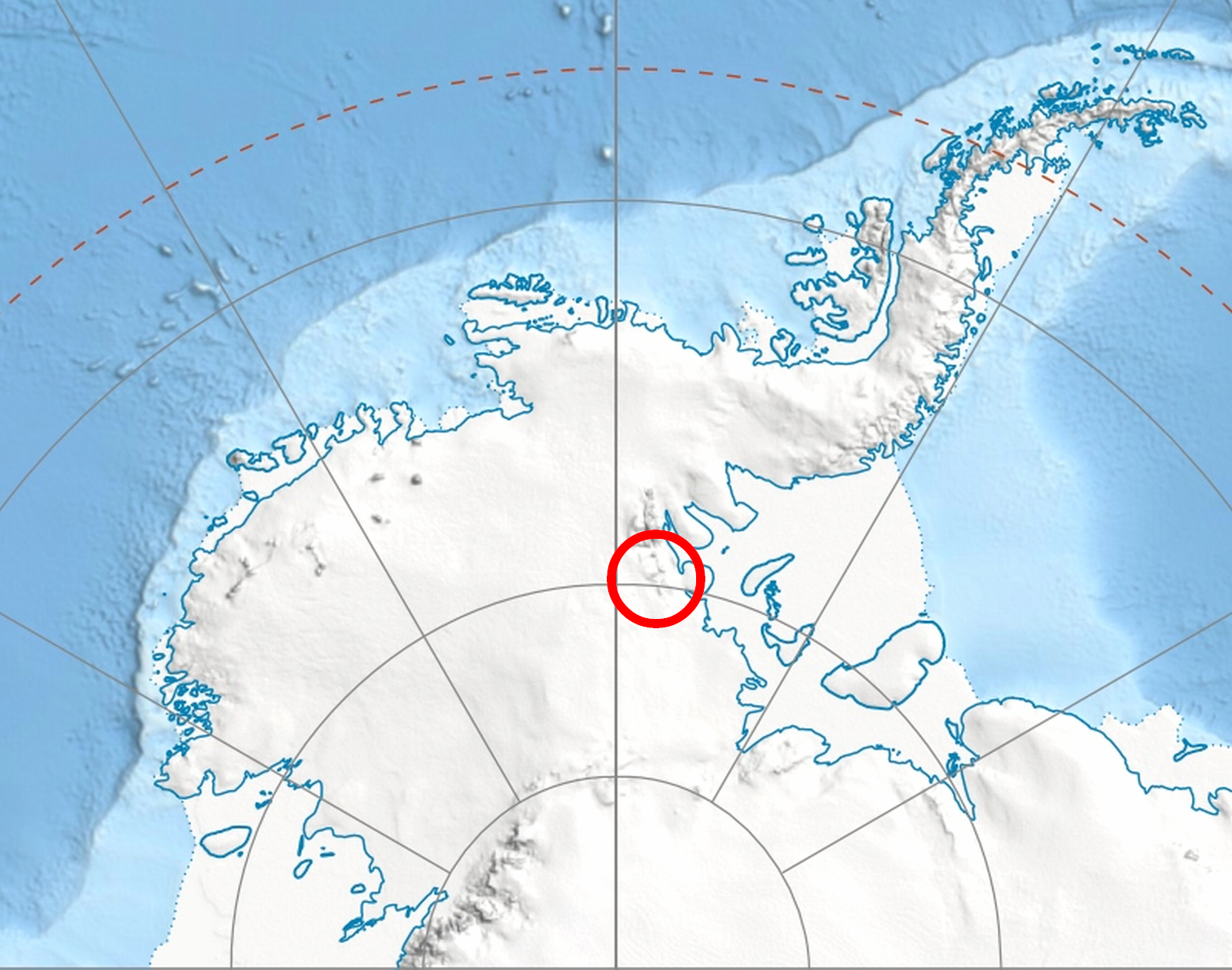
Location of Heritage Range in Western Antarctica.

Inferno Ridge (79°26′S 84°13′W) is a narrow ridge, 8 miles (13 km) long, rising between Schneider Glacier and Rennell Glacier in the Heritage Range, Antarctica. It was so named by the University of Minnesota "Geological Party" to these mountains, 1963–64, because the area is deeply dissected and composed of black rocks.

== Features ==
Geographical features include:

- Larson Valley
- Orheim Point
- Rennell Glacier
- Schneider Glacier
