= Edson Hills =

The Edson Hills (79°50′S 83°39′W) are a group of mainly ice-free hills lying south of Drake Icefall and west of Union Glacier in the Heritage Range of the Ellsworth Mountains in Antarctica. They were named by the University of Minnesota Ellsworth Mountains Party, 1962–63, for Dean T. Edson, a United States Geological Survey topographic engineer with the party.

== Features ==
Geographical features include:

- Buggisch Peak
- Drake Icefall
- Elvers Peak
- Hyde Glacier
- Kosco Peak
- Lester Peak
- Union Glacier
