= Benedict Point =

Benedict Point (66°9′S 66°36′W) is a headland about 5 nautical miles (9 km) south of Cape Leblond on the east side of Lavoisier Island, Biscoe Islands. It was mapped from air photos taken by the Falkland Islands and Dependencies Aerial Survey Expedition (1956–57), and named by the UK Antarctic Place-Names Committee for Francis G. Benedict, an American physiologist who, with W.O. Atwater, perfected the technique for calorimetric measurement of metabolism.
