= Arthur William Sidney Herrington =

American engineer and manufacturer

- Born: March 30, 1891; Coddenham, England
- Died: September 6, 1970 (aged 79); Indianapolis, Indiana, U.S.
- Resting place: Crown Hill Cemetery and Arboretum, Section Community Mausoleum, Lot 2K-D-14; 39.8274766°N 86.1730061°W

Arthur William Sidney "Art" Herrington (March 30, 1891 – September 6, 1970) was an American engineer and manufacturer. He designed the Jeep, military trucks, trolleys, and buses.

== Early life ==
Born in Coddenham, England, Herrington migrated to the US with his family at the age of five, settling in Madison, New Jersey. He attended Stevens Institute of Technology and took his first job with Harley Davidson.

== Military service ==
During World War I, Herrington was a lieutenant in the American Expeditionary Forces, serving as a motorcycle dispatch rider in Europe. During this time, he observed the difficulties of conventional vehicles when driving off road. He was discharged from regular service at the end of the war with the rank of captain. He was given a reserve commission, working as a consultant.

== Later career ==
Herrington left military service in 1925 after observing a truck built by a private company, Coleman Motors, outperformed army trucks. He subsequently joined Coleman Motors and worked there for six years, designing vehicles for military use, before founding the Marmon-Herrington company. Here, he built four and six wheel drive trucks which were later used in World War II. During this conflict, Herrington served as technical adviser to the American Mission to India and as director of the American Medical Center for Burma.

== Death ==
Herrington died in Indianapolis, Indiana, on September 6, 1970, after sustaining fatal head injuries in a car accident. He is interred at Crown Hill Cemetery in Indianapolis.
