= Buggisch Peak =

Mountain peak in Antarctica

Buggisch Peak (79°50′S 83°46′W) is a peak rising to 1,445 metres (4,740 ft), 1 nautical mile (2 km) southwest of Lester Peak, Edson Hills, in the Heritage Range, Ellsworth Mountains, Marie Byrd Land. It was mapped by the United States Geological Survey from surveys and from U.S. Navy aerial photographs, 1961–66, and named by the Advisory Committee on Antarctic Names after Werner Buggisch, a German member of the field party (stratigrapher, paleontologist) with the United States Antarctic Research Program Ellsworth Mountains Expedition, 1979–80, led by Gerald F. Webers.

== See also ==
- Mountains in Antarctica
