= Rosen Peak =

Mountain in Antarctica

Rosen Peak (79°19′S 83°21′W) is a peak rising to 1220 m in the south part of Gross Hills, Heritage Range, Ellsworth Mountains. It was named by the Advisory Committee on Antarctic Names (US-ACAN) (2004) after Lawrence C. Rosen, a geologist on the United States Antarctic Research Program (USARP) Ellsworth Mountains expedition of 1979–80.

== See also ==
- Mountains in Antarctica
