= Orheim Point =

Orheim Point (79°23′S 84°19′W) is a rock point at the end of Inferno Ridge in the Heritage Range, Ellsworth Mountains. Mapped by United States Geological Survey (USGS) from surveys and U.S. Navy air photos, 1961–66. Named by Advisory Committee on Antarctic Names (US-ACAN) for Olav Orheim, Norwegian glaciologist on the United States Antarctic Research Program (USARP) South Pole—Queen Maud Land Traverse II, 1965–66.
