= Cape Leblond =

Cape Leblond (66°4′S 66°36′W) is a cape forming the northern end of Lavoisier Island, in the Biscoe Islands of Antarctica. It was mapped by the French Antarctic Expedition, 1908–10, under Jean-Baptiste Charcot, and named by him for the President of the Norman Geographical Society at Rouen.
