= Mount Virginia =

Mountain in Ellsworth Land, Antarctica

Mount Virginia (79°15′S 84°2′W) is a bare rock mountain at the north extremity of a ridge in the Pioneer Heights, Heritage Range. The mountain marks the point of convergence of the Splettstoesser and Schmidt Glaciers. It was mapped by the United States Geological Survey (USGS) from ground surveys and U.S. Navy air photos from 1961 to 1966. It was named by the Advisory Committee on Antarctic Names (US-ACAN) for Virginia S. Taylor, a geographer and a staff assistant to US-ACAN from 1961 to 1965.
