= Austranten Rock =

Rock formation in Antarctica

Austranten Rock (71°24′S 14°2′E) is an isolated rock outcrop lying 2 miles (3 km) southeast of Todt Ridge, at the eastern extremity of the Gruber Mountains and the Wohlthat Mountains, in Queen Maud Land of Antarctica. It was discovered and plotted from air photos by the Third German Antarctic Expedition, 1938–39, re-plotted from air photos and surveys by the Sixth Norwegian Antarctic Expedition, 1956–60, and named "Austranten" (the "east ridge").
