= Hyde Glacier =

Glacier in Antarctica

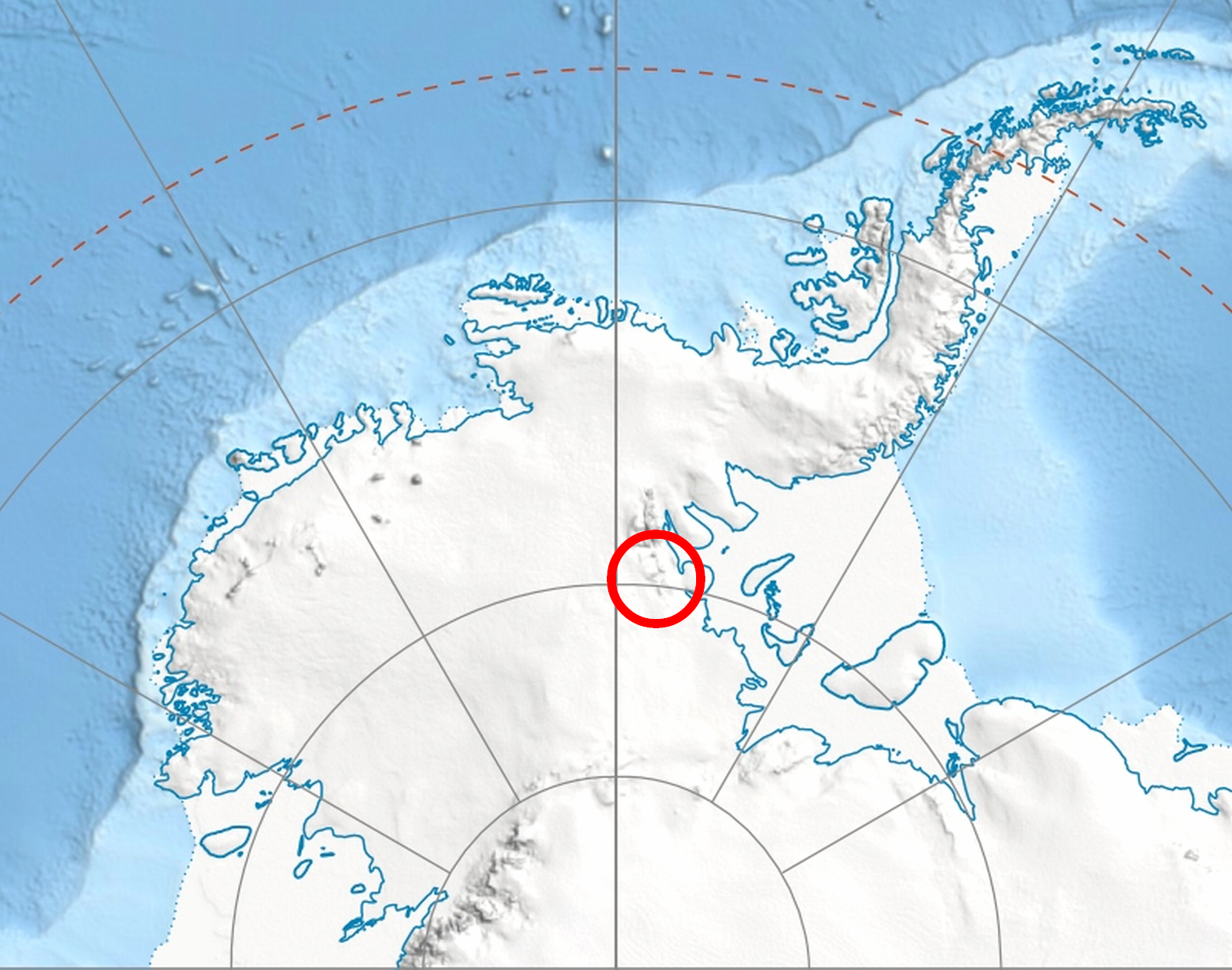
- Location of Heritage Range in Western Antarctica

- Location within Antarctica
- Type: tributary
- Location: Ellsworth Land
- Coordinates: 79°48′00″S 83°42′00″W
- Thickness: unknown
- Terminus: Union Glacier
- Status: unknown

Hyde Glacier (79°48′S 83°42′W) is a short glacier flowing east through the Edson Hills to join Union Glacier, in the Heritage Range, Antarctica. It was mapped by the United States Geological Survey from surveys and U.S. Navy air photos, 1961–66, and was named by the Advisory Committee on Antarctic Names for William H. Hyde, an ionospheric scientist at Little America V Station in 1958.

== See also ==
- List of glaciers in the Antarctic
- Glaciology
