= Thompson Escarpment =

Coordinates: 79°27′S 83°30′W

Location of Thompson Escarpment, Ellsworth Land, Antarctica

Thompson Escarpment is a steep east-facing escarpment, 8 nautical miles (15 km) long, located at the head of Flanagan Glacier in the Pioneer Heights, Heritage Range. Mapped by United States Geological Survey (USGS) from surveys and U.S. Navy air photos. 1961–66. Named by Advisory Committee on Antarctic Names (US-ACAN) for Commander Robert C. Thompson, operations officer of U.S. Navy Squadron VX-6 during Deep Freeze 1965.
