= Higgins Nunatak =

Higgins Nunatak (79°39′S 82°27′W) is the largest of the Samuel Nunataks, lying near the south end of this group in the Heritage Range in Antarctica. It was mapped by the United States Geological Survey from surveys and U.S. Navy air photos, 1961–66, and was named by the Advisory Committee on Antarctic Names for utilitiesman John C. Higgins, U.S. Navy, a member of the McMurdo Station party during Operation Deep Freeze 1966.
