= Courtney Peak (Antarctica) =

Mountain in Antarctica

Coordinates: 79°14′S 83°35′W

Courtney Peak is a peak, 1,060 metres (3,480 ft) high, in the northern part of the Gross Hills, Heritage Range. It was mapped by the United States Geological Survey from surveys and from U.S. Navy air photos, 1961–66, and named by the Advisory Committee on Antarctic Names for electronics technician Kenneth N. Courtney, U.S. Navy, who through Operation Deep Freeze 1966 contributed to efficient communications during six austral summer seasons.

== See also ==
- Mountains in Antarctica
