= Balish Glacier =

Glacier in Antarctica

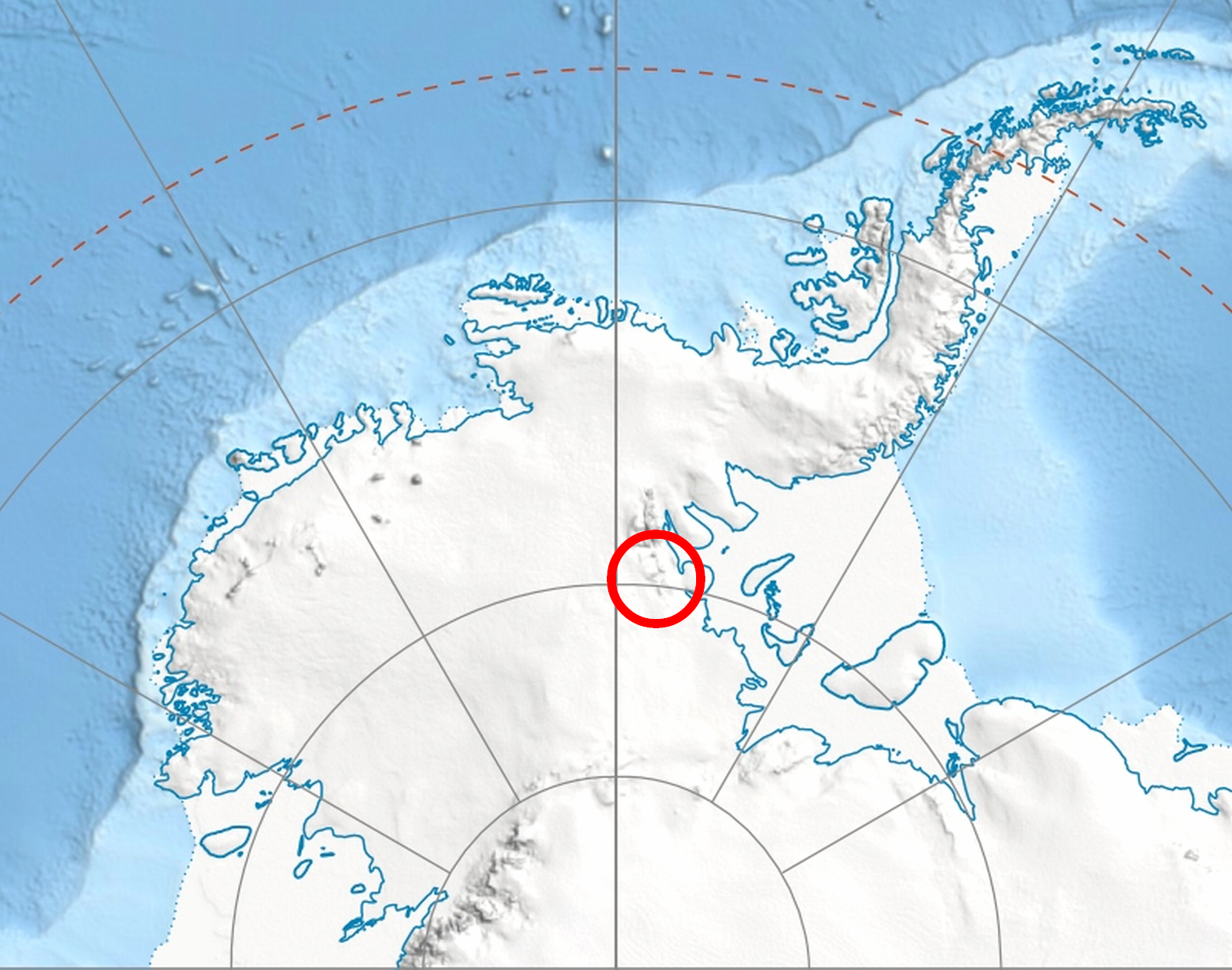
- Location of Heritage Range in Western Antarctica

- Location within Antarctica
- Location: Heritage Range
- Coordinates: 79°25′S 84°30′W
- Length: 18 nmi (33 km; 21 mi)
- Thickness: unknown
- Terminus: Splettstoesser Glacier
- Status: unknown

Balish Glacier (79°25′S 84°30′W) is a glacier, 18 nautical miles (33 km) long, flowing north from the Soholt Peaks to enter Splettstoesser Glacier just northeast of Springer Peak, in the Heritage Range, Ellsworth Mountains. It was mapped by the United States Geological Survey from surveys and from U.S. Navy air photos, 1961–66, and was named by the Advisory Committee on Antarctic Names for Commander Daniel Balish, executive officer of U.S. Navy Squadron VX-6 during Operation Deep Freeze 1965, and commanding officer in 1967.

== See also ==
- List of glaciers in the Antarctic
- Glaciology
