= Mount Capley =

Mountain in Ellsworth Land, Antarctica

Mount Capley (79°32′S 83°13′W) is a peak, 1,810 metres (5,940 ft) high, in the Nimbus Hills of the Heritage Range. It was mapped by the United States Geological Survey from surveys and from U.S. Navy air photos, 1961–66, and named by the Advisory Committee on Antarctic Names for Lieutenant Commander Joe H. Capley, U.S. Navy, pilot on photographic flights over Marie Byrd Land and Ellsworth Land during Operation Deep Freeze 1965 and 1966.

== See also ==
- Mountains in Antarctica
