= Union Glacier =

Glacier in Antarctica

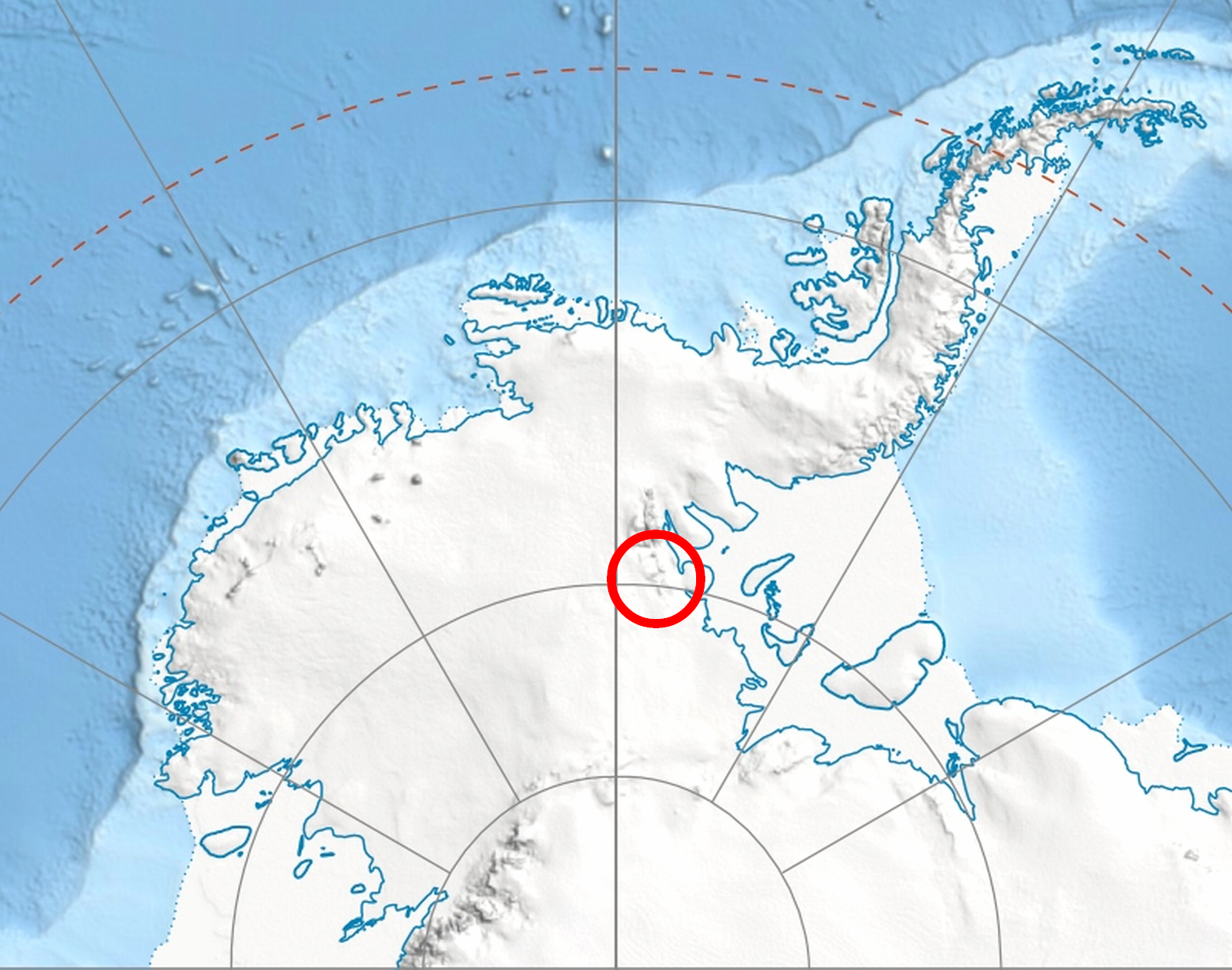
- Location of Heritage Range in Western Antarctica.

- Location within Antarctica
- Location: Heritage Range
- Coordinates: 79°45′S 82°30′W
- Thickness: unknown
- Status: unknown

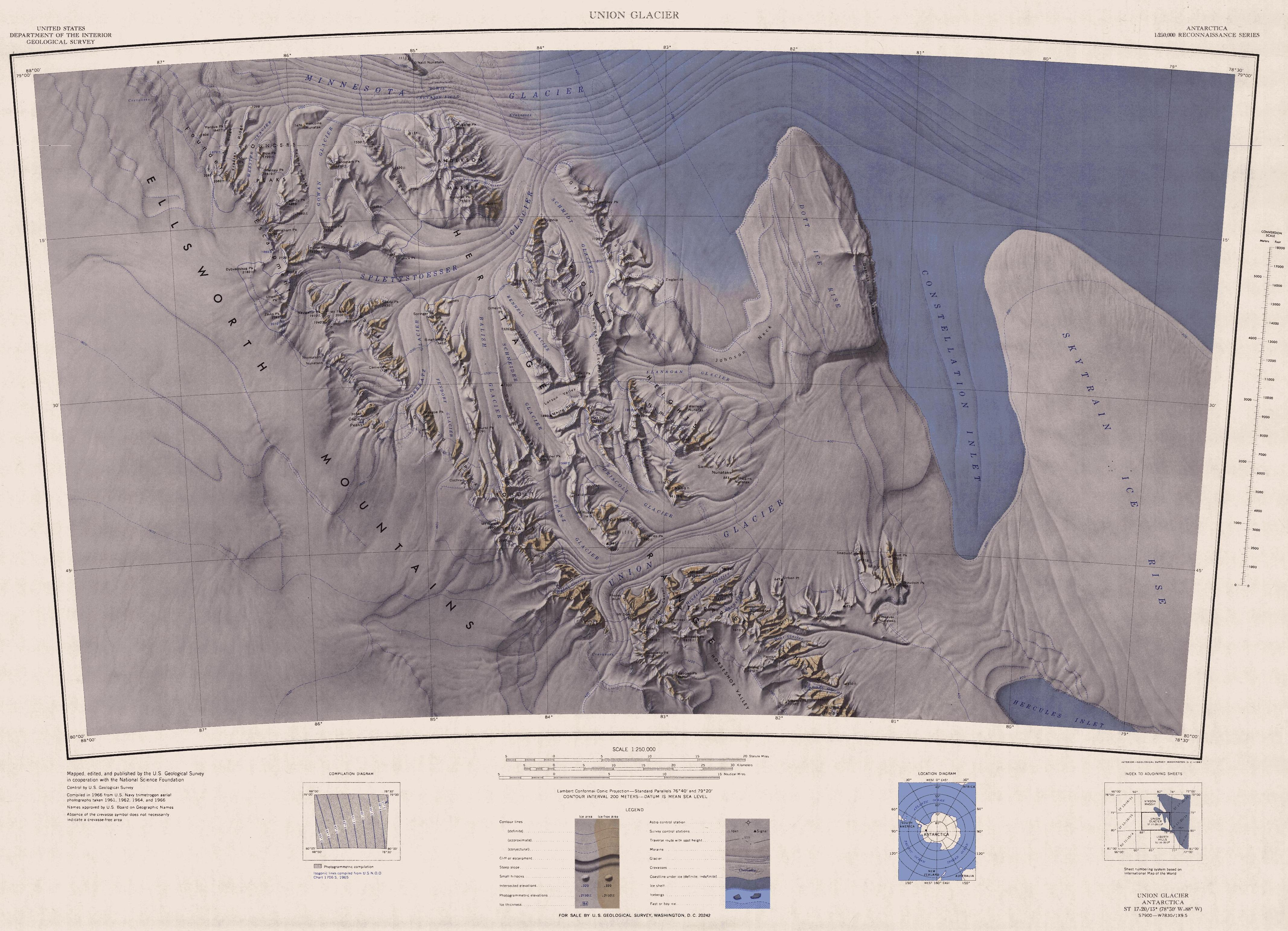
Map of Union Glacier

Union Glacier

Union Glacier (79°45′S 082°30′W), is a large, heavily crevassed glacier which receives the flow of several tributaries and drains through the middle of the Heritage Range, Ellsworth Mountains, Antarctica. The glacier drains from the plateau at Edson Hills on the west side of the range and flows east between Pioneer Heights and Enterprise Hills. Union Glacier was mapped by U.S. Geological Survey (USGS) from surveys and U.S. Navy (USN) air photos, 1961–66. The name was applied by Advisory Committee on Antarctic Names (US-ACAN) in association with the name Heritage Range.

The glacier is the site of Union Glacier Blue-Ice Runway, Union Glacier Camp and Union Glacier Station.

== Maps ==
- Union Glacier. Scale 1:250 000 topographic map. Reston, Virginia: US Geological Survey, 1966.
- Antarctic Digital Database (ADD). Scale 1:250000 topographic map of Antarctica. Scientific Committee on Antarctic Research (SCAR). Since 1993, regularly updated.

== See also ==
- List of glaciers in the Antarctic
- List of Antarctic ice streams
- Glaciology
