= Warm River, Idaho =

- City
- Location of Warm River in Fremont County, Idaho
- Coordinates: 44°07′20″N 111°19′06″W
- Country: United States
- State: Idaho
- County: Fremont

Area
  - Total: 0.68 sq mi (1.76 km^{2})
  - Land: 0.66 sq mi (1.72 km^{2})
  - Water: 0.012 sq mi (0.03 km^{2})
- Elevation: 5,528 ft (1,685 m)

Population (2020)
  - Total: 4
  - Density: 6.0/sq mi (2.3/km^{2})
- Time zone: UTC-7 (Mountain (MST))
  - Summer (DST): UTC-6 (MDT)
- ZIP code: 83420
- Area code: 208
- FIPS code: 16-85420
- GNIS feature ID: 2412181

Warm River is a city in Fremont County, Idaho, United States. The population was 4 at the 2020 census, making it the least populous city in Idaho. It is part of the Rexburg, Idaho Micropolitan Statistical Area.

== History ==
Warm River was incorporated in the 1940s, in order to bring the small resort community into compliance with state law restricting liquor licenses to incorporated municipalities.

== Geography ==
According to the United States Census Bureau, the city has a total area of 0.73 square miles (1.89 km^{2}), of which, 0.72 square miles (1.86 km^{2}) is land and 0.01 square miles (0.03 km^{2}) is water.

== Demographics ==
Historical population
Census	Pop.	Note	%±
1960	20		—
1970	10		−50.0%
1980	2		−80.0%
1990	9		350.0%
2000	10		11.1%
2010	3		−70.0%
2020	4		33.3%
U.S. Decennial Census

=== 2010 census ===
As of the census of 2010, there were 3 people, 2 households, and 0 families residing in the city. The population density was 4.2 inhabitants per square mile (1.6/km^{2}). There were 5 housing units at an average density of 6.9 per square mile (2.7/km^{2}). The racial makeup of the city was 100.0% White.

There were 2 households, of which 100.0% were non-families. 50.0% of all households were made up of individuals, and 50% had someone living alone who was 65 years of age or older. The average household size was 1.50 and the average family size was 0.00.

The median age in the city was 56.5 years. 0.0% of residents were under the age of 18; 0.0% were between the ages of 18 and 24; 0 were from 25 to 44; 2 were from 45 to 64; and 1 were 65 years of age or older. The gender makeup of the city was 1 male and 2 females.

=== 2000 census ===
As of the census of 2000, there were 10 people, 3 households, and 3 families residing in the city. The population density was 13.6 people per square mile (5.3 people/km^{2}). There were 4 housing units at an average density of 5.4 per square mile (2.1/km^{2}). The racial makeup of the city was 100.00% White.

There were 3 households, out of which none had children under the age of 18 living with them, 33.3% were married couples living together, 33.3% had a female householder with no husband present, and 0.0% were non-families. The average household and family size was 3.33.

In the city, the population was spread out, with 30.0% from 18 to 24, 20.0% from 25 to 44, 10.0% from 45 to 64, and 40.0% who were 65 years of age or older. The median age was 45 years. For every 100 females, there were 150.0 males. For every 100 females age 18 and over, there were 150.0 males.

The median income for a household in the city was $51,250, and the median income for a family was $51,250. Males had a median income of $8,750 versus $0 for females. The per capita income for the city was $23,022. None of the population was below the poverty line.

== Education ==
It is located in the Fremont County Joint School District 215.

College of Eastern Idaho includes this county in its catchment zone; however this county is not in its taxation zone.
