= St. Anthony, Idaho =

- City
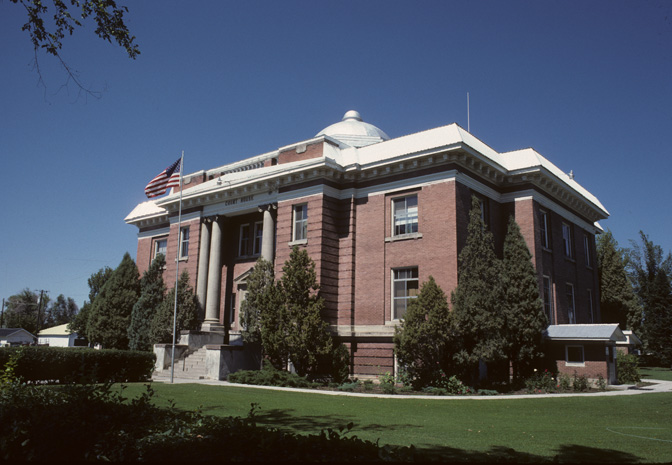
- Fremont County Courthouse in St. Anthony

- Location of St. Anthony in Fremont County, Idaho.

- Location in the United States
- Coordinates: 43°57′59″N 111°41′03″W
- Country: United States
- State: Idaho
- County: Fremont

Area
  - Total: 1.59 sq mi (4.11 km^{2})
  - Land: 1.55 sq mi (4.01 km^{2})
  - Water: 0.042 sq mi (0.11 km^{2})
- Elevation: 4,964 ft (1,513 m)

Population (2020)
  - Total: 3,606
  - Density: 2,330/sq mi (899/km^{2})
- Time zone: UTC-7 (Mountain (MST))
  - Summer (DST): UTC-6 (MDT)
- ZIP Code: 83445
- Area code: 208
- FIPS code: 16-71020
- GNIS feature ID: 2411755
- Website: www.cityofstanthony.org

St. Anthony or Saint Anthony is a city in and the county seat of Fremont County, Idaho, United States. The population was 3,606 at the 2020 census, up from 3,542 in 2010. It is part of the Rexburg, Idaho Micropolitan Statistical Area.

== History ==
Previous to the foundation of St. Anthony, Major Andrew Henry established a short-lived fort a few miles west of where the city stands today. This post was last used in the Fall of 1811, but left a lasting mark on the area as Henry is the namesake for the Henrys Fork of the Snake River, which St. Anthony sits along.

The early history of the city is disputed, with some sources pointing toward St. Anthony being founded in 1888 by members of the Church of Jesus Christ of Latter-day Saints, while others point to it being established in 1890. About this same time, a bridge was built over the Henrys Fork where St. Anthony stands today. The city was named after Saint Anthony Falls in Minnesota.

The railroad came to St. Anthony in 1899 and the first post office was established in 1901. Charles C. Moore arrived on the first train to the city. He taught school in the city and served as postmaster from 1908 to 1913 before being elected as governor of Idaho in 1922. He later died in St. Anthony at the age of 92.

Early in the life of the city, businesses would close their doors around noon on Wednesday to enjoy a day of rest and for the city's ball team to play against those in neighboring towns.

The first LDS Stake to be headquartered in St. Anthony, the Yellowstone Stake, was established in 1909 with David O. McKay presiding at the proceedings. By 1912 the Yellowstone Tabernacle had been erected by the church at a cost of $79,074, which would have cost $1.9 million in 2016.

The first county courthouse was built in 1909, with the first cinema opening in 1911 to show silent films. By 1928 the city had two motion picture theaters, the Rialto and the Rex. The Rialto was the first to bring motion pictures containing audio to St. Anthony.

Today the current post office and the current courthouse are listed on the National Register of Historic Places.

== Geography ==
According to the United States Census Bureau, the city has a total area of 1.55 square miles (4.01 km^{2}), of which, 1.53 square miles (3.96 km^{2}) is land and 0.02 square miles (0.05 km^{2}) is water. St. Anthony is located along the Henrys Fork of the Snake River and on US Highway 20 about 10 miles northeast of Rexburg. The city is situated about 70 miles from the west entrance to Yellowstone National Park.

=== Climate ===
St. Anthony experiences a continental climate (Köppen Dfb) with long, cold, snowy winters and hot summers.

Climate data for St. Anthony, Idaho, 1991–2020 normals, extremes 1895–present
Month	Jan	Feb	Mar	Apr	May	Jun	Jul	Aug	Sep	Oct	Nov	Dec	Year
Record high °F (°C)	52 (11)	60 (16)	74 (23)	85 (29)	90 (32)	100 (38)	98 (37)	98 (37)	95 (35)	86 (30)	77 (25)	65 (18)	100 (38)
Mean maximum °F (°C)	40.3 (4.6)	43.4 (6.3)	58.8 (14.9)	73.1 (22.8)	80.8 (27.1)	87.3 (30.7)	92.5 (33.6)	92.2 (33.4)	86.3 (30.2)	75.3 (24.1)	59.3 (15.2)	43.9 (6.6)	93.8 (34.3)
Mean daily maximum °F (°C)	27.6 (−2.4)	32.2 (0.1)	43.5 (6.4)	55.4 (13.0)	65.0 (18.3)	73.4 (23.0)	83.4 (28.6)	82.8 (28.2)	72.5 (22.5)	57.7 (14.3)	41.3 (5.2)	28.9 (−1.7)	55.3 (13.0)
Daily mean °F (°C)	19.7 (−6.8)	23.2 (−4.9)	33.3 (0.7)	43.0 (6.1)	52.0 (11.1)	59.3 (15.2)	66.9 (19.4)	65.7 (18.7)	56.8 (13.8)	44.6 (7.0)	31.5 (−0.3)	21.1 (−6.1)	43.1 (6.2)
Mean daily minimum °F (°C)	11.9 (−11.2)	14.2 (−9.9)	23.0 (−5.0)	30.6 (−0.8)	38.9 (3.8)	45.2 (7.3)	50.4 (10.2)	48.6 (9.2)	41.2 (5.1)	31.6 (−0.2)	21.8 (−5.7)	13.3 (−10.4)	30.9 (−0.6)
Mean minimum °F (°C)	−13.2 (−25.1)	−8.9 (−22.7)	2.1 (−16.6)	15.2 (−9.3)	24.2 (−4.3)	32.3 (0.2)	39.0 (3.9)	36.6 (2.6)	26.8 (−2.9)	15.6 (−9.1)	0.8 (−17.3)	−11.6 (−24.2)	−18.4 (−28.0)
Record low °F (°C)	−33 (−36)	−34 (−37)	−21 (−29)	1 (−17)	14 (−10)	23 (−5)	23 (−5)	22 (−6)	13 (−11)	1 (−17)	−21 (−29)	−40 (−40)	−40 (−40)
Average precipitation inches (mm)	1.65 (42)	0.89 (23)	1.05 (27)	1.33 (34)	1.95 (50)	1.74 (44)	0.71 (18)	0.62 (16)	1.06 (27)	1.29 (33)	1.12 (28)	1.41 (36)	14.82 (378)
Average snowfall inches (cm)	18.6 (47)	9.5 (24)	3.1 (7.9)	2.0 (5.1)	0.1 (0.25)	0.0 (0.0)	0.0 (0.0)	0.0 (0.0)	0.0 (0.0)	0.7 (1.8)	5.8 (15)	14.2 (36)	54.0 (137)
Average precipitation days (≥ 0.01 in)	10.0	6.7	6.4	7.7	8.4	7.4	4.1	3.6	4.0	6.2	7.2	10.6	82.3
Average snowy days (≥ 0.1 in)	8.7	5.2	2.0	1.0	0.0	0.0	0.0	0.0	0.0	0.3	3.1	8.5	28.8
Source 1: NOAA
Source 2: National Weather Service

== Demographics ==
Historical population
Census	Pop.	Note	%±
1900	411		—
1910	1,238		201.2%
1920	2,957		138.9%
1930	2,778		−6.1%
1940	2,719		−2.1%
1950	2,695		−0.9%
1960	2,700		0.2%
1970	2,877		6.6%
1980	3,212		11.6%
1990	3,010		−6.3%
2000	3,342		11.0%
2010	3,542		6.0%
2020	3,606		1.8%
U.S. Decennial Census

=== 2020 census ===
As of the 2020 census, St. Anthony had a population of 3,606. The median age was 33.2 years. 26.9% of residents were under the age of 18 and 13.8% of residents were 65 years of age or older. For every 100 females there were 118.8 males, and for every 100 females age 18 and over there were 121.6 males age 18 and over.

0.0% of residents lived in urban areas, while 100.0% lived in rural areas.

There were 1,210 households in St. Anthony, of which 35.9% had children under the age of 18 living in them. Of all households, 53.5% were married-couple households, 19.3% were households with a male householder and no spouse or partner present, and 21.8% were households with a female householder and no spouse or partner present. About 24.3% of all households were made up of individuals and 9.8% had someone living alone who was 65 years of age or older.

There were 1,300 housing units, of which 6.9% were vacant. The homeowner vacancy rate was 1.9% and the rental vacancy rate was 5.9%.

Racial composition as of the 2020 census
Race	Number	Percent
White	2,911	80.7%
Black or African American	15	0.4%
American Indian and Alaska Native	38	1.1%
Asian	13	0.4%
Native Hawaiian and Other Pacific Islander	11	0.3%
Some other race	396	11.0%
Two or more races	222	6.2%
Hispanic or Latino (of any race)	603	16.7%

=== 2010 census ===
As of the census of 2010, there were 3,542 people, 1,118 households, and 857 families residing in the city. The population density was 2,315.0 inhabitants per square mile (893.8/km^{2}). There were 1,252 housing units at an average density of 818.3 per square mile (315.9/km^{2}). The racial makeup of the city was 85.9% White, 0.5% African American, 0.8% Native American, 0.5% Asian, 0.2% Pacific Islander, 10.6% from other races, and 1.6% from two or more races. Hispanic or Latino of any race were 20.9% of the population.

There were 1,118 households, of which 45.3% had children under the age of 18 living with them, 58.8% were married couples living together, 12.1% had a female householder with no husband present, 5.8% had a male householder with no wife present, and 23.3% were non-families. 20.3% of all households were made up of individuals, and 7.7% had someone living alone who was 65 years of age or older. The average household size was 2.94 and the average family size was 3.39.

The median age in the city was 29.8 years. 31.7% of residents were under the age of 18; 10.1% were between the ages of 18 and 24; 27.3% were from 25 to 44; 20.5% were from 45 to 64; and 10.4% were 65 years of age or older. The gender makeup of the city was 54.5% male and 45.5% female.

=== 2000 census ===
As of the census of 2000, there were 3,342 people, 1,091 households, and 819 families residing in the city. The population density was 2,565.0 inhabitants per square mile (990.4/km^{2}). There were 1,218 housing units at an average density of 934.8 per square mile (360.9/km^{2}). The racial makeup of the city was 89.05% White, 0.21% African American, 0.69% Native American, 0.66% Asian, 0.06% Pacific Islander, 7.09% from other races, and 2.24% from two or more races. Hispanic or Latino of any race were 15.38% of the population.

There were 1,091 households, out of which 40.1% had children under the age of 18 living with them, 59.9% were married couples living together, 11.5% had a female householder with no husband present, and 24.9% were non-families. 22.1% of all households were made up of individuals, and 10.1% had someone living alone who was 65 years of age or older. The average household size was 2.94 and the average family size was 3.47.

In the city, the population was spread out, with 33.2% under the age of 18, 10.1% from 18 to 24, 26.8% from 25 to 44, 18.5% from 45 to 64, and 11.4% who were 65 years of age or older. The median age was 30 years. For every 100 females, there were 107.6 males. For every 100 females age 18 and over, there were 109.8 males.

The median income for a household in the city was $31,023, and the median income for a family was $37,995. Males had a median income of $26,625 versus $22,734 for females. The per capita income for the city was $12,898. About 10.3% of families and 15.6% of the population were below the poverty line, including 20.8% of those under age 18 and 14.2% of those age 65 or over.

== Parks and recreation ==
Within St. Anthony there are several city parks and walking trails offering many different recreational activities. Along the south side of the Henrys Fork there is the Greenway Trail, which starts near the US 20 junction with Bridge Street and continues south for a few miles. There is also a swimming area along the river, several baseball diamonds and a skate park.

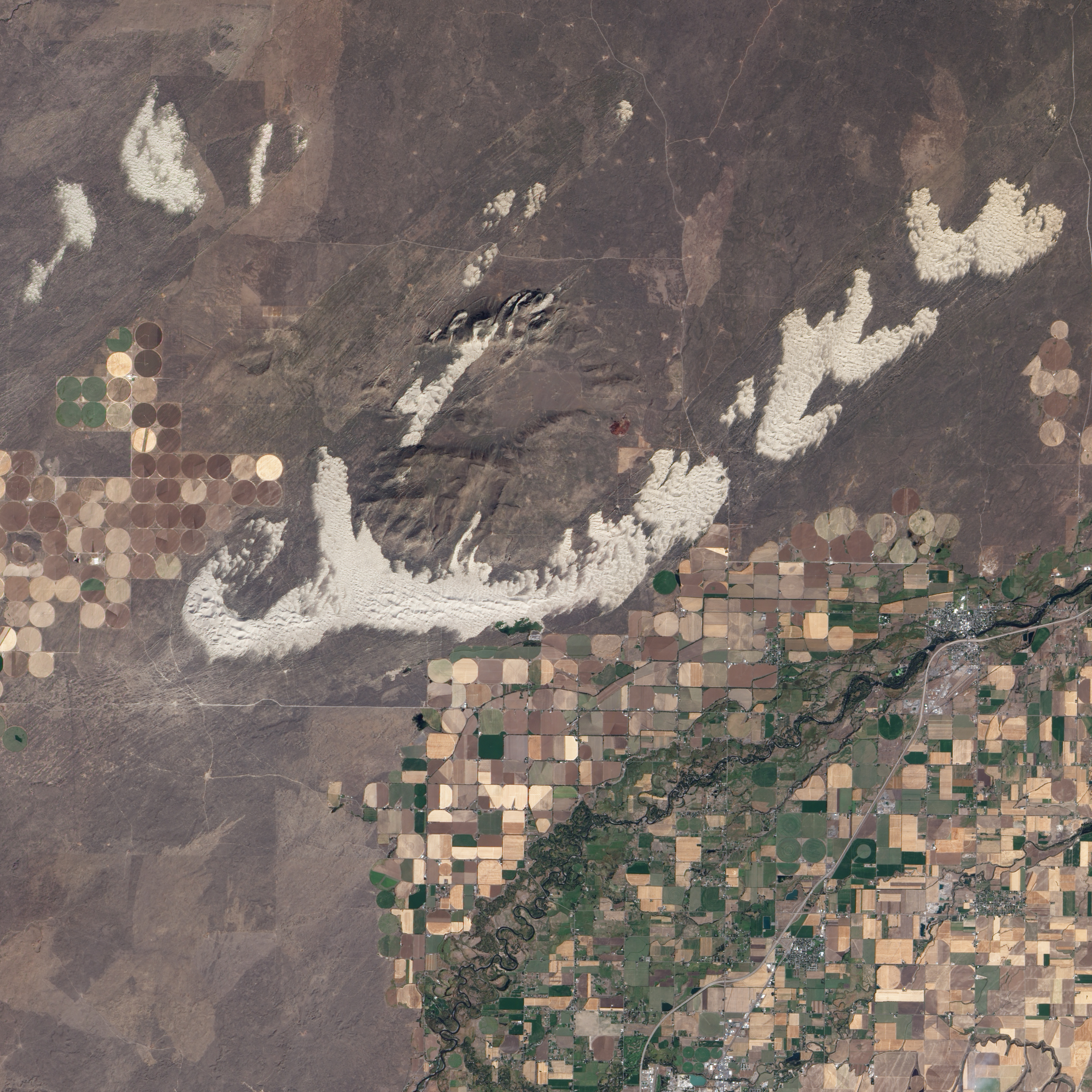
The St. Anthony Sand Dunes.

Located north and northwest of the city is the St. Anthony Sand Dunes, a 10,600-acre area of white quartz sand protected by a wilderness study area and containing one of the largest herds of wintering elk in the United States. Along with the 2,500 elk that winter near the sand dunes, there are also 1,500 mule deer and 500 moose in the area. During their time in around the sand dunes, the big game will shed their antlers and come spring, several hundred people are known to come to the dunes to collect these. This area is also popular for off-road vehicles and bonfires. There are several resorts surrounding the dunes. Some of the dunes reach up to 400 feet tall.

== Government and infrastructure ==
The Idaho Department of Correction operates the St. Anthony Work Camp in St. Anthony.

The United States Postal Service operates the Saint Anthony Post Office in Saint Anthony.

St. Anthony is part of the Fremont County Joint School District. Within the city there is Henrys Fork Elementary, South Fremont Junior High and South Fremont Senior High. For both junior and senior high school, St. Anthony draws in students from nearby Parker and Teton.

== Education ==
It is located in the Fremont County Joint School District 215. Schools in St. Anthony include Henry's Fork Elementary School, Parker-Egin Elementary School, South Fremont Junior High School, and South Fremont High School.

College of Eastern Idaho includes this county in its catchment zone; however this county is not in its taxation zone.

== Notable people ==
- Brandon Bair, former NFL player for Kansas City Chiefs, Oakland Raiders, and Philadelphia Eagles.
- Earl W. Bascom, rodeo pioneer, Idaho Rodeo Hall of Fame inductee, "Father of Modern Rodeo"
- Jason Buck, former NFL defensive lineman and Super Bowl XXVI Champion
- Dean Cain, actor, played Clark Kent / Superman
- Erik Estrada, actor and police officer.
- Brad Harris, television and film actor
- Sherman P. Lloyd, Utah State Senator and US representative from Utah
- Charles C. Moore, politician who served as governor of Idaho from 1923 to 1927.
