= Newdale, Idaho =

- City
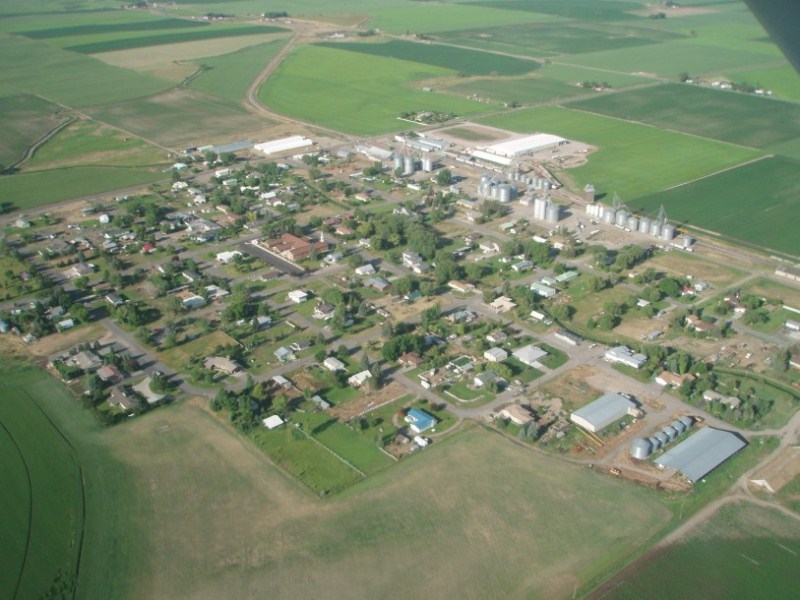
- Photo of Newdale from above, facing south-west

- Location of Newdale in Fremont County, Idaho.
- Coordinates: 43°53′11″N 111°36′14″W
- Country: United States
- State: Idaho
- County: Fremont

Area
  - Total: 0.19 sq mi (0.48 km^{2})
  - Land: 0.19 sq mi (0.48 km^{2})
  - Water: 0 sq mi (0.00 km^{2})
- Elevation: 5,089 ft (1,551 m)

Population (2020)
  - Total: 337
  - Density: 1,707.6/sq mi (659.32/km^{2})
- Time zone: UTC-7 (Mountain (MST))
  - Summer (DST): UTC-6 (MDT)
- ZIP code: 83436
- Area code: 208
- FIPS code: 16-56800
- GNIS feature ID: 2411245
- Website: cityofnewdale.org

Newdale is a city in Fremont County, Idaho, United States. The population was 337 at the 2020 census. It is part of the Rexburg, Idaho Micropolitan Statistical Area.

== History ==
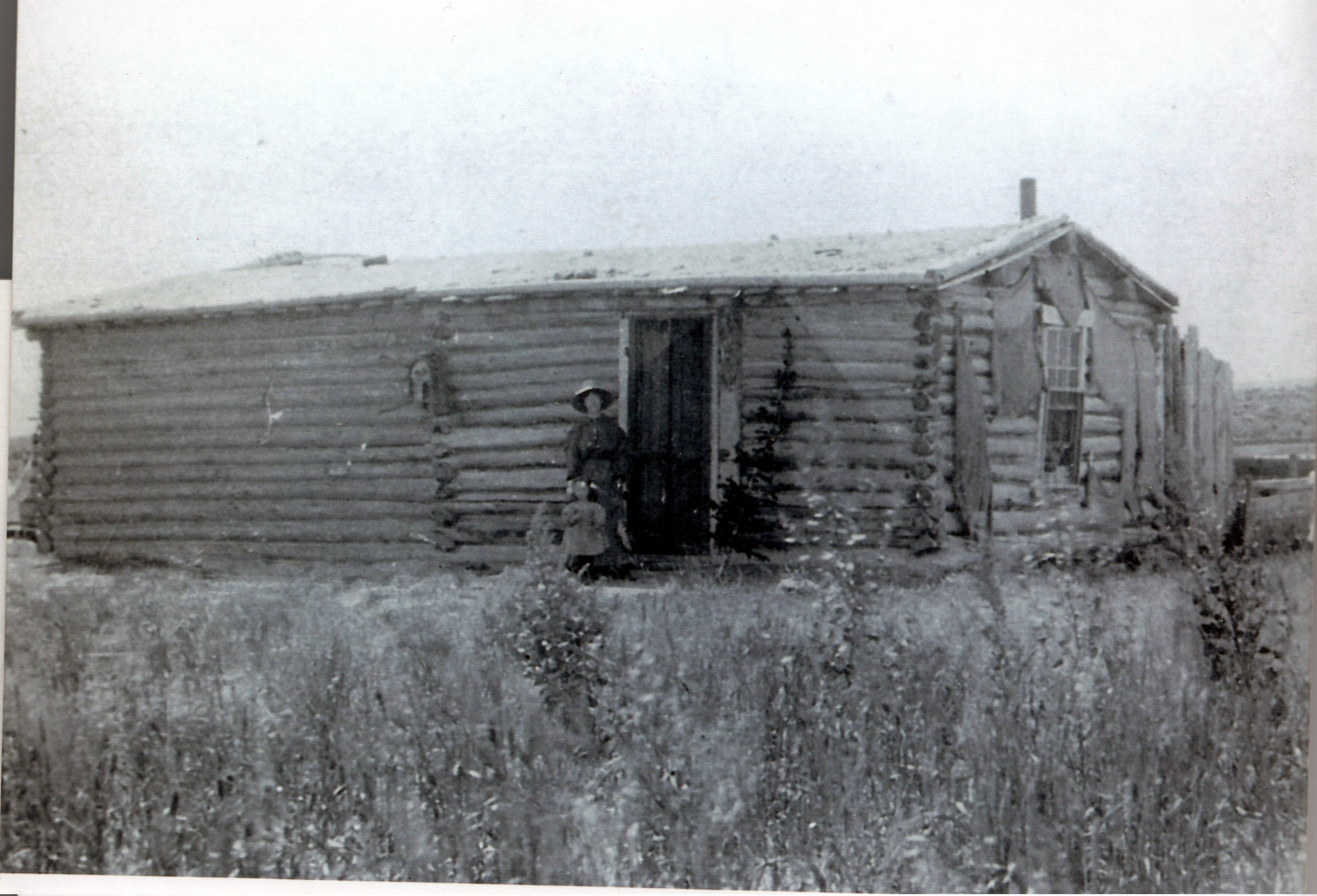
Log cabin and homestead in the Newdale area. Early 1900s.

In the early 1900s, there were only a few homes and farms scattered across the vast terrain east of Teton City. Early settlers in this area include family names such as Siddoway, Briggs, and Schwendiman. The Schwendiman family, consisting of 6 brothers and their mother, a widow, relocated from Paris Idaho to Teton Idaho in 1894. As the Schwendiman brothers grew older and married, they began to homestead and dry farm in the area east of Newdale, and obtained land in 160 acre parcels via the Homestead Acts. Part of this land includes where the City of Newdale now sits. Many families in this area would live on their farms, working from spring to fall, but would move to Teton or other nearby towns during the winter months.

In 1912, a one-room rock school house was built in Bowerman, an area 2 miles east of present-day Newdale, to accommodate approximately 15 school children living in the surrounding area. The school house was also used for LDS Church meetings. Bowerman may have developed into a village, if had not been for the railroad being built in the Newdale area, which encouraged growth.

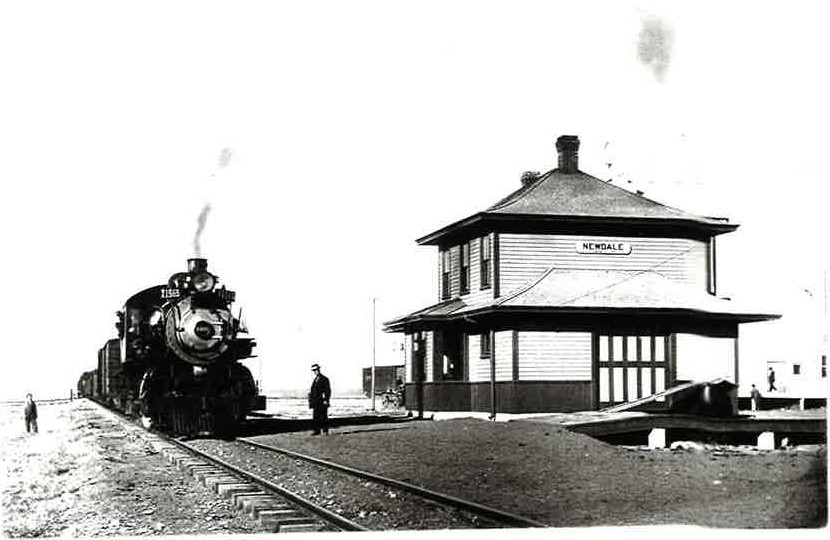
Newdale Train Depot

The Oregon Short Line Railroad wanted to expand into this part of the country and on June 27, 1914, purchased a right of way from brothers Sam and Fred Schwendiman to lay tracks for a new branch line. The new railroad attracted people to Newdale and in 1914 the Edwin Moroni Stocks family built a house and the Leo Schofield family built a cabin. Mrs. Hansine C. Hansen, a widow, was also one of the first people to move in, and had her sons move her house from Teton, perhaps early in 1915. Burt Garner was also one of the first to build a home and move in, and he also started a grocery store.

Sam and Fred Schwendiman incorporated the Newdale Investment Company for commercial purposes, which erected a rock building that housed, on the ground floor, a hardware supply and drug store. The other part of the building was leased to the First National Bank of Newdale, an independent bank managed by G.C. Alden. Upstairs, a fine recreation hall was completed for dancing, with a stage where operettas and drama productions could be given. The facility formally opened in June 1915 and attracted considerable attention at the time. A train depot was also built in 1915, and catered to both freight and passenger service. Later that summer, in August, a group of men representing the Chamber of Commerce came to Newdale by train and were entertained at this community center before making the loop back to Idaho Falls.

The US Post Office established a Newdale Post Office and on February 15, 1916, appointed Sam Schwendiman as the first post master.

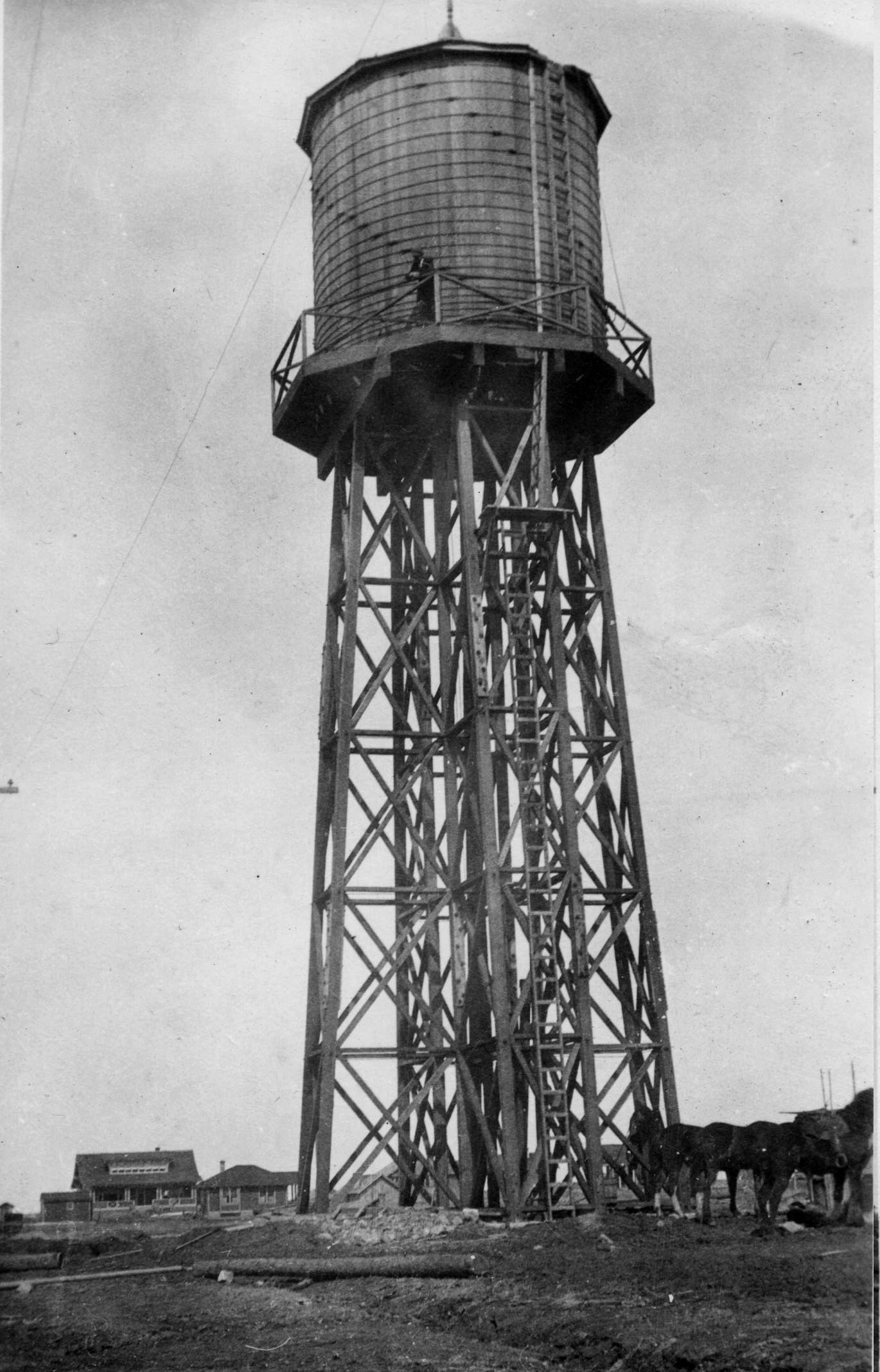
Newdale ID Water Tower

On March 17, 1916, the water system was completed, including a wooden elevated water storage tank and underground wooded water mains. The project cost $15,000 (some records say $18,000).

The Newdale Investment Company made land available for the townsite of Newdale, which was surveyed and plotted by engineers Cotton and Wilson in April 1916. In May, several hundred shade trees, apple trees, and other fruit trees were planted throughout the town. The LDS Newdale Ward was organized on December 17, 1916, with Lester Hanson as the first bishop. School and church meetings were held in a vacant building on Main Street. In 1916, a contract was negotiated with the Utah Power and Light Company, to bring electricity to Newdale. Telephone service came shortly after. The Idaho Falls Daily Post published a notice with headlines that read: "Newdale bright lights beckon to the world. All over the Upper Snake Valley the question has been asked, 'What are these many electric lights we see twinkling up on the bench every night?'"

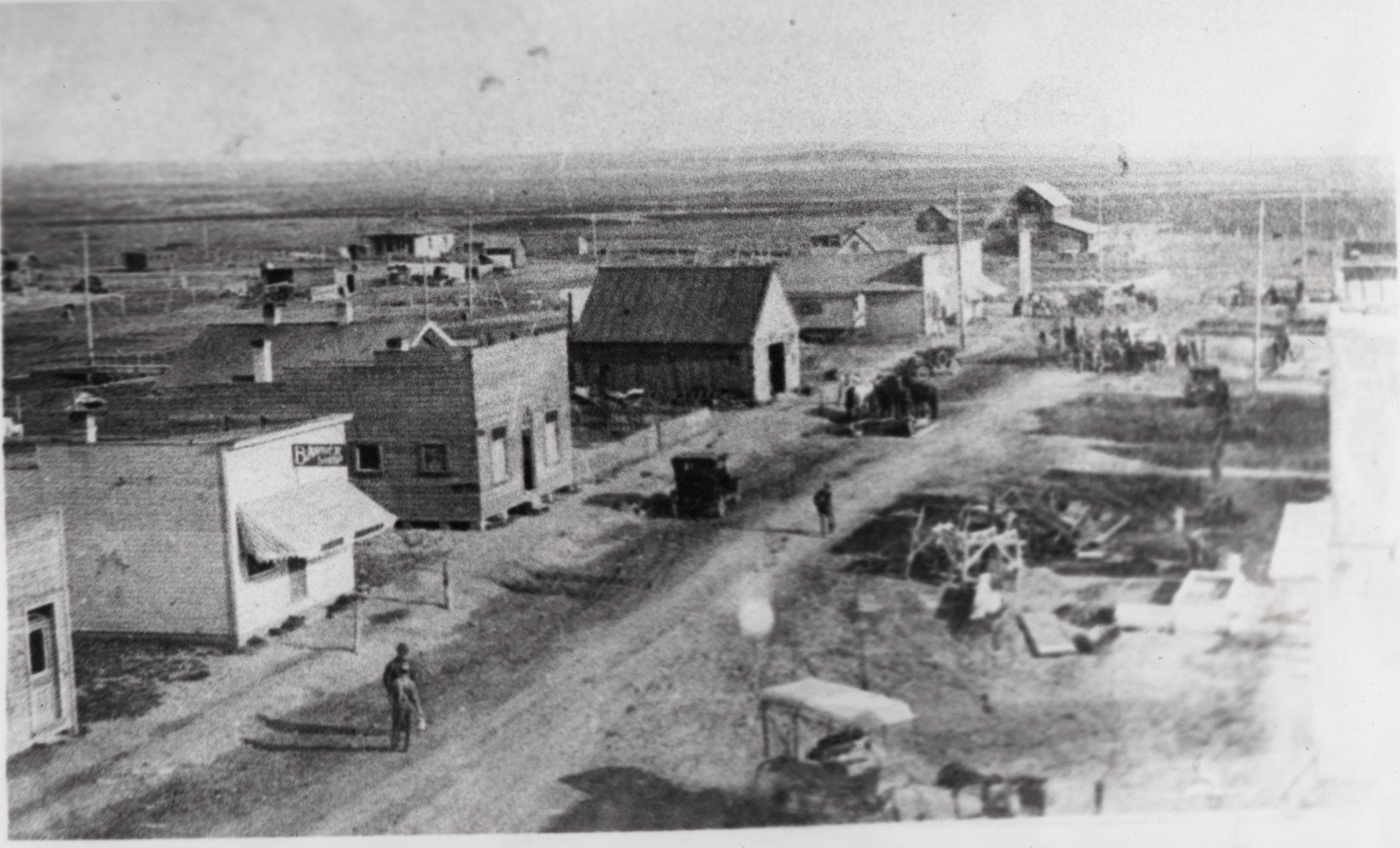
Main Street in Newdale Idaho, facing south. Photo taken approximately 1913 or 1914.

The Village of Newdale was incorporated in January 1917. The first town board was: Joseph Fleischman as chairman, Frank Williams as clerk, Burt L. Garner as treasurer, and Edwin Stocks, George Bean, Henry Campeau as board members. In the fall of 1915 an incorporated Company, known as the Farmer's Warehouse Company, built a large warehouse in Newdale, which became the shipping point for crops raised in the surrounding area. Sugar beets were the main crop of the area, followed by grains, alfalfa, and seed peas. Potatoes would become the main crop after 1920.

In 1918, the Spanish Influenza hit, and the whole town masked their faces when going out in public. School was let out for the year because of the flu.

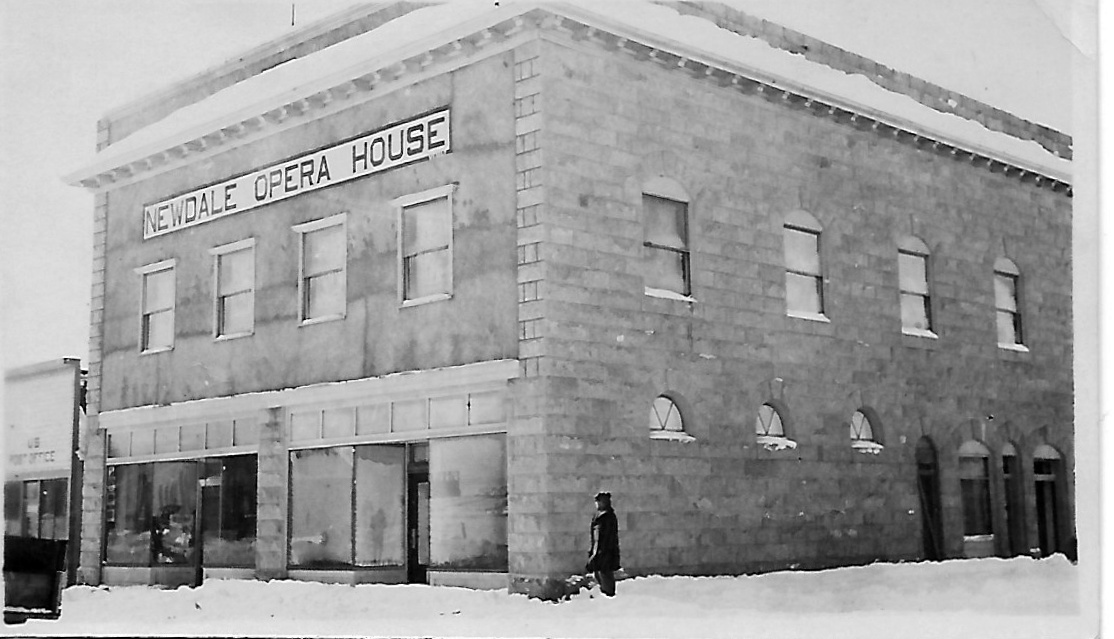
Newdale Opera House on Main St. Newdale Idaho

The year 1918 produced one of the best crops that has even been produced in this area. Newdale grew rapidly and by 1919, after being only four years old, it had a national bank, a mercantile and drug store, a barber shop, a blacksmith, a carpenter shop, a printing shop, a real estate office, a livery stable, several general stores, lumber yards, hardware stores, implement yards, warehouses, grain elevators, commission houses, hotels, restaurants, and an opera house. It is estimated that Newdale doubled in size in 1919. The value of city lots had raised several times.

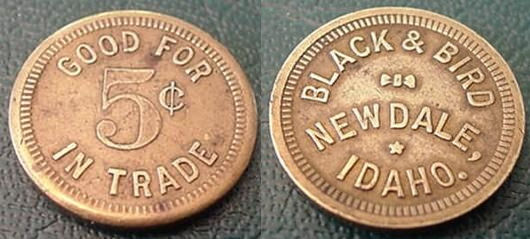
A token from a billiards pool hall that existed in Newdale ID in 1916.

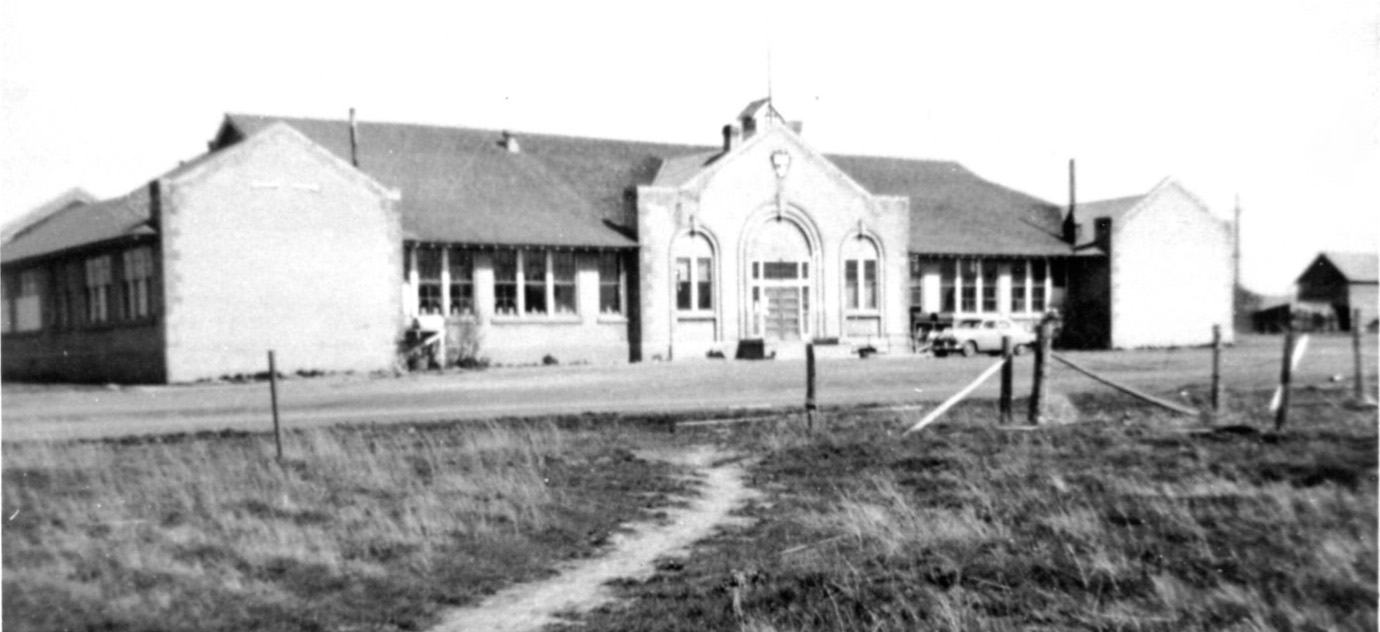
School House Newdale ID 1919

The people of Newdale were very progressive and hard workers and had a desire to make the area a truly good place to live. In December 1919, an 8-room, brick school house was completed on a piece of land donated by Sam Schwendiman, where the Newdale City Park is today. Leigh Chantrill was a young boy at the time, and later said: "It was really exciting when the new school house was completed enough so we could use it for school and church meetings". Its classrooms were heated by wood stove, and had no indoor plumbing. A playground was also built including swings and a baseball diamond. Students would attend school in Newdale from 1st to 8th grade, and then go to school in Teton for freshman and sophomore years, and Sugar City for high school. The Newdale school house was also used for LDS church meetings until a church house was built in 1952.

An agriculture depression in the early 1920s hurt the town, and many families lost their homes and farms to creditors, and were forced to leave Newdale. In 1924, when John Schwendiman was asked to be bishop of the Newdale LDS ward, he said this about the state of the town: “Newdale was half deserted. Some houses had burned down. Others were moved away and several were empty. The town was bonded for over $100,000 for the school house and water works.” The Great Depression of the 1930s had similar negative effects. The beat dump closed down but the potato industry would continue to expand. By 1944, only $1000 had been paid off in principal on the cities debts. The 1940s brought a new generation of farmers, with a lot of thought and effort being put towards irrigation. They used wells and dams. Sprinkler irrigation would double or triple the amount of usable farm land in the area.

An LDS church house was completed and dedicated in 1952.

In 1967, the City of Newdale purchased the Newdale School house and property, which was no longer in use, and turned it into a city park over the next few years. It was also at this time that the streets of Newdale were officially named (from West to East): R.R. Street (Railroad), Main Street, Church Street, Park Street, and Schwendiman Park Road.

A swimming pool was built in Newdale with a new well to supply the water. The pool failed shortly after opening, due to lack of patronage. Newdale wells produce warm water.

Newdale is the nearest city to the Teton Dam, which failed on June 5, 1976. Newdale did not receive any flooding or damage, due to its elevation and position relative to the dam.

== Geography ==
Newdale is located one mile below the Teton Dam.

According to the United States Census Bureau, the city has a total area of 0.21 square miles (0.54 km^{2}) (134.4 acres), all of it land.

=== Climate ===
According to the Köppen climate classification, Newdale has a warm-summer humid continental climate (Köppen climate classification: Dfb).

Climate data for Newdale, Idaho, 1991–2020 simulated normals (5072 ft elevation)
Month	Jan	Feb	Mar	Apr	May	Jun	Jul	Aug	Sep	Oct	Nov	Dec	Year
Mean daily maximum °F (°C)	28.6 (−1.9)	33.1 (0.6)	44.1 (6.7)	54.9 (12.7)	64.8 (18.2)	73.0 (22.8)	83.3 (28.5)	83.1 (28.4)	72.7 (22.6)	57.7 (14.3)	41.7 (5.4)	29.5 (−1.4)	55.5 (13.1)
Daily mean °F (°C)	19.6 (−6.9)	23.4 (−4.8)	33.3 (0.7)	42.1 (5.6)	50.9 (10.5)	58.3 (14.6)	66.0 (18.9)	64.9 (18.3)	56.1 (13.4)	43.9 (6.6)	31.1 (−0.5)	20.8 (−6.2)	42.5 (5.8)
Mean daily minimum °F (°C)	10.6 (−11.9)	13.6 (−10.2)	22.5 (−5.3)	29.3 (−1.5)	37.0 (2.8)	43.5 (6.4)	48.6 (9.2)	46.8 (8.2)	39.4 (4.1)	30.0 (−1.1)	22.1 (−5.5)	16.2 (−8.8)	30.0 (−1.1)
Average precipitation inches (mm)	1.30 (32.93)	0.85 (21.62)	1.03 (26.14)	1.30 (33.11)	1.95 (49.51)	1.57 (39.94)	0.60 (15.17)	0.71 (17.99)	1.06 (27.03)	1.33 (33.90)	1.00 (25.40)	1.29 (32.72)	13.99 (355.46)
Average dew point °F (°C)	15.4 (−9.2)	17.4 (−8.1)	22.8 (−5.1)	26.1 (−3.3)	32.9 (0.5)	38.7 (3.7)	40.1 (4.5)	38.7 (3.7)	33.4 (0.8)	28.0 (−2.2)	22.1 (−5.5)	16.2 (−8.8)	27.7 (−2.4)
Source: Prism Climate Group

== Demographics ==
Historical population
Census	Pop.	Note	%±
1920	381		—
1930	368		−3.4%
1940	356		−3.3%
1950	312		−12.4%
1960	272		−12.8%
1970	267		−1.8%
1980	329		23.2%
1990	377		14.6%
2000	358		−5.0%
2010	323		−9.8%
2020	337		4.3%
U.S. Decennial Census

=== 2010 census ===
As of the census of 2010, there were 323 people, 104 households, and 90 families residing in the city. The population density was 1,538.1 inhabitants per square mile (593.9/km^{2}). There were 112 housing units at an average density of 533.3 per square mile (205.9/km^{2}). The racial makeup of the city was 90.7% White, 7.4% from other races, and 1.9% from two or more races. Hispanic or Latino of any race were 12.7% of the population.

There were 104 households, of which 41.3% had children under the age of 18 living with them, 78.8% were married couples living together, 3.8% had a female householder with no husband present, 3.8% had a male householder with no wife present, and 13.5% were non-families. 11.5% of all households were made up of individuals, and 4.8% had someone living alone who was 65 years of age or older. The average household size was 3.11 and the average family size was 3.38.

The median age in the city was 33.8 years. 31.3% of residents were under the age of 18; 8.6% were between the ages of 18 and 24; 20.5% were from 25 to 44; 24.5% were from 45 to 64; and 15.2% were 65 years of age or older. The gender makeup of the city was 49.8% male and 50.2% female.

=== 2000 census ===
As of the census of 2000, there were 358 people, 98 households, and 83 families residing in the city. The population density was 1,458.3 inhabitants per square mile (563.1/km^{2}). There were 110 housing units at an average density of 448.1 per square mile (173.0/km^{2}). The racial makeup of the city was 85.75% White, 0.28% African American, 13.69% from other races, and 0.28% from two or more races. Hispanic or Latino of any race were 15.92% of the population.

There were 98 households, out of which 53.1% had children under the age of 18 living with them, 76.5% were married couples living together, 6.1% had a female householder with no husband present, and 14.3% were non-families. 12.2% of all households were made up of individuals, and 7.1% had someone living alone who was 65 years of age or older. The average household size was 3.65 and the average family size was 4.00.

In the city, the population was spread out, with 41.6% under the age of 18, 7.0% from 18 to 24, 25.4% from 25 to 44, 16.2% from 45 to 64, and 9.8% who were 65 years of age or older. The median age was 26 years. For every 100 females, there were 106.9 males. For every 100 females age 18 and over, there were 97.2 males.

The median income for a household in the city was $40,938, and the median income for a family was $41,500. Males had a median income of $35,455 versus $17,500 for females. The per capita income for the city was $12,532. About 11.5% of families and 14.4% of the population were below the poverty line, including 21.3% of those under age 18 and none of those age 65 or over.

== Education ==
It is located in the Sugar-Salem Joint School District 322. The district's comprehensive high school is Sugar-Salem High School.

College of Eastern Idaho includes this county in its catchment zone; however this county is not in its taxation zone.

== See also ==
- List of cities in Idaho
