= Drummond, Idaho =

- City
- Location of Drummond in Fremont County, Idaho.
- Coordinates: 44°00′02″N 111°20′37″W
- Country: United States
- State: Idaho
- County: Fremont

Area
  - Total: 0.097 sq mi (0.25 km^{2})
  - Land: 0.097 sq mi (0.25 km^{2})
  - Water: 0 sq mi (0.00 km^{2})
- Elevation: 5,604 ft (1,708 m)

Population (2020)
  - Total: 13
  - Density: 130/sq mi (52/km^{2})
- Time zone: UTC-7 (Mountain (MST))
  - Summer (DST): UTC-6 (MDT)
- ZIP code: 83420
- Area code: 208
- FIPS code: 16-22780
- GNIS feature ID: 2410359
- Website: www.drummond.city

Drummond is a city in Fremont County, Idaho, United States. The population was 13 at the 2020 census. It is part of the Rexburg, Idaho Micropolitan Statistical Area.

== Geography ==
According to the United States Census Bureau, the city has a total area of 0.10 square miles (0.26 km^{2}), all of it land.

Drummond is east of U.S. Highway 20 on State Highway 32.

=== Climate ===
According to the Köppen climate classification, Drummond has a warm-summer humid continental climate (Köppen climate classification: Dfb).

Climate data for Drummond, Idaho 1991–2020 simulated normals (5591 ft elevation)
Month	Jan	Feb	Mar	Apr	May	Jun	Jul	Aug	Sep	Oct	Nov	Dec	Year
Mean daily maximum °F (°C)	28.8 (−1.8)	32.9 (0.5)	42.3 (5.7)	52.2 (11.2)	62.6 (17.0)	71.1 (21.7)	81.3 (27.4)	81.1 (27.3)	71.1 (21.7)	55.8 (13.2)	40.1 (4.5)	29.3 (−1.5)	54.0 (12.2)
Daily mean °F (°C)	19.6 (−6.9)	22.8 (−5.1)	31.3 (−0.4)	39.9 (4.4)	49.1 (9.5)	56.5 (13.6)	64.2 (17.9)	63.1 (17.3)	54.7 (12.6)	42.4 (5.8)	29.8 (−1.2)	20.3 (−6.5)	41.1 (5.1)
Mean daily minimum °F (°C)	10.4 (−12.0)	12.7 (−10.7)	20.5 (−6.4)	27.7 (−2.4)	35.6 (2.0)	41.9 (5.5)	47.1 (8.4)	45.3 (7.4)	38.1 (3.4)	29.1 (−1.6)	19.6 (−6.9)	11.3 (−11.5)	28.3 (−2.1)
Average precipitation inches (mm)	2.09 (53.07)	1.54 (39.00)	1.61 (41.02)	1.90 (48.22)	2.32 (58.99)	1.85 (47.02)	0.78 (19.75)	0.90 (22.87)	1.35 (34.22)	1.74 (44.14)	1.66 (42.06)	2.29 (58.09)	20.03 (508.45)
Average dew point °F (°C)	15.3 (−9.3)	16.5 (−8.6)	21.6 (−5.8)	25.3 (−3.7)	32.4 (0.2)	38.5 (3.6)	40.8 (4.9)	38.1 (3.4)	32.7 (0.4)	27.1 (−2.7)	21.2 (−6.0)	15.4 (−9.2)	27.1 (−2.7)
Source: Prism Climate Group

== Demographics ==
Historical population
Census	Pop.	Note	%±
1920	115		—
1930	61		−47.0%
1940	66		8.2%
1950	59		−10.6%
1960	31		−47.5%
1970	13		−58.1%
1980	25		92.3%
1990	37		48.0%
2000	15		−59.5%
2010	16		6.7%
2020	13		−18.7%
U.S. Decennial Census

=== 2010 census ===
As of the census of 2010, there were 16 people, 8 households, and 3 families residing in the city. The population density was 160.0 inhabitants per square mile (61.8/km^{2}). There were 10 housing units at an average density of 100.0 per square mile (38.6/km^{2}). The racial makeup of the city was 93.8% White and 6.3% from two or more races.

There were 8 households, of which 12.5% had children under the age of 18 living with them, 37.5% were married couples living together, and 62.5% were non-families. 50.0% of all households were made up of individuals, and 37.5% had someone living alone who was 65 years of age or older. The average household size was 2.00 and the average family size was 3.33.

The median age in the city was 51.5 years. 18.7% of residents were under the age of 18; 0.1% were between the ages of 18 and 24; 25.1% were from 25 to 44; 18.8% were from 45 to 64; and 37.5% were 65 years of age or older. The gender makeup of the city was 50.0% male and 50.0% female.

=== 2000 census ===
As of the census of 2000, there were 15 people, 7 households, and 3 families residing in the city. The population density was 139.9 inhabitants per square mile (54.0/km^{2}). There were 12 housing units at an average density of 111.9 per square mile (43.2/km^{2}). The racial makeup of the city was 100.00% White. Hispanic or Latino of any race were 6.67% of the population.

There were 7 households, out of which none had children under the age of 18 living with them, 28.6% were married couples living together, 14.3% had a female householder with no husband present, and 57.1% were non-families. 42.9% of all households were made up of individuals, and none had someone living alone who was 65 years of age or older. The average household size was 2.14 and the average family size was 3.00.

In the city, the population was spread out, with 6.7% under the age of 18, 20.0% from 18 to 24, 33.3% from 25 to 44, 26.7% from 45 to 64, and 13.3% who were 65 years of age or older. The median age was 42 years. For every 100 females, there were 114.3 males. For every 100 females age 18 and over, there were 133.3 males.

The median income for a household in the city was $12,500, and the median income for a family was $52,917. Males had a median income of $36,250 versus $0 for females. The per capita income for the city was $15,164. There were no families and 35.7% of the population living below the poverty line, including no under eighteens and none of those over 64.

== Education ==
It is located in the Fremont County Joint School District 215.

College of Eastern Idaho includes this county in its catchment zone; however this county is not in its taxation zone.

== See also ==
- List of cities in Idaho
