= Parker, Idaho =

- City
- Location of Parker in Fremont County, Idaho.
- Coordinates: 43°57′25″N 111°45′15″W
- Country: United States
- State: Idaho
- County: Fremont

Area
  - Total: 0.35 sq mi (0.90 km^{2})
  - Land: 0.35 sq mi (0.90 km^{2})
  - Water: 0 sq mi (0.00 km^{2})
- Elevation: 4,928 ft (1,502 m)

Population (2020)
  - Total: 302
  - Density: 870/sq mi (340/km^{2})
- Time zone: UTC-7 (Mountain (MST))
  - Summer (DST): UTC-6 (MDT)
- ZIP code: 83438
- Area code: 208
- FIPS code: 16-60760
- GNIS feature ID: 2411373

Parker is a city in southeastern Fremont County, Idaho, United States. The population was 302 at the 2020 census. It is part of the Rexburg, Idaho Micropolitan Statistical Area.

== Geography ==
According to the United States Census Bureau, the city has a total area of 0.35 square miles (0.91 km^{2}), all of it land.

== Demographics ==
Historical population
Census	Pop.	Note	%±
1910	432		—
1920	496		14.8%
1930	286		−42.3%
1940	384		34.3%
1950	306		−20.3%
1960	284		−7.2%
1970	266		−6.3%
1980	262		−1.5%
1990	288		9.9%
2000	319		10.8%
2010	305		−4.4%
2020	302		−1.0%
U.S. Decennial Census

=== 2010 census ===
As of the census of 2010, there were 305 people, 99 households, and 76 families residing in the city. The population density was 871.4 inhabitants per square mile (336.4/km^{2}). There were 107 housing units at an average density of 305.7 per square mile (118.0/km^{2}). The racial makeup of the city was 94.8% White, 2.3% Native American, and 3.0% from other races. Hispanic or Latino of any race were 4.6% of the population.

There were 99 households, of which 48.5% had children under the age of 18 living with them, 68.7% were married couples living together, 7.1% had a female householder with no husband present, 1.0% had a male householder with no wife present, and 23.2% were non-families. 20.2% of all households were made up of individuals, and 12.1% had someone living alone who was 65 years of age or older. The average household size was 3.08 and the average family size was 3.66.

The median age in the city was 28.2 years. 37.7% of residents were under the age of 18; 7% were between the ages of 18 and 24; 25.6% were from 25 to 44; 18.7% were from 45 to 64; and 11.1% were 65 years of age or older. The gender makeup of the city was 49.8% male and 50.2% female.

=== 2000 census ===
As of the census of 2000, there were 319 people, 96 households, and 74 families residing in the city. The population density was 901.8 inhabitants per square mile (348.2/km^{2}). There were 101 housing units at an average density of 285.5 per square mile (110.2/km^{2}). The racial makeup of the city was 97.49% White, 1.88% from other races, and 0.63% from two or more races. Hispanic or Latino of any race were 2.19% of the population.

There were 96 households, out of which 50.0% had children under the age of 18 living with them, 67.7% were married couples living together, 5.2% had a female householder with no husband present, and 22.9% were non-families. 22.9% of all households were made up of individuals, and 13.5% had someone living alone who was 65 years of age or older. The average household size was 3.32 and the average family size was 3.99.

In the city, the population was spread out, with 41.4% under the age of 18, 9.4% from 18 to 24, 26.3% from 25 to 44, 12.5% from 45 to 64, and 10.3% who were 65 years of age or older. The median age was 24 years. For every 100 females, there were 98.1 males. For every 100 females age 18 and over, there were 83.3 males.

The median income for a household in the city was $28,750, and the median income for a family was $34,444. Males had a median income of $30,000 versus $16,250 for females. The per capita income for the city was $9,265. About 13.2% of families and 16.1% of the population were below the poverty line, including 14.6% of those under age 18 and 22.5% of those age 65 or over.

== Education ==
It is located in the Fremont County Joint School District 215.

College of Eastern Idaho includes this county in its catchment zone; however this county is not in its taxation zone.

== See also ==
- List of cities in Idaho
