= Squirrel, Idaho =

Unincorporated community in the state of Idaho, United States

- Unincorporated community
- Interactive map of Squirrel, Idaho
- Coordinates: 44°01′38″N 111°17′57″W
- Country: United States
- State: Idaho
- County: Fremont County
- Elevation: 5,617 ft (1,712 m)
- Time zone: Mountain (MST)
- GNIS feature ID: 398176

Squirrel is an unincorporated community in Fremont County, Idaho, United States. The area lies north of Idaho State Route 32 northeast of Drummond and southeast of Ashton.
