= Bill Hillman =

Bill Hillman may refer to:

- William Byron Hillman, American film director, film producer, screenwriter and actor
- Bill Hillman (radio broadcaster), American broadcaster, union leader, and television news anchor

== See also ==
- Bill Hillmann, American author, storyteller, and journalist
