= South Fremont High School =

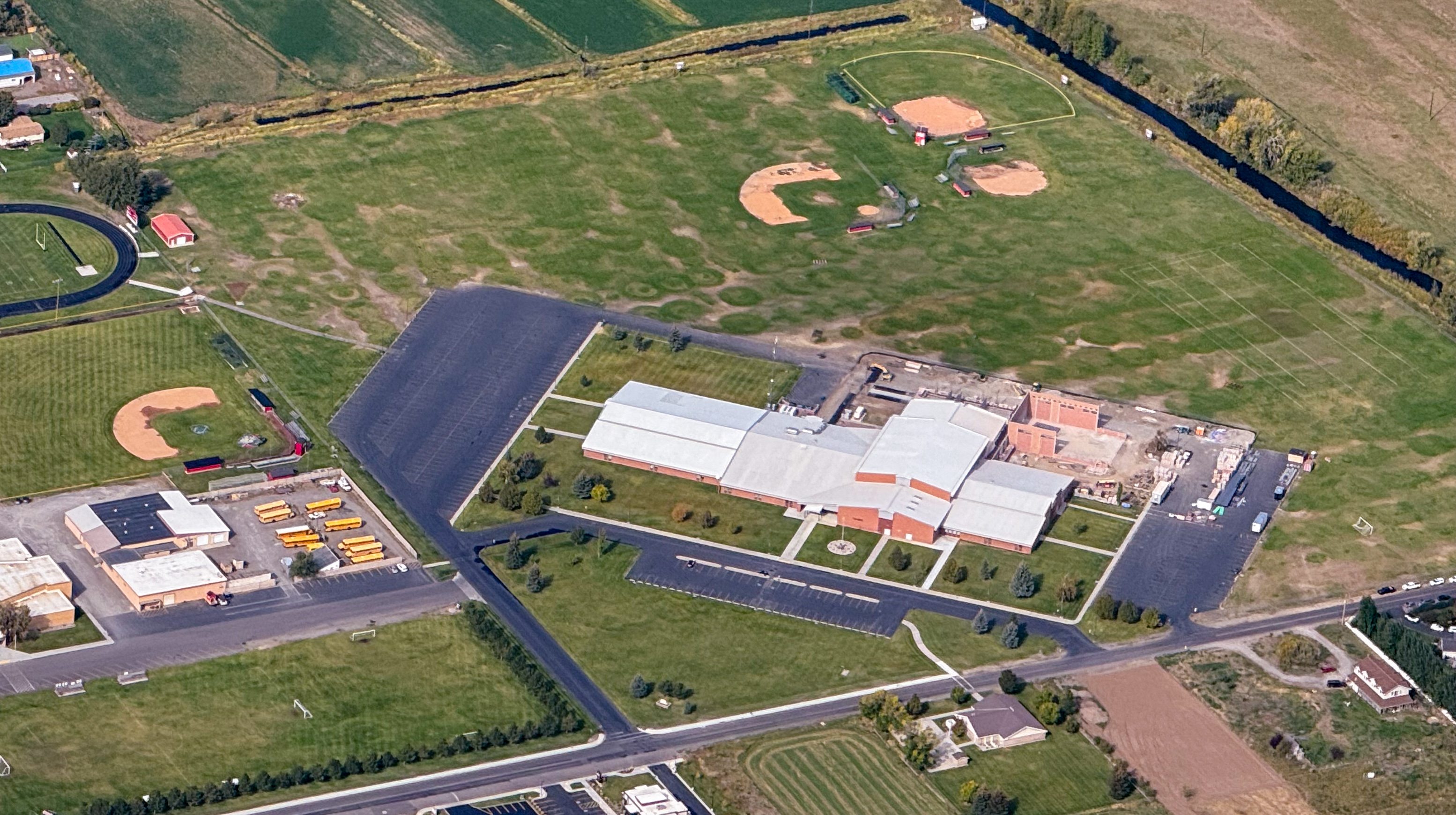
- Aerial photo of high school

Location
- 855 N. Bridge St. St. Anthony, Idaho; United States; 43.975°N 111.684°W

Information
- Type: Public
- School district: Fremont S.D. (#215)
- Principal: Larry Bennett
- Teaching staff: 25.52 (FTE)
- Grades: 9–12
- Enrollment: 455 (2023-2024)
- Student to teacher ratio: 17.83
- Colors: Red & Black
- Athletics conference: IHSAA Class 3A
- Mascot: Cougar
- Rival: Sugar-Salem
- Yearbook: Tattler
- Elevation: 4,970 ft (1,510 m) AMSL
- Website: www.sfhscougars.net/o/sfhs

South Fremont High School is a four-year public secondary school in St. Anthony, Idaho, United States. It is one of two high schools in the Fremont Joint School District #215, the other being North Fremont High School located in nearby Ashton. The school colors are red and black and the mascot is a cougar. They are classified as a 3A school. The school excels in many programs, including athletics and music.

== Controversies ==
In 1992, the school caught the attention of the American Civil Liberties Union for displaying a nativity scene in a school hallway. The scene contained two-inch tall figures which were arranged by the school's student council. The ACLU argued that the display was a violation of the First Amendment to the United States Constitution, which guarantees separation of church and state.

The school also received criticism in 1998 for holding its graduation ceremonies at Ricks College, which is run by the Church of Jesus Christ of Latter-day Saints. A school board member claimed that the ceremony would be uncomfortable for students who were not Mormons. The ACLU had fought with the school district in the 1980s to move its high school graduation from a LDS church building to a public school.

== Athletics ==
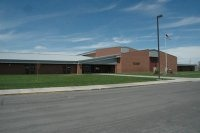
South Fremont High School front doors

South Fremont competes in athletics in IHSAA Class 3A, and is a member of the Mountain Rivers Conference. Other schools in this conference include rival Sugar-Salem High School and Teton High School.

The school’s sports teams include football, volleyball, soccer, basketball, wrestling, baseball, softball, speed golf, and track and field.

=== State titles ===
- Wrestling (5): (A-2, now 3A) 1985, 2020,2021,2022,2023 (introduced in 1958)

Baseball: 1991 A-2, now 3A; 3A 2004

Boys Basketball: 2014-15 State 3A Boys Basketball Champions

== Notable alumni ==
- Jason Buck, former NFL defensive lineman for the Cincinnati Bengals and Washington Redskins, first-round 17th overall pick in 1987 NFL draft by Cincinnati Bengals, winner of Outland Trophy in 1986 at BYU.
- Brandon Bair, defensive lineman for the Oregon Ducks, Kansas City Chiefs, Oakland Raiders, and Philadelphia Eagles.
- Gregory W. Moeller, American lawyer and judge, who is an associate justice of the Idaho Supreme Court.
