= Brandon Bair =

American football player (born 1984)

No. 75, 93
- Position: Defensive end

Personal information
- Born: November 24, 1984 (age 41); Rexburg, Idaho, U.S.
- Listed height: 6 ft 6 in (1.98 m)
- Listed weight: 290 lb (132 kg)

Career information
- High school: South Fremont (St. Anthony, Idaho)
- College: Oregon
- NFL draft: 2011: undrafted

Career history
- Kansas City Chiefs (2011); Oakland Raiders (2012); Philadelphia Eagles (2013–2015)

Awards and highlights
- Second-team All-Pac-10 (2010)

Career NFL statistics
- Total tackles: 28
- Sacks: 1.5
- Pass deflections: 4
- Stats at Pro Football Reference

Brandon Jake Bair (born November 24, 1984) is an American former professional football player who was a defensive end in the National Football League (NFL). He played college football for the Oregon Ducks. Bair was first signed by the Kansas City Chiefs as an undrafted free agent in 2011. He later played for the Oakland Raiders and the Philadelphia Eagles before retiring after five years in the NFL.

== Early life ==
Brandon Jake Bair was born on November 24, 1984, in Rexburg, Idaho. He attended South Fremont High School in St. Anthony, Idaho.

== College career ==
Bair played for the Ducks at the University of Oregon from 2007 to 2010. He was a backup his first two seasons and a starter for the final two. He finished his college career with totals of 106 tackles, five sacks, 12 pass breakups, one forced fumble, and one fumble recovery.

== Professional career ==
Pre-draft measurables
Height	Weight	Arm length	Hand span	40-yard dash	10-yard split	20-yard split	20-yard shuttle	Three-cone drill	Vertical jump	Broad jump	Bench press
6 ft 5 7/8 in (1.98 m)	276 lb (125 kg)	33 in (0.84 m)	10 3/8 in (0.26 m)	4.92 s	1.75 s	2.77 s	4.37 s	7.07 s	28.0 in (0.71 m)	9 ft 6 in (2.90 m)	26 reps
All values from NFL Combine

== Career statistics ==
=== NFL ===
Legend
**Bold**	Career high

Year	Team	Games		Tackles					Fumbles				Interceptions						Other
Year	Team	GP	GS	Comb	Solo	Ast	Sack	TFL	FF	FR	Yds	TD	Int	Yds	Avg	Lng	TD	PD	QBHits
2011	KC	—	—	—	—	—	—	—	—	—	—	—	—	—	—	—	—	—	—
2012	OAK	—	—	—	—	—	—	—	—	—	—	—	—	—	—	—	—	—	—
2014	PHI	16	0	**17**	**14**	3	**1.5**	**3**	—	—	—	—	—	—	—	—	—	1	**2**
2015	PHI	5	2	11	6	**5**	—	—	—	—	—	—	—	—	—	—	—	**3**	—
Career		21	2	28	20	8	1.5	3										4	2

=== College ===
Oregon Ducks statistics
Year	Team	Class	Position	GP	Tackles					Interceptions					Fumbles			
Year	Team	Class	Position	GP	Solo	Ast	Total	Loss	Sack	Int	Yards	Avg	TD	PD	FR	Yards	TD	FF
2007	Oregon	Freshman	DT	13	5	1	6	1.0	—	—	—	—	—	1	—	—	—	—
2008	Oregon	Sophomore	DT	13	5	3	8	—	—	—	—	—	—	1	1	24	—	1
2009	Oregon	Junior	DT	13	21	24	45	8.5	2.0	—	—	—	—	2	—	—	—	—
2010	Oregon	Senior	DT	13	25	22	47	16.0	3.0	—	—	—	—	8	—	—	—	—
Career				52	56	50	106	25.5	5.0					12	1	24		1

== Personal life ==
His younger brother, Stetzon Bair, played football for the University of Oregon. He currently lives in St. Anthony, Idaho with his wife and four daughters and is the general manager of Henry's Fork Homes. He often hosts football camps for kids and teens.

On May 6, 2021, he rescued a man from a burning semi-truck after it was struck by a train in St. Anthony, Idaho. For those actions, he received a Carnegie Medal.

Bair is a member of the Church of Jesus Christ of Latter-day Saints.
