= Jason Buck =

American football player (born 1963)

No. 99, 70
- Position: Defensive lineman

Personal information
- Born: July 27, 1963 (age 63); Moses Lake, Washington, U.S.
- Listed height: 6 ft 5 in (1.96 m)
- Listed weight: 264 lb (120 kg)

Career information
- High school: South Fremont (St. Anthony, Idaho)
- College: Ricks College (1983–1984) and Brigham Young Univ. (1985–1986)
- NFL draft: 1987: 1st round, 17th overall pick

Career history
- Cincinnati Bengals (1987–1990); Washington Redskins (1991–1993); Scottish Claymores (1996)

Awards and highlights
- Super Bowl champion (XXVI); National champion (1984); Outland Trophy (1986); Consensus All-American (1986); Third-team All-American (1985); WAC Defensive Player of the Year (1985)

Career NFL statistics
- Sacks: 19
- Fumble recoveries: 1
- Stats at Pro Football Reference

Jason Ogden Buck (born July 27, 1963) is an American former professional football player who was a defensive lineman in the National Football League (NFL).

== Football career ==
Buck was born in Moses Lake, Washington and played high school football for South Fremont High School in St. Anthony, Idaho.

He played collegiately at Brigham Young University, earning third-team All-American honors as a junior. He was a consensus All-American as a senior, and was awarded the Outland Trophy as the nation's best interior lineman.

Pre-draft measurables
Height	Weight	Arm length	Hand span	Bench press
6 ft 5 in (1.96 m)	250 lb (113 kg)	32 3/4 in (0.83 m)	9 1/4 in (0.23 m)	19 reps
All values from NFL Combine

Buck was selected in the first round of the 1987 NFL draft by the Cincinnati Bengals, the 17th overall pick. He recorded six sacks in the 1988 season as well as in the 1989 season. After four seasons with the Bengals, Buck moved to the Washington Redskins in 1991. He did earn a Super Bowl ring in the team's 37–24 victory over the Buffalo Bills in Super Bowl XXVI. He retired as a player following the 1993 season.

== Other ventures ==
Buck was a co-owner of the Utah Blaze of the Arena Football League, based in Salt Lake City, Utah and is also a public speaker. He sought the Republican nomination for the 2nd District in the United States House of Representatives elections in Utah, 2012 but was defeated at the State Convention.

== Personal life ==
Buck is a member of the Church of Jesus Christ of Latter-day Saints and he loves to work on his family history at the Church History Library. He has two sons, Tyson and Josh. Tyson played linebacker for the University of Utah Utes football team in 2009–2010. Josh played long snapper for the Dixie State Red Storm in 2015.
