= Rexburg micropolitan area =

Rexburg, Idaho Micropolitan Area
- Micropolitan Statistical Area
- Rexburg, ID Micropolitan Statistical Area
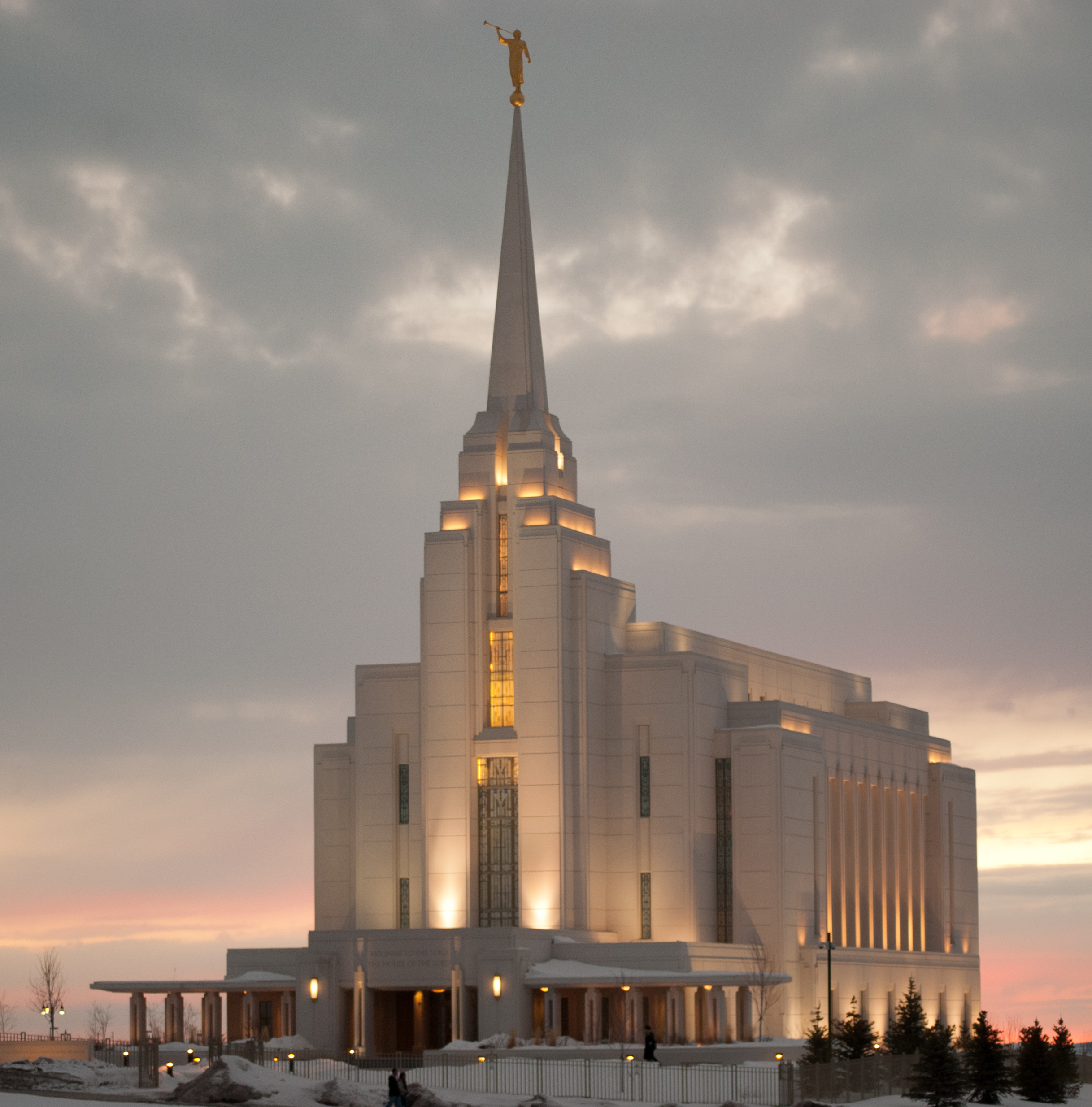
- Rexburg Idaho Temple at sunset
Interactive Map of Idaho Falls–Rexburg–
Blackfoot, ID CSA
City of Idaho Falls
Idaho Falls, ID MSA
City of Rexburg
Rexburg, ID µSA
Blackfoot, ID µSA
- Country: United States
- State: Idaho
- Largest City: Idaho Falls
- Other Cities: Ammon; Rexburg; Blackfoot
- Time zone: UTC-7 (MST)
  - Summer (DST): UTC-6 (MDT)

The Rexburg Micropolitan Statistical Area, as defined by the United States Census Bureau, is an area consisting of two counties in eastern Idaho, anchored by the city of Rexburg.

As of the 2000 census, the μSA had a population of 39,286 (though a July 1, 2007 estimate placed the population at 49,164).

== Counties ==
- Fremont
- Madison

== Communities ==
- Rexburg (Principal City)
- Ashton
- Drummond
- Island Park
- Lake (unincorporated)
- Newdale
- Parker
- St. Anthony
- Sugar City
- Teton
- Warm River

== Demographics ==
As of the census of 2000, there were 39,286 people, 11,014 households, and 7,884 families residing within the μSA. The racial makeup of the μSA was 94.27% White, 0.21% African American, 0.38% Native American, 0.51% Asian, 0.15% Pacific Islander, 3.35% from other races, and 1.14% from two or more races. Hispanic or Latino of any race were 5.94% of the population.

The median income for a household in the μSA was $33,016, and the median income for a family was $38,798. Males had a median income of $27,895 versus $19,149 for females. The per capita income for the μSA was $12,461.

== See also ==
- Idaho census statistical areas
