= Teton, Idaho =

- City
- Location of Teton in Fremont County, Idaho.
- Coordinates: 43°53′14″N 111°40′21″W
- Country: United States
- State: Idaho
- County: Fremont

Area
  - Total: 0.69 sq mi (1.79 km^{2})
  - Land: 0.69 sq mi (1.79 km^{2})
  - Water: 0 sq mi (0.00 km^{2})
- Elevation: 4,948 ft (1,508 m)

Population (2020)
  - Total: 787
  - Density: 1,140/sq mi (440/km^{2})
- Time zone: UTC-7 (Mountain (MST))
  - Summer (DST): UTC-6 (MDT)
- ZIP code: 83451
- Area code: 208
- FIPS code: 16-80380
- GNIS feature ID: 2412052
- Website: www.cityofteton.com

Teton is a city in Fremont County, Idaho, United States. The population was 787 at the 2020 census. It is part of the Rexburg, Idaho Micropolitan Statistical Area.

== Geography ==
According to the United States Census Bureau, the city has a total area of 0.68 square miles (1.76 km^{2}), all of it land.

== Demographics ==
Historical population
Census	Pop.	Note	%±
1920	537		—
1930	481		−10.4%
1940	514		6.9%
1950	463		−9.9%
1960	399		−13.8%
1970	390		−2.3%
1980	559		43.3%
1990	570		2.0%
2000	569		−0.2%
2010	735		29.2%
2020	787		7.1%
U.S. Decennial Census

=== 2010 census ===
As of the census of 2010, there were 735 people, 251 households, and 201 families living in the city. The population density was 1,080.9 inhabitants per square mile (417.3/km^{2}). There were 268 housing units at an average density of 394.1 per square mile (152.2/km^{2}). The racial makeup of the city was 79.6% White, 0.7% African American, 0.7% Native American, 0.3% Asian, 0.1% Pacific Islander, 16.9% from other races, and 1.8% from two or more races. Hispanic or Latino of any race were 22.2% of the population.

There were 251 households, of which 40.6% had children under the age of 18 living with them, 66.5% were married couples living together, 9.6% had a female householder with no husband present, 4.0% had a male householder with no wife present, and 19.9% were non-families. 17.5% of all households were made up of individuals, and 9.2% had someone living alone who was 65 years of age or older. The average household size was 2.93 and the average family size was 3.31.

The median age in the city was 30.5 years. 32.4% of residents were under the age of 18; 8.3% were between the ages of 18 and 24; 25.3% were from 25 to 44; 22.2% were from 45 to 64; and 11.8% were 65 years of age or older. The gender makeup of the city was 49.4% male and 50.6% female.

=== 2000 census ===
As of the census of 2000, there were 569 people, 192 households, and 144 families living in the city. The population density was 1,212.0 inhabitants per square mile (468.0/km^{2}). There were 211 housing units at an average density of 449.5 per square mile (173.6/km^{2}). The racial makeup of the city was 90.69% White, 0.18% African American, 0.35% Native American, 0.18% Asian, 7.03% from other races, and 1.58% from two or more races. Hispanic or Latino of any race were 14.76% of the population.

There were 192 households, out of which 38.0% had children under the age of 18 living with them, 65.1% were married couples living together, 8.3% had a female householder with no husband present, and 24.5% were non-families. 20.8% of all households were made up of individuals, and 9.9% had someone living alone who was 65 years of age or older. The average household size was 2.96 and the average family size was 3.50.

In the city, the population was spread out, with 31.1% under the age of 18, 10.7% from 18 to 24, 26.9% from 25 to 44, 18.8% from 45 to 64, and 12.5% who were 65 years of age or older. The median age was 32 years. For every 100 females, there were 94.2 males. For every 100 females age 18 and over, there were 98.0 males.

The median income for a household in the city was $33,409, and the median income for a family was $35,278. Males had a median income of $25,147 versus $19,583 for females. The per capita income for the city was $12,186. About 17.2% of families and 20.8% of the population were below the poverty line, including 25.0% of those under age 18 and 12.5% of those age 65 or over.

== Education ==
It is located in the Fremont County Joint School District 215. Teton Elementary School is in Teton.

College of Eastern Idaho includes this county in its catchment zone; however this county is not in its taxation zone.
