= Sugar-Salem High School =

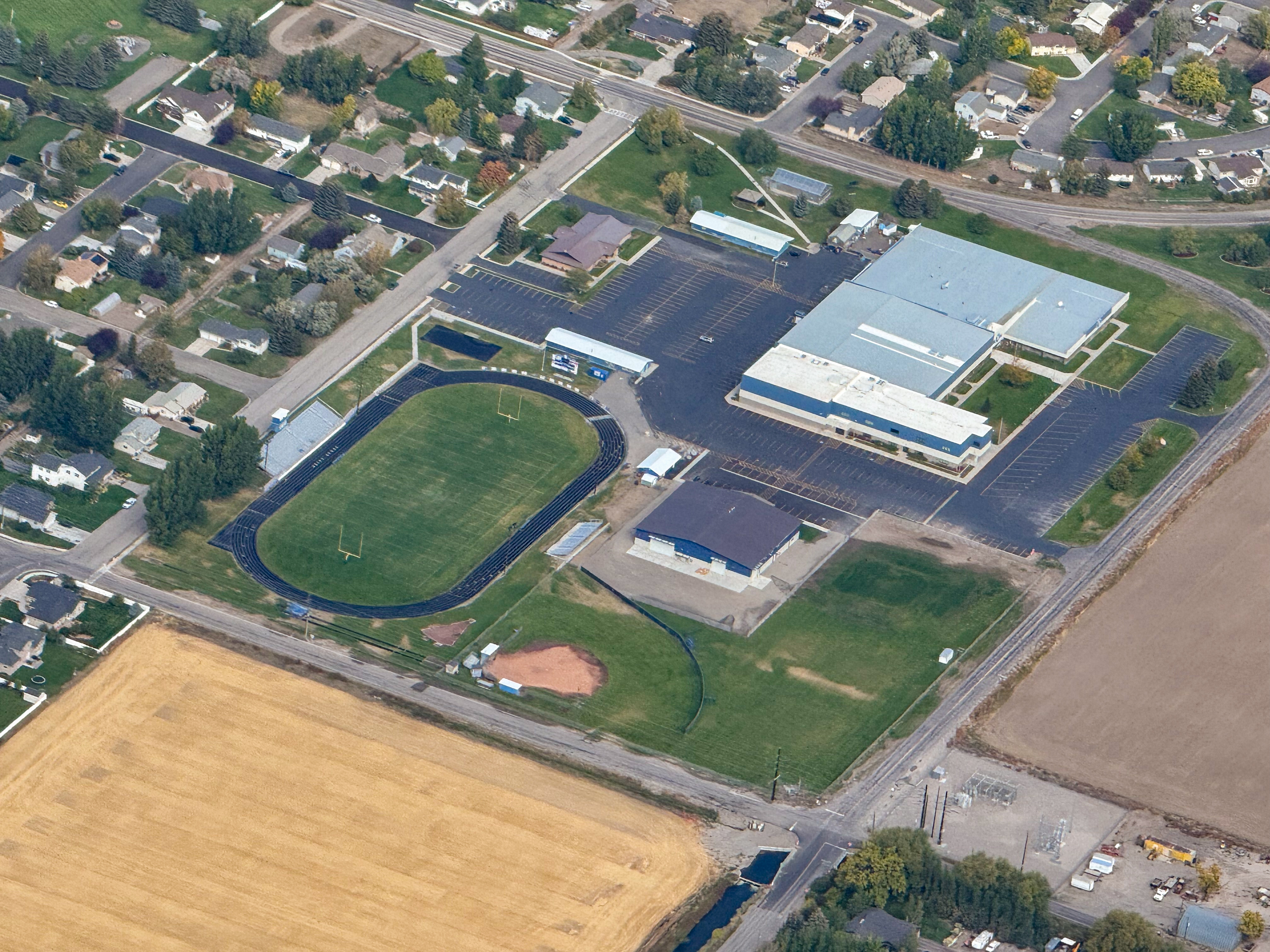
- Aerial view of high school

Location
- 1 Digger Drive; Sugar City, Idaho; United States; 43°52′19″N 111°44′21″W

Information
- Type: Public high school
- School district: Sugar-Salem School District (#322)
- Principal: Jared Jenks
- Teaching staff: 27.74 (FTE)
- Grades: 9–12
- Enrollment: 584 (2024–2025)
- Student to teacher ratio: 21.05
- Colors: Royal blue & white
- Athletics: IHSAA Class 3A
- Athletics conference: Mountain Rivers
- Mascot: Digger
- Rival: South Fremont
- Yearbook: Blue & White
- Feeder schools: Sugar-Salem Junior High
- Website: hs.sugarsalem.org

Sugar-Salem High School is a four-year public secondary school in Sugar City, Idaho, the only traditional high school of the Sugar-Salem Joint School District #322 in Madison County. The school colors are royal blue and white and the mascot is a digger, a reference to sugar beet cultivation.

The school district (of which this is the sole comprehensive high school) includes Sugar City, Newdale, and a portion a small portion of Rexburg.

== History ==
Sugar-Salem High School was built in 1989. The high school was previously housed in what is now Valley View Alternative High School.

== Academic Awards ==
Sugar-Salem High School has received academic awards including a bronze medal on the U.S. News & World Report List of America’s Best High Schools in 2008 and was listed as a top school in Redbook Magazine in 1994. Sugar Salem High School has a graduation rate of 97 percent. In 2013, it became a National Blue Ribbon School.

== Athletics ==
Sugar-Salem competes in athletics in IHSAA Class 3A and is a member of the Mountain Rivers Conference. It has received many sportsmanship awards in boys’ and girls’ basketball, volleyball, cross country, wrestling, track & field, and soccer. As of December 2024, the school has won a total of 105 IHSAA state championships including an astonishing 52 state titles from 2017 to 2024. For three consecutive years, in 2018, 2019 and 2020, Sugar-Salem High School was awarded the MaxPreps Cup, a title given by MaxPreps.com to the best overall high school sports program in each state. The tremendous success of Sugar-Salem’s academic and extracurricular programs has earned Sugar City the nickname “Title-town”.

Paul Lambert of the Rexburg Standard Journal wrote in 2026 that, in a figure of speech to demonstrate the school's overall strength in athletics, the trophy case of Sugar-Salem "has its own zip code."

=== State titles ===
Boys

- Baseball (1): (3A) 2024
- Football (6): fall 2018, 2019, 2020, 2022, 2023, 2024
- Cross Country (8): fall (3A) 2009, 2015, 2016, 2017, 2018, 2019, 2020, 2021, 2024 (introduced in 1964)
- Soccer (3):fall 2021, 2022 (introduced in 2000) 2023
- Basketball (8): (AA, now 3A) 1962; (A-3, now 2A) 1973; (A-2, now 3A) 1993, 1994, (3A) 2017, 2019, 2020, 2023
- Wrestling (12): (A-3, now 2A) 1984, 1986, 1991; (A-2, now 3A) 1992, 1993, 1996, 1997, 2000; (3A) 2002, 2003, 2017, 2018, 2019 (introduced in 1958)
- Track (8): (3A)2013, 2014, 2015, 2017, 2018, 2019, 2022, 2023

Girls

- Cross Country (8): fall (3A) 2012, 2013, 2017, 2018, 2019, 2020, 2022, 2024 (introduced in 1974)
- Soccer (2): 2023, 2024 fall (introduced in 2000)
- Volleyball (10): fall (A-3, now 2A) 1990; (3A) 2003, 2006, 2007, 2008, 2016, 2017, 2019, 2020, 2021 (introduced in 1976)
- Basketball (8): (A-3, now 2A) 1991; (3A) 2007, 2009, 2011, 2015, 2018, 2019, 2022(introduced in 1976)
- Track (11): (A-3, now 2A) 1983, 1985, 1986; (3A) 2007, 2008, 2010, 2012, 2013, 2014, 2017, 2021 (introduced in 1971)

Combined

- Cheer (10): (3A) 2008, 2012, 2013, 2014, 2015, 2018, 2021, 2022, 2023, 2024
- Drama (12): (3A) 2003, 2004, 2005, 2006, 2007, 2008, 2009, 2010, 2015, 2016, 2017, 2018

== Notable alumni ==
- Harold G. Hillam - Emeritus General Authority of the Church of Jesus Christ of Latter-day Saints, former member of the Presidency of the Seventy
- Mack Shirley, Idaho State Representative
- Laurel Thatcher Ulrich, Pulitzer-prize winning author of A Midwife's Tale

== See also ==
- List of high schools in Idaho
