= KRXK =

- Rexburg, Idaho; United States
- Broadcast area: Idaho Falls/Rexburg
- Frequency: 1230 kHz

Programming
- Format: Silent

Ownership
- Owner: Pacific Empire Radio Corporation
- Sister stations: KSEI AM

History
- First air date: 1951

Technical information
- Licensing authority: FCC
- Facility ID: 12664
- Class: C
- Power: 1,000 watts unlimited
- Transmitter coordinates: 43°50′50″N 111°47′3″W

Links
- Public license information: Public file; LMS

KRXK (1230 AM) is a radio station licensed to Rexburg, Idaho, United States. The station serves the Idaho Falls/Rexburg area. The station is owned by Pacific Empire Radio Corporation. Currently KRXK streams alternative rock online through Radio Pandemic. This seems to be a defunct online radio station since nothing on the Radio Pandemic website seems to work.

Before moving to being solely an online station, KRXK served as a sister station to KSEI and carried sports programming. KRXK rotated the sports network it was with. KRXK served as an affiliate for Sporting News Radio and ESPN Radio, but also carried some programming from Fox Sports Radio and Sports Byline USA. They were the home to the Madison Bobcats High school sports broadcasts and the Idaho State Bengals football and men's and women's basketball broadcasts. They also served as an affiliate for the Seattle Seahawks and the NFL on Sports USA Radio Network. On October 6, 2011, the AM feed of KRXK went silent and moved solely to an online streaming station.
