= Fremont County Joint School District 215 =

School district in Idaho, United States

Fremont County Joint School District 215 is a school district headquartered in St. Anthony, Idaho.

The district covers the vast majority of Fremont County, and it covers all municipalities there except for Newdale, which is instead in the Sugar-Salem Joint School District 322. The Fremont County district extends into Madison County.

== History ==
Byron Stutzman became the superintendent in 2016.

Brandon Farris was scheduled to become the superintendent effective July 1, 2024. Farris originated from Buffalo, Wyoming. He replaced a different individual who was in an interim capacity.

== Schools ==
Secondary schools

- North Fremont Junior High/High School - Ashton
- South Fremont High School - St. Anthony
- South Fremont Junior High School - St. Anthony

Elementary schools

Pre-Kidnergarten to Grade 5:

- Ashton Elementary School
- Henry's Fork Elementary School - St. Anthony
- Parker-Egin Elementary School - St. Anthony
- Teton Elementary School - Teton
