= Bill Hillman (radio broadcaster) =

American broadcaster and union leader

- Born: William D. Hillman; December 10, 1922; Rexburg, Idaho, U.S.
- Died: August 3, 1999 (aged 76); Marin County, California, U.S.
- Occupations: Broadcaster, union leader, cryptanalyst
- Organization: AFTRA
- Known for: AFTRA leadership, broadcasting
- Spouse: Karla Hillman
- Children: 3
- Awards: George Heller Memorial Gold Card, National Academy of Television Arts & Sciences Silver Circle

Clarence W. "Bill" Hillman (December 10, 1922 – August 3, 1999) was an American broadcaster, union leader, cryptanalyst, and television news anchor. Over a career spanning five decades, Hillman made notable contributions to the entertainment and broadcasting industries, serving as the national president of the American Federation of Television and Radio Artists (AFTRA) from 1979 to 1984 and as a news broadcaster for KPIX-TV in San Francisco from 1953 to 1992. His work was distinguished by his leadership in union advocacy, scientific and cultural reporting, and his service as a cryptanalyst during World War II.

Hillman died on August 3, 1999. His passing was noted as a significant loss in the entertainment industry.

== Early Life and Military Service ==
Bill Hillman was born in Rexburg, Idaho on December 10, 1922. He began his broadcasting career at KIDO in Boise, Idaho, in 1942.

During World War II, Hillman served as a first lieutenant in the U.S. Army Signal Corps, where he worked as a cryptanalyst assigned to Signal Intelligence. His role involved intercepting and decoding enemy communications, contributing to the Allied intelligence efforts during the war.

== Broadcasting career ==
After the war, Hillman moved to the Bay Area in California, where he worked at several radio and television stations in Oakland, Vallejo, and San Francisco. In 1953, he joined the staff of KPIX-TV in San Francisco as an announcer and later became a news broadcaster, covering science and cultural affairs. Hillman’s reports earned him a reputation for journalistic excellence and professionalism. He remained with KPIX-TV until his retirement in 1992. After retirement he remained dedicated to preserving the history of Bay Area broadcasting.

Between 1957 and 1973, Hillman served as the Northern California correspondent for the United States Information Agency (USIA). His reports were broadcast worldwide through the Voice of America, helping inform international audiences on American news and culture.

== AFTRA Leadership and Union Advocacy ==
Hillman became a member of AFTRA in 1948 and quickly rose through the ranks of the organization. He held every elected position in the union’s San Francisco local, including four terms as president, before serving on the national board for more than 30 years. From 1979 to 1984, Hillman served as national president of AFTRA. During his presidency, the organization grew from 41,000 to over 66,000 members, reflecting his leadership in advocating for performers’ rights and expanding membership. He also played a crucial role in the development of AFTRA’s health and retirement funds, helping create one of the most progressive employee benefit systems in the broadcasting and entertainment industry. Hillman remained a trustee of the health and retirement funds from 1979 until his death.

In July 1980, shortly after Hillman assumed the presidency, AFTRA and the Screen Actors Guild (SAG) jointly entered a major TV/Theatrical strike that would last until September 25 of the same year. The strike centered on issues including wage increases, profit participation for performers in Pay-TV, videocassettes, and videodiscs, and pension and health benefits. Although a tentative agreement was eventually reached and ratified on October 23, 1980, the strike was viewed as largely disappointing for performers. The outcome reignited enthusiasm for merging the two unions and led to the creation of a formal merger plan in 1981. After meeting with AFTRA’s Conference of Locals in February 1981, Hillman optimistically stated, "This is not the first time that discussions have begun on merging AFTRA and SAG. Many of us hope that it is the last time... because for the first time, the climate exists where such discussions can be fruitful." Despite Hillman’s efforts, the first vote for merger failed six months before his death in 1999, delaying the eventual merger until 2012. Hillman was widely regarded as the "voice of reason" within AFTRA, known for his ability to diffuse tensions and harmonize divergent viewpoints. In 1997, he resigned from the National Board, explaining that the union should be led by actively working members with firsthand knowledge of current industry conditions.

During Bill Hillman’s tenure as AFTRA’s national president, the union faced one of its most severe crises—a lawsuit filed by Tuesday Productions, a San Diego-based non-union jingle production company. The company brought antitrust charges against AFTRA for allegedly attempting to prevent it from hiring non-union performers. In 1981, a jury found AFTRA liable, awarding $12 million in damages (tripled to $36 million under antitrust law), which forced AFTRA to declare Chapter 11 bankruptcy in 1982.

During Hillman’s tenure as AFTRA Health and Retirement Fund trustee, he played a key role in implementing some of the most progressive benefits in the entertainment industry. This included health coverage for same-sex domestic partners, the elimination of annual limits for mental health medications, and coverage for birth control pills. Hillman described these changes as a “series of the most important improvements ever made in the retirement plan,” ensuring long-term security for participants.

Under Hillman’s leadership, the AFTRA Health and Retirement Funds reached significant milestones, with assets surpassing $1.5 billion for the retirement fund and $150 million for the health fund by the late 1990s. His dedication to improving benefits was seen as a key part of ensuring AFTRA participants’ long-term security.

== Awards and recognition ==
In 1984, Hillman received AFTRA’s highest honor, the George Heller Memorial Gold Card, in recognition of his distinguished service to the union and its members.

Hillman’s contributions to broadcasting and union leadership earned him widespread recognition. He was inducted into the National Academy of Television Arts & Sciences’ Silver Circle for his more than 25 years of service in television.

- Bill Hillman Television Archive, San Francisco State University

== Personal life ==
Hillman was married to Karla Hillman, with whom he had a son. After a divorce, he married his second wife, Apple Hillman, with whom he had two children. His family and personal experiences greatly influenced his work and dedication to labor rights and advocacy. Known for his mentorship and leadership, Hillman was committed to supporting the next generation of broadcasters.

Hillman was an avid pilot, holding a commercial pilot’s license, and often incorporated his passion for flying into his personal life. His daughter, Nancy Ann Hillman, recalled his adventurous spirit, noting that he eloped with her mother on New Year’s Eve in 1960, flying them to Reno in a blizzard.

== Death ==
Bill Hillman died on August 3, 1999, of congestive heart failure at Marin General Hospital in Marin County, California. He was 76 years old. No funeral services were held, but a memorial service took place on August 21, 1999, at Fort Mason in San Francisco. Contributions in his memory were made to the Bill Hillman Television Archive Fund at San Francisco State University.
