= Fremont County, Idaho =

County in Idaho, United States

- County
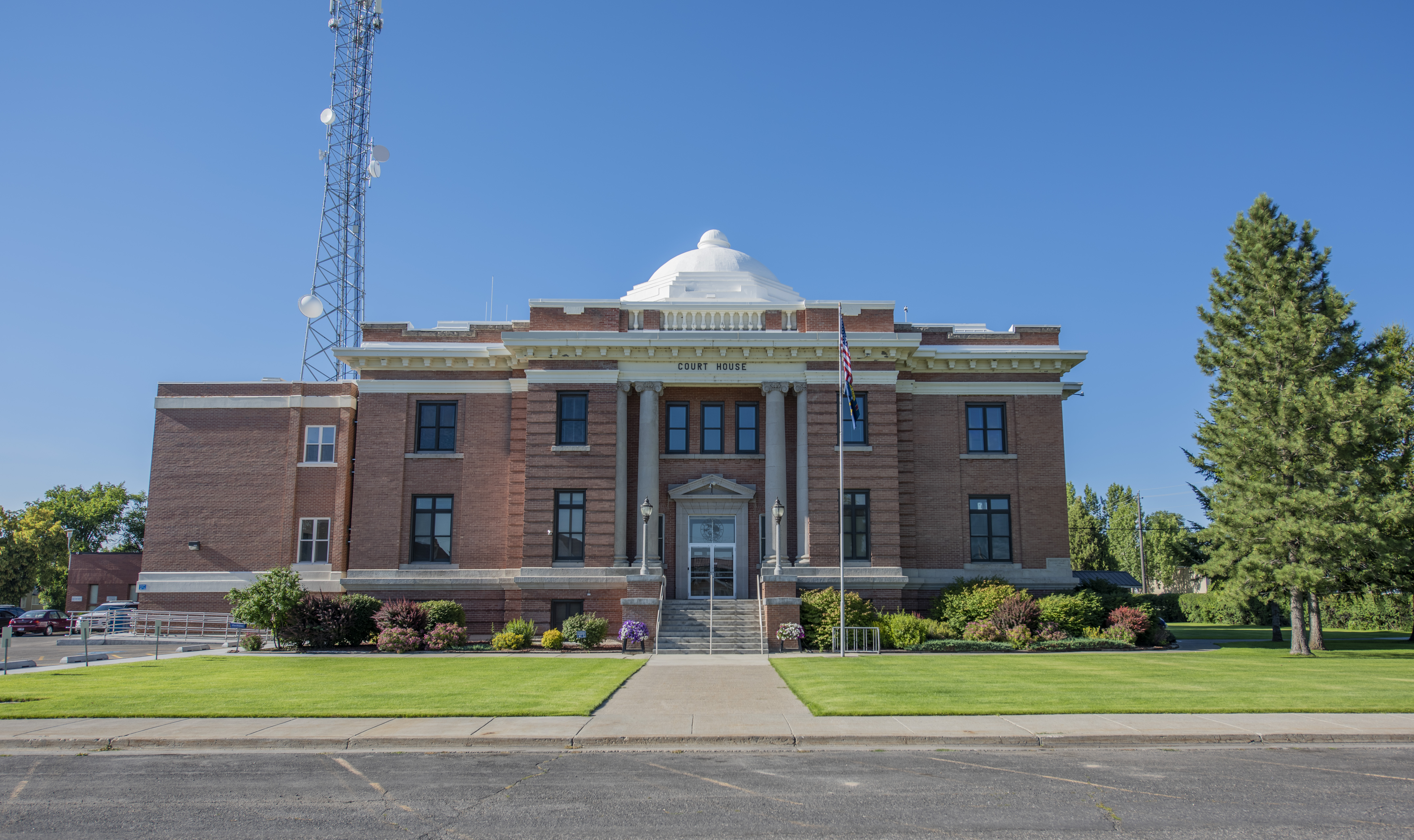
- Fremont County Courthouse

- Seal

- Location within the U.S. state of Idaho
- Coordinates: 44°13′N 111°29′W
- Country: United States
- State: Idaho
- Founded: March 4, 1893
- Named for: John C. Frémont
- Seat: St. Anthony
- Largest city: St. Anthony

Area
  - Total: 1,896 sq mi (4,910 km^{2})
  - Land: 1,864 sq mi (4,830 km^{2})
  - Water: 32 sq mi (83 km^{2}) 1.7%

Population (2020)
  - Total: 13,388
  - Estimate (2025): 14,208 ▲
  - Density: 7.182/sq mi (2.773/km^{2})
- Time zone: UTC−7 (Mountain)
  - Summer (DST): UTC−6 (MDT)
- Congressional district: 2nd
- Website: www.fremontcountyid.gov

Fremont County is a county located in the U.S. state of Idaho. As of the 2020 census the county had a population of 13,388. The county seat and largest city is St. Anthony. The county was established in 1893, and was named for the explorer John C. Frémont. Fremont County is part of the Rexburg, Idaho micropolitan area, which is also included in the Idaho Falls metropolitan area.

== History ==
Fremont County was established in 1893 when Bingham County was partitioned. It is named for John C. Frémont.

The county initially contained all of the northern portion of eastern Idaho north of Bonneville County. The counties of Jefferson and Madison were created from Fremont in 1913. Teton County was later created from Madison in 1915 and a portion of Butte was created from Jefferson in 1917. Clark County was also created from Fremont in 1919.

The first fur trapping operation by a United States fur company west of the Rocky Mountains occurred in 1810 when Andrew Henry established a fort in the fall of 1810 on Conant Creek in southern Fremont County. Henry later moved the fort to the south bank of the Henry's Fork of the Snake River between present-day settlements of Salem and Parker. The fort was abandoned some time after 1811.

At the time of early settlement, Fremont County was located on the northern edge of Oneida County. Mining, timber, and ranching operations commenced in the Island Park area prior to 1870. The establishment of Yellowstone National Park in 1872 also contributed to the eventual development of the Island Park area as a popular recreation area. Construction of the Egin Canal commenced in 1879 and farming settlement of the Egin area followed. In 1883, Parker was established and settlement commenced at Teton. These settlements became part of Bingham County when it was created in 1885. Settlement at St. Anthony started in 1888 while the Ashton area settlement of Marysville commenced settlement in 1889. At the 1890 Census, Bingham County enumerated 301 residents in the precincts of Teton and Henry's Lake.

Additional settlement occurred at Warm River in 1896, the Drummond area in 1900, and Newdale in 1914.

The Fremont County Courthouse in St. Anthony is on the National Register of Historic Places.

== Geography ==
According to the U.S. Census Bureau, the county has a total area of 1,896 square miles (4,910 km^{2}), of which 1,864 square miles (4,830 km^{2}) is land and 32 square miles (83 km^{2}) (1.7%) is water. The southern part of the county covers the northeastern tip of the Snake River Basin, with the mountains of the continental divide forming its northern boundary. Montana lies to the north, and Wyoming to the east. A portion of Yellowstone National Park reaches into the county.

=== Adjacent counties ===
- Clark County - west
- Jefferson County - southwest
- Madison County - south
- Teton County - south
- Teton County, Wyoming - east
- Gallatin County, Montana - north
- Madison County, Montana - north
- Beaverhead County, Montana - northwest

Fremont County is one of the few US counties to border two counties of the same name in different states. Fremont County borders two such pairs of counties-- Madison County, Idaho and Madison County, Montana and Teton County, Idaho and Teton County, Wyoming.

=== Major highways ===
- US 20
- SH-47
- SH-87

=== National protected areas ===
- Caribou-Targhee National Forest (part)
- Yellowstone National Park (part)

== Demographics ==
Historical population
Census	Pop.	Note	%±
1900	12,821		—
1910	24,606		91.9%
1920	10,380		−57.8%
1930	9,924		−4.4%
1940	10,304		3.8%
1950	9,351		−9.2%
1960	8,679		−7.2%
1970	8,710		0.4%
1980	10,813		24.1%
1990	10,937		1.1%
2000	11,819		8.1%
2010	13,242		12.0%
2020	13,388		1.1%
2025 (est.)	14,208	▲	6.1%
U.S. Decennial Census; 1790–1960, 1900–1990, 1990–2000, 2010–2020 2020

=== Racial and ethnic composition ===
Fremont County, Idaho – Racial and ethnic composition Note: the US Census treats Hispanic/Latino as an ethnic category. This table excludes Latinos from the racial categories and assigns them to a separate category. Hispanics/Latinos may be of any race.
Race / Ethnicity (NH = Non-Hispanic)	Pop 1980	Pop 1990	Pop 2000	Pop 2010	Pop 2020	% 1980	% 1990	% 2000	% 2010	% 2020
White alone (NH)	10,387	10,064	10,320	11,273	11,292	96.06%	92.02%	87.32%	85.13%	84.34%
Black or African American alone (NH)	2	8	15	24	21	0.02%	0.07%	0.13%	0.18%	0.16%
Native American or Alaska Native alone (NH)	116	65	55	86	68	1.07%	0.59%	0.47%	0.65%	0.51%
Asian alone (NH)	13	31	43	27	44	0.12%	0.28%	0.36%	0.20%	0.33%
Native Hawaiian or Pacific Islander alone (NH)	x	x	7	11	24	x	x	0.06%	0.08%	0.18%
Other race alone (NH)	0	7	8	9	34	0.00%	0.06%	0.07%	0.07%	0.25%
Mixed race or Multiracial (NH)	x	x	116	118	315	x	x	0.98%	0.89%	2.35%
Hispanic or Latino (any race)	295	762	1,255	1,694	1,590	2.73%	6.97%	10.62%	12.79%	11.88%
Total	10,813	10,937	11,819	13,242	13,388	100.00%	100.00%	100.00%	100.00%	100.00%

=== 2020 census ===
As of the 2020 census, the county had a population of 13,388. The median age was 37.7 years. 27.6% of residents were under the age of 18 and 18.1% of residents were 65 years of age or older. For every 100 females there were 107.3 males, and for every 100 females age 18 and over there were 108.7 males age 18 and over.

The racial makeup of the county was 86.4% White, 0.2% Black or African American, 0.7% American Indian and Alaska Native, 0.3% Asian, 0.2% Native Hawaiian and Pacific Islander, 7.3% from some other race, and 4.9% from two or more races. Hispanic or Latino residents of any race comprised 11.9% of the population.

0.0% of residents lived in urban areas, while 100.0% lived in rural areas.

There were 4,688 households in the county, of which 33.3% had children under the age of 18 living with them and 16.9% had a female householder with no spouse or partner present. About 21.4% of all households were made up of individuals and 10.1% had someone living alone who was 65 years of age or older.

There were 8,452 housing units, of which 44.5% were vacant. Among occupied housing units, 80.3% were owner-occupied and 19.7% were renter-occupied. The homeowner vacancy rate was 1.3% and the rental vacancy rate was 13.3%.

=== 2010 census ===
As of the 2010 United States census, there were 13,242 people, 4,436 households, and 3,436 families living in the county. The population density was 7.1 inhabitants per square mile (2.7/km^{2}). There were 8,531 housing units at an average density of 4.6 units per square mile (1.8 units/km^{2}). The racial makeup of the county was 89.5% white, 0.7% American Indian, 0.3% black or African American, 0.2% Asian, 0.1% Pacific islander, 7.6% from other races, and 1.5% from two or more races. Those of Hispanic or Latino origin made up 12.8% of the population. In terms of ancestry, 29.9% were English, 22.7% were German, 7.6% were Irish, 6.1% were American, 5.7% were Scottish, and 5.1% were Danish.

Of the 4,436 households, 38.7% had children under the age of 18 living with them, 65.9% were married couples living together, 7.2% had a female householder with no husband present, 22.5% were non-families, and 19.7% of all households were made up of individuals. The average household size was 2.88 and the average family size was 3.32. The median age was 33.5 years.

The median income for a household in the county was $42,523 and the median income for a family was $52,510. Males had a median income of $35,907 versus $24,450 for females. The per capita income for the county was $18,616. About 6.8% of families and 8.5% of the population were below the poverty line, including 9.3% of those under age 18 and 9.7% of those age 65 or over.

=== 2000 census ===
As of the census of 2000, there were 11,819 people, 3,885 households, and 3,030 families living in the county. The population density was 6 people per square mile (2.3 people/km^{2}). There were 6,890 housing units at an average density of 4 units per square mile (1.5 units/km^{2}). The racial makeup of the county was 91.41% White, 0.16% Black or African American, 0.51% Native American, 0.36% Asian, 0.06% Pacific Islander, 5.94% from other races, and 1.56% from two or more races. 10.62% of the population were Hispanic or Latino of any race. 25.1% were of English, 15.1% German and 14.8% American ancestry. Those citing "American" ancestry in Fremont County are of overwhelmingly English extraction, however most English Americans identify simply as having American ancestry because their roots have been in North America for so long, in some cases since the 1600s.

There were 3,885 households, out of which 39.50% had children under the age of 18 living with them, 67.90% were married couples living together, 6.90% had a female householder with no husband present, and 22.00% were non-families. 19.50% of all households were made up of individuals, and 8.50% had someone living alone who was 65 years of age or older. The average household size was 2.96 and the average family size was 3.43.

In the county, the population was spread out, with 33.10% under the age of 18, 9.30% from 18 to 24, 24.70% from 25 to 44, 20.40% from 45 to 64, and 12.40% who were 65 years of age or older. The median age was 32 years. For every 100 females, there were 105.80 males. For every 100 females age 18 and over, there were 105.80 males.

The median income for a household in the county was $33,424, and the median income for a family was $36,715. Males had a median income of $26,490 versus $19,670 for females. The per capita income for the county was $13,965. About 10.30% of families and 14.20% of the population were below the poverty line, including 18.40% of those under age 18 and 13.60% of those age 65 or over.

== Government and infrastructure ==
The Idaho Department of Correction operates the St. Anthony Work Camp in St. Anthony.

This rural healthcare system has several health clinics in the county with Madison Memorial as the nearest medical hospital with a trauma center for emergencies. Fremont consistently ranks above average for air quality scores.

Like almost all of Idaho, Fremont County is overwhelmingly Republican and has been since 1952, before which it oscillated in cycles between Democratic and Republican presidential candidates. Lyndon B. Johnson in 1964 was the last Democratic presidential candidate to carry the county, and even then by only 25 votes. To date, LBJ is the last Democrat to attain 40 percent of the county's vote, and no Democrat has won more than 30 percent of the county's vote since Jimmy Carter in 1976. In fact, third-party candidates outpolled the Democratic nominee in 1972, 1992 and 2016.

United States presidential election results for Fremont County, Idaho
Year	Republican		Democratic		Third party(ies)	
Year	No.	%	No.	%	No.	%
1896	121	7.31%	1,526	92.21%	8	0.48%
1900	2,174	50.24%	2,153	49.76%	0	0.00%
1904	3,869	70.58%	1,278	23.31%	335	6.11%
1908	3,920	54.44%	2,854	39.64%	426	5.92%
1912	3,071	44.70%	1,911	27.81%	1,889	27.49%
1916	1,654	36.35%	2,695	59.23%	201	4.42%
1920	1,994	65.27%	1,061	34.73%	0	0.00%
1924	1,662	45.30%	530	14.45%	1,477	40.26%
1928	1,674	46.26%	1,933	53.41%	12	0.33%
1932	1,498	34.60%	2,830	65.37%	1	0.02%
1936	1,423	32.59%	2,904	66.51%	39	0.89%
1940	1,996	43.83%	2,556	56.13%	2	0.04%
1944	1,755	45.34%	2,116	54.66%	0	0.00%
1948	1,777	46.63%	2,014	52.85%	20	0.52%
1952	2,710	64.32%	1,500	35.60%	3	0.07%
1956	2,513	62.08%	1,535	37.92%	0	0.00%
1960	2,230	54.17%	1,887	45.83%	0	0.00%
1964	1,945	49.68%	1,970	50.32%	0	0.00%
1968	2,297	58.52%	961	24.48%	667	16.99%
1972	2,621	61.38%	819	19.18%	830	19.44%
1976	2,581	61.94%	1,445	34.68%	141	3.38%
1980	4,167	79.33%	926	17.63%	160	3.05%
1984	4,006	82.55%	818	16.86%	29	0.60%
1988	3,401	73.11%	1,178	25.32%	73	1.57%
1992	2,333	47.09%	903	18.23%	1,718	34.68%
1996	3,042	62.92%	1,114	23.04%	679	14.04%
2000	4,242	83.37%	699	13.74%	147	2.89%
2004	4,965	86.06%	741	12.84%	63	1.09%
2008	4,700	79.92%	1,065	18.11%	116	1.97%
2012	4,907	84.57%	810	13.96%	85	1.47%
2016	4,090	71.57%	651	11.39%	974	17.04%
2020	5,548	82.55%	998	14.85%	175	2.60%
2024	5,645	82.61%	954	13.96%	234	3.42%

== Communities ==
=== Cities ===
- Ashton
- Drummond
- Island Park
- Newdale
- Parker
- St. Anthony
- Teton
- Warm River

=== Unincorporated communities ===
- Big Springs
- Chester
- Egin
- Lake
- Macks Inn
- Squirrel
- Wilford

== Education ==
School districts include:

- Fremont County Joint School District 215
- Sugar-Salem School District

College of Eastern Idaho includes this county in its catchment zone; however this county is not in its taxation zone.

== Notable people ==
- Brad Harris, television and movie actor
- Sherman P. Lloyd, Utah State Senator and Member of the United States House of Representatives from Utah

== See also ==
- National Register of Historic Places listings in Fremont County, Idaho
