= Sugar-Salem School District =

School district in Idaho, United States

Sugar-Salem Joint School District 322 is a school district headquartered in Sugar City, Idaho.

== History ==
The current junior high school facility opened in November 2021, and the grade alignment of the junior high changed to grades 6-8 from the previous 7-8. The new junior high school had a cost of $17,000,000. The district also moved the third grade to Kershaw from Central. In 2022, the district had 90 teachers and 1,650 students.

Chester Bradshaw was superintendent until he moved to become the superintendent of the Cassia County School District. In 2023, Jared Jenks became the superintendent. Prior to that, he was the principal of the high school.

== District boundary ==
Part of the district is in Madison County, where it includes Sugar City and a small portion of Rexburg. The district extends into Fremont County, where it includes Newdale.

The school district takes in students from the surrounding area, from the local non-census designated communities of Salem (mostly inside Madison County, but partially straddling Fremont County) and Plano on the west, to beyond the town of Newdale on the east. On the north, it borders Fremont County, following the Snake River tributary known as Henrys Fork. On the south, it borders Madison School District and the city of Rexburg.

== Schools ==
- Sugar-Salem High School
- Sugar-Salem Junior High School
  - It has 40,000 square feet (3,700 m^{2}) of area. There are 22 classrooms.
- Kershaw Intermediate School (grades 3-5)
- Central Elementary School (Kindergarten-Grade 2)
- Valley View Alternative High School
