= Rexburg, Idaho =

- City
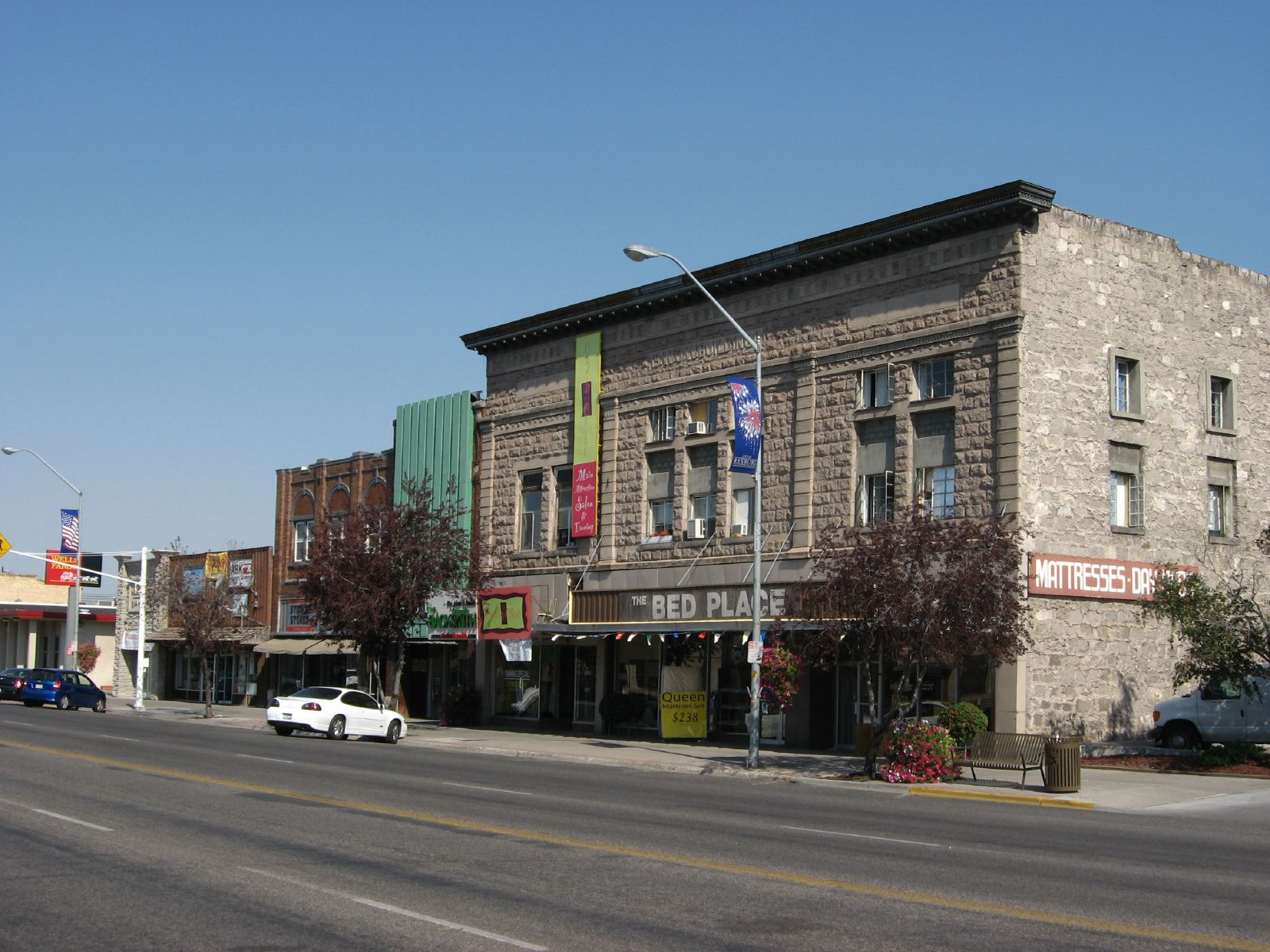
- A street view in downtown Rexburg.
- Motto: "America's Family Community"
- Location of Rexburg in Madison County, Idaho.

- Location in the United States
- Coordinates: 43°49′34″N 111°47′02″W
- Country: United States
- State: Idaho
- County: Madison

Area
  - Total: 10.10 sq mi (26.15 km^{2})
  - Land: 10.01 sq mi (25.93 km^{2})
  - Water: 0.089 sq mi (0.23 km^{2})
- Elevation: 4,862 ft (1,482 m)

Population (2020)
  - Total: 39,409
  - Density: 2,937.1/sq mi (1,134.01/km^{2})
- Time zone: UTC−7 (Mountain (MST))
  - Summer (DST): UTC−6 (MDT)
- ZIP codes: 83440, 83441, 83460
- Area codes: 208, 986
- FIPS code: 16-67420
- GNIS feature ID: 2410929
- Website: www.rexburg.org

Rexburg is a city in Madison County, Idaho, United States. The population was 39,409 at the 2020 census. The city is the county seat of Madison County, its largest city, and the last "dry town" in the USA. Rexburg is the principal city of the Rexburg micropolitan area, which includes Fremont and Madison counties. The city is home to Brigham Young University–Idaho (BYU-Idaho), a private university owned by the Church of Jesus Christ of Latter-day Saints (LDS Church).

== History ==
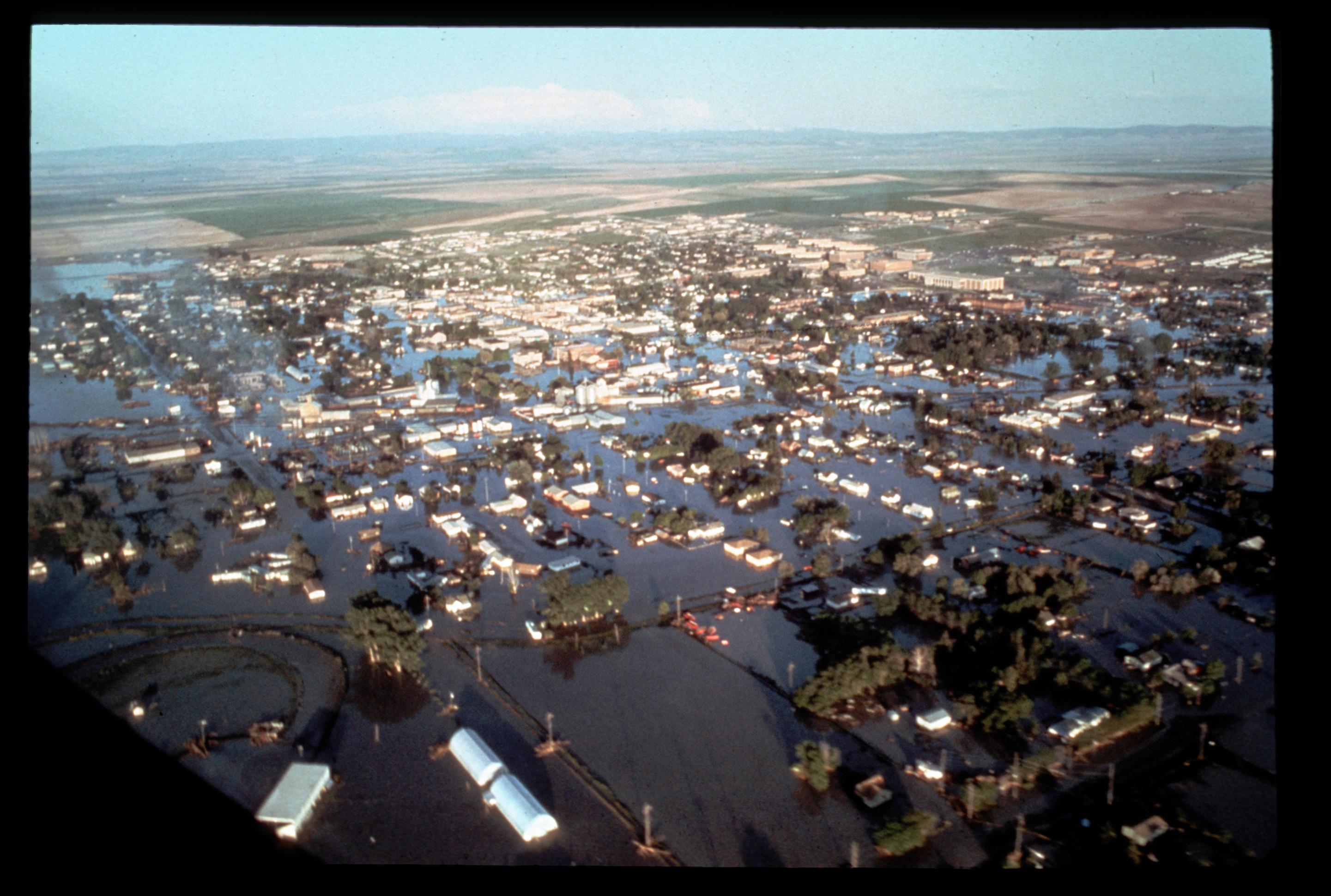
Rexburg flooded after the Teton Dam collapse

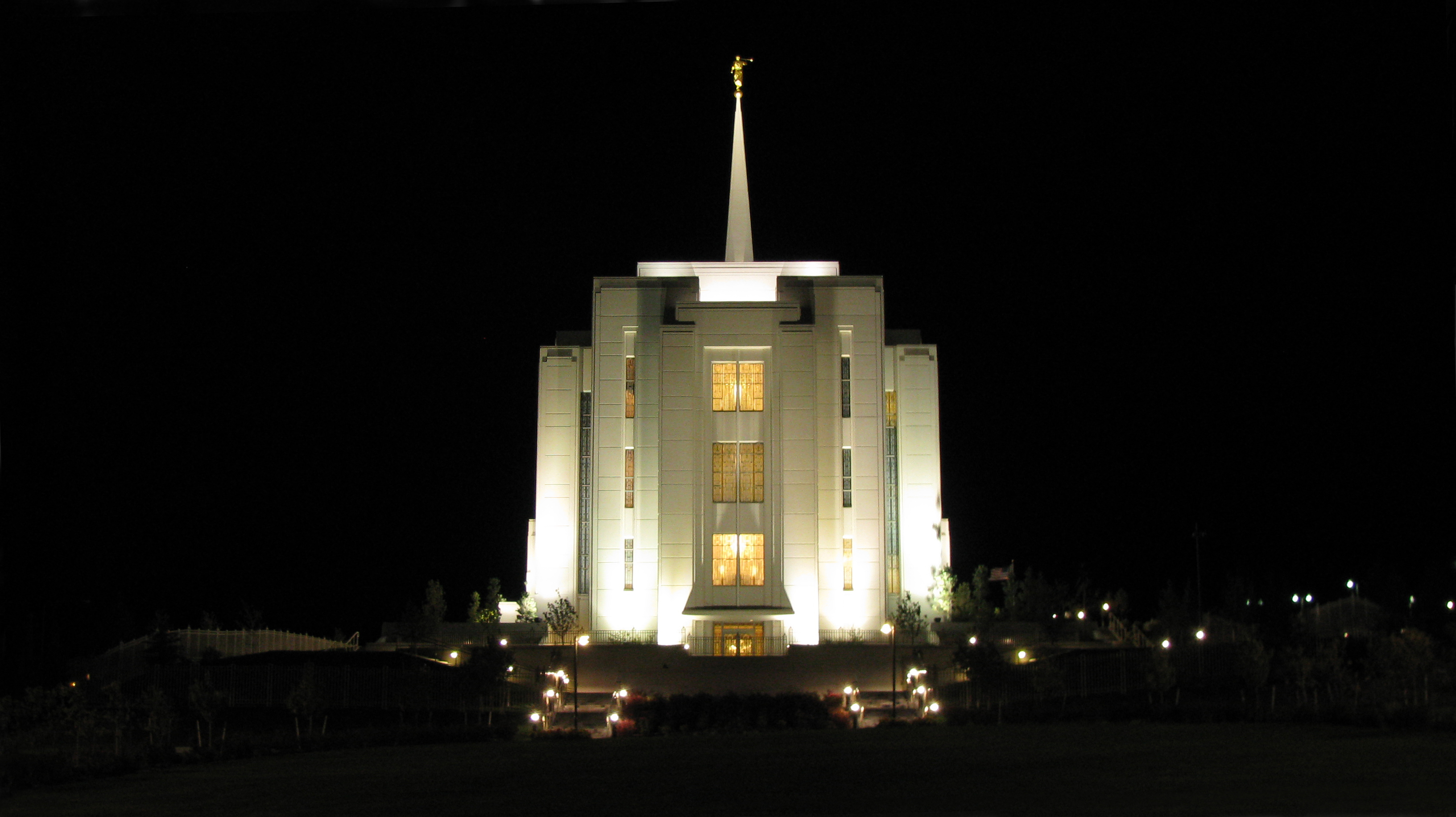
Rexburg Idaho Temple of the Church of Jesus Christ of Latter-day Saints

The city takes its name from founder Thomas Edwin Ricks. The city was incorporated in 1883.

The Navy Electronics Laboratory oceanographic research ship USS Rexburg was named for the city.

In June 1976, Rexburg was severely damaged by the Teton Dam Flood. The Teton River flowed through northern Rexburg, and left most of the city underwater for several days after the Teton Dam ruptured. A museum dedicated to the Teton Dam Flood and the history of Rexburg and the area, located in the basement of the Rexburg Tabernacle, has been a major city landmark for decades.

The city gained attention after the murders of siblings Tylee Ryan and J.J. Vallow, who went missing in September 2019 and were found dead in June 2020.

== Geography ==
According to the United States Census Bureau, the city has a total area of 9.84 square miles (25.49 km^{2}), of which 9.76 square miles (25.28 km^{2}) is land and 0.08 square miles (0.21 km^{2}) is water.

Much of the city, including BYU-Idaho and the Rexburg Idaho Temple, rests on top of a shield volcano just north of Rigby. Eruptions are not expected in the near future so far south; Yellowstone National Park and Island Park are thought to be the most likely settings for future volcanic activity in the area. Many different types of volcanoes exist near Rexburg, including cinder cones, spatter cones, other shield volcanoes, and volcanic fissures. There are lava fields to the west and south of Rexburg, the results of open fissure eruptions from about two thousand years ago. The nearby Craters of the Moon National Monument presents the most obvious features of this recent activity. Sediment deposits enriched by volcanism make the surrounding area famous for its production of large starch-rich potatoes.

Rexburg is close to the St. Anthony Sand Dunes, the West Entrance of Yellowstone National Park and the Teton Range.

== Climate ==
From a technical standpoint, Rexburg experiences a humid continental climate (Köppen: Dfb) with freezing winters and warm—if chilly at night—summers, and frosts have occurred in all months of the year. This categorization may be inaccurate, though, as its precipitation regime would suggest a cold semi-arid climate (BSk). It is described as an upper supratemperate dry climate within the bioclimatic scheme. The wettest year has been 1983 with 20.76 inches (527.3 mm) and the driest has been 1988 with 7.48 inches (190.0 mm) including rainless months in July and October, though the wettest month was June 2009 with 4.57 inches (116.1 mm). The average snow cover peaks at around 9 inches or 0.23 metres, whilst the heaviest snowfall in one month was 43.5 inches or 1.1 metres in December 1983. The most snow on the ground has been 38 inches or 0.97 metres which has occurred twice: firstly on March 6 and 7, 1985 and latterly on February 12, 2008.

Climate data for Rexburg, Idaho (Brigham Young University–Idaho), 1991–2020 normals, extremes 1977–present
Month	Jan	Feb	Mar	Apr	May	Jun	Jul	Aug	Sep	Oct	Nov	Dec	Year
Record high °F (°C)	52 (11)	60 (16)	73 (23)	84 (29)	91 (33)	102 (39)	102 (39)	99 (37)	96 (36)	87 (31)	71 (22)	61 (16)	102 (39)
Mean maximum °F (°C)	41 (5)	47 (8)	62 (17)	84 (29)	82 (28)	89 (32)	93 (34)	94 (34)	88 (31)	76 (24)	61 (16)	45 (7)	94 (34)
Mean daily maximum °F (°C)	29.5 (−1.4)	34.1 (1.2)	45.8 (7.7)	56.1 (13.4)	66.0 (18.9)	75.0 (23.9)	85.0 (29.4)	84.1 (28.9)	74.0 (23.3)	58.2 (14.6)	42.1 (5.6)	30.1 (−1.1)	56.7 (13.7)
Daily mean °F (°C)	21.8 (−5.7)	25.5 (−3.6)	35.9 (2.2)	44.6 (7.0)	53.5 (11.9)	61.0 (16.1)	68.5 (20.3)	67.1 (19.5)	58.3 (14.6)	45.7 (7.6)	32.9 (0.5)	22.6 (−5.2)	44.8 (7.1)
Mean daily minimum °F (°C)	14.2 (−9.9)	16.9 (−8.4)	26.0 (−3.3)	33.0 (0.6)	41.0 (5.0)	47.1 (8.4)	52.0 (11.1)	50.2 (10.1)	42.6 (5.9)	33.1 (0.6)	23.7 (−4.6)	15.1 (−9.4)	32.9 (0.5)
Mean minimum °F (°C)	−9.9 (−23.3)	−5.0 (−20.6)	7.3 (−13.7)	18.6 (−7.4)	26.4 (−3.1)	34.2 (1.2)	41.8 (5.4)	38.3 (3.5)	28.8 (−1.8)	16.4 (−8.7)	4.3 (−15.4)	−7.5 (−21.9)	−13.8 (−25.4)
Record low °F (°C)	−32 (−36)	−36 (−38)	−12 (−24)	10 (−12)	16 (−9)	29 (−2)	32 (0)	27 (−3)	14 (−10)	−3 (−19)	−13 (−25)	−31 (−35)	−36 (−38)
Average precipitation inches (mm)	1.22 (31)	0.78 (20)	0.92 (23)	1.16 (29)	1.81 (46)	1.49 (38)	0.59 (15)	0.70 (18)	1.04 (26)	1.13 (29)	0.71 (18)	1.08 (27)	12.63 (320)
Average snowfall inches (cm)	13.6 (35)	11.0 (28)	3.3 (8.4)	2.1 (5.3)	0.2 (0.51)	0.0 (0.0)	0.0 (0.0)	0.0 (0.0)	0.0 (0.0)	0.8 (2.0)	7.6 (19)	16.3 (41)	54.9 (139.21)
Average extreme snow depth inches (cm)	10 (25)	10 (25)	5 (13)	1 (2.5)	0 (0)	0 (0)	0 (0)	0 (0)	0 (0)	1 (2.5)	1 (2.5)	7 (18)	12 (30)
Average precipitation days (≥ 0.01 in)	10.8	7.6	7.5	9.3	11.1	8.3	5.3	6.2	5.8	7.9	6.7	10.9	97.4
Average snowy days (≥ 0.1 in)	7.0	5.4	2.2	1.1	0.2	0.0	0.0	0.0	0.0	0.6	3.8	6.9	27.2
Source 1: NOAA (snow/snow days 1981–2010)
Source 2: National Weather Service

== Demographics ==
Historical population
Census	Pop.	Note	%±
1900	1,081		—
1910	1,893		75.1%
1920	3,569		88.5%
1930	3,048		−14.6%
1940	3,437		12.8%
1950	4,253		23.7%
1960	4,767		12.1%
1970	8,272		73.5%
1980	11,559		39.7%
1990	14,302		23.7%
2000	17,257		20.7%
2010	25,484		47.7%
2020	39,409		54.6%

=== Racial and ethnic composition ===
Rexburg city, Idaho – Racial composition
Race (NH = Non-Hispanic)	2020	2010	2000	1990	1980
White alone (NH)	81.2% (32,002)	90.8% (23,151)	93.8% (16,183)	94.7% (13,539)	97.5% (11,271)
Black alone (NH)	1.7% (671)	0.6% (156)	0.2% (43)	0.2% (33)	0.3% (36)
American Indian alone (NH)	0.3% (132)	0.2% (44)	0.2% (36)	0.5% (71)	0.3% (34)
Asian alone (NH)	2.2% (862)	1.2% (301)	0.6% (111)	1.5% (211)	0.1% (9)
Pacific Islander alone (NH)	0.5% (190)	0.2% (44)	0.3% (48)		
Other race alone (NH)	0.4% (147)	0.1% (33)	0% (8)	0% (7)	0.1% (14)
Multiracial (NH)	3% (1,168)	1.3% (320)	0.8% (131)	—	—
Hispanic/Latino (any race)	10.8% (4,237)	5.6% (1,435)	4% (697)	3.1% (441)	1.7% (195)

=== 2020 census ===
As of the 2020 census, Rexburg had a population of 39,409. The median age was 22.8 years. 15.8% of residents were under the age of 18 and 4.0% of residents were 65 years of age or older. For every 100 females there were 94.8 males, and for every 100 females age 18 and over there were 93.3 males age 18 and over.

98.7% of residents lived in urban areas, while 1.3% lived in rural areas.

There were 8,853 households in Rexburg, of which 33.8% had children under the age of 18 living in them. Of all households, 70.3% were married-couple households, 11.5% were households with a male householder and no spouse or partner present, and 17.3% were households with a female householder and no spouse or partner present. About 14.3% of all households were made up of individuals and 3.5% had someone living alone who was 65 years of age or older.

There were 10,066 housing units, of which 12.1% were vacant. The homeowner vacancy rate was 0.9% and the rental vacancy rate was 13.0%.

Racial composition as of the 2020 census
Race	Number	Percent
White	33,099	84.0%
Black or African American	693	1.8%
American Indian and Alaska Native	193	0.5%
Asian	879	2.2%
Native Hawaiian and Other Pacific Islander	199	0.5%
Some other race	2,082	5.3%
Two or more races	2,264	5.7%
Hispanic or Latino (of any race)	4,237	10.8%

The most reported ancestries in 2020 were:

- English (27.3%)
- German (10.5%)
- Irish (6.3%)
- Mexican (5.7%)
- Scottish (4%)
- Danish (3.3%)
- Swedish (2.9%)
- Welsh (1.7%)
- Italian (1.6%)
- French (1.6%)

In 2010, city officials contested the census figures on the grounds that many college students were out of town while census workers were counting Rexburg's population.

=== 2010 census ===
At the 2010 census there were 25,484 people, 7,179 households, and 4,925 families living in the city. The population density was 2,611.1 inhabitants per square mile (1,008.2/km^{2}). There were 7,617 housing units at an average density of 780.4 per square mile (301.3/km^{2}). The racial makeup of the city was 93.8% White, 0.6% African American, 0.2% Native American, 1.2% Asian, 0.2% Pacific Islander, 2.3% from other races, and 1.7% from two or more races. Hispanic or Latino of any race were 5.6%.

Of the 7,179 households 33.8% had children under the age of 18 living with them, 62.6% were married couples living together, 4.4% had a female householder with no husband present, 1.6% had a male householder with no wife present, and 31.4% were non-families. 9.2% of households were one person and 3.5% were one person aged 65 or older. The average household size was 3.41 and the average family size was 3.17.

The median age was 22.3 years. 20.4% of residents were under the age of 18; 49.2% were between the ages of 18 and 24; 19.9% were from 25 to 44; 7% were from 45 to 64; and 3.7% were 65 or older. The gender makeup of the city was 47.3% male and 52.7% female.

=== 2000 census ===
At the 2000 census there were 17,257 people, 4,274 households, and 2,393 families living in the city. The population density was 3,534.4 inhabitants per square mile (1,364.6/km^{2}). There were 4,533 housing units at an average density of 928.4 per square mile (358.5/km^{2}). The racial makeup of the city was 95.20% White, 0.30% African American, 0.31% Native American, 0.66% Asian, 0.28% Pacific Islander, 2.23% from other races, and 1.03% from two or more races. Hispanic or Latino of any race were 4.04%.

Of the 4,274 households 30.5% had children under the age of 18 living with them, 47.7% were married couples living together, 5.9% had a female householder with no husband present, and 44.0% were non-families. 12.7% of households were one person and 5.5% were one person aged 65 or older. The average household size was 3.71 and the average family size was 3.45.

The age distribution was 18.3% under the age of 18, 57.3% from 18 to 24, 11.9% from 25 to 44, 7.5% from 45 to 64, and 4.9% 65 or older. The median age was 20 years. For every 100 females, there were 82.4 males. For every 100 females age 18 and over, there were 77.0 males.

The median household income was $26,965 and the median family income was $36,047. Males had a median income of $27,280 versus $17,592 for females. The per capita income for the city was $9,173. About 13.2% of families and 44.4% of the population were below the poverty line, including 11.7% of those under age 18 and 12.3% of those age 65 or over.

=== Religion ===
It is estimated that 95 percent of Rexburg's population are members of the LDS Church.

== Government ==
=== Politics ===
In 2006, Tim Grieve of Salon stated that Rexburg was the "reddest place in America," owing to the area's strong conservative majority and political trends. Since 1980, no Republican presidential candidate has won less than 57 percent of the Madison County vote. In that same period, Republican presidential candidates polled more than 90 percent of the county's vote on three occasions: Ronald Reagan in 1984, George W. Bush in 2004 and Mitt Romney in 2012. John McCain came close to this level in 2008, drawing 85 percent of the vote.

== Education ==
=== Public schools ===
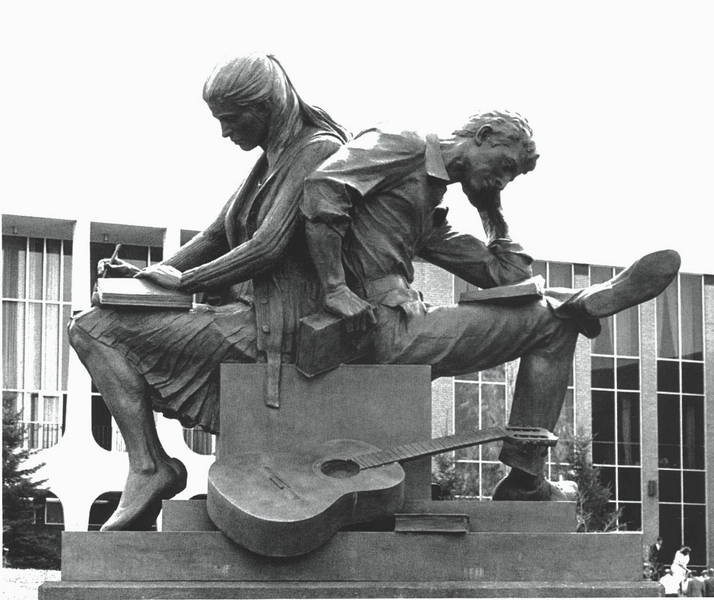
Monument located at Brigham Young University-Idaho

Madison School District 321 is the school district for almost all of Rexburg, except for a few blocks. Those few blocks are in the Sugar-Salem Joint School District 322.

The Madison school district supports six elementary schools; Adams, Burton, Hibbard, Kennedy, Lincoln, and South Fork. Madison Middle School follows the elementary school, serving grades 5–6. Madison Junior High School serves grades 7–9. The two high schools within the city limits are Central High and Madison High School.

The Sugar-Salem district's comprehensive high school is Sugar-Salem High School in Sugar City.

=== Higher education ===
Rexburg is home to BYU-Idaho, a private institution operated by the LDS Church. The university began as a small high school-level academy in 1888 and was eventually established as Ricks College, in honor of Mormon pioneer and city founder, Thomas E. Ricks. On August 10, 2001, it officially became a four-year university and assumed the name BYU-Idaho.

The Rexburg College of Massage Therapy (RCMT) is an accredited institution specializing in massage therapy, offering courses in anatomy, kinesiology, Swedish massage, prenatal massage, sports massage and therapy, and deep tissue massage. The college offers an eight-month program to prepare students to pass the exam to become a licensed massage therapist. Courses also help students learn to run a small business.

College of Eastern Idaho includes this county in its catchment zone; however this county is not in its taxation zone.

=== Madison Memorial Hospital ===
The City of Rexburg and the surrounding areas are serviced by Madison Memorial Hospital located just east of the city's downtown area. The hospital offers regular classes in an attempt to educate the community on such things as preparing for childbirth and first aid for children, as well as holding Conferences and Health Fairs. In 2012, Rachel Gonzales - Madison's CEO, was ranked among the "50 Rural Hospital CEO's to Know" by Becker's Hospital Review. In 2013, Madison was ranked the healthiest county in Idaho. In 2014, the Leapfrog Group shared the results of a study which indicates that Madison Memorial Hospital received an A in comparison to other hospitals in the United States.

== Media ==
Rexburg is part of the Idaho Falls–Pocatello media market, which includes southeastern Idaho and parts of northwestern Wyoming. Media outlets licensed to or located in Rexburg include:

Television

- K51KL, channel 51

Radio

- KBYR 91.5 FM BYU-Idaho Radio (religious)
- KBYI 94.3 FM BYU-Idaho Radio (public)
- KRXK 1230 AM (sports)

Newspapers

- Rexburg Standard Journal
- BYU-Idaho Scroll
- Explore Rexburg
- Ennui Magazine

== In popular culture ==
- Rexburg is mentioned in the 4th verse of the song "I've Been Everywhere" by Hank Snow, a song that was also sung by Johnny Cash.
- The nearby St. Anthony sand dunes are referenced in the movie Napoleon Dynamite, as the location where Kip and Napoleon's grandmother breaks her coccyx.

== Notable people ==
- Brandon Bair, professional football player in the National Football League (NFL), born in Rexburg
- Chad Daybell, author and convicted murderer who lived in Rexburg
- Jim Dennis, Hall of Fame harness racing driver, born in Rexburg
- Vernon M. Guymon, brigadier general in the Marine Corps and naval aviator, born in Rexburg
- D. Mark Hegsted, Harvard University nutritionist, born in Rexburg
- Bill Hillman, Broadcaster, AFTRA President (1979–1984)
- Christian Jacobs, co-creator of children's TV show Yo Gabba Gabba! and lead singer for The Aquabats, born in Rexburg
- Paul Kruger, professional football player in the NFL, born in Rexburg
- Matt Lindstrom, professional baseball player in Major League Baseball (MLB), born and raised in Rexburg
- Clayton Mortensen, professional baseball player in MLB, born and raised in Rexburg
- Mark Ricks, Idaho state legislator, lifelong resident of Rexburg
- James LeVoy Sorenson, businessman and inventor, born in Rexburg
- Wayne D. Wright, jockey, winner of 1942 Kentucky Derby, 1945 Preakness and 1934 Belmont Stakes; born in Rexburg
