= College of Eastern Idaho =

Community college in Idaho Falls, Idaho, U.S.

Coordinates: 43.48547°N 111.98647°W

- Former names: Eastern Idaho Vocational School (1970-1972); Eastern Idaho Vocational Technical School (1972-1989); Eastern Idaho Technical College (1989-2017)
- Motto: "Redefining what comes next"
- Type: Public community college
- Established: 1970; 56 years ago
- Parent institution: Idaho State Board of Education
- Accreditation: NWCCU
- President: Lori Barber
- Total staff: 154
- Students: 2,565 (Fall 2023)
- Location: Idaho Falls, Idaho, United States
- Campus: 60 acres (0.24 km^{2}); Small city
- Other campuses: Rexburg; Salmon
- Nickname: Falcon
- Mascot: Frankie the Falcon
- Website: www.cei.edu

College of Eastern Idaho (CEI) is a public community college in Idaho Falls, Idaho. It was founded in 1970 as Eastern Idaho Vocational School, then in 1972 was renamed to be called Eastern Idaho Vocational Technical School. In 1989, the college became a technical college and was renamed to Eastern Idaho Technical College. In May 2017, Bonneville County residents voted to create a community college district, allowing Eastern Idaho Technical College to become a community college. In July 2017, the Idaho State Board of Education appointed five community college trustees and completed the transition to community college. Together with the College of Southern Idaho, College of Western Idaho and North Idaho College, CEI is one of only four comprehensive community colleges in Idaho.

The college's divisions include Business, Office, and Technology; Health Professions; Trades and Industry; and General Education. College of Eastern Idaho awards an Associate of Arts degree and an Associate of Science degree which are designed to serve students seeking to continue their education at a four-year university. College of Eastern Idaho also offers Advanced Technical Certificates, courses in adult basic education, GED testing, and workforce training.

The district of the College of Eastern Idaho includes only Bonneville County. On November 7, 2017, voters in Bingham County had the opportunity to join the community college district. However, the proposal was defeated.

Enrollment as of summer 2018 stood at 1,300 students.

== Catchment ==
The catchment area includes all of the following counties: Bonneville, Butte, Clark, Custer, Fremont, Jefferson, Lemhi, Madison, and Teton. Additionally, it includes a portion of Bingham County. Of the counties, one, Bonneville, is in its taxation zone.
