= List of U.S. Highways in Idaho =

U.S. Highways of the Idaho State Highway System
- Highway markers for U.S. Highways 2, 95, and 195

System information
- Maintained by ITD

Highway names
- Interstates: Interstate n (I-n)
- US Highways: U.S. Highway n (US-n)
- State: Idaho State Highway n (SH-n)

System links
- Idaho State Highway System; Interstate; US; State

The U.S. Highways in Idaho are the segments of the United States Numbered Highway System owned and maintained by the Idaho Transportation Department (ITD) in the U.S. state of Idaho.

== Mainline highways ==
Number	Length (mi)	Length (km)	Southern or western terminus	Northern or eastern terminus	Formed	Removed	Notes
US 2	80.152	128.992	US 2 / SH-41 in Oldtown	US 2 near Moyie Springs	1926	current	
US 10	193.23	310.97	US 10 in State Line	US 10 at Lookout Pass	1926	1977	Replaced by I-90
US 12	174.210	280.364	US 12 in Lewiston	US 12 at Lolo Pass	1962	current	
US 20	406.300	653.876	US 20 / US 26 near Parma	US 20 near West Yellowstone, MT	1940	current	
US 26	402.500	647.761	US 20 / US 26 near Parma	US 26 near Alpine, WY	1952	current	
US 30	455.481	733.026	US 30 near Fruitland	US 30 near Montpelier	1926	current	
US 30N	—	—	—	—	—	—	
US 30N	—	—	—	—	—	—	
US 30S	—	—	—	—	—	—	
US 89	44.240	71.197	US 89 near Fish Haven	US 89 near Geneva	1939	current	
US 91	122.866	197.734	US 91 near Preston	US 26 in Idaho Falls	1926	current	
US 93	350.819	564.588	US 93 near Jackpot, NV	US 93 at Lost Trail Pass	1926	current	
US 95	538.562	866.732	US 95 near Homedale	BC 95 near Eastport	1926	current	
US 95E	—	—	—	—	—	—	
US 95W	—	—	—	—	—	—	
US 191	—	—	US 191 near Malad City	US 191 at Targhee Pass	1926	1978	Replaced by I-15
US 195	0.577	0.929	US 95 near Lewiston	US 195 near Lewiston	1979	current	
US 287	—	—	US 287 at Raynolds Pass	US 287 at Targhee Pass	—	—	Replaced by SH-87
US 410	3	4.8	US 410 in Lewiston	US 95 in Lewiston	1926	1967	Replaced by US-12
US 630	—	—	US 630 near Weiser	US 95 in Weiser	1928	1931	Replaced by US-95 Spur
Former

== Special routes ==
Number	Length (mi)	Length (km)	Southern or western terminus	Northern or eastern terminus	Formed	Removed	Notes
US 10A	62.648	100.822	US 10A in Newport, WA	US 10A near Heron	1941	1967	Replaced with SH-200 and US-2
US 10 Bus.	—	—	—	—	—	—	
US 20 Bus.	3.640	5.858	—	—	—	—	Serves Idaho Falls
US 20 Bus.	1.684	2.710	—	—	—	—	Serves Rigby
US 20 Bus.	2.879	4.633	—	—	—	—	Serves St. Anthony
US 20 Spur	—	—	—	—	—	—	Serves Boise
US 26 Bus.	2.981	4.797	—	—	—	—	Serves Ririe
US 30 Bus.	—	—	—	—	—	—	Serves Pocatello
US 30 Bus.	10.270	16.528	—	—	—	—	Serves Lava Hot Springs
US 91 Bus.	—	—	—	—	—	—	Serves McCammon
US 91 Bus.	—	—	—	—	—	—	Serves Inkom
US 93 Alt.	—	—	—	—	—	—	
US 93 Bus.	8.110	13.052	—	—	—	—	Serves Twin Falls
US 93 Spur	0.91	1.46	—	—	—	—	Serves Twin Falls
US 93 Spur	0.391	0.629	—	—	—	—	Serves Challis
US 95 Bus.	1.420	2.285	—	—	—	—	Serves Cottonwood
US 95 Bus.	1.757	2.828	—	—	—	—	Serves Craigmont
US 95 Bus.	4.021	6.471	—	—	—	—	Serves Winchester
US 95 Bus.	—	—	—	—	—	—	Serves Bonners Ferry
US 95 Spur	—	—	—	—	—	—	Serves Payette
US 95 Spur	2.332	3.753	—	—	—	—	Serves Weiser
US 95 Spur	0.552	0.888	—	—	—	—	Connects to US 195
Former

== See also ==
- List of Interstate Highways in Idaho
- List of state highways in Idaho
