= Idaho State Highway 87 =

State highway in Idaho, United States

State Highway 87
- SH-87 highlighted in red

Route information
- Maintained by ITD
- Length: 9.143 mi (14.714 km)

Major junctions
- South end: US 20 in Island Park
- North end: MT 87 at the Montana state line at Raynolds Pass

Location
- Country: United States
- State: Idaho
- Counties: Fremont

Highway system
- Idaho State Highway System; Interstate; US; State
← I-86	→ US 89

State Highway 87 (SH-87) is a 9.133-mile (14.698 km) state highway in Fremont County, Idaho, United States, that connects U.S. Route 20 (US-20) in Island Park with Montana Highway 87 (MT 87) at the Montana state line.

== Route description ==
SH-87 begins at a T intersection with US-20 in northern Island Park, just east of the Henrys Lake Airport. The highway proceeds northwest, traveling through rural area, before bending west and entering the small community of Island Park. The highway travels parallel to the northern shore of Henrys Lake for a short distance, before peeling off and proceeding northwest. The road continues northwest through rural area, before terminating at the southern terminus of MT 87 at the Idaho-Montana state line in Raynolds Pass on the Continental Divide. MT 87 continues northward from the border through Missouri Flats to its northern terminus at a junction with U.S. Route 287.

== Major intersections ==
The entire route is in Fremont County.

Location	mi	km	Destinations	Notes
Island Park	0.000	0.000	US 20 east – West Yellowstone, Bozeman US 20 west – Ashton, Idaho Falls	
Raynolds Pass	9.143	14.714	Idaho–Montana state line on the Continental Divide	
Raynolds Pass	9.143	14.714	MT 87 north – Ennis	Continuation into Montana
1.000 mi = 1.609 km; 1.000 km = 0.621 mi

== See also ==
- List of state highways in Idaho
