= Lake, Idaho =

Unincorporated community in the state of Idaho, United States

Lake was a former unincorporated community located on the north shore of Henrys Lake in Fremont County, Idaho, United States, that is now part of the city of Island Park. The site of the former community is at 44°40′01″N 111°23′37″W.

Island Park is part of the Rexburg Micropolitan Statistical Area.

== Transportation ==
A state highway passes through the community:

- SH-87

== See also ==
- Flat Rock, Idaho
- Last Chance, Idaho
- Staley Springs, Idaho
