= Montana Highway 87 =

State highway in Montana

Montana Highway 87
- MT 87 highlighted in red

Route information
- Maintained by MDT
- Length: 8.571 mi (13.794 km)
- Existed: October 9, 1922–present

Major junctions
- South end: SH-87 at the Idaho state line at Raynolds Pass
- North end: US 287 west of Quake Lake

Location
- Country: United States
- State: Montana
- Counties: Madison

Highway system
- Montana Highway System; Interstate; US; State; Secondary
← US 87	→ US 89

Montana Highway 87 (MT 87) is a primary state highway in Madison County in Montana, United States. The highway travels through mainly rural areas in Raynolds Pass, from the Montana–Idaho state line to an intersection with U.S. Route 287 (US 287). The route travels through a portion of Gallatin National Forest. In 1922, a road in the location of MT 87 was added to the highway system, and a few years later the road was designated as portions of two early auto trails. In 1959, the route was rapidly improved due to the collapse of US 287 nearby. During 1967, much of the highway was reconstructed along its current location.

== Route description ==
MT 87 begins at the Montana–Idaho state line, traveling through Raynolds Pass. The highway proceeds northward, intersecting a small road before entering rural areas within Gallatin National Forest. The route continues northeast, intersecting several forest roads before bending northwestward. The route intersects several small roads while it runs parallel to a small creek. It crosses over the Madison River after passing several small buildings. The highway continues northwestward to its northern terminus, an at-grade intersection with US 287. The highway is maintained by the Montana Department of Transportation (MDT). Part of the job of the MDT is to measure traffic along the highway. These counts are taken using a metric called annual average daily traffic (AADT). This is a statistical calculation of the average daily number of vehicles that travel along a portion of the highway. In 2011, the MT 87 had an AADT count of 583 vehicles. No portion of the highway is listed as part of the National Highway System (NHS), a network of roads important to the country's economy, defense, and mobility.

== History ==
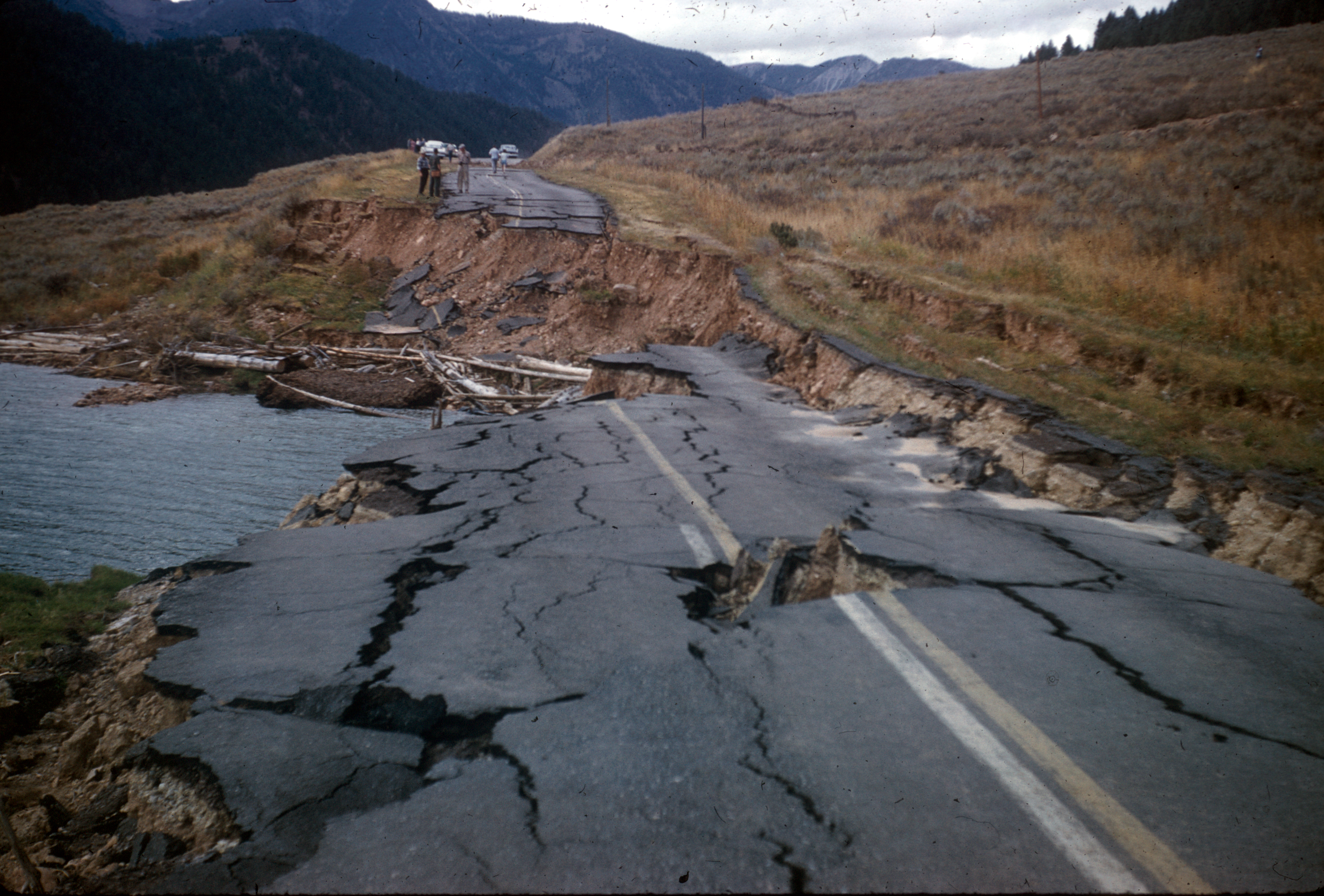
A portion of U.S. Route 287 that collapsed along Hebgen Lake, 1959

On October 9, 1922, a road in the general location of MT 87 was added to the Montana State Highway system. By at least 1924, an auto trail known as the Banff Grand Canyon Road ran along the highway in the general location of MT 87. The next year, the highway had been given a graded dirt surface, and was designated as part of the Great White Way auto trail, as well as the Banff Grand Canyon Road. Between 1925 and 1927, the auto trail designations were removed from the stretch of highway near present-day MT 87. By 1937, the main highway had been shifted north of the location of MT 87, and had been numbered as State Highway 1. A road remained in the location of MT 87, although it was unnumbered. This road had also been extended several miles northward to Lyon.

By 1951, the highway had been reconstructed generally along MT 87's present location, and it had been upgraded to an improved gravel road. In 1959, the road in the location of MT 87 was rapidly improved in order to serve as an alternate routing to US 287. Portions of US 287 around Hebgen Lake collapsed and crumbled as a result of the 1959 Hebgen Lake earthquake. After US 287 was fixed, the highway's importance decreased. In 1962, the portions of the highway from the southern terminus to present-day milepost 8.395 were reconstructed along the current location. In 1967, the rest of the highway was reconstructed along the present location. By 1987, the highway had been numbered as MT 87. The route had also been paved.

== Major intersections ==
The entire route is in Madison County.

Location	mi	km	Destinations	Notes
Raynolds Pass	0.000	0.000	SH-87 south – Island Park, Ashton	Continuation into Idaho
Raynolds Pass	0.000	0.000	Idaho–Montana state line on the Continental Divide	
	8.571	13.794	US 287 – Ennis, Quake Lake, Hebgen Lake, West Yellowstone	Northern terminus
1.000 mi = 1.609 km; 1.000 km = 0.621 mi

== See also ==
- List of state highways in Montana
