= Staley Springs, Idaho =

Unincorporated community in the state of Idaho, United States

Staley Springs was a former unincorporated community located on the northwest shore of Henrys Lake in Fremont County, Idaho, United States, that is now part of the city of Island Park.

== Description ==
The community was named after Ed Staley, an early settler in the area. Prior to his purchase of the site, it was known as Sawtell's Fish Farm. The site of the former community in at 44°39′37″N 111°26′07″W.

Island Park is part of the Rexburg Micropolitan Statistical Area.

== See also ==
- Flat Rock, Idaho
- Lake, Idaho
- Last Chance, Idaho
