= Flat Rock, Idaho =

Unincorporated community in the state of Idaho, United States

Flat Rock (also known as Macks Inn) was a former unincorporated community along Henrys Fork in Fremont County, Idaho, United States, that is now part of the city of Island Park. The site of the former community in at 44°30′02″N 111°20′11″W.

Island Park is part of the Rexburg Micropolitan Statistical Area.

== Transportation ==
A U.S. Highway passes through the community, as did a former U.S. Highway:

- US 20
- US 191, until it was rerouted entirely out of the state of Idaho in 1981

== See also ==
- Lake, Idaho
- Last Chance, Idaho
- Staley Springs, Idaho
