= Island Park, Idaho =

- City
- Location of Island Park in Fremont County, Idaho.
- Coordinates: 44°29′59″N 111°22′20″W
- Country: United States
- State: Idaho
- County: Fremont

Area
  - Total: 6.19 sq mi (16.03 km^{2})
  - Land: 6.08 sq mi (15.75 km^{2})
  - Water: 0.11 sq mi (0.28 km^{2})
- Elevation: 6,359 ft (1,938 m)

Population (2020)
  - Total: 193
  - Density: 31.7/sq mi (12.3/km^{2})
- Time zone: UTC-7 (Mountain (MST))
  - Summer (DST): UTC-6 (MDT)
- ZIP codes: 83429, 83433
- Area code: 208
- FIPS code: 16-40600
- GNIS feature ID: 2410121
- Website: islandparkid.govoffice2.com

Island Park is a city in Fremont County, Idaho, United States. The city's population was 193 at the 2020 census, down from 286 in 2010. The city was incorporated by owners of the many lodges and resorts along U.S. Route 20 in 1947, primarily to circumvent Idaho's liquor laws that prohibited the sale of liquor outside of city limits. It is only 500 feet (150 m) wide in most locations and at 33 miles (53 km), claims to have the longest "Main Street" in the world.

Island Park is part of the Rexburg Micropolitan Statistical Area.

== History ==
=== Middle Pleistocene epoch ===
About 50,000 years ago, the area where the city is currently located was actually a very large volcano that exploded with extraordinary force. The volcanic eruption seems to have been so big to reach as far as Kansas.

=== Pre-European History ===
The native population within the area was mostly focused on the shores of the Snake River and around the shores of Henry’s Lake, and was pretty diverse. The local native population included: the Snake, Bannock, Lemhi, Tukudika, Crow and Flathead.

Some sources suggest that during their escape from general Howard, the legendary chiefs known as Joseph Perce and Nez Perce spent time in the nearby Henry's lake for a brief period of time in the year 1877. This inspired the creation of the local Gold Trails Loop, and the Nez Perce Historic Trail.

=== The arrival of the Europeans ===
The area started to be explored, scouted and used as a hunting spot by Europeans around the 1810s, with various people passing by but not truly settling.

The very first expedition in the nearby area was led by Lewis & Clark between 1805 and 1806. Their expedition detailed the various resources of the area which could be hunted or gathered, attracting new explorers and hunters to come in this zone.

Amongst these explorers, there was Major Andrew Henry, together with Pierre Menard, who named various local geographic spots, and led an expedition in the summer of 1910. After the success of Henry's expedition, and old member of Lewis and Clark's expedition, John Colter, revisited the area guiding the same team as Henry's, founding the nearby Fort Henry and hunting various wild animals in the area.

In 1818 Donald McKenzie, hearing the success of John Colter's expedition also started to operate in the area, procuring himself up to 75,000 beaver pelts in just some years. This attracted many possible investors, pioneers and likely future settlers of the area.

=== Founding of the city ===
The very first permanent European settlers came starting from 1868 through the 1870s. They included Gilman Sawtell, Richard “Dick” Rock and George Rea.

Gilman Sawtell was the first of the three to settle in the year 1868. He was known locally as the “Indian fighter”, probably for his past activities. He took on various infrastructure projects in the area, including the very first road built into Yellowstone Park, which he completed by the end of his first year. He named a local peak after himself, and it is still known as Sawtell peak. He also lent his name to a ranch which he owned. Notably he welcomed the Hayden Survey Expedition into his ranch and home in 1872, and the fish, which he caught in Henry's Lake for the most part, reached markets as far as Butte and Salt Lake City.

Richard W. "Dick" Rock also notably participated in the local economy by catching various wildlife, which he called "pets", and shipped them to nearby national zoos.

George Rea, the third settler, and last for a long while, specialized in hunting and operating his nearby trout farm. He most notably accompanied President Theodore Roosevelt various times in various posts around the area to hunt. It was in 1895 that he opened the first known, private fish farm in the area in order to satisfy the demand from the fish markets of Utah and Montana.

=== Recent History ===
By the late 1890s, the city started to expand. A.S . Trude, a settler from Chicago, arrived in the area in this period and created the "Trudes Ranch" on the banks of the snake river, which is now known with the name of "Island Park's Reservoir", which would not be finished completely until at least 1935.

In 1902, three wealthy Oregon Short Line Railroad owners, alongside various investors from the Union Pacific Railroad bought a portion of land in the area, operating what would become the "Island Park Land and Cattle Company", with E.H. Harriman buying a large share of holdings in 1908. The company would be operation up until 1977 when the whole territory was gifted to the State of Idaho by Roland and W. Averell Harriman, and renamed Harriman State Park.

By the 1930s, the city was full of life and visitors, including President H. Hoover.

Due to the need to monitor the liquor that was being sold within the area, in 1947, Island Park became incorporated in May 1947.

During WW2, between the years of 1941 and 1942, there were concrete plans to create an U.S Army camp which would have been able to host up to 35.000 men within it. However, the project was dismissed.

== Geography ==
=== City geography ===
Island Park is located at an elevation of 6,293 feet (1,918 m) above sea level, making it the highest city in Idaho.

According to the United States Census Bureau, the city has a total area of 6.77 square miles (17.53 km^{2}), of which, 6.64 square miles (17.20 km^{2}) is land and 0.13 square miles (0.34 km^{2}) is water.

=== Regional geography ===
The area was known as Island Park long before the 33-mile (53 km)-long town was incorporated. The area known as Island Park is mostly a large crater or caldera named the Henry's Fork Caldera that was created by the same hotspot that created the earlier Island Park Caldera and the later Yellowstone Caldera.

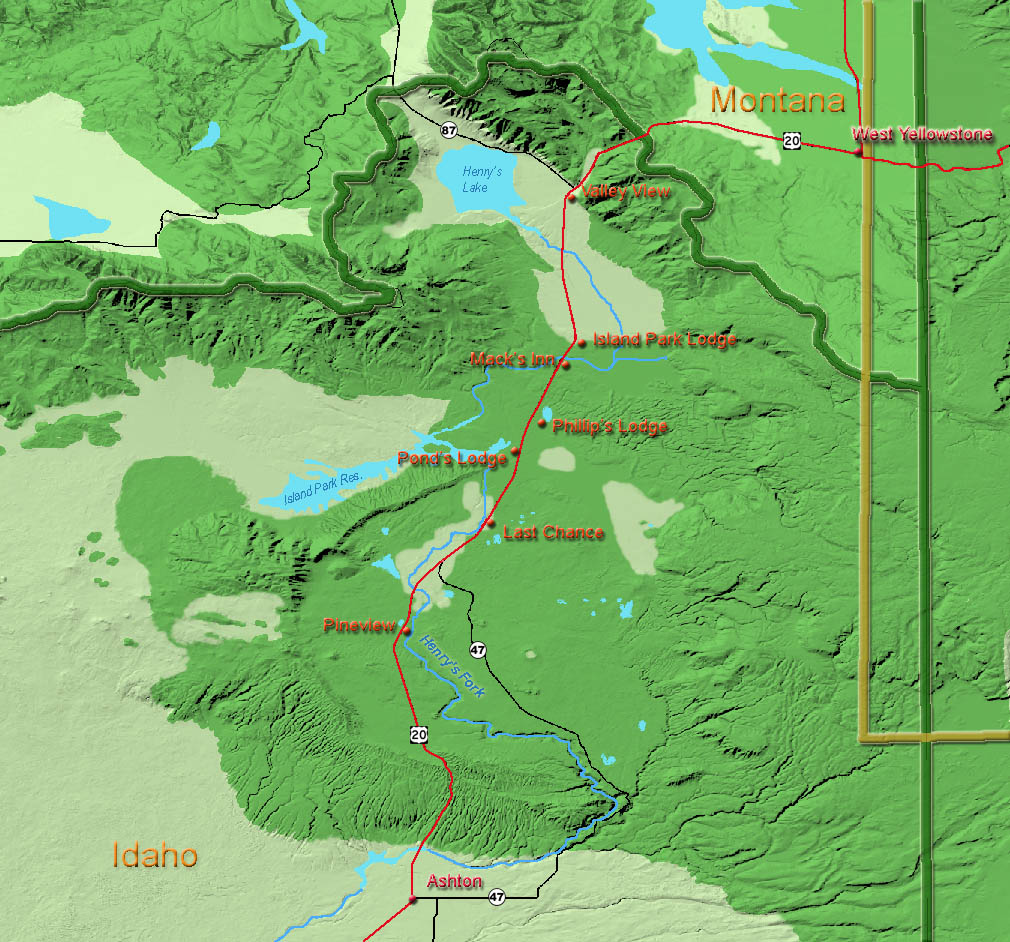
Upper Henrys Fork drainage

In addition to the portion which lies on the Henry's Fork Caldera, about a third of what is known as Island Park is north of the caldera, extending across Henry's Lake Flat and Henry's Lake towards the Idaho/Montana border. Henry's Lake Flat is a flat bottomed valley between high mountain ranges, with Henrys Lake at the northwest end of the flats. Mount Jefferson, south of Henry's Lake, is 10,203 feet (3,110 m) high and Targhee Peak, north of Henrys Lake is 10,240 feet (3,121 m) high. The most famous of Island Park's peaks, however, is the 9,886-foot (3,013 m) Sawtell Peak, south of Henrys Lake near Mount Jefferson. The peak is known for its beauty and is named for a perceived resemblance to a Native American chief's profile while napping. The peak has also been called Chief Rains in the Face. Sawtell Peak is topped by a FAA radar dome and is visible from nearly anywhere in Island Park.

Although much smaller than either the Island Park Caldera or the Yellowstone Caldera, the Henry's Fork Caldera is still one of the largest calderas in the world and is the only large caldera in the Yellowstone region that is plainly visible. It has a nearly level 20-mile (32 km) wide circular floor that slopes slightly towards the southeast. The caldera floor is at about 6,000 feet (1,830 m) of elevation with the rim generally being several hundred feet higher. The Henry's Lake Flat area, north of the caldera, is a little higher. Henry's Lake sits at about 6,500 feet (1,980 m), with the flats sloping slightly southward towards the caldera.

The Island Park area is mostly forested with many meadows and grasslands. It is mostly level, but is surrounded by forested hills and high mountains in the north. The Henrys Fork of the Snake River meanders through Island Park with its headwaters at Henry's Lake and at Big Springs (Idaho). The Henry's Fork is impounded by Island Park Dam to form Island Park Reservoir outside the north rim of the caldera. In fact, the entire south bank of Island Park Reservoir is formed by the northern slope of the caldera. The Henry's Fork crosses through the caldera and then cascades off from it at Upper and Lower Mesa Falls.

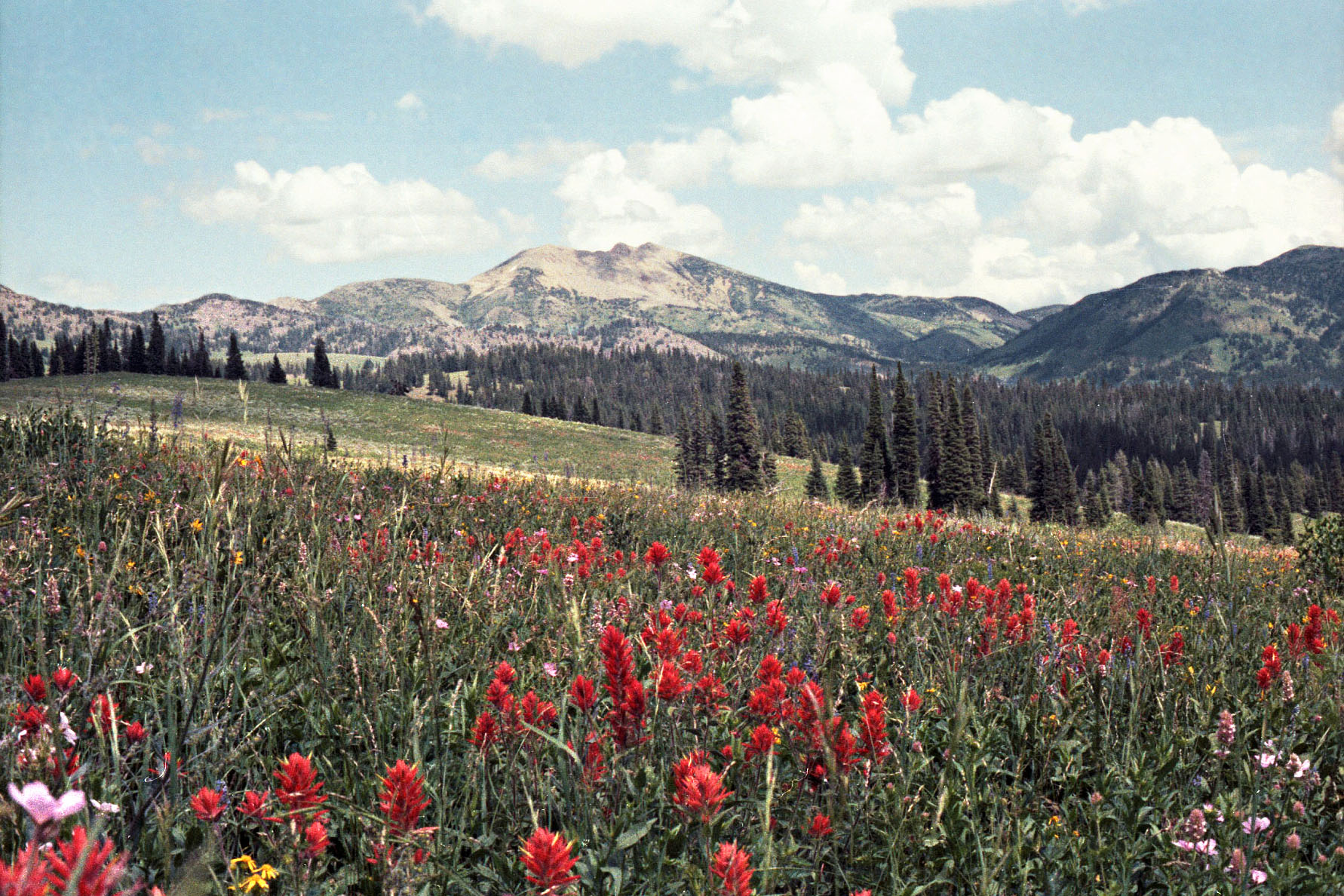
Mt. Jefferson and Indian Paintbrush

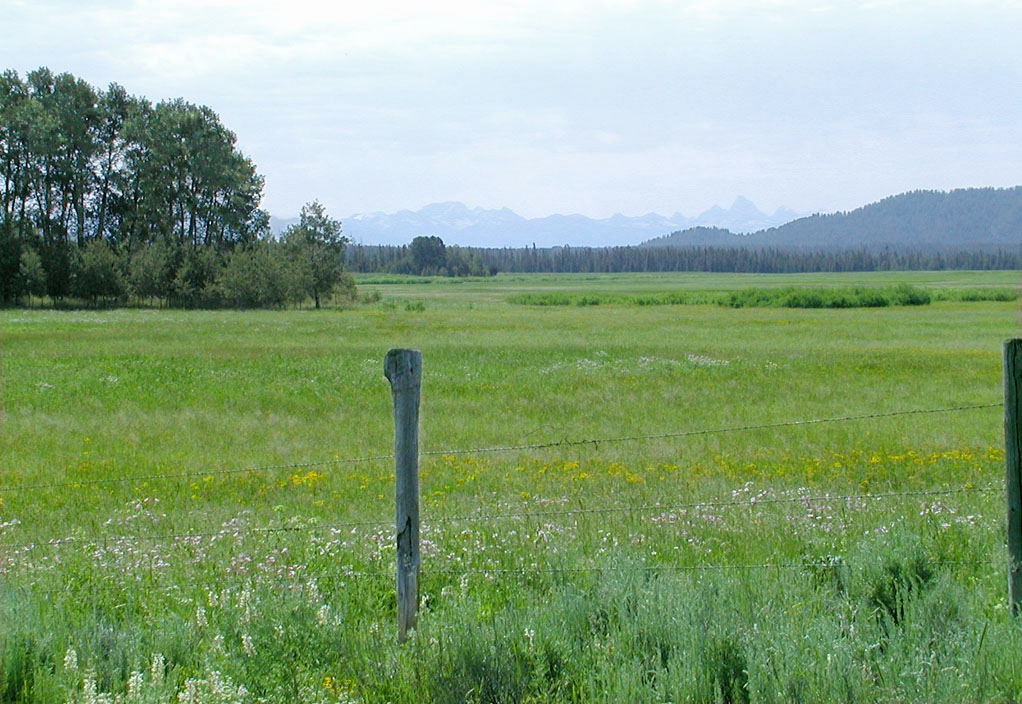
Meadow in Island Park revealing flat bottom of caldera floor, Teton Range in background

The geography of Island Park is actually unique and distinctive. It is largely flat and it has unusually high precipitation. Island Park is at the same 6,000 feet (1,830 m) elevation as Teton Valley, Idaho, Jackson Hole, Wyoming, or the Centennial Valley, Montana; yet while these nearby areas are semi-arid prairie or even desert areas receiving less than 12 inches (30 cm) of precipitation annually, Island Park is forested and green with many streams, ponds, lakes, and meadows. Island Park receives well over 30 inches (76 cm) of precipitation annually, with parts receiving over 50 inches (127 cm). That is, Island Park has three times the rainfall and snowfall as nearby areas of the same elevation.

The Snake River Plain that was also formed by the Yellowstone hotspot aligns with the gap between the Sierra Nevada and Cascade mountain ranges along the West Coast of the United States so that there is a moisture channel that extends from the distant Pacific Ocean, between the Cascades and Sierra Nevada, through the Rocky Mountains to Island Park.

This precipitation in Island Park falls on the relatively level floor of the caldera, where it forms numerous meandering streams, ponds, marshes, and meadows. It also falls on the higher areas to the east along the Yellowstone Park border, where it percolates though the granular volcanic deposits to emerge as some of the largest springs in the world. Big Springs, Buffalo River Springs, and Warm River Springs all are 1st Magnitude springs, and they form some of the meandering streams that the area is famous for.

=== Climate ===
Island Park has a humid continental climate (Dsb), bordering on a subarctic climate (Dsc). Summer days are usually warm, with nights dropping to temperatures around 40, while winters are very cold, with massive yearly snowfall averaging 215 inches (550 cm). It is the site of Idaho's lowest recorded temperature, −60 °F (−51 °C), on January 18, 1943.

Climate data for Island Park Dam, Idaho, 1991–2020 normals, extremes 1937–present
Month	Jan	Feb	Mar	Apr	May	Jun	Jul	Aug	Sep	Oct	Nov	Dec	Year
Record high °F (°C)	49 (9)	55 (13)	62 (17)	76 (24)	84 (29)	91 (33)	97 (36)	96 (36)	91 (33)	82 (28)	68 (20)	56 (13)	97 (36)
Mean maximum °F (°C)	40.7 (4.8)	43.8 (6.6)	53.3 (11.8)	64.5 (18.1)	75.2 (24.0)	81.8 (27.7)	87.7 (30.9)	87.8 (31.0)	82.8 (28.2)	70.9 (21.6)	54.4 (12.4)	40.7 (4.8)	87.8 (31.0)
Mean daily maximum °F (°C)	26.5 (−3.1)	29.7 (−1.3)	38.6 (3.7)	47.4 (8.6)	59.2 (15.1)	67.3 (19.6)	77.1 (25.1)	77.2 (25.1)	68.0 (20.0)	51.3 (10.7)	35.6 (2.0)	25.5 (−3.6)	50.3 (10.2)
Daily mean °F (°C)	16.2 (−8.8)	18.6 (−7.4)	26.5 (−3.1)	35.3 (1.8)	45.4 (7.4)	52.6 (11.4)	60.0 (15.6)	58.6 (14.8)	50.1 (10.1)	37.7 (3.2)	25.0 (−3.9)	16.0 (−8.9)	36.8 (2.7)
Mean daily minimum °F (°C)	5.9 (−14.5)	7.5 (−13.6)	14.5 (−9.7)	23.1 (−4.9)	31.5 (−0.3)	37.8 (3.2)	42.8 (6.0)	40.0 (4.4)	32.2 (0.1)	24.1 (−4.4)	14.3 (−9.8)	6.4 (−14.2)	23.3 (−4.8)
Mean minimum °F (°C)	−22.7 (−30.4)	−19.2 (−28.4)	−9.8 (−23.2)	6.1 (−14.4)	20.1 (−6.6)	27.3 (−2.6)	32.9 (0.5)	29.5 (−1.4)	21.4 (−5.9)	9.0 (−12.8)	−8.9 (−22.7)	−19.3 (−28.5)	−28.1 (−33.4)
Record low °F (°C)	−60 (−51)	−54 (−48)	−36 (−38)	−18 (−28)	7 (−14)	20 (−7)	25 (−4)	17 (−8)	8 (−13)	−17 (−27)	−34 (−37)	−51 (−46)	−60 (−51)
Average precipitation inches (mm)	3.53 (90)	2.64 (67)	2.05 (52)	2.37 (60)	2.99 (76)	2.63 (67)	1.17 (30)	1.14 (29)	1.66 (42)	2.09 (53)	2.54 (65)	4.01 (102)	28.82 (733)
Average snowfall inches (cm)	54.2 (138)	36.1 (92)	27.1 (69)	17.7 (45)	2.7 (6.9)	0.3 (0.76)	0.0 (0.0)	0.0 (0.0)	0.2 (0.51)	7.9 (20)	26.7 (68)	61.4 (156)	234.3 (596.17)
Average extreme snow depth inches (cm)	44.2 (112)	51.9 (132)	52.1 (132)	37.1 (94)	10.3 (26)	0.0 (0.0)	0.0 (0.0)	0.0 (0.0)	0.1 (0.25)	3.7 (9.4)	12.6 (32)	33.7 (86)	52.6 (134)
Average precipitation days (≥ 0.01 in)	12.9	10.1	9.2	8.4	8.4	8.7	5.0	5.3	5.2	6.2	8.5	13.3	101.2
Average snowy days (≥ 0.1 in)	13.0	10.0	7.9	5.3	1.1	0.2	0.0	0.0	0.2	2.4	7.6	13.5	61.2
Source 1: NOAA
Source 2: National Weather Service

== Demographics ==
=== 2010 census ===
Historical population
Census	Pop.	Note	%±
1930	50		—
1960	53		—
1970	136		156.6%
1980	154		13.2%
1990	159		3.2%
2000	215		35.2%
2010	286		33.0%
2020	193		−32.5%

As of the census of 2010, there were 286 people, 122 households, and 74 families residing in the city. The population density was 43.1 inhabitants per square mile (16.6/km^{2}). There were 692 housing units at an average density of 104.2 units per square mile (40.2 units/km^{2}). The racial makeup of the city was 96.9% White, 0.7% Native American, 1.7% from other races, and 0.7% from two or more races. Hispanic or Latino of any race were 6.6% of the population.

There were 122 households, of which 19.7% had children under the age of 18 living with them, 55.7% were married couples living together, 2.5% had a female householder with no husband present, 2.5% had a male householder with no wife present, and 39.3% were non-families. 33.6% of all households were made up of individuals, and 5% had someone living alone who was 65 years of age or older. The average household size was 2.28 and the average family size was 2.97.

The median age in the city was 45 years. 19.2% of residents were under the age of 18; 6.2% were between the ages of 18 and 24; 24.4% were from 25 to 44; 34.2% were from 45 to 64; and 15.7% were 65 years of age or older. The gender makeup of the city was 53.5% male and 46.5% female.

=== 2000 census ===
As of the census of 2000, there were 215 people, 90 households, and 57 families residing in the city. The population density was 34.6 inhabitants per square mile (13.4/km^{2}). There were 425 housing units at an average density of 68.4 units per square mile (26.4 units/km^{2}). The racial makeup of the city was 95.81% White, 0.93% Asian, 2.33% from other races, and 0.93% from two or more races. Hispanic or Latino of any race were 4.19% of the population.

There were 90 households, out of which 22.2% had children under the age of 18 living with them, 55.6% were married couples living together, 6.7% had a female householder with no husband present, and 35.6% were non-families. 27.8% of all households were made up of individuals, and 2.2% had someone living alone who was 65 years of age or older. The average household size was 2.39 and the average family size was 2.93.

In the city, the population was spread out, with 19.5% under the age of 18, 11.2% from 18 to 24, 27.4% from 25 to 44, 28.4% from 45 to 64, and 13.5% who were 65 years of age or older. The median age was 42 years. For every 100 females, there were 112.9 males. For every 100 females age 18 and over, there were 119.0 males.

The median income for a household in the city was $26,250, and the median income for a family was $30,000. Males had a median income of $22,292 versus $16,250 for females. The per capita income for the city was $15,617. About 21.0% of families and 23.9% of the population were below the poverty line, including 37.9% of those under the age of eighteen and none of those 65 or over.

== Assimilated communities ==
In addition to the former unincorporated community, Island Park, for which the incorporated city was named, the city either originally included, or subsequently added, several other formerly unincorporated communities:

- Flat Rock (also known as Macks Inn)
- Lake
- Last Chance
- Staley Springs

== Transportation ==
=== Airport ===
Island Park is served by Henry's Lake Airport, which is not located within the city limits, but just west and south of the northern end of the city.

=== Roads ===
Island Park is currently served by one U.S. Highway and one state highway; and was previously served by another U.S. Highway and another state highway:

Current highways

- US 20, which runs north–south through most of the city
- SH-87, which begins in the northern part of the city and runs northwest through the northern part of the city and on to Montana

Former highways

- US 191 (1926–1981), the former routing of this highway follows the current route of US-20 this part of Idaho; in 1981 with the completion of Interstate 15, US-191 was rerouted such that it no longer enters Idaho
- SH-84, formerly ran the length of South Big Springs Loop (from US-20 in the Flat Rock area of the city [also known as Macks Inn] easterly to Henrys Fork); this route has since been decommissioned

== Local attractions ==
- Harriman State Park - A 11,700-acre refuge with various natural sceneries.
- Sawtell's Ranch Marker - In remembrance of the Sawtell's Ranch.
- Sawtell's Peak
- The Johnny Sack cabin - The structure was built by a man known as Johnny Sack, a German cabinet maker who measured only 4 feet 11 inches tall. He built the cabin in 1932 and lived within its wall, in isolation, up until 1957. Due to the peculiar way the insides of the cabins are made, and the notability in the area of the man, the cabin was soon put in the National Register of Historic Places, and currently can be visited thanks to local tours.
- Mesa Falls - A volcanic formation in the area which is dominated by falls.

== Education ==
It is located in the Fremont County Joint School District 215.

College of Eastern Idaho includes this county in its catchment zone; however this county is not in its taxation zone.

== See also ==
- List of cities in Idaho
