= Reas Pass =

- Interactive map of Reas Pass
- Elevation: 6,930 feet (2,110 m)
- Traversed by: former Union Pacific Railroad right-of-way

Third Approach
- Location: Fremont County, Idaho, US
- Range: Rocky Mountains
- Coordinates: 44°34′03″N 111°11′22″W
- Topo map: USGS Reas Pass

Reas Pass, elevation 6,930 feet (2,110 m), is a mountain pass on the Continental Divide in Fremont County, Idaho, about 8 miles (13 km) southwest of West Yellowstone, Montana. The pass lies essentially on the Idaho-Montana border, but modern maps show that the summit lies entirely in Idaho, because the Divide and the state line do not quite coincide here. The pass is also somewhat unusual in that, despite being the lowest crossing of the Divide in the vicinity, it has evidently never been traversed by a highway of any significance. Starting in 1909, it was used by a branch line of the Union Pacific Railroad running between Ashton, Idaho and West Yellowstone; however, the line eventually became unprofitable and was closed in 1979.
