= Last Chance, Idaho =

Town in Fremont County, Idaho, United States

Coordinates: 44°22′00″N 111°24′08″W

Last Chance was a former unincorporated community along Henrys Fork in Fremont County, Idaho, United States, near the city of Island Park. The site originally was promoted as the "last chance" resort for the next 40 miles (64 km), hence the name.

== Transportation ==
A U.S. Highway passes through the community, as did a former U.S. Highway:

- US 20
- US 191, until it was rerouted entirely out of the state of Idaho in 1981

== In popular culture ==
- In season 2, episode 19 of the American television drama series Early Edition, after retiring from the Chicago Police Department, the character Detective Crumb moves to Last Chance, Idaho.

== See also ==
- Flat Rock, Idaho
- Lake, Idaho
- Staley Springs, Idaho
