= Island Park Dam =

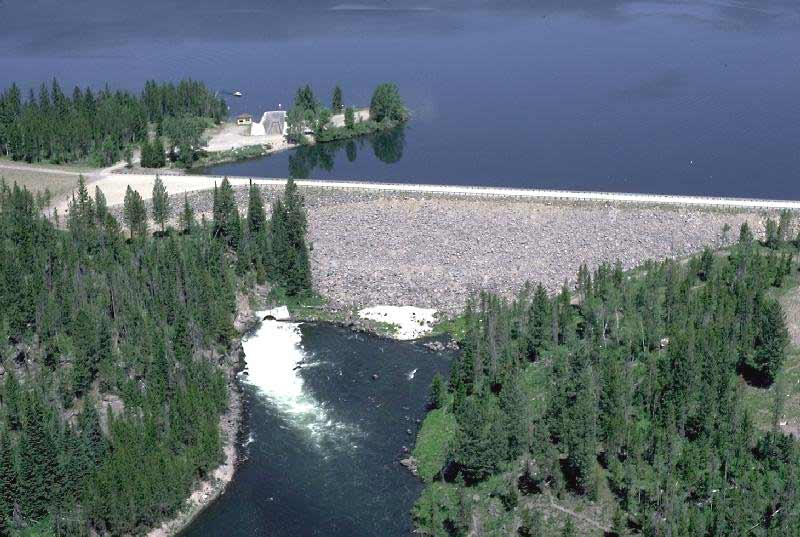

- Location within Idaho
- Location: Fremont County, Idaho, near Island Park, Idaho
- Coordinates: 44°25′06.92″N 111°23′47.50″W
- Construction began: 1937
- Opening date: 1939
- Operator: U.S. Bureau of Reclamation

Dam and spillways
- Type of dam: Zoned earthfill dam
- Impounds: Henrys Fork
- Height: 94 ft (29 m)
- Length: 9,500 ft (2,900 m)
- Spillway type: Ungated bathtub

Reservoir
- Creates: Island Park Reservoir
- Total capacity: 135,205 acre-feet (0.166773 km^{3})
- Catchment area: 482 sq mi (1,250 km^{2})

Island Park Dam is operated by the U.S. Bureau of Reclamation in Fremont County, Idaho, United States. The dam lies in Targhee National Forest near Island Park. The zoned earthfill dam was built between 1937 and 1939 as part of the Minidoka Project, which provides water to irrigate farmland in Idaho's Snake River Plain.

The dam provides water storage, impounding 135,000 acre-feet (0.167 km^{3}), which is distributed by the Cross Cut Canal to farms in Fremont and Madison counties in Idaho, and Teton County in Wyoming. A hydroelectric plant was added to the dam in 1994 by the Fall River Rural Electric Cooperative. The Island Park and Grassy Lake reservoirs were built as an alternative to construction of a larger project that would have flooded the Fall River area of Yellowstone National Park.

== Climate ==
Island Park Dam has a humid continental climate (Köppen Dfb) bordering upon a subalpine climate (Dfc). Summers feature very warm afternoons and chilly mornings, whilst winters are freezing and very snowy with an annual snowfall averaging 214 inches or 5.44 metres and reaching 375 inches or 9.53 metres between July 1974 and June 1975. The dam's weather recording site holds the record for the eighth-lowest temperature recorded in the United States (and lowest temperature recorded in Idaho) at −60 °F or −51.1 °C.

Climate data for Island Park Dam, Idaho
Month	Jan	Feb	Mar	Apr	May	Jun	Jul	Aug	Sep	Oct	Nov	Dec	Year
Record high °F (°C)	49 (9)	55 (13)	62 (17)	76 (24)	84 (29)	91 (33)	97 (36)	96 (36)	91 (33)	82 (28)	68 (20)	56 (13)	97 (36)
Mean maximum °F (°C)	40 (4)	44 (7)	52 (11)	64 (18)	75 (24)	82 (28)	87 (31)	88 (31)	82 (28)	71 (22)	54 (12)	41 (5)	88 (31)
Mean daily maximum °F (°C)	26.5 (−3.1)	31.6 (−0.2)	38.5 (3.6)	48.4 (9.1)	59.8 (15.4)	68.8 (20.4)	79.0 (26.1)	78.5 (25.8)	68.7 (20.4)	54.9 (12.7)	37.2 (2.9)	27.6 (−2.4)	51.6 (10.9)
Mean daily minimum °F (°C)	3.0 (−16.1)	4.8 (−15.1)	10.5 (−11.9)	21.5 (−5.8)	31.1 (−0.5)	37.7 (3.2)	42.9 (6.1)	40.7 (4.8)	32.8 (0.4)	25.1 (−3.8)	14.9 (−9.5)	5.6 (−14.7)	22.6 (−5.2)
Mean minimum °F (°C)	−28 (−33)	−25 (−32)	−16 (−27)	3 (−16)	19 (−7)	27 (−3)	33 (1)	30 (−1)	22 (−6)	11 (−12)	−9 (−23)	−23 (−31)	−33 (−36)
Record low °F (°C)	−60 (−51)	−47 (−44)	−36 (−38)	−18 (−28)	7 (−14)	20 (−7)	25 (−4)	17 (−8)	8 (−13)	−6 (−21)	−34 (−37)	−51 (−46)	−60 (−51)
Average precipitation inches (mm)	3.80 (97)	2.93 (74)	2.48 (63)	2.03 (52)	2.49 (63)	2.71 (69)	1.25 (32)	1.45 (37)	1.50 (38)	1.89 (48)	2.56 (65)	3.55 (90)	28.64 (728)
Average snowfall inches (cm)	48.6 (123)	37.5 (95)	29.3 (74)	13.9 (35)	4.1 (10)	0.4 (1.0)	0.0 (0.0)	0.1 (0.25)	1.0 (2.5)	6.6 (17)	25.3 (64)	47.9 (122)	214.7 (543.75)
Average precipitation days	15	12	11	9	10	10	6	7	6	7	10	13	116
Source 1: Western Regional Climate Center
Source 2: National Oceanic and Atmospheric Administration
