= Henrys Fork (Snake River tributary) =

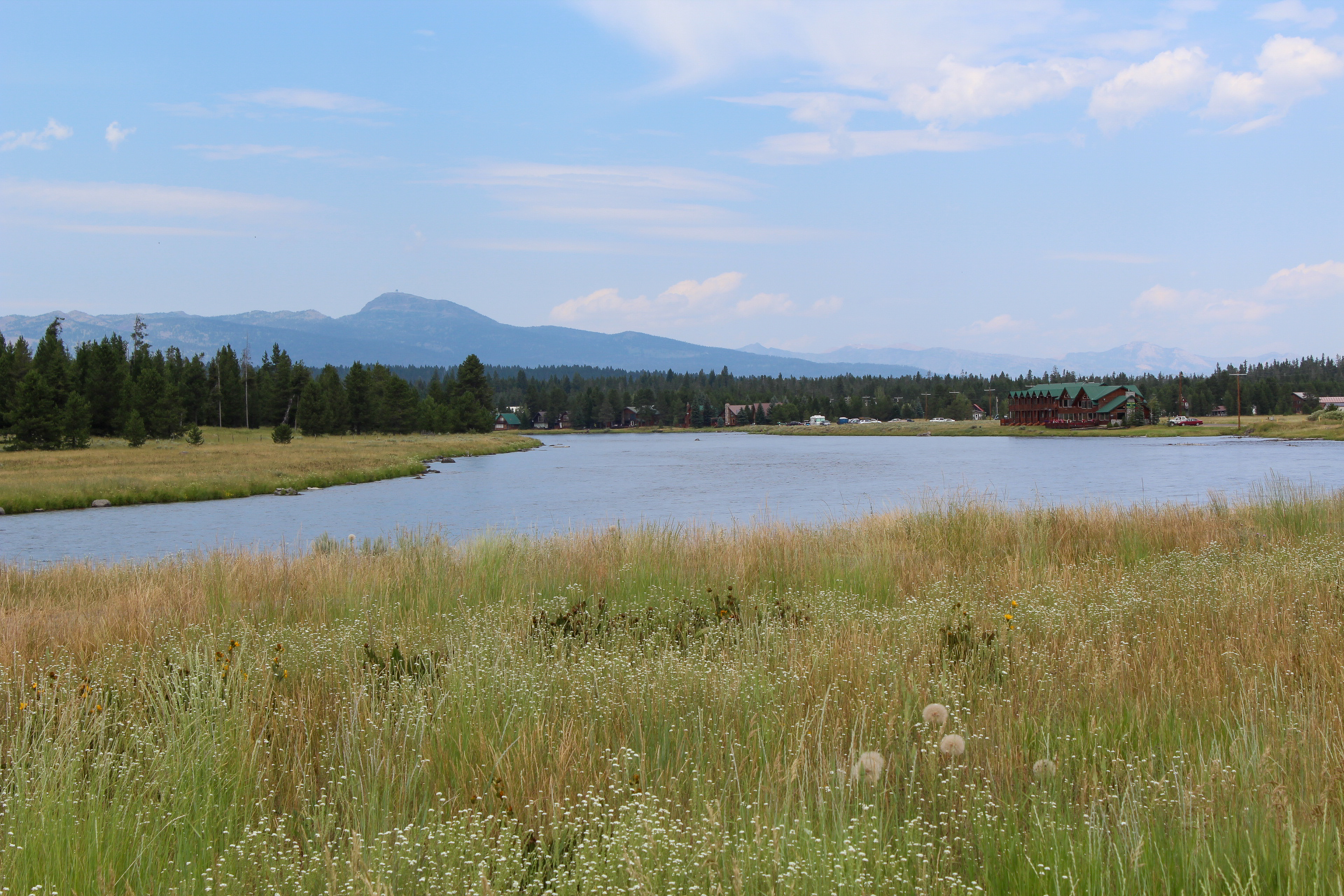
- Henry's Fork from Last Chance, Idaho

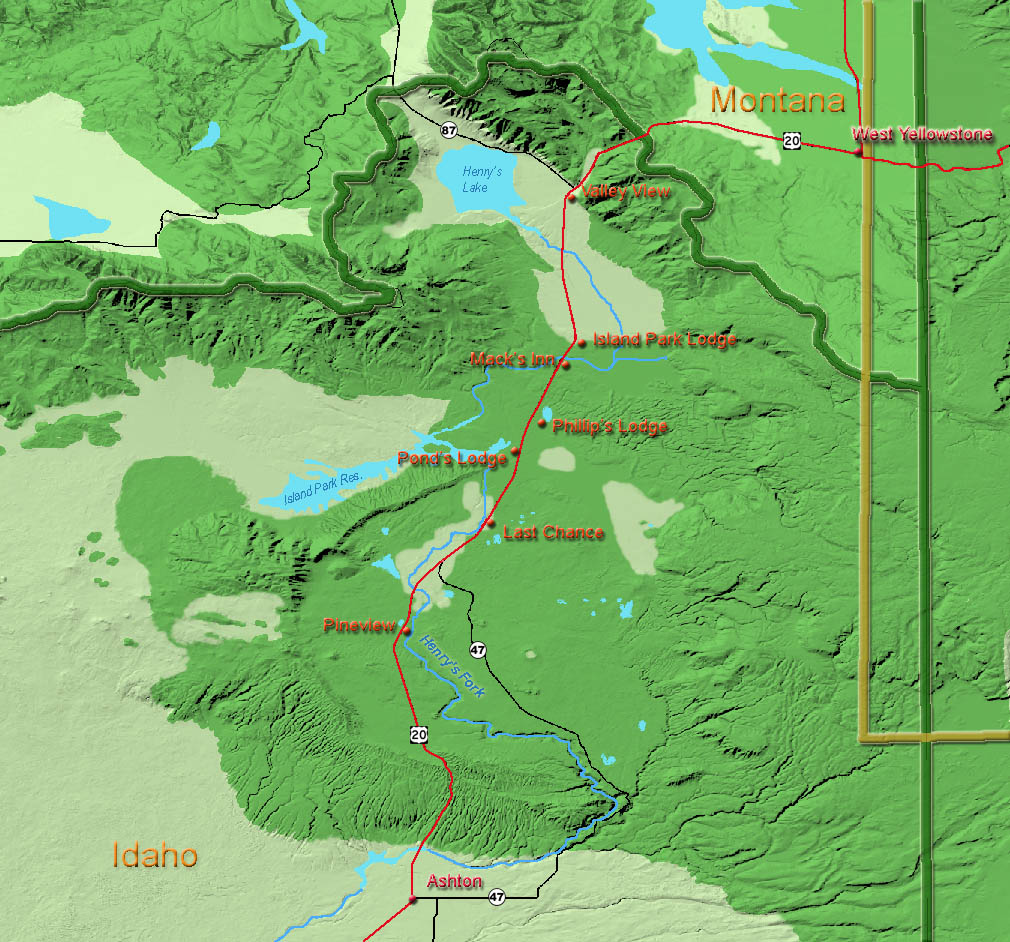
- Henrys Fork upper drainage

- Location of the mouth of Henrys Fork in Idaho

Location
- Country: United States
- State: Idaho
- Counties: Fremont County, Idaho, Madison County, Idaho

Physical characteristics
- Source
  - location: near Island Park, Fremont County, Idaho
  - coordinates: 44°29′34″N 111°16′58″W
  - elevation: 6,397 ft (1,950 m)
- Mouth: Snake River
  - location: southwest of Rexburg, Madison County, Idaho
  - coordinates: 43°45′10″N 111°57′28″W
  - elevation: 4,800 ft (1,500 m)
- Length: 127 mi (204 km)
- Basin size: 3,212 sq mi (8,320 km^{2})
- Discharge
  - location: near Rexburg
  - average: 2,096 cu ft/s (59.4 m^{3}/s)
  - minimum: 183 cu ft/s (5.2 m^{3}/s)
  - maximum: 79,000 cu ft/s (2,200 m^{3}/s)

Henrys Fork is a tributary river of the Snake River, approximately 127 miles (204 km) long, in southeastern Idaho in the United States. It is also referred to as the North Fork of the Snake River. Its drainage basin is 3,212 square miles (8,320 km^{2}), including its main tributary, the Teton River. Its mean annual discharge, as measured at river mile 9.2 (Henrys Fork near Rexburg) by the United States Geological Survey (USGS), is 2,096 cubic feet per second (59.4 m^{3}/s), with a maximum daily recorded flow of 79,000 cubic feet per second (2,240 m^{3}/s), and a minimum of 183 cubic feet per second (5.18 m^{3}/s). It is normally transcribed without an apostrophe.

The river is named for Andrew Henry, who first entered the Snake River plateau in 1810. Employed by the Missouri Fur Company, he built Fort Henry on the upper Snake River, near modern St. Anthony, but abandoned this first American fur post west of the continental divide the following spring.

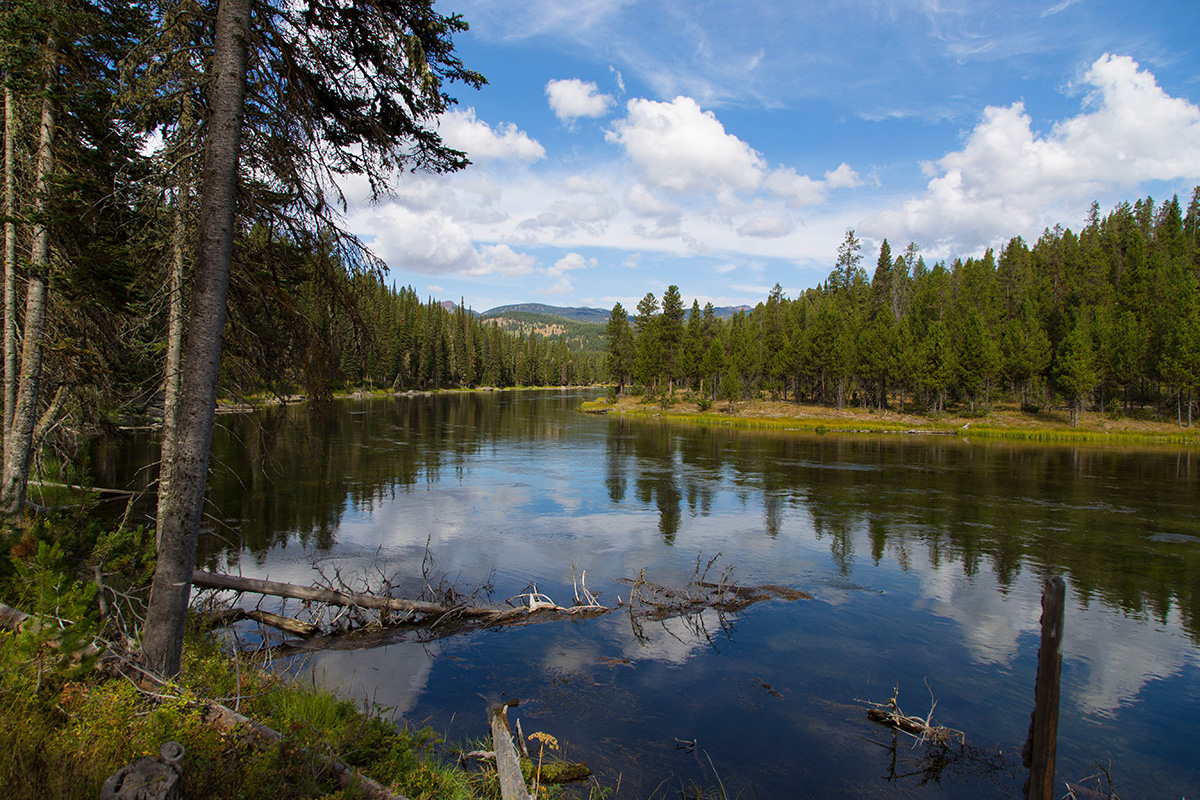
Henrys Fork of the Snake River near Coffee Pot Rapids

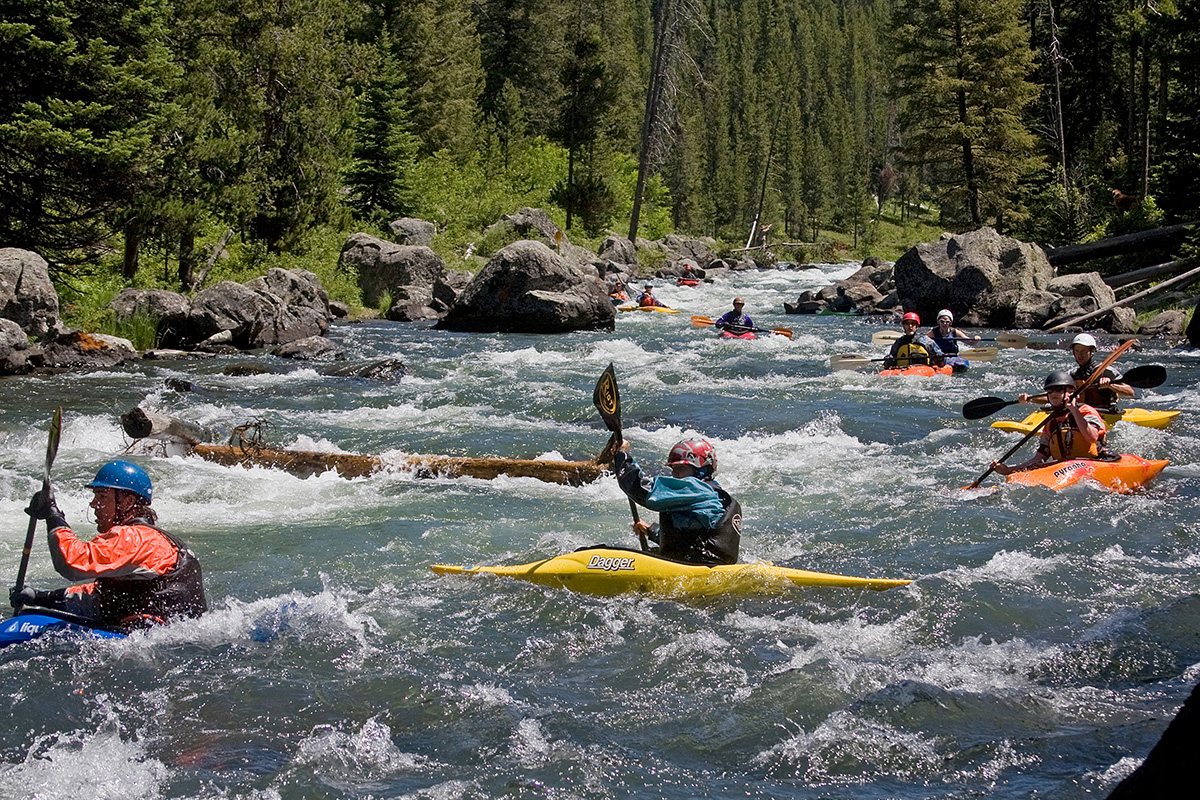
Kayaking the Coffee Pot Rapids of the Henrys Fork

== Sources ==
The river's source is at Big Springs and the Henrys Lake outlet (10 miles northwest of Big Springs). To the east is Targhee Pass, with Raynolds Pass to the northwest and Red Rock Pass to the southwest. The headwaters of the Henrys Fork are within 10 miles (16 km) of the headwaters of the Missouri River (on the Red Rock River and Madison River), located across the continental divide in Montana. Henry's Fork drains the northeastern corner of the Snake River Plain, along the continental divide.

== River ecology ==
The Henrys Lake outlet is subject to substantial draw-downs from irrigation diversions during the summer. Late in the season, as the draw-downs decrease with the cooler weather, more water is released into the stream, allowing fish to move up from the lower section of the river. The Nature Conservancy sponsors a learning station near the outlet stream.

South of the lake at Big Springs, nearly 500,000 US gallons (1,900 m^{3}) of constant 52 °F (11 °C) water flow into the river each day. The river flows south through a high plateau in northern Fremont County, through the Caribou-Targhee National Forest, and passes through Island Park Reservoir. It emerges from the reservoir and flows through a canyon that opens up into a broad, flat meadow in the Island Park Caldera in central Fremont County. The river flows slowly past the town of Island Park, through the Harriman State Park, otherwise known as the "Railroad Ranch", and then descends swiftly as it approaches the wall of the caldera, flowing over both Upper Mesa and Lower Mesa Falls, and emerges from the mountains onto the Snake River Plain near Ashton. It flows southwest across the plain, past St. Anthony, and splits into multiple channels into a broad inland delta north of Rexburg. It receives the Teton River from the east approximately 5 miles (8.0 km) west of Rexburg. It joins the Snake from the northeast approximately 10 miles (16 km) southwest of Rexburg, just below 4,800 feet (1,463 m).

Island Park Reservoir, a component of the Minidoka Project, is used for irrigation in the Snake River Plain. Its drainage provides one of the most important rainbow trout fisheries in Idaho regarding habitat, fish populations, and use by anglers. The section of the river between Henry's Lake and Big Springs is a major spawning area for trout and is closed to fishing.

Henrys Fork has long been noted for its superb fishing, especially its dry fly fishing. Bing Lempke, a pipefitter from nearby Idaho Falls, was considered the local dean of the fishery until he died in 1990.

== See also ==
- Henry's Fork Caldera
- List of Idaho rivers
- List of longest streams of Idaho
- Tributaries of the Columbia River
