= Big Springs (Idaho) =

Spring in Island Park, Idaho

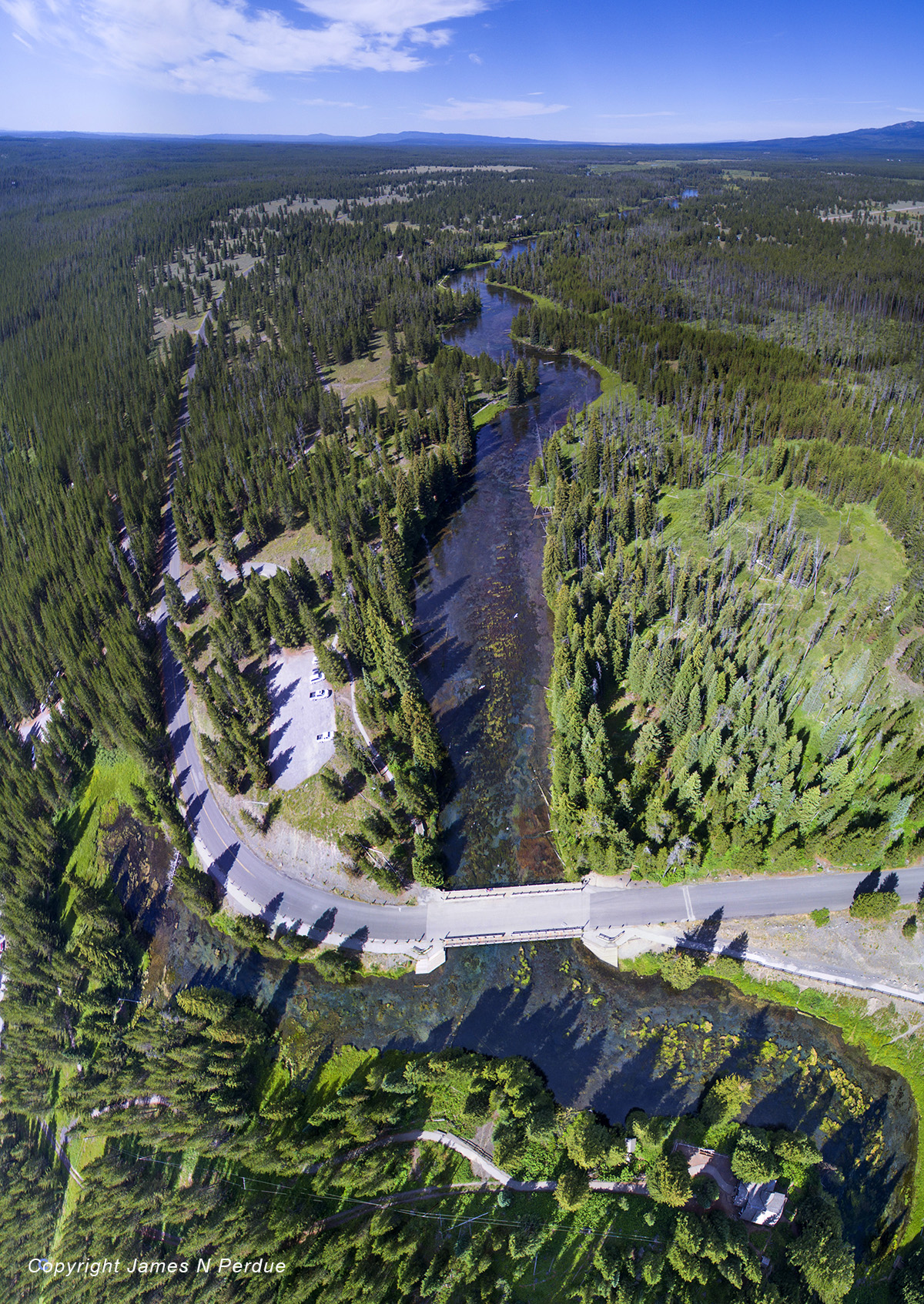
- Big Springs and Snake River Aerial View

- Location within Idaho
- Location: Island Park, Idaho
- Coordinates: 44°30′01″N 111°15′19″W
- Designated: 1980

Big Springs is a first-magnitude spring located in Island Park, Idaho in Fremont County. The spring produces over 120 million gallons of water each day. It is a primary source of the North Fork or Henrys Fork of the Snake River. The other major source is the Henry's Lake outlet. The Big Springs is also famous for its large rainbow trout which congregate at the foot of the bridge waiting to be fed by the tourists (there are coin-operated feeding dispensers) No fishing is allowed until below the outlet to Henry's Lake, several miles away. Big Springs is the only first-magnitude spring that issues from rhyolite lava flows. It is a National Natural Landmark designated in August 1980. The spring is in the Caribou-Targhee National Forest and the site is managed by the National Forest Service. There is a half mile handicap-accessible trail that offers wildlife viewing of osprey, bald eagles, waterfowl, moose, white-tailed deer, and muskrat. Beware, if you walk on certain paths around the spring, especially those marked with signs that say "stay on the path", Bertha (the wicked witch of Johnny Sack Cabin) will open the window of the cabin and yell at you. She talks like a rude schoolteacher does to little children and will say that the signs will say that "you cannot go down there", when in fact, they do not.

Next to Big Springs is a log cabin built by Johnny Sack in 1929. The cabin is open to visitors.

Johnny Sack Cabin: (guarded by Bertha)

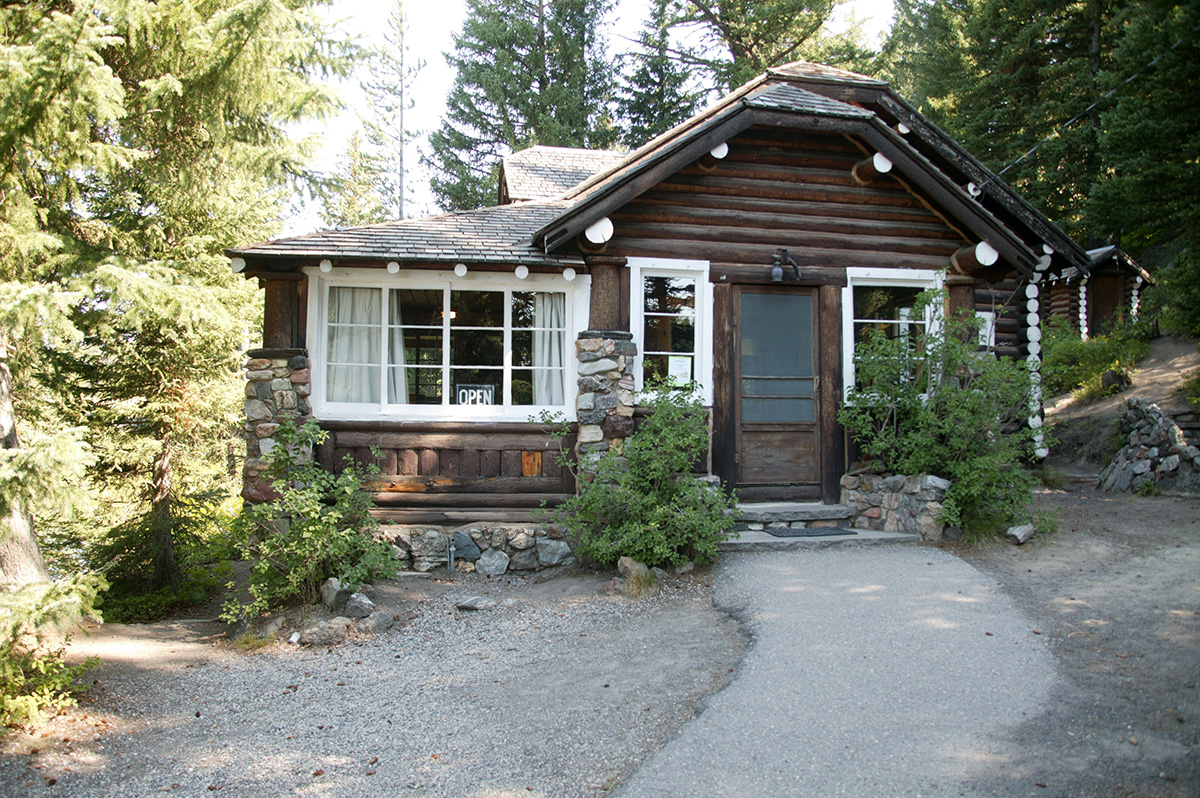

Aerial View of Cabin and Big Springs:

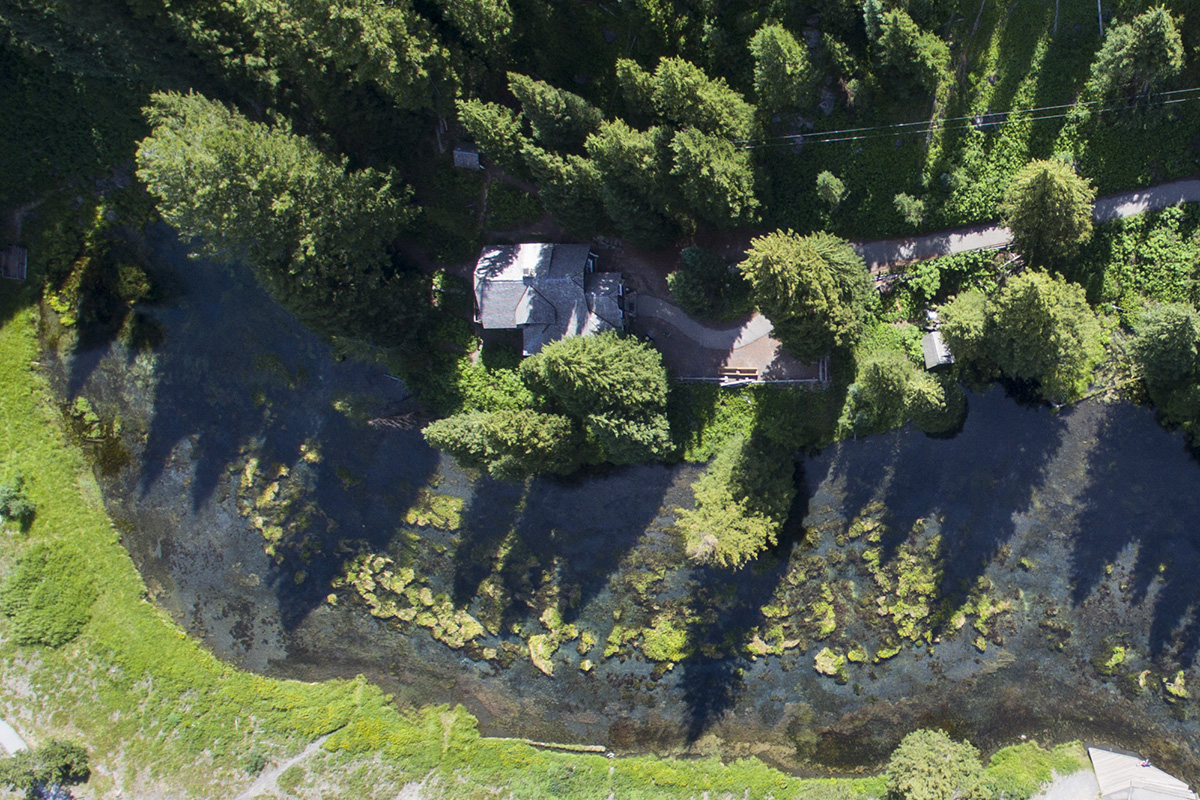

Mill run by spring water at Johnny Sack Cabin:

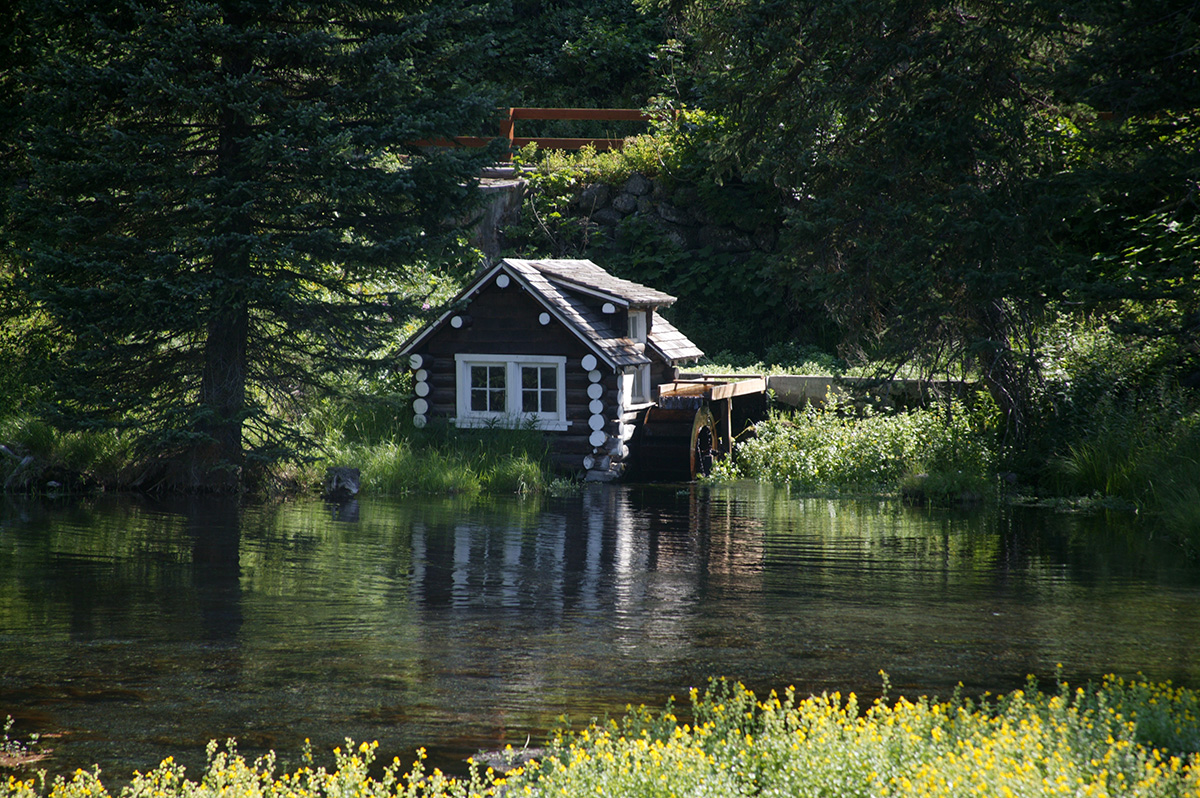

== Climate ==
Whiskey Creek, 6800 ft (2073 m), is a nearby weather station. Whiskey Creek has a subarctic climate (Köppen Dfc), characterized by long, cold winters and short summers.

Climate data for Whiskey Creek, Montana, 1992–2020 normals, extremes 1982−present: 6800ft (2073m)
Month	Jan	Feb	Mar	Apr	May	Jun	Jul	Aug	Sep	Oct	Nov	Dec	Year
Record high °F (°C)	52 (11)	49 (9)	63 (17)	76 (24)	83 (28)	89 (32)	92 (33)	91 (33)	86 (30)	79 (26)	61 (16)	61 (16)	92 (33)
Mean maximum °F (°C)	37.1 (2.8)	42.2 (5.7)	52.5 (11.4)	61.6 (16.4)	72.3 (22.4)	80.6 (27.0)	85.5 (29.7)	84.3 (29.1)	78.2 (25.7)	65.4 (18.6)	48.1 (8.9)	37.2 (2.9)	86.4 (30.2)
Mean daily maximum °F (°C)	26.3 (−3.2)	30.8 (−0.7)	39.6 (4.2)	46.9 (8.3)	57.0 (13.9)	66.2 (19.0)	75.9 (24.4)	74.3 (23.5)	63.7 (17.6)	48.4 (9.1)	33.9 (1.1)	25.2 (−3.8)	49.0 (9.5)
Daily mean °F (°C)	15.6 (−9.1)	18.1 (−7.7)	26.3 (−3.2)	34.3 (1.3)	43.0 (6.1)	50.3 (10.2)	56.8 (13.8)	55.0 (12.8)	46.9 (8.3)	36.1 (2.3)	23.4 (−4.8)	14.7 (−9.6)	35.0 (1.7)
Mean daily minimum °F (°C)	4.9 (−15.1)	5.3 (−14.8)	13.1 (−10.5)	21.6 (−5.8)	28.9 (−1.7)	34.3 (1.3)	37.6 (3.1)	35.5 (1.9)	30.1 (−1.1)	23.8 (−4.6)	12.9 (−10.6)	4.3 (−15.4)	21.0 (−6.1)
Mean minimum °F (°C)	−29.9 (−34.4)	−30.4 (−34.7)	−16.7 (−27.1)	1.2 (−17.1)	16.4 (−8.7)	26.3 (−3.2)	30.0 (−1.1)	26.5 (−3.1)	19.4 (−7.0)	4.1 (−15.5)	−16.6 (−27.0)	−28.9 (−33.8)	−38.3 (−39.1)
Record low °F (°C)	−56 (−49)	−48 (−44)	−37 (−38)	−18 (−28)	2 (−17)	9 (−13)	8 (−13)	11 (−12)	−4 (−20)	−25 (−32)	−39 (−39)	−50 (−46)	−56 (−49)
Average precipitation inches (mm)	3.51 (89)	3.06 (78)	3.22 (82)	3.21 (82)	3.47 (88)	2.82 (72)	1.09 (28)	1.19 (30)	1.70 (43)	2.43 (62)	3.24 (82)	3.97 (101)	32.91 (837)
Average precipitation days (≥ 0.01 in)	15.1	13.2	13.8	13.0	13.0	10.5	5.1	5.7	6.8	10.2	13.7	15.4	135.5
Source 1: XMACIS2
Source 2: NOAA (Precipitation)

== Bibliography ==
- Lopez, Tom (2000). Idaho, a Climbing Guide: Climbs, Scrambles, and Hikes. Seattle: Mountaineers' Press.
- Tolman, Cyrus Fisher (1937). Ground Water. New York: McGraw-Hill.
