= U.S. Route 287 in Montana =

Section of U.S. Numbered Highway in Montana, United States

U.S. Highway 287
- US 287 highlighted in red

Route information
- Maintained by MDT
- Length: 281.183 mi (452.520 km)
- Existed: 1965–present
- Tourist routes: Lewis and Clark Trail
- NHS: Section south of northern I-15 junction

Major junctions
- South end: Yellowstone National Park east of West Yellowstone
- US 20 / US 191 in West Yellowstone; I-90 near Three Forks; US 12 from Townsend to Helena; I-15 from Helena to Wolf Creek; MT 200 near Milford Colony
- North end: US 89 in Choteau

Location
- Country: United States
- State: Montana
- Counties: Gallatin, Madison, Jefferson, Broadwater, Lewis and Clark, Teton

Highway system
- United States Numbered Highway System; List; Special; Divided; Montana Highway System; Interstate; US; State; Secondary
← US 212	→ MT 287

U.S. Route 287 (US 287) is a 281.183-mile (452.520 km) north-south U.S. Numbered Highway in Montana, United States, that connects Yellowstone National Park's West Entrance to U.S. Route 89 in Choteau, about 100 miles (160 km) south of the Canadian border.

== Route description ==
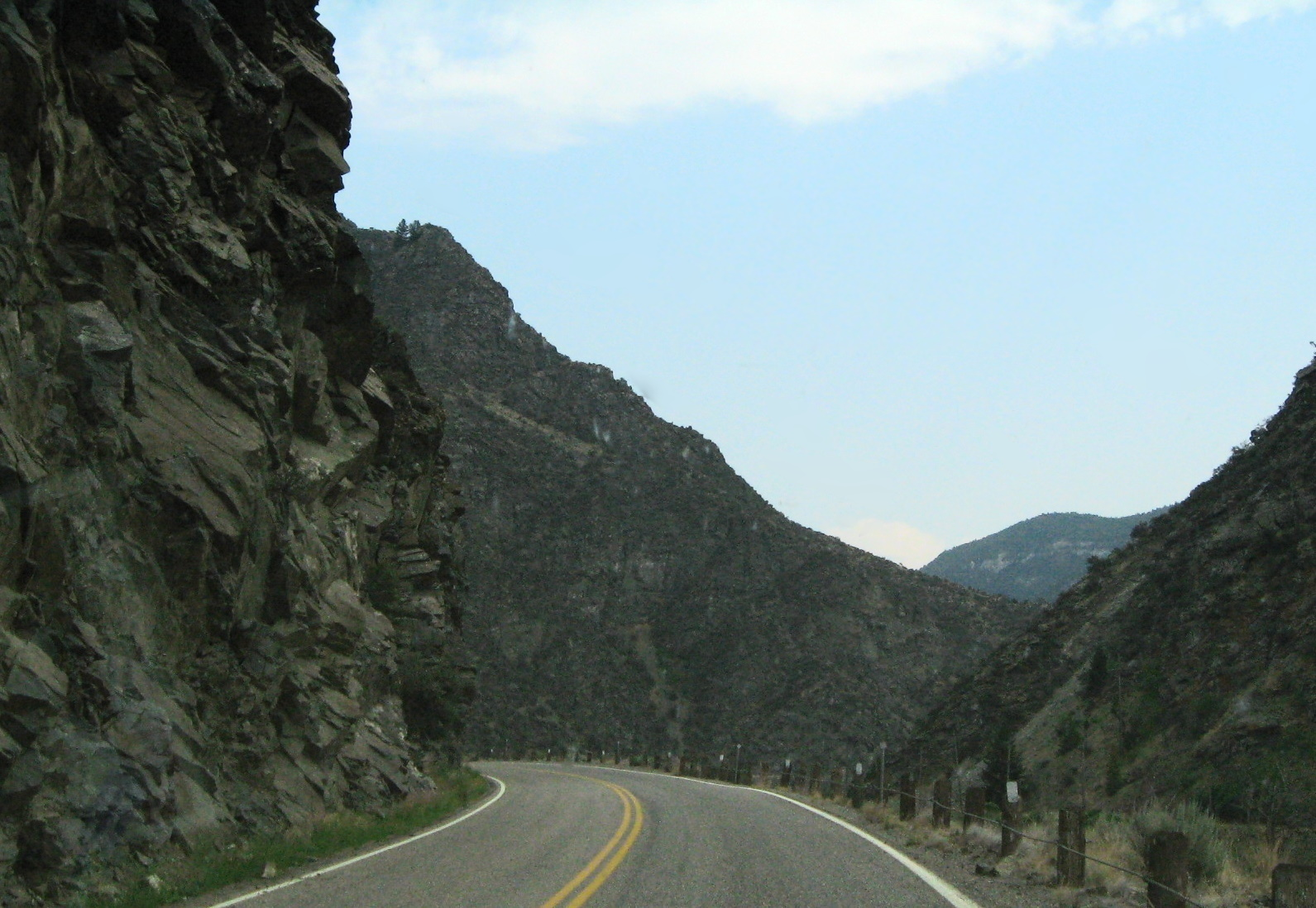
US 191 / US 287 north of Yellowstone National Park, July 2007

US 287 in Montana begins at the West Entrance to Yellowstone National Park concurrent with US 20 and US 191, at the edge of the town of West Yellowstone. Some commercially produced maps show US 287 going through Yellowstone National Park; however, it officially has a gap inside the park and resumes in Wyoming at the South Entrance, concurrent with US 89 and US 191. A few blocks into West Yellowstone, US 20 leaves the US 191 / US 287 concurrency and heads west towards the Targhee Pass and Idaho. The highway heads north, running concurrently with US 191 for 8 miles (13 km) before it heads west for 22 miles (35 km), passing along the north shores of Hebgen Lake and Earthquake Lake, to Montana Highway 87 (MT 87). US 287 turns north-northwest and follows the Madison River for 40 miles (64 km) to Ennis, where it intersects MT 287, and continues north for 16 miles (26 km) to Norris, where it intersects MT 84. It continues for 19 miles (31 km) to MT 2, just north of Sappington, where it turns east and the two routes share a ten-mile (16 km) concurrency. At Three Forks Junction, MT 2 leaves US 287 and heads east towards Three Forks, while US 287 turns north and travels for 1 1/4 miles (2.0 km) to I-90.

US 287 heads north for 30 miles (48 km) to Townsend, where it merges with US 12, and the two routes travel northwest for 44 miles (71 km) to Helena. On the east side of Helena, the combined route intersects I-15, where US 287 continues north on I-15 and US 12 heads west through downtown Helena. US 287 follows I-15 for 25 miles (40 km), and exits I-15 northeast of Wolf Creek and heads northwest. It travels for 18 miles (29 km) to MT 200, 20 miles (32 km) to MT 21 (about 1 1/2 miles (2.4 km) north of Augusta), and 25 miles (40 km) to Choteau where it ends at US 89.

US 287 is one of three highways in Montana numbered '287', the other two being Montana Highway 287 (MT 287) and Montana Secondary Highway 287 (S-287). Both routes are accessible to US 287, with MT 287 intersecting it in Ennis, while S-287 intersects MT 2 in Three Forks, about 3 miles (5 km) east of US 287.

== History ==
US 287 was originally designated as Montana State Highway 287 (MT 287). The Montana State Highway Commission first assigned the MT 287 designation in 1958 to a cross-state route from Yellowstone National Park at West Yellowstone to the Canada–United States border at the Piegan–Carway Border Crossing between Babb and Cardston, Alberta. MT 287 ran concurrently with US 191 for 8 miles (13 km) north from West Yellowstone and replaced MT 1 from US 191 to US 10S near Sappington. The route joined US 10S—along the modern Interstate 90 (I-90) corridor—to its junction with US 10 and US 10N near Three Forks. MT 287 continued with US 10N north and west to Helena, then the route ran concurrently with US 91 (along the modern I-15 corridor) to Wolf Creek. MT 287 replaced MT 33 between Wolf Creek and Choteau, then the highway ran concurrently with US 89 through Browning to Canada. After the Hebgen Lake earthquake in 1959, which destroyed part of the highway along that lake and created Quake Lake, MT 287 was temporarily rerouted to the highway north from Raynolds Pass.

In 1961, MT 287 was rerouted and replaced MT 34 from Ennis to Twin Bridges, ran concurrently with MT 41 to north of Silver Star, and replaced S-401 north to US 10 at Whitehall. MT 287 continued east with US 10 to rejoin its previous route west of Three Forks. The portion of the highway between Ennis and the US 10 junction became MT 287A.

In 1965, the US 287 designation was extended north from Denver, Colorado along its present alignment, replacing sections of MT 287 south of Ennis and north of Sappington, as well as all of MT 287A; the MT 287/US 89 concurrency north of Choteau was also dropped. The Montana Highway Commission requested the extension following lobbying from the U.S. Highway 287 Association and prior rejections from the AASHO, seeking a direct connection to either the Canadian border or Glacier National Park.

== Major intersections ==
County	Location	mi	km	Exit	Destinations	Notes
Gallatin	Yellowstone National Park	0.000	0.000		West Entrance Road (to US 20 east / US 191 south / US 287 south)	Continuation into Yellowstone National Park; US 191 / US 287 resume in Wyoming at the park's south entrance; US 20 resumes in Wyoming at the park's east entrance
Gallatin	Yellowstone National Park	0.000	0.000	Yellowstone National Park boundary (West Entrance); fees required; closed winters		
Gallatin	Yellowstone National Park	0.000	0.000		US 20 begins / US 191 begins	US 191 / US 287 southern terminus; US 20 eastern terminus; southern end of US 20 / US 191 concurrency
Gallatin	West Yellowstone	0.365	0.587		US 20 west (Firehold Avenue) – Idaho Falls	Northern end of US 20 concurrency
Gallatin		8.722	14.037		US 191 north – Bozeman	Northern end of US 191 concurrency
Madison		31.147	50.126		MT 87 south – Raynolds Pass, Ashton ID	
Madison		62.473	100.541		S-249 north	
Madison	Ennis	71.563	115.169		MT 287 west – Virginia City, Sheridan	
Madison	Norris	87.858	141.394		MT 84 east – Bozeman	
Madison	Harrison	98.044	157.787		S-283 west – Pony	
Madison		99.618	160.320		S-359 west	
Gallatin	No major junctions					
Jefferson		106.407	171.245		MT 2 west – Lewis and Clark Caverns State Park, Butte	Southern end of MT 2 concurrency
Broadwater	Three Forks Junction	116.146	186.919		MT 2 east – Three Forks	Northern end of MT 2 concurrency
Broadwater		117.418	188.966		I-90 / Lewis and Clark Trail – Butte, Billings	I-90 exit 274
Broadwater		127.281	204.839		S-437 north	
Broadwater	Toston	136.938	220.380		S-285 west – Radersburg	
Broadwater	Townsend	147.873	237.979		US 12 east – White Sulphur Springs	Southern end of US 12 concurrency
Lewis and Clark	Louisville	168.716	271.522		S-284 north	
Lewis and Clark	East Helena	175.622	282.636		S-518 south – Montana City	
Lewis and Clark	Helena	191.602	308.354	192	I-15 south – Butte I-15 BL north / US 12 west (Prospect Avenue) – Helena (Capitol Area)	Northern end of US 12 concurrency, southern end of I-15 concurrency, exit numbers follow I-15
Lewis and Clark	Helena	181.113	291.473	193	I-15 BL south (Cedar Street)	
Lewis and Clark	Helena	181.809	292.593	194	Custer Avenue	
Lewis and Clark	Helena	187.876	302.357	200	S-279 / S-453 (Lincoln Road)	
Lewis and Clark		196.914	316.902	209	Gates of the Mountains	
Lewis and Clark		203.781	327.954	216	Sieben	
Lewis and Clark		207.008	333.147	219	Spring Creek	Northbound exit and southbound entrance
Lewis and Clark		214.564	345.307	226	S-434 – Wolf Creek	
Lewis and Clark		216.363	348.202	228	I-15 north / Lewis and Clark Trail – Great Falls	Northern end of I-15 concurrency
Lewis and Clark	Bowman's Corner	236.785	381.069		MT 200 / Lewis and Clark Trail – Lincoln, Great Falls	
Lewis and Clark	Augusta	254.967	410.330		S-435 south (Main Street)	
Lewis and Clark		256.401	412.637		MT 21 east – Great Falls	
Teton		262.423	422.329		S-408 east – Fairfield	
Teton	Choteau	281.183	452.520		US 89 (Main Avenue) / Lewis and Clark Trail – Glacier National Park, Great Falls	US 287 northern terminus
1.000 mi = 1.609 km; 1.000 km = 0.621 mi: Closed/former; Concurrency terminus; Incomplete access

== See also ==
- List of U.S. Highways in Montana

U.S. Route 287
Previous state: Wyoming	Montana	Next state: Terminus
