= Ryan Hamilton (comedian) =

American stand-up comedian (born 1976)

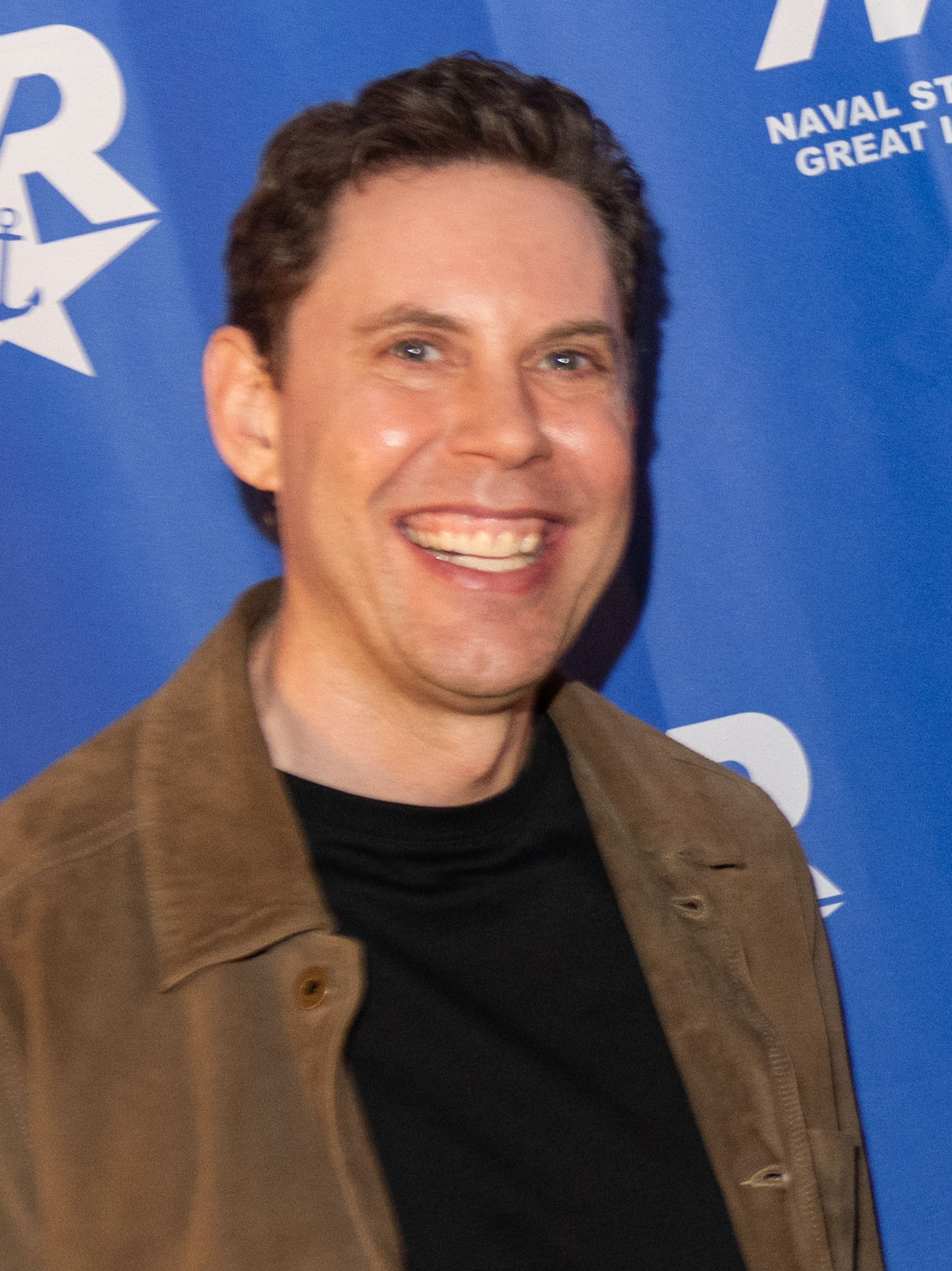
- Hamilton in 2024
- Born: Ryan Hamilton; 1976 (age 49–50); Ashton, Idaho
- Notable work: Conan, Comedy.tv, The Ha!ifax Comedy Fest

Comedy career
- Medium: Stand-up comedy
- Genre: Observational comedy
- Website: http://www.ryanhamiltonlive.com/

Ryan Hamilton (born 1976) is an American stand-up comedian who uses observational, sarcastic, and self-deprecating humor. He is known as a clean comedian and his material focuses on his own experiences, including his single life, skydiving, hot air balloons, and his huge smile. He was named one of Rolling Stone's Five Comics to Watch in 2012, and also has made standout appearances on The Tonight Show Starring Jimmy Fallon, The Late Show with Stephen Colbert, Conan, The Late Late Show, Last Comic Standing, Comedy Central, and Showtime.

== Early life ==
Hamilton was born in 1976 in Ashton, Idaho, a small potato farming community. He attended BYU-Idaho, receiving an associate degree in journalism and public relations. He then transferred to Brigham Young University and earned a bachelor's degree in public relations.

== Stand-up comedy career ==
Ryan started performing in Salt Lake City, Utah clubs. He also lived and performed in Seattle and performed often in Boston, all of which he considers his "comedy homes". He has appeared in several festivals and competitions including winning the Sierra Mist "America's Next Great Comic" search in 2005 and joining their national tour. In 2011 he won The Great American Comedy Festival. He has been a regular performer at the Just for Laughs Comedy festivals, including Montreal and Sydney, and was a two-time semi-finalist on Last Comic Standing. He has also performed stand-up on Conan, Comedy Central, and Showtime. Hamilton also opened for Jerry Seinfeld on his 2019 Live tour.

His one-hour special, Happy Face, became available on Netflix on August 29, 2017. On June 23, 2026, his stand-up special, This Just Hit Me, was released on Netflix.

== Filmography ==
Film and television appearances
| Year | Title | Role | Notes |
|---|---|---|---|
| 2026 | This Just Hit Me | Himself | Netflix stand up special |
| 2019-23 | The Tonight Show Starring Jimmy Fallon | Himself | 2 episodes |
| 2017 | Ryan Hamilton: Happy Face | Himself | Stand up special |
| 2016 | The Late Show with Stephen Colbert | Himself | 1 episode |
| 2015 | The Late Late Show | Himself | 1 episode |
| 2014 | Inside Amy Schumer | Himself | 1 episodes (2.08) |
| 2011-14 | Conan | Himself | 2 episodes |
| 2011 | Comedy.tv | Himself | 1 episode (1.21) |
| 2011 | The Ha!ifax Comedy Fest | Himself and writer | |
| 2011 | Caroline Rhea & Friends | Himself | TV movie |
| 2010 | Detroit International Comedy Festival | Himself | Documentary |
| 2010 | Last Comic Standing | Himself | Semi-finalist |
| 2007 | Live at Gotham | Himself | 1 episode (2.6) |
| 2007 | Last Comic Standing | Himself | Semi-finalist |

== Personal life ==
Hamilton resides in New York City.

In January 2022, he was hit by a shuttle bus as a pedestrian in Los Angeles at LAX airport, and suffered ten broken ribs, a compound fractured arm that required delayed emergency surgery, and a punctured collapsed lung. He recovered at his family home in Idaho.
