= Targhee Pass =

Mountain pass in Idaho and Montana

- Location within the United States Location within Idaho
- Elevation: 7,072 ft (2,156 m)
- Traversed by: US 20

Third Approach
- Location: Fremont County, Idaho / Gallatin County, Montana, U.S.
- Range: Rocky Mountains
- Coordinates: 44°40′29″N 111°16′33″W
- Topo map: USGS Targhee Pass

Targhee Pass is a mountain pass in the western United States on the Continental Divide. It is located along the border between southeastern Idaho and southwestern Montana, in the Henrys Lake Mountains at an elevation of 7,072 feet (2,156 m) above sea level. The pass is named for a Bannock chief.

U.S. Highway 20 (US 20) crosses the pass, approximately fifteen miles (24 km) west of West Yellowstone, on the western boundary of Yellowstone National Park. The pass provides the most direct access to the park from southern Idaho.

The pass is located in the Caribou–Targhee National Forest. Henrys Lake, the headwaters of the Henrys Fork, a tributary of the Snake River is located just west of the pass. Hebgen Lake, a reservoir on the Madison River, a tributary of the Missouri River, is located just north of the pass.

== Nez Perce War ==
During the Nez Perce War in 1877, Chief Joseph's band of Nez Perce traversed the pass on August 22 while evading U.S. Cavalry forces under the command of General Oliver O. Howard. The Nez Perce had just engaged the army in the Idaho Territory at the Battle of Camas Creek. After entering Montana Territory, the Indians moved east up the Madison River into Yellowstone National Park.

== See also ==
- Mountain passes in Montana
