= U.S. Route 20 in Montana =

Section of U.S. Highway in Montana

U.S. Highway 20
- US 20 highlighted in red

Route information
- Maintained by MDT
- Length: 9.680 mi (15.578 km)
- Existed: June 3, 1940–present

Major junctions
- West end: US 20 at the Idaho state line near West Yellowstone
- US 191 / US 287 in West Yellowstone
- East end: West Entrance of Yellowstone National Park

Location
- Country: United States
- State: Montana
- Counties: Gallatin

Highway system
- United States Numbered Highway System; List; Special; Divided; Montana Highway System; Interstate; US; State; Secondary
← MT 19	→ MT 21

U.S. Route 20 (US 20) is a transcontinental east–west U.S. Highway that travels between Newport, Oregon, and Boston, Massachusetts. It passes through southern Montana for approximately 10 miles (16 km), connecting Targhee Pass at the Idaho state line to the town of West Yellowstone and the West Entrance of Yellowstone National Park near the Wyoming border.

A series of early roads across Targhee Pass were constructed in the late 19th century and later incorporated into plans for a modern highway following the establishment of West Yellowstone. The new highway was completed by 1928 as part of US 191 and was incorporated into an extension of US 20 in 1940. US 191 was removed from the highway in 1978.

== Route description ==
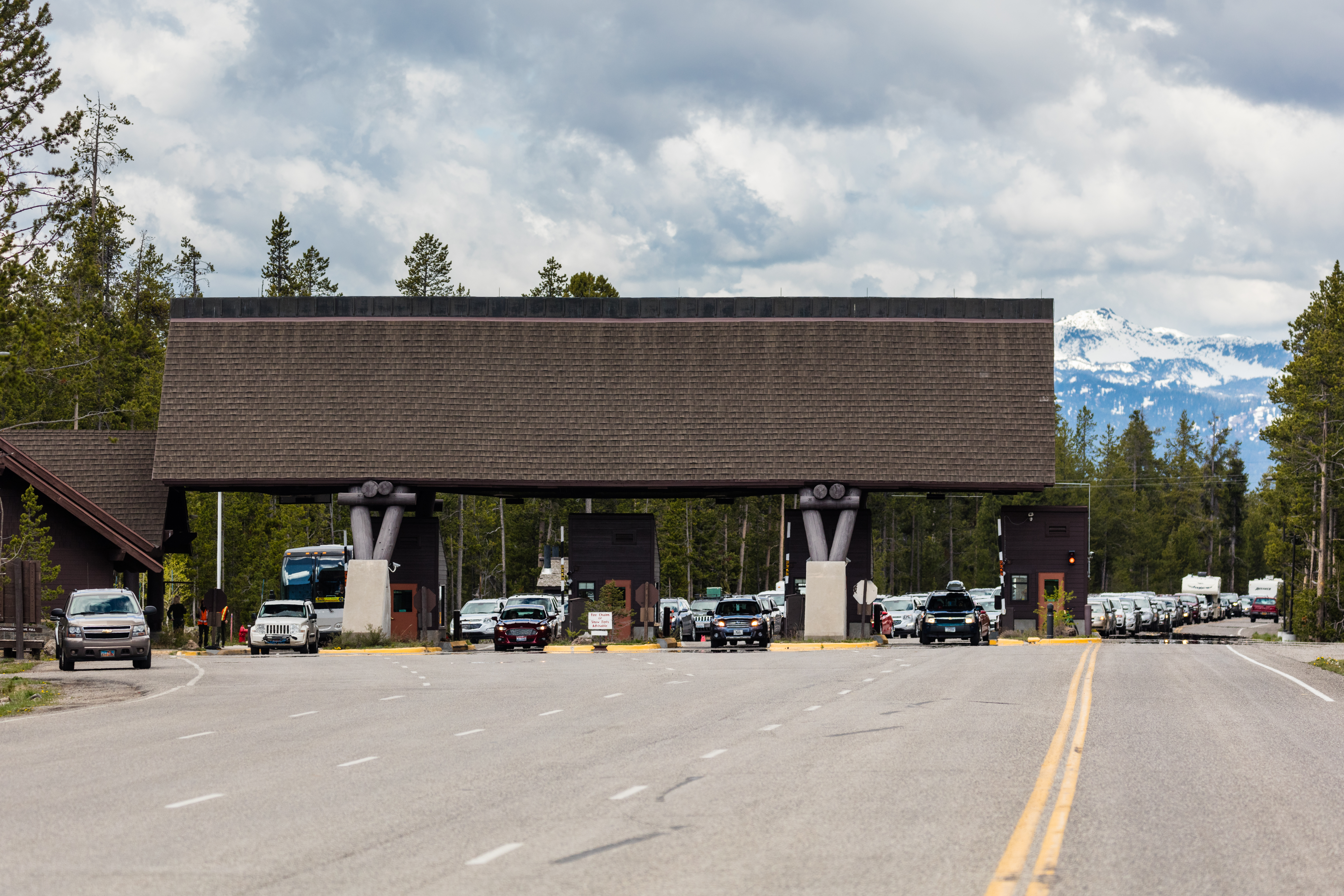
The West Entrance of Yellowstone National Park

US 20 enters Montana from Idaho at Targhee Pass at the Continental Divide near Howard Springs. The highway descends from the pass with a westbound truck lane to supplement its two lanes, traveling northeast through curves in a forest. US 20 then crosses a plain south of Hebgen Lake and turns southeast to approach the town of West Yellowstone. The highway passes Yellowstone Airport and enters the town on Firehole Avenue, which it follows until reaching a junction with North Canyon Street. US 20 turns south onto Canyon Street and joins a concurrency with US 191 and US 287, which then turn east onto Yellowstone Avenue near the Museum of the Yellowstone. The highways reach the western boundary of Yellowstone National Park, where they terminate but continue unofficially through the West Entrance and into Wyoming on unsigned park roads. Google Maps and other mapmakers may show US 20 going through Yellowstone National Park; however, it officially has a gap inside the park and resumes in Wyoming at the East Entrance.

The Montana section of US 20 is entirely within Gallatin County. It is designated as the Montana Medal of Honor Highway and is also part of the Nez Perce Trail, a National Historic Trail. US 20 is also part of the National Highway System, a network of highways identified as important to the national economy, defense, and other needs. The highway is maintained by the Montana Department of Transportation (MDT), which conducts an annual survey of traffic expressed in terms of annual average daily traffic. In 2021, daily traffic volumes on US 20 ranged from a minimum of 5,052 vehicles near Hebgen Lake to a maximum of 6,359 vehicles on North Canyon Street in West Yellowstone.

== History ==
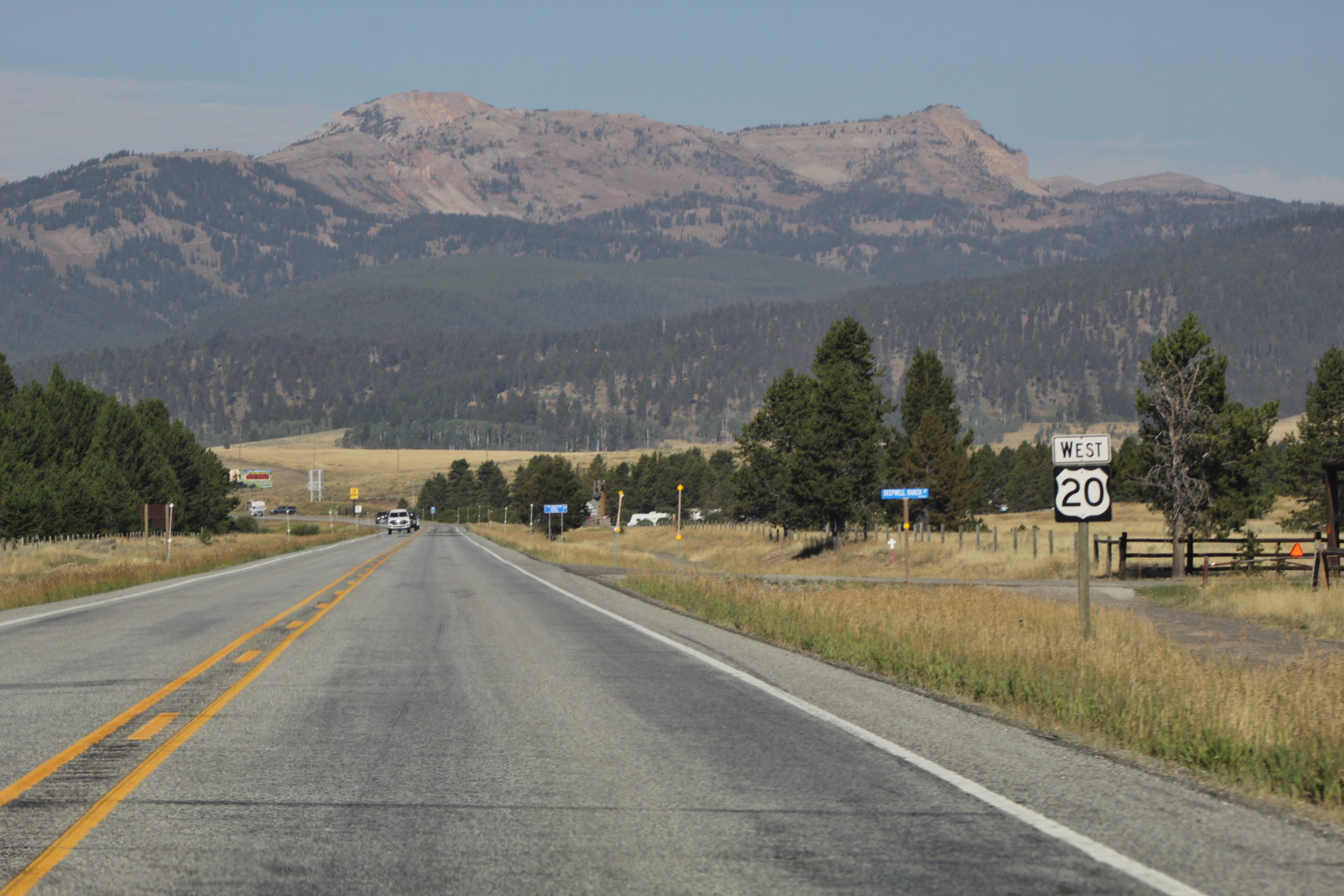
Looking westbound on US 20 near West Yellowstone.

Targhee Pass was historically used by local indigenous people who first occupied the areas of modern-day Targhee National Forest 11,000 years before present. Hunting trails and other paths crossing the pass were later used by white explorers and trappers in the 19th century. A year after the establishment of Yellowstone National Park in 1872, a rudimentary and unpaved road to the West Entrance was built by Gilman Sawtell from Virginia City to Madison Canyon. A new route for the West Entrance was opened in 1878 and replaced by 1896 with assistance from the U.S. Army Corps of Engineers.

Plans for a highway crossing Targhee Pass to serve the park and West Yellowstone—established in 1908 as a terminus by the Union Pacific Railroad—were conceived in the early 20th century. A survey crew was sent by the Bureau of Public Roads in June 1925 to plot the route of a nine-mile (14 km) highway connecting the pass to West Yellowstone as part of the Yellowstone Trail, an early auto trail route. The highway would be 16 feet (4.9 m) wide with shoulders and ditches as well as a six percent grade to afford smoother travel than the old, winding road. The Montana state government completed construction of the new highway by 1928 with federal aid funds.

The numbering plan for the United States Numbered Highway System was approved by the American Association of State Highway Officials (AASHO) on November 11, 1926, and included US 191 on the Targhee Pass–Yellowstone highway. Earlier proposals called for US 20 to extend to the Pacific Coast but were rejected by Oregon state highway officials due to the existing highways being found unsuitable for year-round travel. US 20 instead terminated at the East Entrance to Yellowstone National Park while a western extension was debated for several years. The extension, to be concurrent with US 191 to Blackfoot, Idaho, was approved by the AASHO on June 3, 1940. US 191 was truncated to the West Entrance on October 28, 1978, leaving US 20 as the sole highway crossing Targhee Pass.

== Major intersections ==
The entire route is in Gallatin County.

Location	mi	km	Destinations	Notes
Continental Divide	0.000	0.000	US 20 west – Idaho Falls	Continuation into Idaho
Continental Divide	0.000	0.000	Targhee Pass	
West Yellowstone	9.318	14.996	US 191 north / US 287 north (Canyon Street north) – Bozeman	Western end of US 191 / US 287 concurrency
Yellowstone National Park	9.680	15.578	US 191 ends / US 287 ends	US 20 eastern terminus; US 191 / US 287 southern terminus; eastern end of US 191 / US 287 concurrency
Yellowstone National Park	9.680	15.578	Yellowstone National Park boundary (West Entrance); fees required; closed winters	
Yellowstone National Park	9.680	15.578	West Entrance Road (to US 20 east / US 191 south / US 287 south)	Continuation into Yellowstone National Park; US 20 resumes in Wyoming at the park's east entrance; US 191 / US 287 resume in Wyoming at the park's south entrance
1.000 mi = 1.609 km; 1.000 km = 0.621 mi: Concurrency terminus; Tolled

U.S. Route 20
Previous state: Idaho	Montana	Next state: Wyoming
