= Henrys Lake Mountains =

Mountain range in Montana and Idaho, U.S.

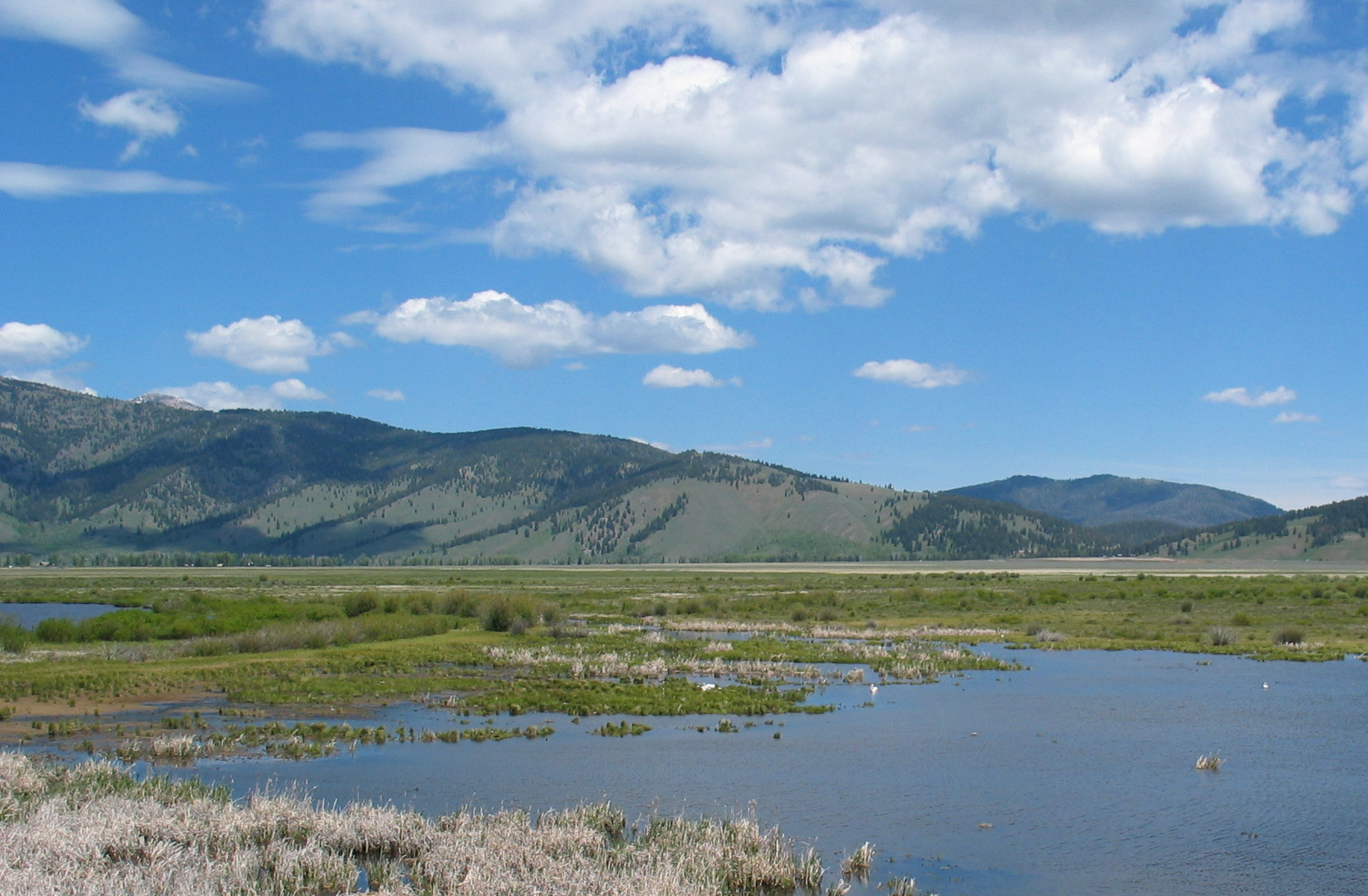
- Henrys Lake with Henrys Lake Mountains from Henrys Lake State Park, Idaho

Highest point
- Peak: Sheep Point
- Elevation: 10,609 ft (3,234 m)
- Coordinates: 44°46′52″N 111°24′00″W

Geography
- Location within Montana
- Country: United States
- State: Montana

The Henrys Lake Mountains, highest point Sheep Point, el. 10,609 feet (3,234 m), (See also) are a small mountain range northwest of West Yellowstone, Montana, in Madison County, Montana. These mountains are also referred to as the Lionhead Mountains, and straddle the Continental Divide along the Idaho-Montana border. On the northwest corner of these mountains is Quake Lake, created when the 1959 Hebgen Lake earthquake caused a massive landslide and dammed the Madison River. Nine subalpine lakes sit in high cirques in the higher reaches, with several peaks topping 10,000'. Coffin Lake is the largest and most popular, on the Montana side. About 32,000 acres are roadless in the Montana portion, with an unknown amount in Idaho. Dense forests, pristine streams, rolling tundra, and grassy parks provide year-round habitat for grizzly bears, elk, and bighorn sheep. Rocks and soils are inherently unstable, a factor in the landslide that caused much loss of life in 1959. The instability exists because the range is basically limestone blocks sitting on top of shale and Yellowstone volcanic rocks.

== See also ==
- List of mountain ranges in Montana
- List of mountain ranges in Idaho
