= Raynolds Pass =

Mountain pass in the Rocky Mountains of the United States

- Interactive map of Raynolds Pass
- Elevation: 6,844 ft (2,086 m)
- Traversed by: SH-87, MT 87

Third Approach
- Location: Fremont County, Idaho – Madison County, Montana, United States
- Range: Rocky Mountains
- Coordinates: 44°42.6′N 111°28.2′W

Raynolds Pass, elevation 6,844 feet (2,086 m), is a mountain pass on the Montana-Idaho border in the Rocky Mountains, United States. The pass is on the Continental Divide, and is traversed by a state highway (Idaho State Highway 87 and Montana Highway 87). The pass is named for Captain William F. Raynolds, an early explorer and officer-in-charge of the Raynolds Expedition of the Yellowstone region. The pass is very gentle, with only a slight grade and no major hairpin curves to the highways connections with U.S. Route 287 in Montana and U.S. Route 20 in Idaho.

== See also ==
- Mountain passes in Montana
