= Henrys Lake =

Lake in Idaho, United States

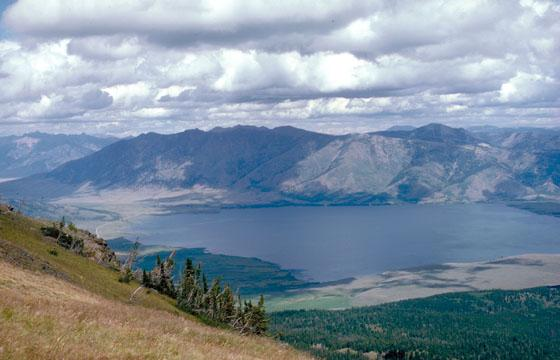
- Aerial view Courtesy of Idaho Tourism

- Location within Idaho Location within the United States
- Location: Fremont County, Idaho, U.S.
- Coordinates: 44.642°N 111.404°W
- Primary outflows: Henrys Fork
- Basin countries: United States
- Max. length: 4 mi (6.4 km)
- Max. width: 2 mi (3.2 km)
- Surface area: 6,078 acres (9.5 sq mi; 24.6 km^{2})
- Average depth: 2–9 ft (0.6–3 m)
- Surface elevation: 6,476 ft (1,974 m)

Henrys Lake is a small, shallow alpine lake in the western United States, in eastern Idaho. Approximately 8 square miles (21 km^{2}) in area, at 4 miles (6.4 km) in length and 2 miles (3.2 km) in width, its surface elevation is 6,472 ft (1,973 m) above sea level.

It is on the southwest side of the Henrys Lake Mountains of northern Fremont County, approximately two miles south of the continental divide along the Montana state line, just west of Targhee Pass and north of Sawtell Peak. The lake provides the headwaters of the Henrys Fork, a tributary of the Snake River. The lake lies less than ten miles (16 km) across the continental divide from the headwaters of the Missouri River in southwestern Montana. It is 16 miles (26 km) due west of the western boundary of Yellowstone National Park, located in an enclave of Caribou-Targhee National Forest.

A dam built at the outlet of Henrys Lake in 1923 dramatically increased the surface area of the lake.

Springs are found around the shoreline at Staley Springs, Pintail Point, Kelly Springs, the Cliffs, and along the northshore of the lake. Inlets are found at Timber Creek, Targhee Creek, Howard Creek, Duck Creek, Hope Creek, and Kenny Creek.

== History ==
The area surrounding Henrys Lake has been inhabited by Native Americans for centuries. It was later seen by and named after Andrew Henry. During the Nez Perce War and following the Battle of Camas Creek near what is now Kilgore, the Nez Perce tribe proceeded eastward toward Yellowstone. After receiving word that the Nez Perce had entered the wilderness area, General Oliver O. Howard rested for several days on the side of the lake. To this point, Howards troops had marched every day for 26 days at an unusually quick pace.

Following the Russian invasion of Finland in 1939, the U.S. Army began construction of a training outpost to be called the West Yellowstone Winter Training Camp near Henrys Lake Station. Plans were created that included a 100,000 acre training area that could hold 30,000 personnel. Some buildings were constructed in 1941, but were ordered destroyed in 1942. At the time, the military offered no reasoning for the reversal of the plan. It was later discovered by an Ashton resident that the military did not want to interfere with trumpeter swans which used the lake as a breeding ground. The winter training program was relocated to Fort Drum in New York.

== Wildlife ==
Henrys Lake is home to a variety of migrating birds. The western and eastern edges of the lake provide wetland/marsh habitats that serve as breeding areas for many birds in spring. Notable at Henrys Lake are white pelicans, widgeon, lesser scaup, cormorants, red-necked and western grebes, coots, mallards, bufflehead, ring-necked ducks, Canada geese, blue-winged teal, eared grebe, killdeer, common merganser, common tern, cinnamon teal, trumpeter swans, great blue heron, California seagulls, bald eagles, Swainson's hawks, red-tailed hawks, red-winged blackbirds, cowbirds and more. The lake and the surrounding area is also home to a variety of mammals including moose, deer, black bear, grizzly bear, fox, and many others.

== Recreation ==
Henrys Lake is a popular destination for sport fishing. The most common species in the lake is Yellowstone cutthroat. They make up 55 percent of the trout population. The average size in 2015 was 15 inches, with biologists finding some fish over 20 inches. The second most prevalent species is rainbow-cutthroat hybrids, which make up 24 percent of the population. The average size is 19 inches, although Idaho Fish and Game found hybrids longer than 25 inches. Brook trout make up 21 percent of the population. The average length is 16 inches, with biologists finding several brook trout that exceeded 20 inches in length. There is a fish hatchery on the north side of the lake that helps to replenish the lake.

Recreational access

On the south shore on the lake, Henrys Lake State Park is a 585-acre state park off of U.S. 20 near Goose Bay and the Henrys Lake Outlet with hiking trails, camping facilities and boat ramp. Frome Park on the west shore of Henrys Lake is owned and operated by Fremont County. The park's limited facilities include a boat ramp and campsites, both of which are free. The South Shore Boat Access offers a boat ramp, primitive camping, fishing, and platform for wildlife viewing.

The Continental Divide Trail skirts around Henry's Lake. Many northbound through hikers opt out of this section when leaving Yellowstone National Park and entering the Centennial Mountain Range in Idaho.

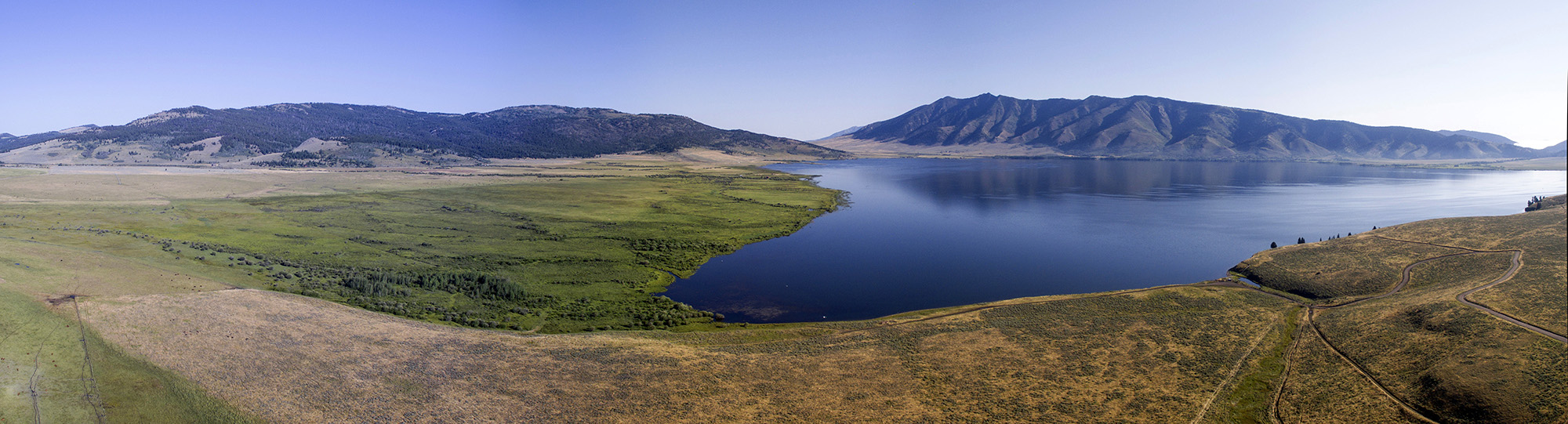
Wetlands at the west end of Henrys Lake, a breeding area for birds.
