= Ashton, Idaho =

- City
- Location of Ashton in Fremont County, Idaho.
- Coordinates: 44°04′24″N 111°26′54″W
- Country: United States
- State: Idaho
- County: Fremont

Area
  - Total: 0.64 sq mi (1.65 km^{2})
  - Land: 0.64 sq mi (1.65 km^{2})
  - Water: 0 sq mi (0.00 km^{2})
- Elevation: 5,259 ft (1,603 m)

Population (2020)
  - Total: 949
  - Density: 1,490/sq mi (575/km^{2})
- Time zone: UTC-7 (Mountain (MST))
  - Summer (DST): UTC-6 (MDT)
- ZIP codes: 83420, 83447
- Area code: 208
- FIPS code: 16-03610
- GNIS feature ID: 2409741
- Website: www.cityofashton.com

Ashton is a city in Fremont County, Idaho, United States. The population was 949 at the 2020 census, and it is part of the Rexburg Micropolitan Statistical Area. The district is noted for seed potato production and bills itself as the world's largest seed potato growing area.

== History ==
=== Railroad ===
In 1900, the Union Pacific Railroad, under the careful watch of the Oregon Short Line (OSL) and St. Anthony Railroad Company, brought the railroad into the Upper Snake River Valley from Idaho Falls to St. Anthony, Idaho, 14 miles (23 km) southwest of what became Ashton. The venture had considerable local support and official support from the LDS Church. Following successful construction and operation of the St. Anthony Railroad, Union Pacific, under the careful watch of the OSL and the Yellowstone Park Railroad Company, began plans for another railroad from St. Anthony to the Madison River entrance of Yellowstone National Park or to what is now known as West Yellowstone. For years, Union Pacific wanted improved rail access to Yellowstone's geyser basins and to Old Faithful Inn, that opened in 1904. Old Faithful Inn was only 30 miles (48 km) from the Madison River entrance, nearly half the distance from the Northern Entrance at Gardiner, Montana that was served by the Northern Pacific Railroad. The planned route for the new railroad was through Marysville, up Warm River Canyon into the forested Island Park country, and on over the Continental Divide at Rea's Pass into what became West Yellowstone. Despite the obvious economic advantages and support, the residents of Marysville, perfectly happy without a railroad, resisted the new railroad intruding upon their land and into their lives. The matter was expeditiously resolved when Union Pacific decided to build the railroad through a new town one mile (1.6 km) west of Marysville named after the OSL Chief Engineer, William Ashton. The founding of Ashton and the first scheduled train service to Ashton both occurred in 1906 with predictable results. Ashton quickly sprang to life while Marysville slowly declined into near oblivion. One of the two founding fathers, H. G. "Fess" Fuller, became the long-time Mayor of Ashton and the other, Charles C. Moore, went on to become Governor of Idaho.

The Yellowstone Branch, as the new railroad was known, was very unusual in that it was built primarily for passenger service and secondarily for freight. Aesthetic stone depots, rather than standard wooden ones, were built at Rexburg, Idaho, and at West Yellowstone to lure and impress tourists traveling to Yellowstone National Park and Old Faithful Inn. In addition to regular freight and passenger service, there were two special named trains, the Yellowstone Special and the Yellowstone Express, that ran to West Yellowstone in the summer tourist season. From Ashton north, the railroad was never plowed of snow, except in spring, so that Ashton became the wintertime rail terminus for the entire region.

=== Development ===
Beginning in 1910, Ashton was the railhead used for the construction of Jackson Lake Dam in Grand Teton National Park by the Bureau of Reclamation. For several years, materials and equipment were freighted by wagon from the Reclamation Building in Ashton to the dam site at Moran, Wyoming on what was known as the Ashton-Moran Road or Reclamation Road, as the locals called it, that ran 56 miles (90 km) over the north end of the Teton Range. Union Pacific then built the Teton Valley Branch railroad to Driggs and Victor from Ashton and completed in 1912. They built an engine house and other railroad facilities in Ashton to service the Teton Valley Branch and the Yellowstone Branch. These and further developments in the area soon made Ashton prosper and become one of the more important towns in Eastern Idaho.

American Dog Derby

Ashton, being at the head of the Snake River Plain and at the end of the Yellowstone moisture channel, has 20 inches of precipitation annually (according to usclimatedata.com). Not as much snow as the typical ski town in Colorado as Crested Butte gets over 40 inches in January alone (according to usclimatedata.com). See "Effects on Climate" in article "Snake River Plain"). Ashton was also the wintertime rail terminus for the region and where there was considerable development in the higher country north and east of Ashton, there arose a need for wintertime travel to the snowbound areas around Ashton. People began using the only wintertime transportation available at the time...dogsled. There became several accomplished mushers in the area whose livelihood became their dog teams. The many mushers, dog teams and their abilities were fun topics of conversation and it was not long before a race was organized that, by fate, would become the world-famous American Dog Derby.

The legend goes that a few of the boys were socializing in the barbershop one quiet winter day when Jay Ball, a beloved Ashton businessman, hatched his idea of a dog race after reading about dog races held in Alaska and Canada. The idea resonated with local mushers and businessmen alike and the first race, a simple 55-mile (89 km) run down the unplowed Yellowstone Branch from West Yellowstone to Ashton, was held on March 4, 1917. A blizzard held up the finish making spectators wait two days to see what was supposed to be a one-day race, but it was enough of a success that it was promoted and held again the following year. Union Pacific Railroad, always advancing their interests, helped to promote the races. The second race, designed to be more spectator friendly, was held in the open fields around Ashton on a figure-eight course with Ashton at the intersection so that teams would come running through town twice each lap. Interest in the American Dog Derby grew. Union Pacific brought spectators in special trains and by the early twenties, thousands of people thronged the streets of Ashton each February to see mushers and dogs come charging down Main Street on one of their laps. It may have been Ashton's beautiful view of the Tetons, it may have been the happy cast of characters involved, but for whatever reason, by 1923, the American Dog Derby had captured the imagination of the western world. Newspaper correspondents and newsreel cameramen came from distant cities seeking the inside story of the American Dog Derby while crowds grew to 10,000 or more people in this town of less than two thousand. Winning mushers became celebrities and some became wealthy. A female musher nicknamed Whistling Lyd toured the United States and Canada, appeared in a movie, and may have been on her way to being a movie star when she died of pneumonia in 1930. The buildup to and the results of the American Dog Derby were reported by newspapers and by newsreels in the Americas, in Europe, and elsewhere. Ashton was dubbed, “the best known American town in the world.”

Seed potatoes Ashton was first and foremost a farming community, as the soil of the area is rich and the water is plentiful. Shortly after the first settlers arrived in the 1890s, several canals were developed to divert water from streams running off the Yellowstone Plateau and Teton Range. Some farmland, mostly to the east, is high enough and close enough to the Teton Range that crops can grow without irrigation due to increased rainfall. The relatively high altitude limited crops to those requiring a short growing season such as grain and alfalfa. Seed potatoes were not tried as a crop until 1920 but as it turns out, the area is perfect for seed potatoes. The short growing season keeps the potatoes desirably small, and the long, cold winters create the ideal conditions for seed. The longtime enemy to potato farming is potato blight, a form of mold that reproduces from spores in the soil and sickens the potato plant. Ashton's winters clean the soil of these mold spores with a long, deep and killing freeze. Potato blight never spreads because the soil is clean and free of spores each spring. After realizing this, farmers organized, hired inspectors, and began selling certified seed potatoes giving buyers comfort that Ashton seed was free of molds and disease. This enabled them to demand a premium price for these potatoes grown in the clean soils around Ashton and the area quickly became the largest seed potato producing area in the world as it is still known today.

== Geography and climate ==
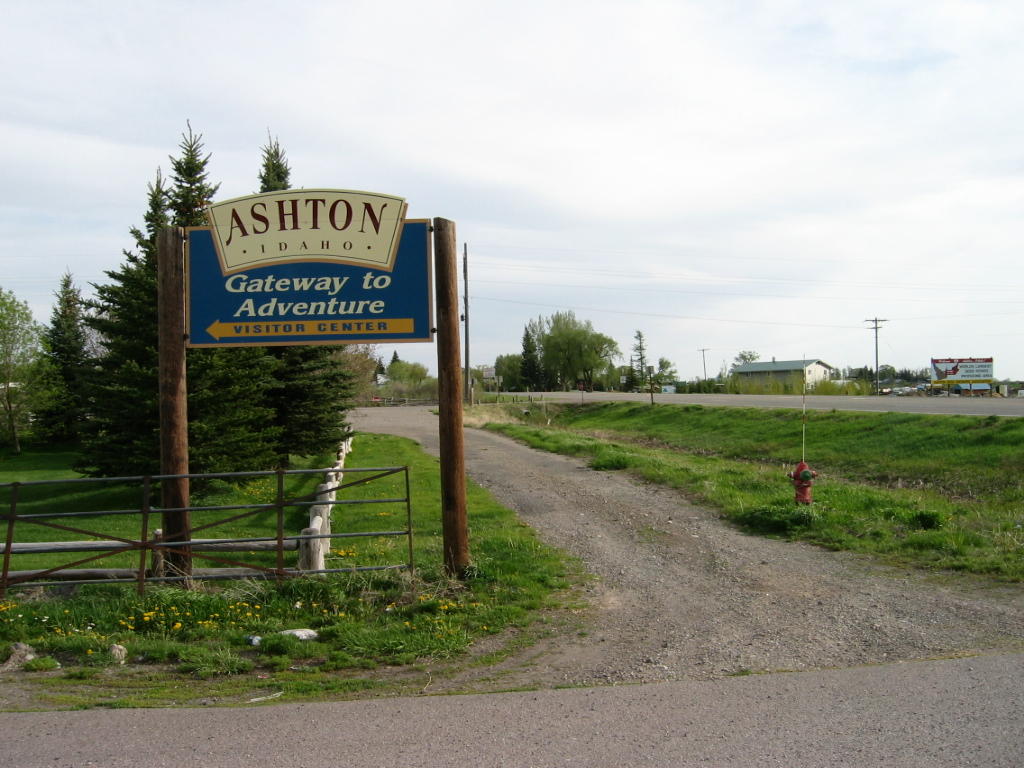
Ashton is the access point towards 20 feet tall and 200 feet wide Cave Falls, the starting point of hikers in the Bechler region.

Ashton is located at an elevation of 5,259 feet (1,603 m) above mean sea level.

According to the United States Census Bureau, the city has a total area of 0.66 square miles (1.71 km^{2}), all of it land.

Ashton is 18 miles (29 km) from the southwest corner of Yellowstone National Park, 24 miles (39 km) from Grand Teton National Park and 39 miles (63 km) from the Grand Teton with a clear view. Ashton is surrounded by farmland but is less than five miles (8 km) from the Targhee National Forest. There are four rivers within 10 miles (16 km) of Ashton, and all are outstanding trout streams: the Henrys Fork of the Snake River, Fall River, the Teton River and Warm River. Also nearby are three notable waterfalls: Upper Mesa Falls and Lower Mesa Falls, both on the Henrys Fork, and Cave Falls on Fall River.

=== Moisture channel ===
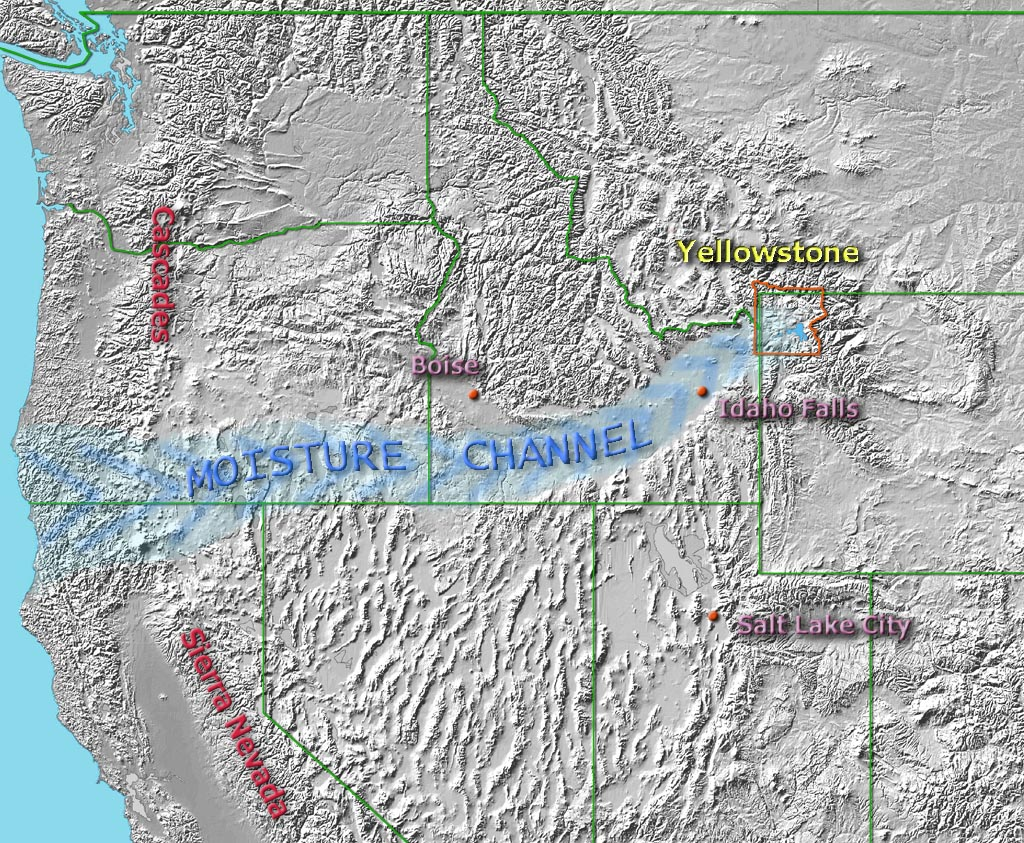
Moisture Channel

Precipitation map

Ashton's climate is unique and distinct relative to most of the U.S. northern Intermountain West. Ashton's annual precipitation, at 20 inches (51 cm), is among the highest in southern Idaho and yet Ashton is not in the mountains. Further, the areas five miles (8 km) north or five miles (8 km) east of Ashton receive over 30 inches (76 cm) of precipitation while St. Anthony, only 13 miles (21 km) to the southwest, receives only 14 inches (36 cm). This unusually high precipitation in the Ashton area is due to the geography of southern Idaho and Yellowstone. The Snake River Plain, formed by the Yellowstone hotspot across southern Idaho, creates a moisture channel that extends from the Pacific Ocean to the Ashton and Yellowstone area. Average monthly precipitation in Ashton shows a transitional regime. Precipitation peaks first in December–January, reflecting influence from Pacific Ocean-originating storms during the winter season, and second in May and June, reflecting showers and thunderstorms that create a May/June rainfall peak that prevails in nearby Montana and Wyoming. Ashton has relatively drier summers (July/August). This area marks the virtually easternmost extremity of the typical Pacific Northwest annual precipitation pattern, with its dry summers. According to the Köppen climate classification, Ashton has a dry-summer humid continental climate (Köppen climate classification: Dsb).

=== Temperature and precipitation ===
Climate data for Ashton, Idaho, 1991–2020 normals, extremes 1897–2023
Month	Jan	Feb	Mar	Apr	May	Jun	Jul	Aug	Sep	Oct	Nov	Dec	Year
Record high °F (°C)	54 (12)	61 (16)	70 (21)	88 (31)	90 (32)	98 (37)	101 (38)	99 (37)	95 (35)	85 (29)	74 (23)	60 (16)	101 (38)
Mean maximum °F (°C)	40.0 (4.4)	44.2 (6.8)	55.7 (13.2)	71.6 (22.0)	81.1 (27.3)	86.0 (30.0)	92.0 (33.3)	91.7 (33.2)	86.0 (30.0)	74.7 (23.7)	57.5 (14.2)	42.5 (5.8)	93.3 (34.1)
Mean daily maximum °F (°C)	28.9 (−1.7)	32.6 (0.3)	42.3 (5.7)	53.8 (12.1)	65.3 (18.5)	73.1 (22.8)	82.6 (28.1)	82.7 (28.2)	72.5 (22.5)	57.1 (13.9)	40.1 (4.5)	29.2 (−1.6)	55.0 (12.8)
Daily mean °F (°C)	21.1 (−6.1)	24.7 (−4.1)	33.4 (0.8)	42.6 (5.9)	52.5 (11.4)	59.4 (15.2)	66.7 (19.3)	65.6 (18.7)	57.1 (13.9)	44.6 (7.0)	31.4 (−0.3)	21.9 (−5.6)	43.4 (6.3)
Mean daily minimum °F (°C)	13.4 (−10.3)	16.8 (−8.4)	24.5 (−4.2)	31.4 (−0.3)	39.7 (4.3)	45.7 (7.6)	50.9 (10.5)	48.5 (9.2)	41.8 (5.4)	32.2 (0.1)	22.7 (−5.2)	14.6 (−9.7)	31.9 (−0.1)
Mean minimum °F (°C)	−9.2 (−22.9)	−4.0 (−20.0)	4.6 (−15.2)	16.1 (−8.8)	25.8 (−3.4)	32.8 (0.4)	39.6 (4.2)	36.8 (2.7)	28.3 (−2.1)	16.2 (−8.8)	1.8 (−16.8)	−8.8 (−22.7)	−14.1 (−25.6)
Record low °F (°C)	−35 (−37)	−37 (−38)	−30 (−34)	−3 (−19)	6 (−14)	18 (−8)	24 (−4)	20 (−7)	10 (−12)	−7 (−22)	−18 (−28)	−36 (−38)	−37 (−38)
Average precipitation inches (mm)	2.31 (59)	1.53 (39)	1.29 (33)	1.70 (43)	2.24 (57)	2.15 (55)	0.64 (16)	0.85 (22)	1.17 (30)	1.63 (41)	1.90 (48)	2.26 (57)	19.67 (500)
Average snowfall inches (cm)	19.8 (50)	10.7 (27)	5.3 (13)	2.0 (5.1)	0.0 (0.0)	0.0 (0.0)	0.0 (0.0)	0.0 (0.0)	0.0 (0.0)	1.6 (4.1)	10.5 (27)	20.2 (51)	70.1 (177.2)
Average precipitation days (≥ 0.01 in)	9.3	7.0	6.6	7.3	8.0	6.4	3.4	3.7	4.6	5.2	7.0	9.7	78.2
Average snowy days (≥ 0.1 in)	7.8	5.3	3.3	1.0	0.0	0.0	0.0	0.0	0.0	0.8	4.4	8.7	31.3
Source 1: NOAA
Source 2: National Weather Service

== Demographics ==
=== 2010 census ===
Historical population
Census	Pop.	Note	%±
1910	502		—
1920	1,022		103.6%
1930	1,003		−1.9%
1940	1,203		19.9%
1950	1,256		4.4%
1960	1,242		−1.1%
1970	1,187		−4.4%
1980	1,219		2.7%
1990	1,114		−8.6%
2000	1,129		1.3%
2010	1,127		−0.2%
2020	949		−15.8%
U.S. Decennial Census

At the 2010 census, there were 1,127 people, 397 households and 286 families residing in the city. The population density was 1,707.6 per square mile (659.3/km^{2}). There were 451 housing units at an average density of 683.3 per square mile (263.8/km^{2}). The racial make-up was 85.0% White, 0.1% African American, 0.4% Native American, 0.3% Pacific Islander, 12.2% from other races and 2.1% from two or more races. Hispanic or Latino of any race were 17.6% of the population.

There were 397 households, of which 39.3% had children under the age of 18 living with them, 57.9% were married couples living together, 8.6% had a female householder with no husband present, 5.5% had a male householder with no wife present, and 28.0% were non-families. 24.9% of all households were made up of individuals, and 12.8% had someone living alone who was 65 years of age or older. The average household size was 2.77 and the average family size was 3.34.

The median age was 33.4 years. 32.4% of residents were under the age of 18; 7% were between the ages of 18 and 24; 23.5% were from 25 to 44; 21.1% were from 45 to 64; and 16% were 65 years of age or older. The gender make-up was 49.1% male and 50.9% female.

=== 2000 census ===
As of the 2000 census, there were 1,129 people, 395 households and 285 families residing in the city. The population density was 2,065.0 per square mile (797.3/km^{2}). There were 466 housing units at an average density of 852.4 per square mile (329.1/km^{2}). The racial make-up was 86.71% White, 0.44% African American, 0.53% Native American, 0.09% Asian, 11.43% from other races and 0.80% from two or more races. Hispanic or Latino of any race were 13.91% of the population.

There were 395 households, of which 38.0% had children under the age of 18 living with them, 60.3% were married couples living together, 7.8% had a female householder with no husband present, and 27.6% were non-families. 26.3% of all households were made up of individuals, and 15.9% had someone living alone who was 65 years of age or older. The average household size was 2.79 and the average family size was 3.43.

33.0% of the population were under the age of 18, 7.5% from 18 to 24, 24.5% from 25 to 44, 17.4% from 45 to 64 and 17.4% were 65 years of age or older. The median age was 33 years. For every 100 females, there were 92.3 males. For every 100 females age 18 and over, there were 92.9 males.

The median household income was $30,282 and the median family income was $35,515. Males had a median income of $27,273 and females $22,000. The per capita income was $13,731. About 13.7% of families and 19.7% of the population were below the poverty line, including 28.2% of those under age 18 and 12.8% of those age 65 or over.

== Education ==
It is located in the Fremont County Joint School District #215, headquartered in St. Anthony.

The public schools in Ashton are Ashton Elementary School and North Fremont Junior High/High School, operated by the district.

College of Eastern Idaho includes this county in its catchment zone; however this county is not in its taxation zone.

== Notable residents ==
- Ryan Hamilton, stand-up comic, born in Ashton. He frequently refers to Ashton in his act.
