= Baldy Mountain (Idaho/Montana) =

Mountain on the border of the states of Idaho and Montana

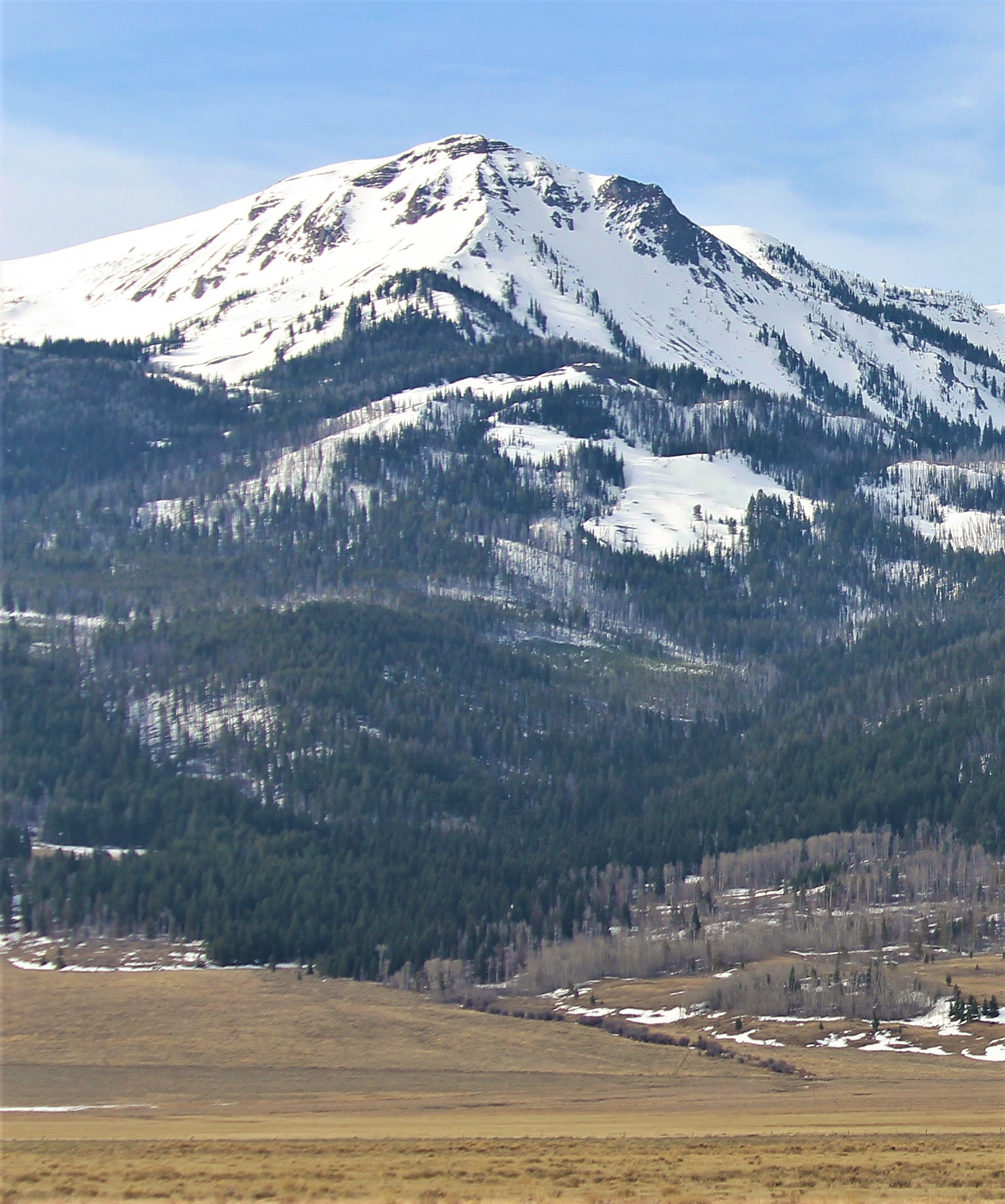
- North aspect

Highest point
- Elevation: 9,892 ft (3,015 m)
- Prominence: 2,360 ft (720 m)
- Parent peak: Mount Jefferson (10,216 ft)
- Isolation: 18.04 mi (29.03 km)
- Coordinates: 44°34′00″N 111°52′10″W

Geography
- Location within Montana Location within the United States
- Country: United States
- State: Idaho / Montana
- County: Clark / Beaverhead
- Protected area: Centennial Mountains Wilderness Study Area
- Parent range: Rocky Mountains; Bitterroot Range; Centennial Mountains
- Topo map: USGS Slide Mountain

Climbing
- Easiest route: class 2

Baldy Mountain is a 9,892-foot elevation (3,015 m) mountain summit on the common border shared by Beaverhead County, Montana, and Clark County, Idaho.

== Description ==
Baldy Mountain is the third-highest peak in the Centennial Mountains which are a subrange of the Bitterroot Range. The mountain lies on the Continental Divide and the Idaho–Montana border. It is located south of Red Rock Lakes National Wildlife Refuge on land managed by Centennial Mountains Wilderness Study Area, of which it is the highest point. Precipitation runoff from the mountain's north slope drains to Lower Red Rock Lake and Red Rock River, whereas the south slope drains to Ching Creek in Idaho. Topographic relief is modest as the summit rises approximately 3,300 feet (1,000 meters) above Lower Red Rock Lake in 3.8 miles (6.1 km). This landform's toponym has been officially adopted by the United States Board on Geographic Names.

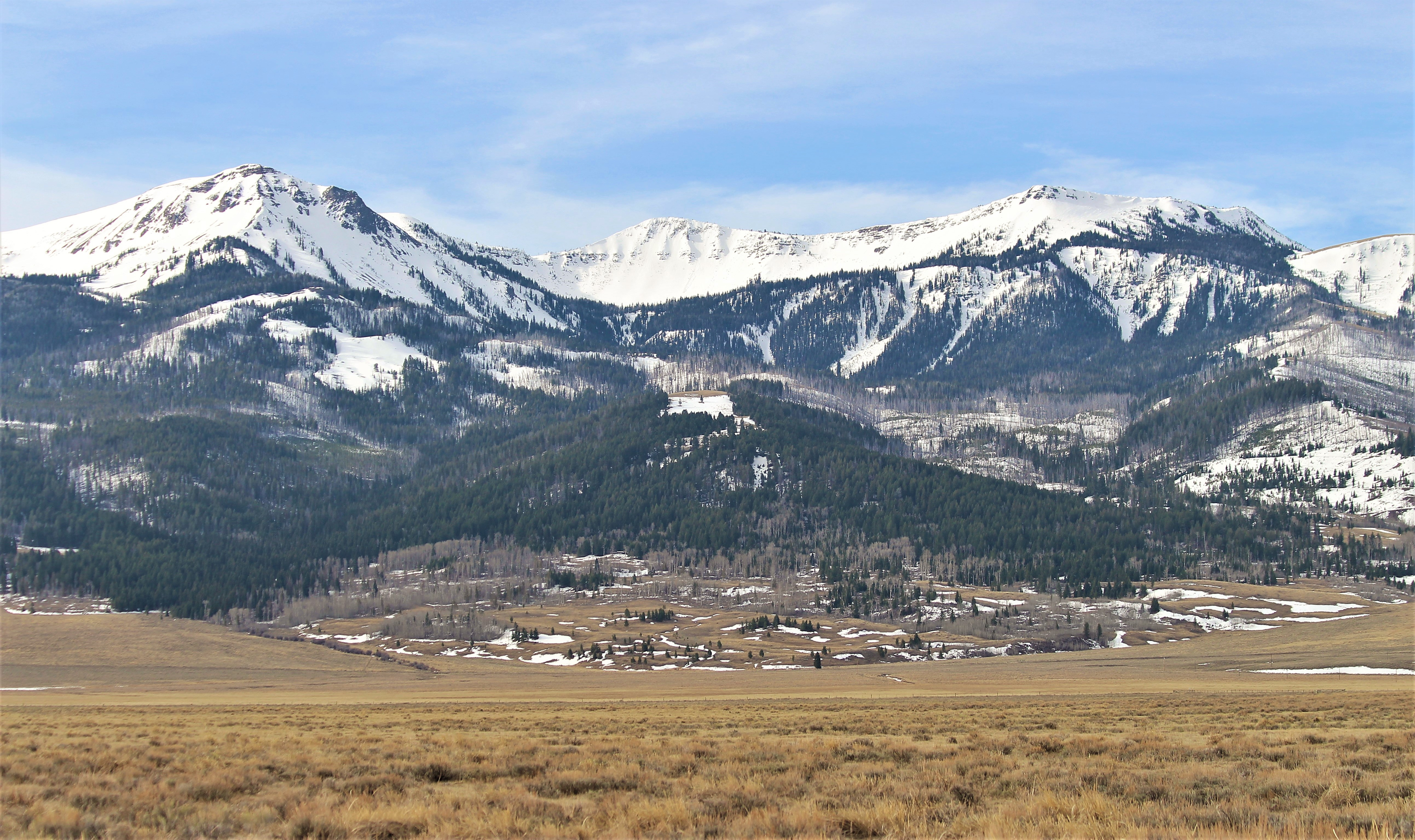
Baldy Mountain from the north

== Climate ==
Based on the Köppen climate classification, Baldy Mountain is located in a subarctic climate zone characterized by long, usually very cold winters, and mild summers. Winter temperatures can drop below −10 °F with wind chill factors below −30 °F.

== See also ==
- Geology of the Rocky Mountains
