= Mississippi River System =

Major river system in the United States

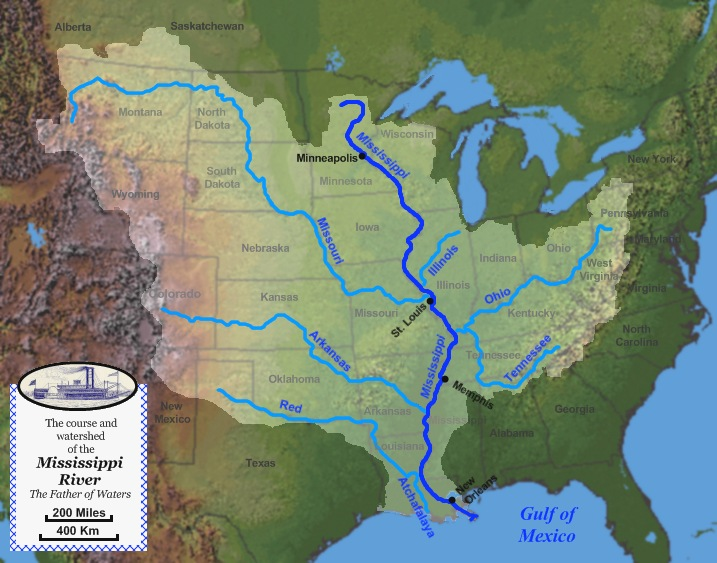
- Mississippi River course, watershed, and major tributaries

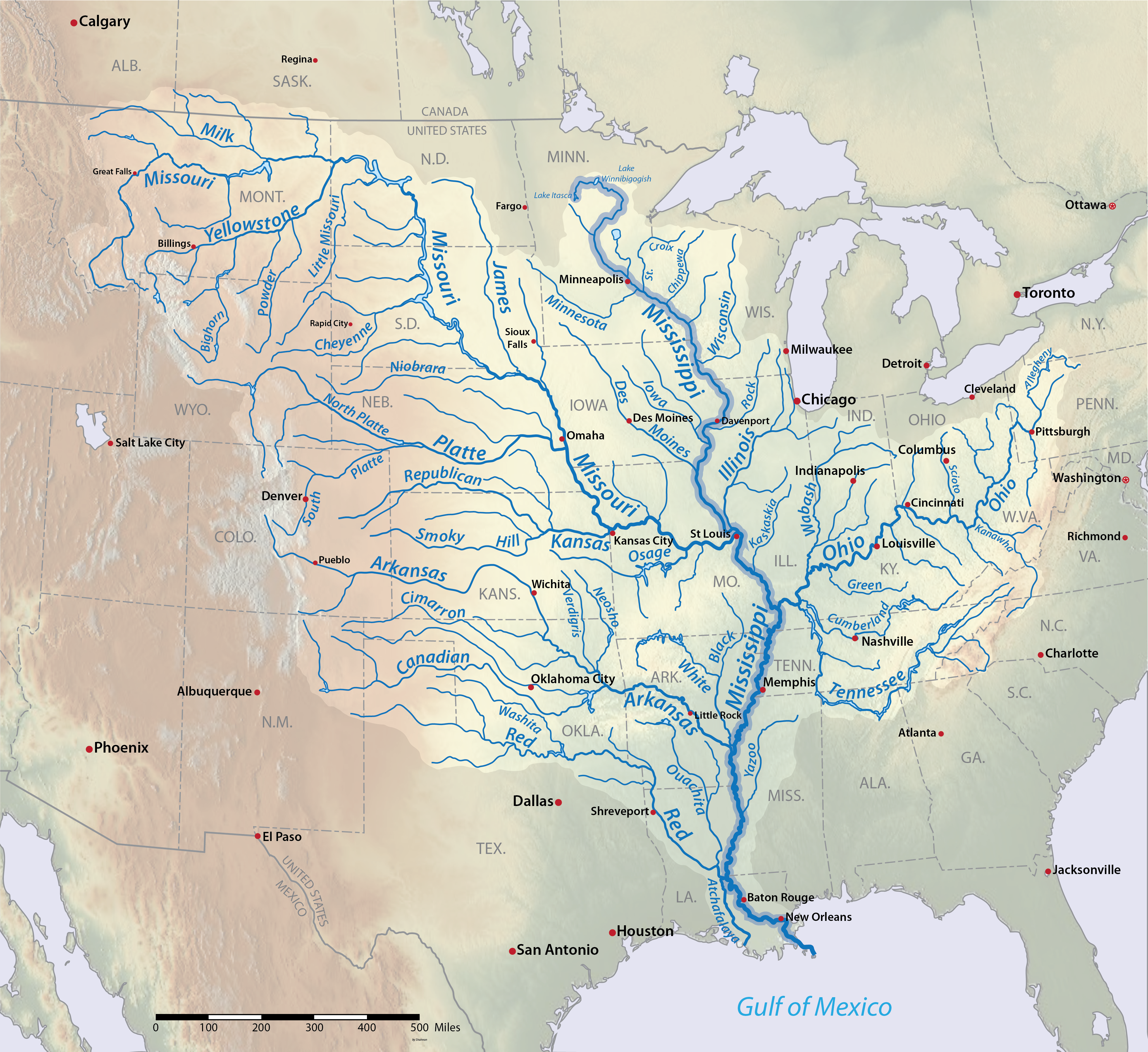
- Details of the Mississippi River tributaries

Location
- Country: United States and Canada

Physical characteristics
- Mouth
  - location: Gulf of Mexico
  - coordinates: 29°09′04″N 89°15′12″W
  - elevation: 0 ft (0 m)
- Basin size: 1,151,000 km^{2} (444,000 sq mi)
- Discharge
  - location: mouth; max and min at Baton Rouge, LA
  - average: 593,000 cu ft/s (16,800 m^{3}/s)
  - minimum: 159,000 cu ft/s (4,500 m^{3}/s)
  - maximum: 3,065,000 cu ft/s (86,800 m^{3}/s)
- Discharge
  - location: St. Louis
  - average: 168,000 cu ft/s (4,800 m^{3}/s)

The Mississippi River System, also referred to as the Western Rivers and Mississippi-Missouri Basin, is a mostly riverine network of the United States which includes the Mississippi River and connecting waterways. The Mississippi River is the largest drainage basin in the United States. In the United States, the Mississippi drains about 41% of the country's land area.

From the perspective of natural geography and hydrology, the system consists of the Mississippi River itself and its numerous natural tributaries and distributaries. The major tributaries are the Arkansas, Illinois, Missouri, Ohio and Red rivers. Given their flow volumes, major Ohio River tributaries like the Allegheny, Tennessee, and Wabash rivers are considered important tributaries to the Mississippi system. Before the Mississippi River reaches the Gulf of Mexico, it runs into its distributary, the Atchafalaya River.

From the perspective of modern commercial navigation, the system includes the above as well as navigable inland waterways which are connected by artificial means. Important connecting waterways include the Illinois Waterway, the Tennessee-Tombigbee Waterway, and the Gulf Intracoastal Waterway. This system of waterways is maintained by the U.S. Army Corps of Engineers with a project depth of between 9–12 ft (2.7–3.7 m) to accommodate barge transportation, primarily of bulk commodities.

The Mississippi River carries 60% of U.S. grain shipments, 22% of oil and gas shipments, and 20% of coal.

== Major tributaries ==
Major Tributaries of the Mississippi River System
River	Length	Source	Mouth	States
1. Upper Mississippi River	1,250 mi (2,010 km)	Lake Itasca, Minnesota	St. Louis, Missouri	Minnesota, Wisconsin, Iowa, Illinois, Missouri
2. Arkansas River	1,469 mi (2,364 km)	Leadville, Colorado	Franklin Township, Arkansas	Colorado, Kansas, Oklahoma, Arkansas
3. Illinois River	273 mi (439 km)	Grundy County, Illinois	Grafton, Illinois	Illinois
4. Missouri River	2,522 mi (4,059 km)	Brower's Spring, Montana	Spanish Lake, near St. Louis, Missouri	Montana, North Dakota, South Dakota, Nebraska, Iowa, Kansas, Missouri
5. Ohio River	981 mi (1,579 km)	Pittsburgh, Pennsylvania	Cairo, Illinois	Pennsylvania, Ohio, West Virginia, Kentucky, Indiana, Illinois
6. Red River of the South	1,290 mi (2,080 km)	Harmon County, Oklahoma	Morgan City, Louisiana	Texas, Oklahoma, Arkansas and Louisiana

=== Upper Mississippi River ===
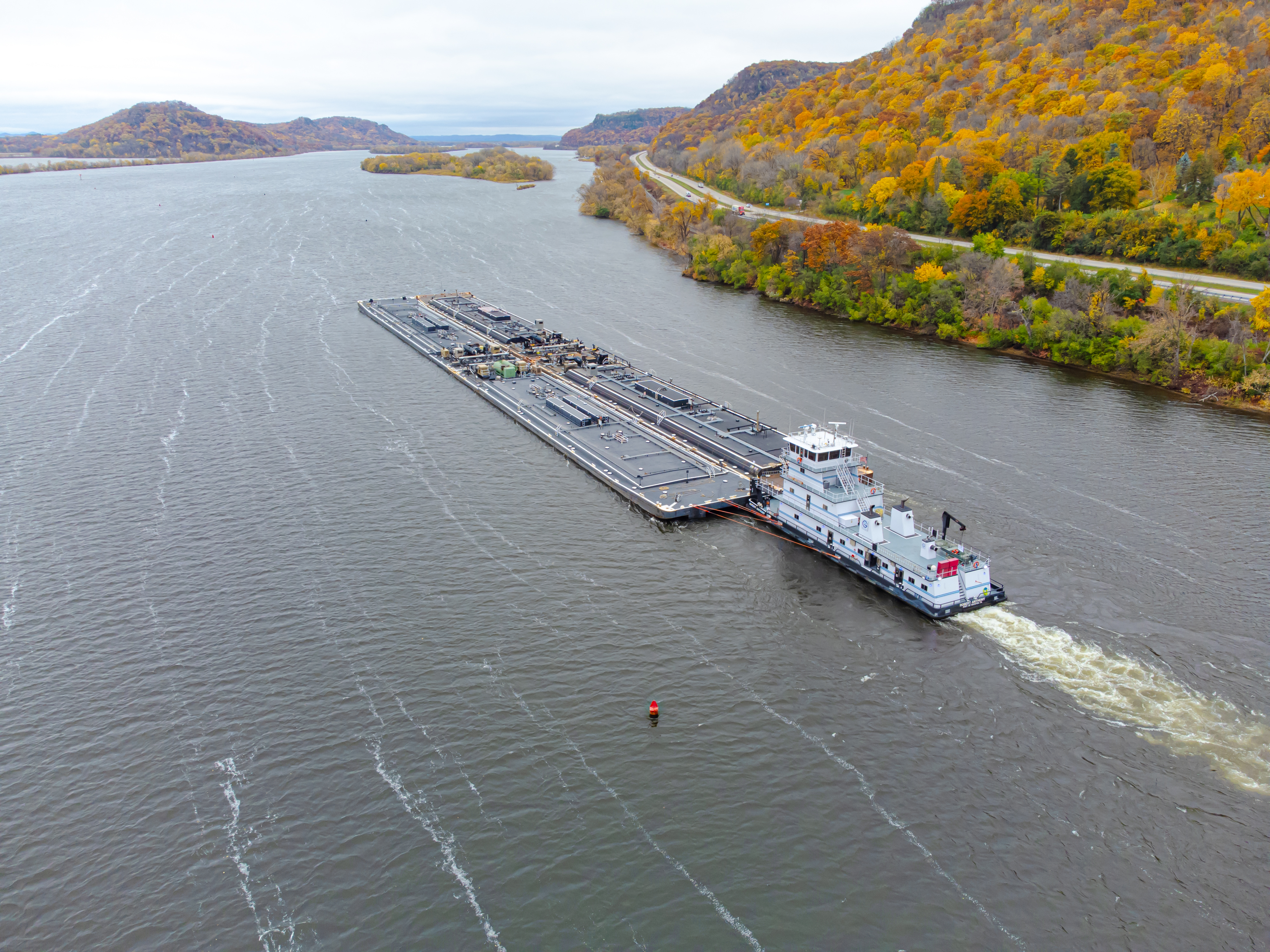
Mississippi barge petroleum tanker north of La Crosse. With U.S. 14/61 and the CP Railway running along the rivers edge.

The Upper Mississippi River spans around 1,250 miles (2,010 km) from Lake Itasca in Minnesota to Cairo, Illinois. Most of the Upper Mississippi goes through the center of the Driftless Area, around 15,000 sq mi (39,000 km^{2}) in Minnesota, Wisconsin, Iowa, and Illinois that has managed to stay free of glacial flows covering the past two million years. The Driftless Area is defined by a multitude of limestone bluffs that have been molded all the way since the last ice age, due to water melting from glaciers. The bottom of the river is composed of a thin layer of clay, silt, loam, and sand, which lay above a stratum of glacial outwash.

The Upper Mississippi River covers approximately half of the Mississippi River's length. About 850 miles (1,370 km) of the river is navigable from Minneapolis-St. Paul (specifically, the Coon Rapids Dam in the City of Coon Rapids, MN) to the Ohio River. The river sustains a large variety of aquatic life, including 127 species of fish and 30 species of freshwater mussels.

=== Arkansas River ===
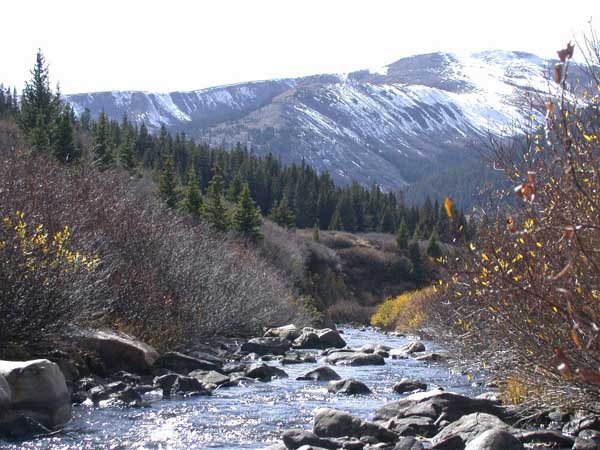
The headwaters of the Arkansas near Leadville, Colorado

The Arkansas River is one of the major tributaries in the Mississippi River system. It flows west to east starting in Colorado and dumping into the Mississippi River. Its length of 1,469 miles (2,364 km) allows it to flow through Colorado, Kansas, Oklahoma, and Arkansas. It is the sixth-longest river in the US, the second-longest tributary to the Mississippi River System, and the 45th longest river in the world.

=== Illinois River ===
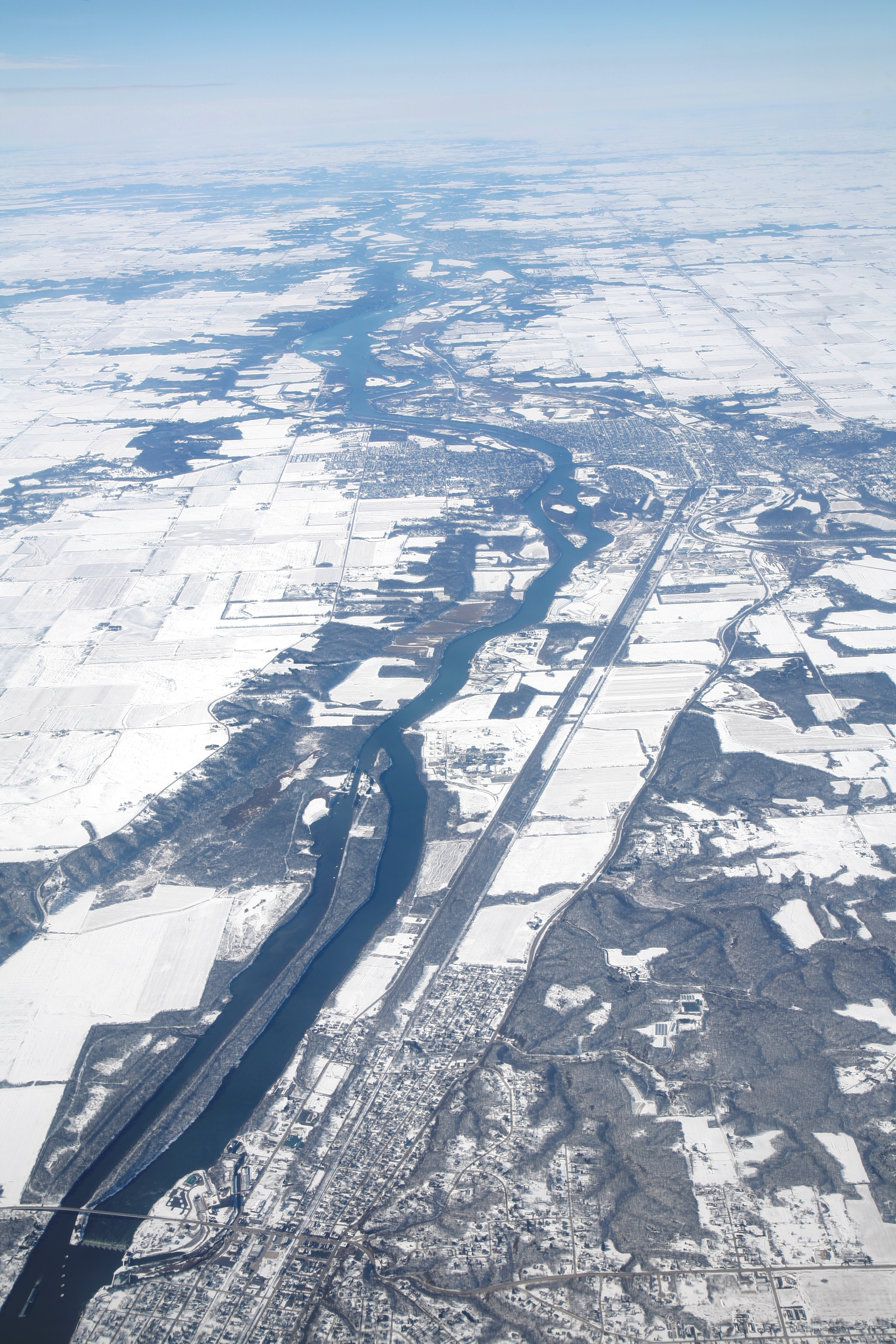
Aerial view of the Illinois River

The Illinois River is a principal tributary of the Mississippi River. The river runs approximately 273 miles (439 km) long, in the U.S. state of Illinois. This river was important among Native Americans and early French traders as the principal water route connecting the Great Lakes with the Mississippi. The Illinois River meets the Mississippi at Pere Marquette State Park, which is near Grafton.

The Illinois River is relatively shallow, just like the Mississippi. In addition, the Illinois River is a "managed" river, just as the Mississippi River is. In 1848, the Illinois and Michigan Canal opened to connect Lake Michigan with the Mississippi River through the Illinois River to promote commerce.

=== Missouri River ===
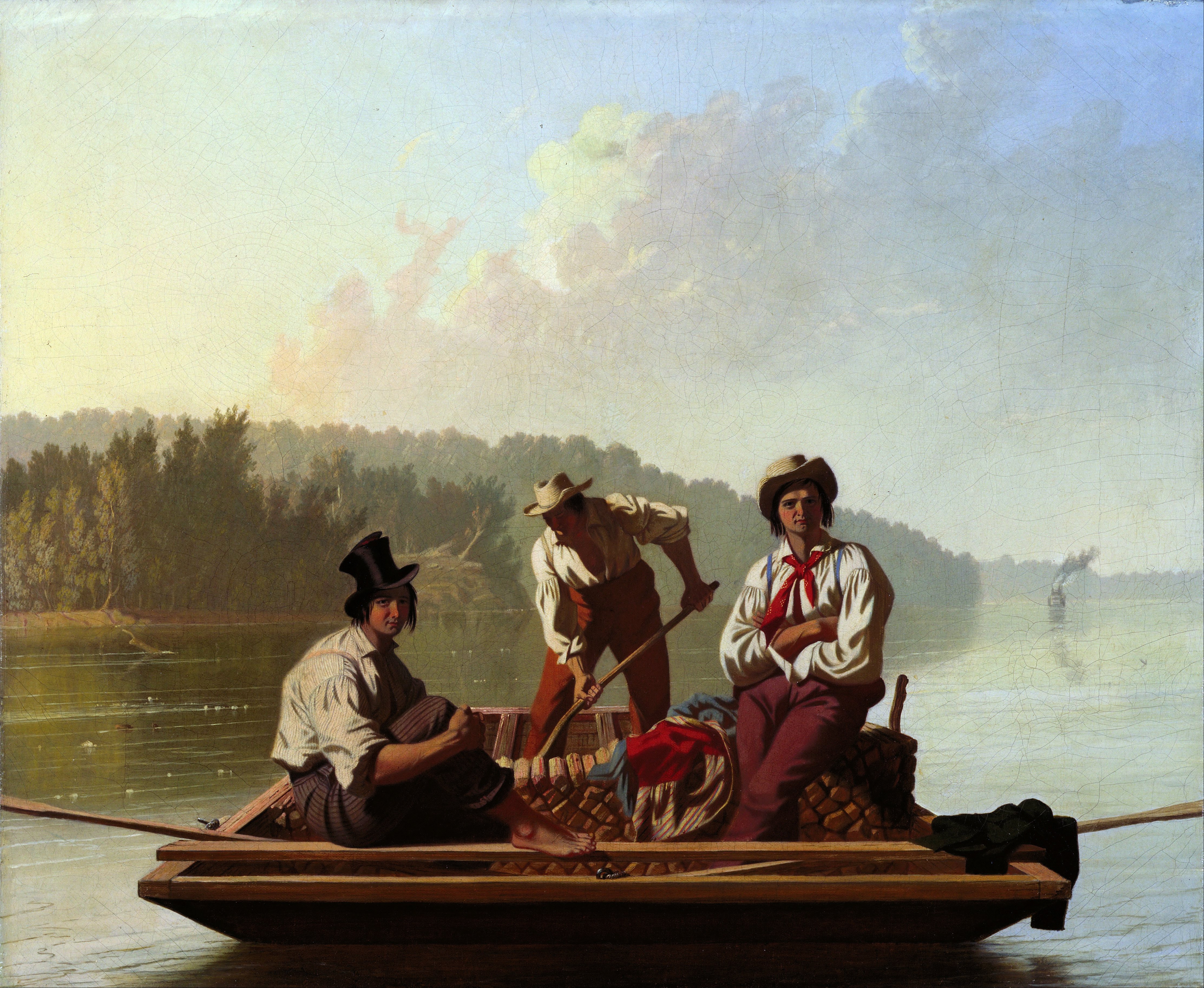
Boatmen on the Missouri c. 1846

The Missouri River is a long stream that originates in southwest Montana and flows southeasterly for 2,522 miles (4,059 km); passing through six states before finally entering the Mississippi River at St. Louis. The Missouri River is the longest river on the North American continent. The Missouri River was one of the main routes for the westward expansion of the United States during the 19th century.

=== Ohio River ===
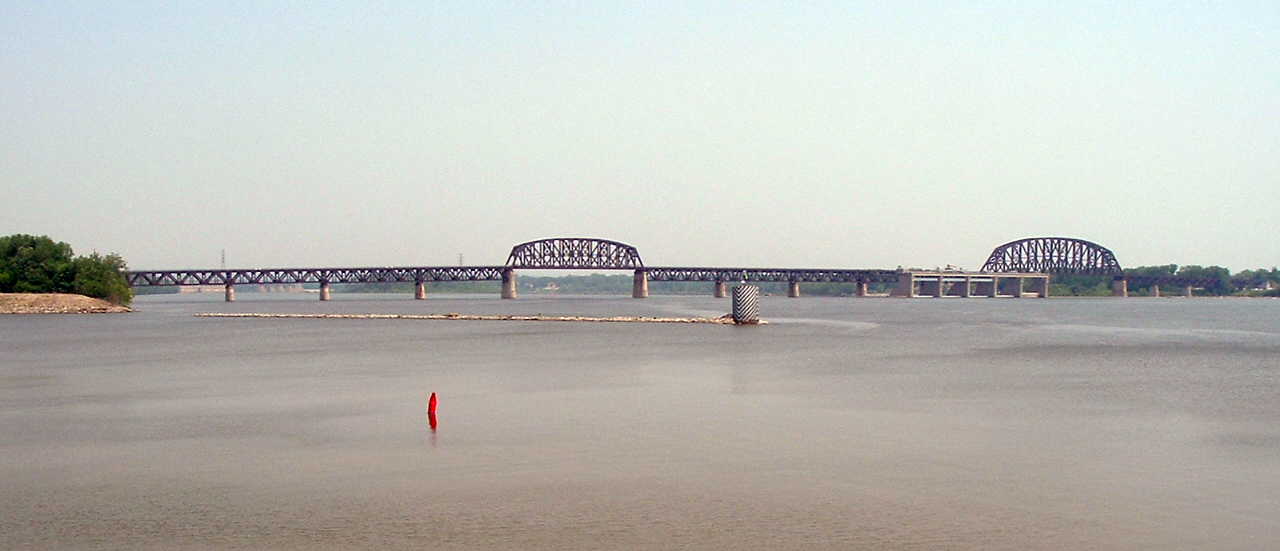
The widest point of the Ohio River near Louisville

The Ohio River runs 981 miles (1582 km) long, starting at the meeting of the Allegheny River and the Monongahela River in Pittsburgh, Pennsylvania; ending in Cairo, Illinois, where it then flows into the Mississippi. The Ohio River drains portions of eight states, including, Illinois, Indiana, New York, Ohio, Kentucky, Pennsylvania, Tennessee, and West Virginia.

The river has the capacity to provide enough water for over five million people. It is one mile wide at Smithland dam, the widest point of the river. The depth varies, due to the dams; from its origin point to Cincinnati, it averages approximately 27 feet (8.2 m) before deepening to a maximum 168 feet (51 m) near Louisville, Kentucky. These deeper waters allows multiple species of fish to thrive.

The water is also home to 150 species of fish ranging from catfish to certain species of salmon and trout. The depth also allows for commerce throughout the river on barges. On average the Ohio River transports over 230 million tons of cargo. Typically, the cargo being shipped are energy resources such as coal. These resources account for 70% of the cargo. Along with shipping energy resources, the Ohio River also creates energy with dams and other power-generating facilities. There are 20 dams and 49 other power generating facilities along the Ohio River.

=== Red River of the South ===
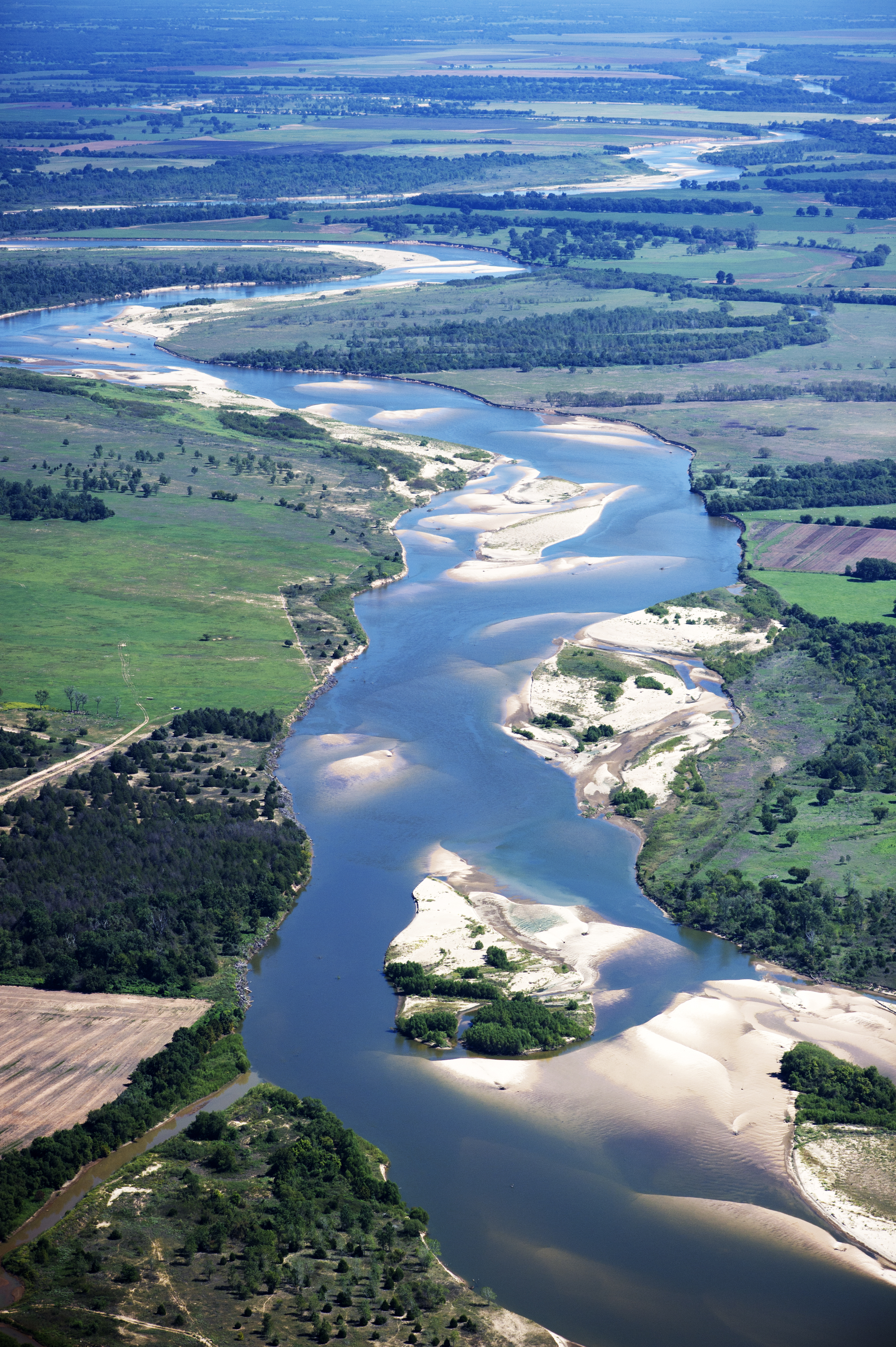
Red River near Bonham, Texas on the Texas-Oklahoma border

The Red River of the South is the 10th longest river in the United States with a length of 1,290 miles (2,080 km). It originates right outside of the Rocky Mountains and stretches through multiple states with the main portion of it located in Texas. The river also crosses through Oklahoma, Arkansas, and Louisiana where then it links into the Mississippi River. The Red River is mostly surrounded by rural farm land with the only surrounding major cities being Shreveport, Louisiana and Alexandria, Louisiana. The Red River is home to many oil fields with oil and gas production being one of the river's major aspects. The Red River is salty because of ancient seas that covered the area.

== Major distributaries ==
=== Mississippi River Delta ===
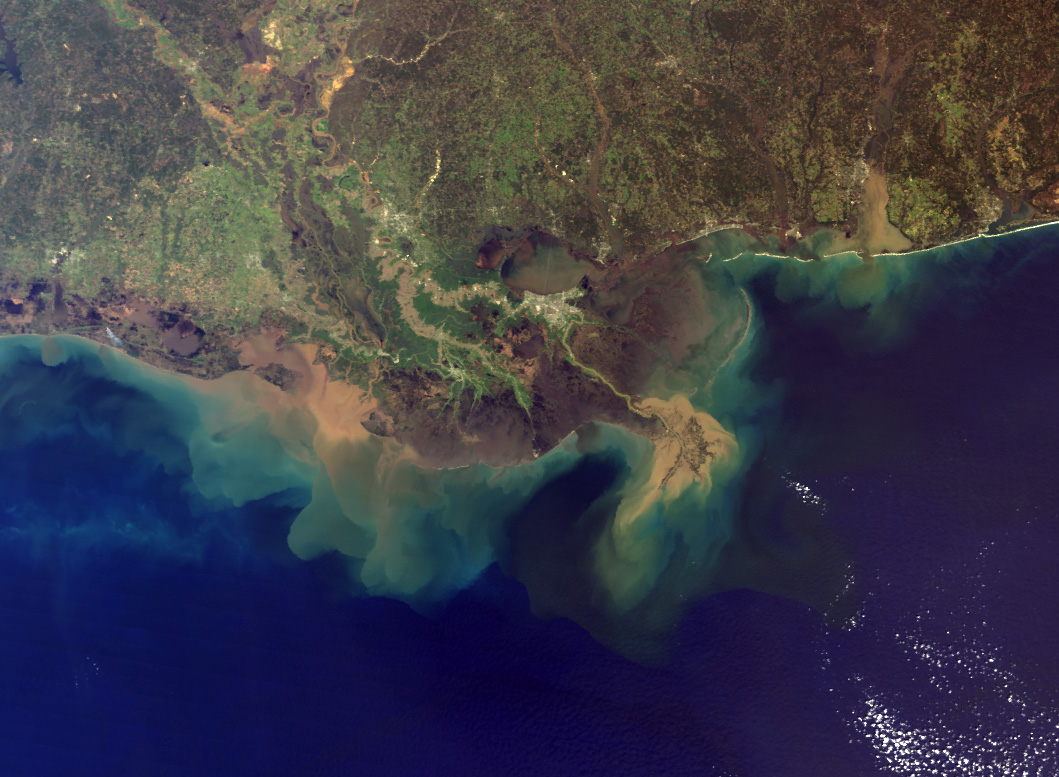
Mississippi River Delta and Sediment Plume

The Mississippi River Delta was created from thousands of years of sand, clay and organic material being deposited by the Mississippi River into the northern parts of the Gulf of Mexico. The delta is home to massive amounts of wildlife, and attributed to the U.S. success as a superpower because of the economic development the delta has provided for the country.

Over the last three centuries, the delta has continuously collapsed, due to human alterations of the river system. Natural protection of land is exacerbated the more the delta diminishes. The delta is important to the wildlife and people that it supports, along with the US economy. If the land loss continues at the pace it is going, all these benefits can vanish.

=== Atchafalaya River ===
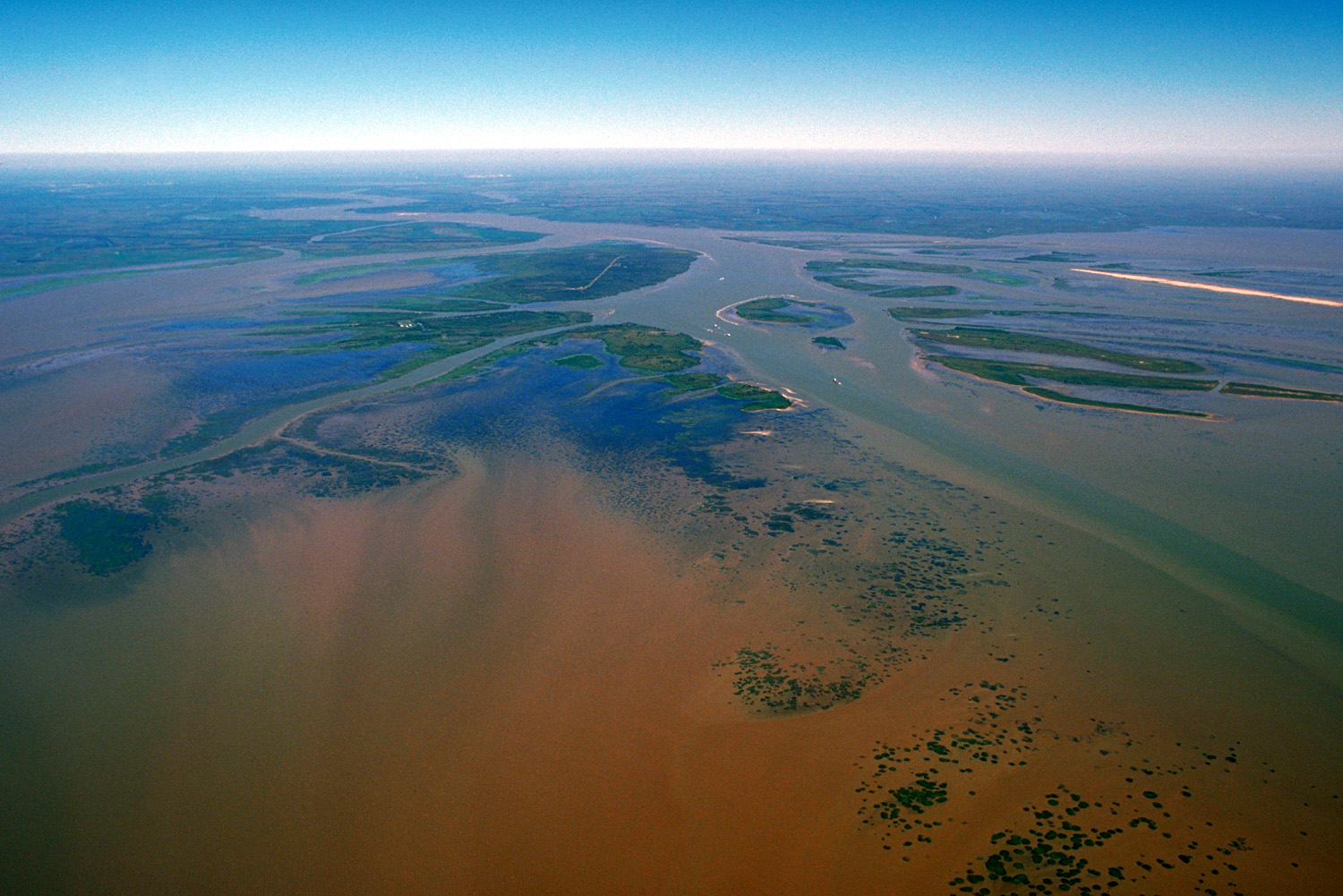
Atchafalaya River delta

The Atchafalaya River is one of the major distributaries in the Mississippi River System. It flows 170 miles (270 km), making it one of the longest distributaries of the Mississippi River. The name of the river translated into English is "long river", which derives from the Native American word. The river is important for commerce because it shortens the distance to the Gulf of Mexico, also saving companies time and money.

The Old River Control Structure diverts a portion of the flow of the Mississippi River into the Atchafalaya River. The diversion is regulated to allow 30% of the combined flow of the Mississippi and Red Rivers to pass down the Atchafalaya River with the remaining flow continuing down the Mississippi River.

== Historical use ==
The river system has always played a pivotal role in the lives of those who inhabit the surrounding area. Several different Native American groups lived in the surrounding area, including the Ojibwa, Ho-Chunk, Meskwaki, and Choctaw Native Americans. The abundance of resources and overall size attracted these individuals to settle near the water. They named the Mississippi River. It was used for assisting with agriculture, gathering fish, and trading with others.

The majority of natives to the river area were hunters and gatherers. The largest users of the rivers were the civilization today referred to as the Mound Builders, which created major farming settlements along the rivers. The silts deposited by the water made the surrounding areas very desirable and an ideal place to farm due to the extremely fertile location. It is unknown as to why earth mounds were constructed, but there is speculation that they possibly were used for religious and ceremonial purposes.

The river system, especially the Mississippi River, was used by Union armies as a means of invading and was host to several large battles during the U.S. Civil War. Mark Twain is regarded as having a large impact on molding U.S. literature into what it is today because of his profound works on adventures and life on the rivers.

== Modern use ==
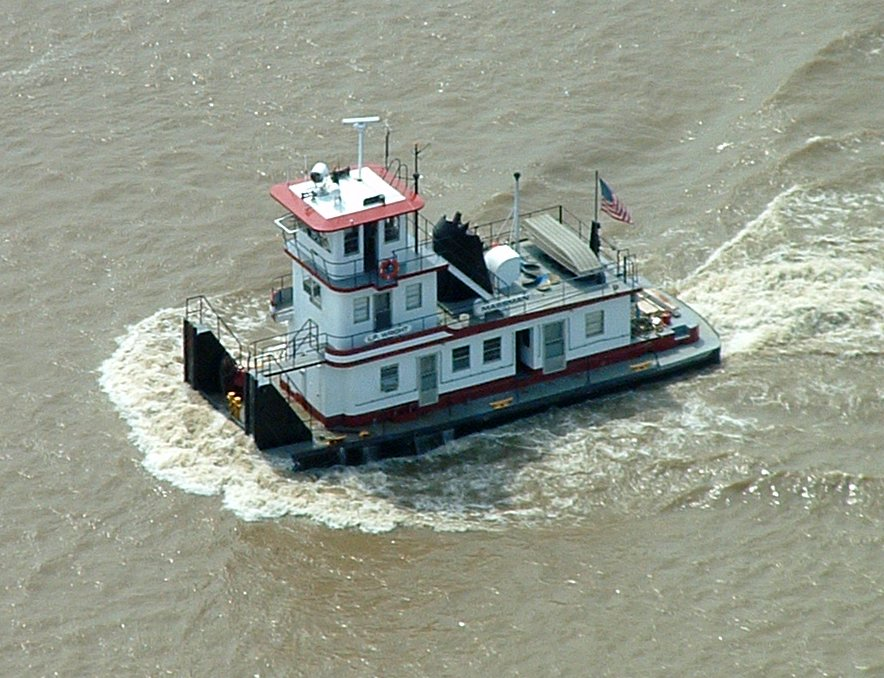
Tugboat operating on the Mississippi River

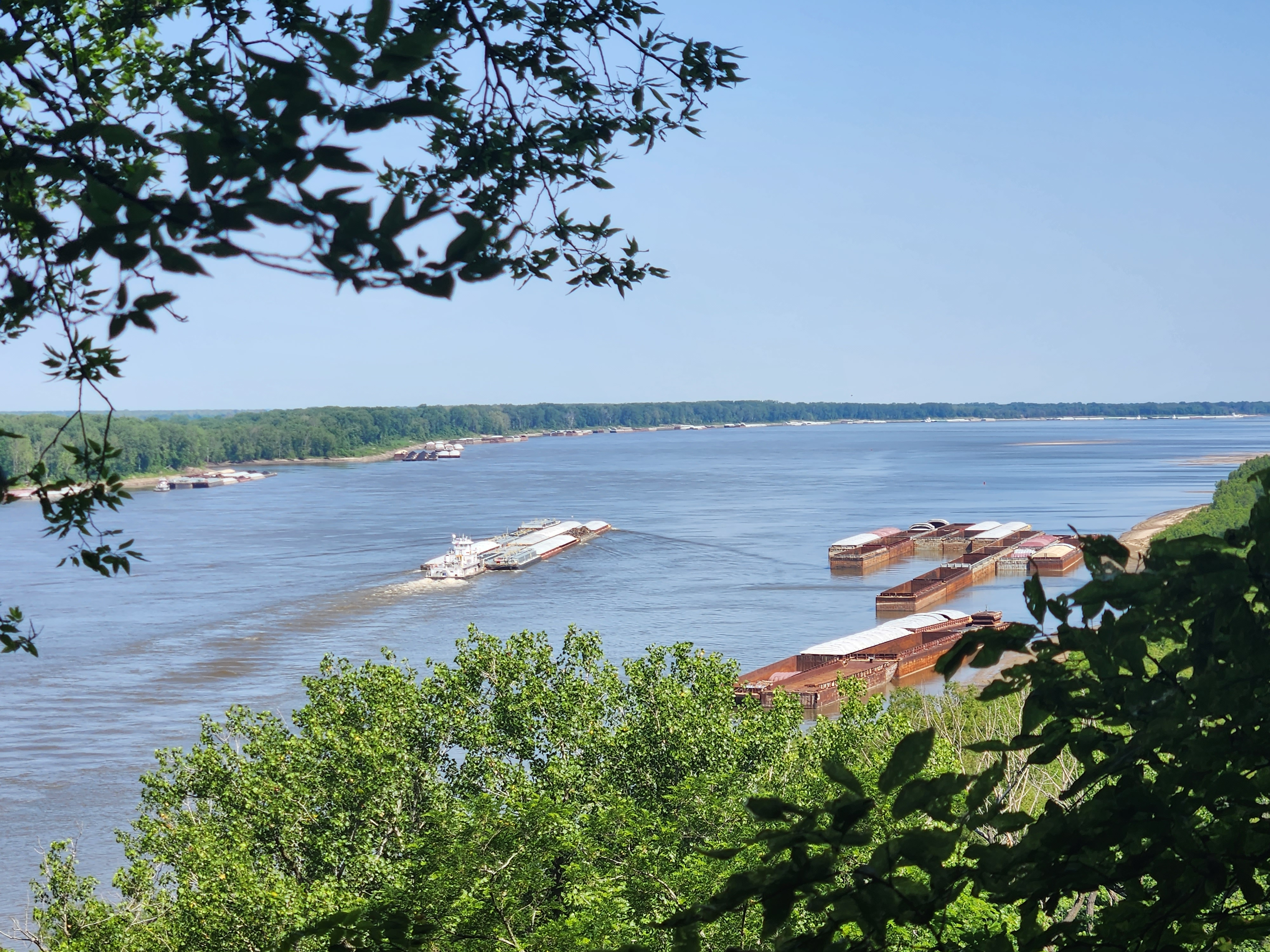
Barge traveling on the Mississippi River

Today, the Mississippi River System, along with its connecting tributaries, is primarily used for transporting agricultural and manufactured goods across the span of the country. Among these goods is iron, steel, and mine products. Over 460 million short tons (420 million metric tons) is shipped on the Mississippi each year. The most common form of cargo transportation on the system is by tugboats pushing along large barges.

== Commerce ==
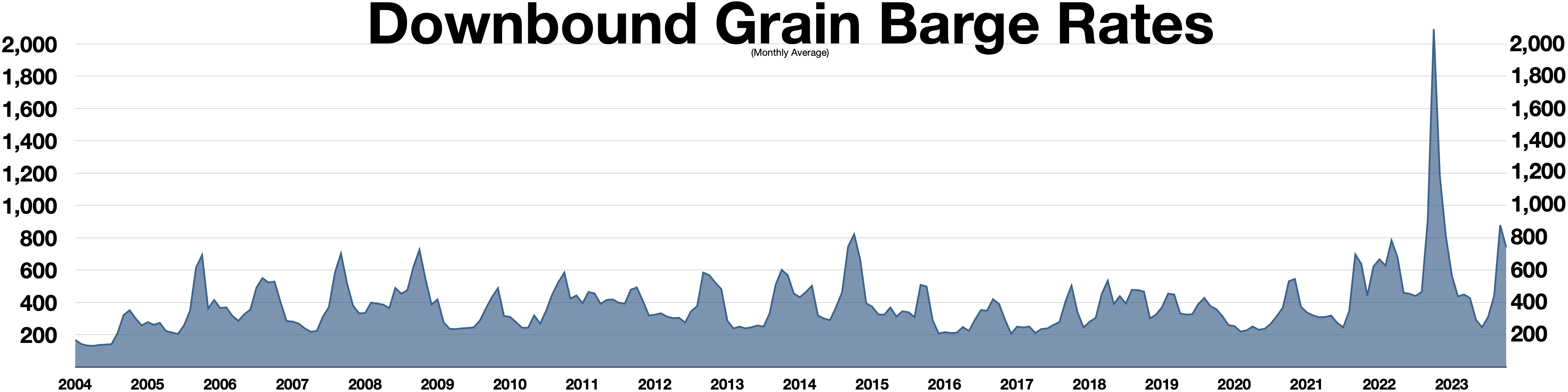
Downbound barge rates In late 2022 there was low river levels that caused two backups on the Lower Mississippi River that held up over 100 tow boats with 2,000 barge units and caused barge rates to soar

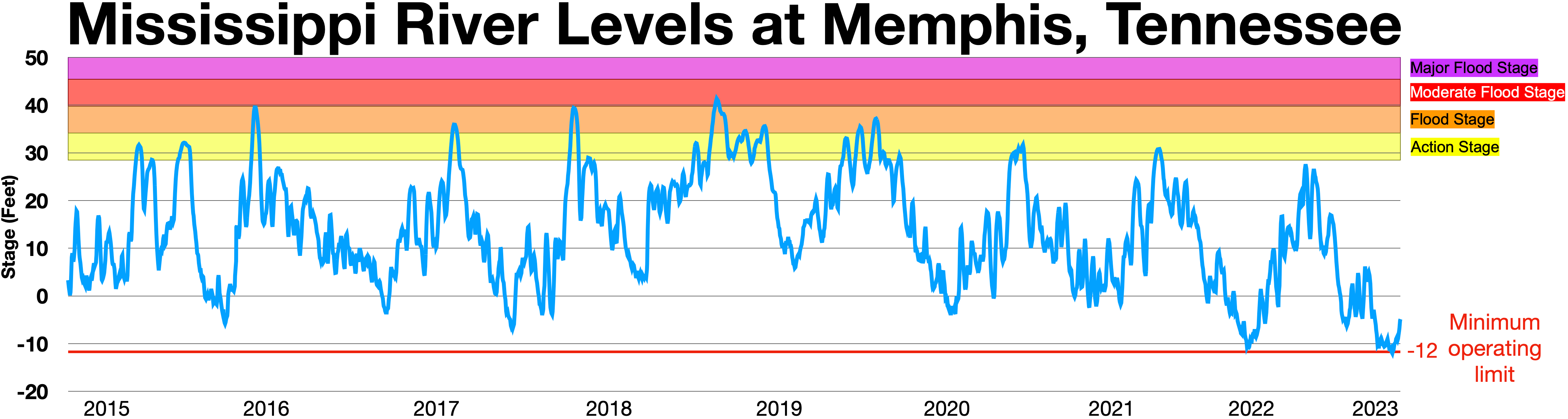
Mississippi River levels at Memphis, Tennessee Major flood stage Moderate flood stage Flood stage Action stage River levels Minimum operating limit (-12 feet)

The Mississippi River System is a huge provider for the U.S. economy. It accounts for 92% of the nation's agricultural exports and 78% of the world's feed grains and soybeans. It also houses some of the biggest ports in the U.S. like the Port of South Louisiana and The Port of New Orleans.

These two ports account for over 500 million tons of shipped goods per year which is significantly larger than most ports in the United States. Some common things that are shipped include petroleum, iron, steel, grain, rubber, paper, wood, coffee, coal, chemicals, and edible oils.

=== Goods movement ===
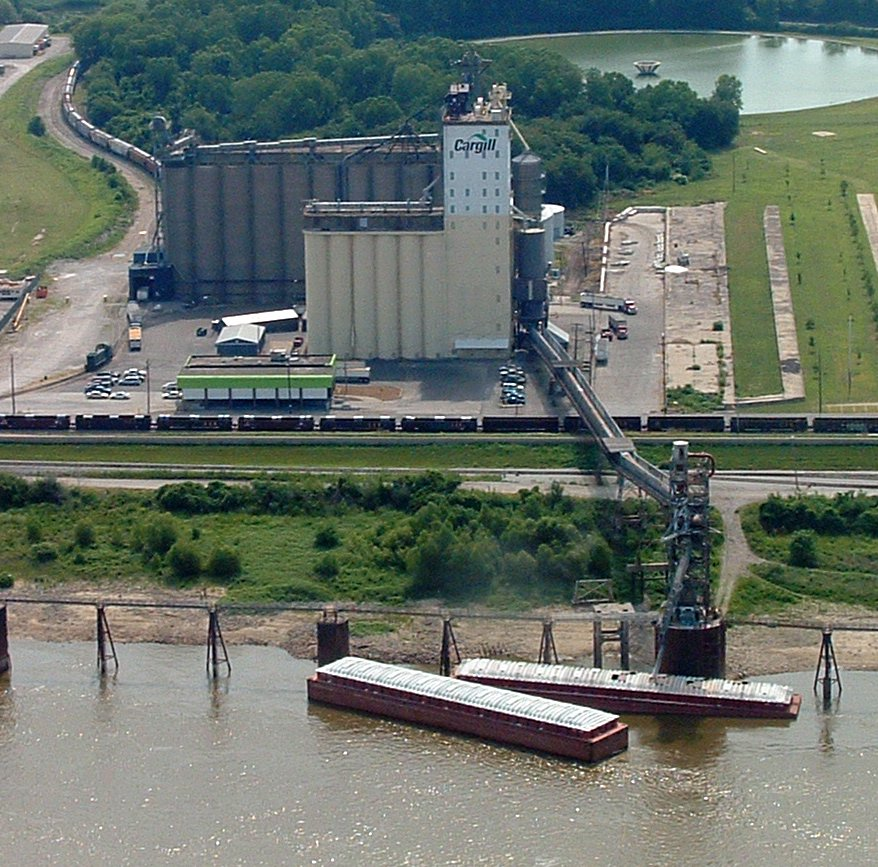
Cargill grain elevator and terminal

The commodities moved on the Mississippi River in 1999 included the following:

Upbound commodities
Commodity	Percentage
Sand and gravel	47%
Fertilizer	24%
Salt	9%
Cement	10%
Misc.	10%

Downbound Commodities
Commodity	Percentage
Grain (soy, corn, and wheat)	87%
Asphalt	4%
Potash	3%
Misc.	6%

== Ecology ==
=== Natural history ===
About two billion years ago, environmental tension altered the environment around the Mississippi River System basin, creating the mountain systems in North America. Erosion put further stress on the areas within the rivers, shaping depressions in the ground. Many years after this, the land continued to be molded into the Mississippi River System due to the overflowing of water from nearby oceans, causing constant flooding. Around two million years ago, glaciers up to 1.2 miles (1.9 km) thick continued to disturb the environment. The receding formation of glaciers 15,000 years ago, at the end of the last ice age, left large amounts of water in North America, which created the rivers.

The Mississippi River stemmed from Lake Itasca in northern Minnesota where it was only a tiny outlet stream. It worked its way 2,350 miles (3,780 km) south to the Gulf of Mexico. Today, the Mississippi River is connected to hundreds of tributaries making up the Mississippi River System.

=== Wildlife ===
The Mississippi River and its floodplain are home to a diverse number of species. There are at least 260 different species of fish throughout the Mississippi. Forty percent of the United States' migratory waterfowl use the Mississippi River corridor during the Spring and Fall migration. Sixty percent of all North American birds (326 species) use the river Basin as their migratory flyway. There are 38 documented species of mussel that can be found from Cairo, IL and upstream to Lake Itasca.

There may be as many as 60 different species of mussel found on the lower part of the Mississippi. More than 50 mammal species have made the Upper Mississippi their home, along with at least 145 species of amphibians and reptiles in the Upper Mississippi environs.

=== Human impacts ===
The biggest impact that humans have on the Mississippi River System comes in the form of pollution. Efforts made by the government to regulate and prevent more pollution from entering the waterways have stopped some, but regardless, pollution is still finding its way into the water. Fertilizers and insecticides have been swept away into the water, tampering with the environments ecosystems.

The Mississippi has entered the twenty-first century as a system deeply altered by human actions. Accelerated runoff and accelerated sediment loads, which are associated with running water, have greatly impacted the system due to erosion affecting topsoil in agriculturally heavy areas.

=== Flooding ===
In 1993, the Mississippi River flood devastated seventeen thousand square miles of land, spanning across nine states. It was the worst flooding epidemic in the history of the United States. It is also referred to as a hundred year flood because the likelihood for it to occur is one in one hundred in any year. Over fifty people died due to the flooding, as well as profound home damage and economic losses totaling $10–12 billion ($20–$25 billion in 2022). Twenty percent of the population that surrounded the flood area have since left due to economic hardship or personal troubles.

The Army Corps of Engineers currently oversees all the responsibilities of making sure the rivers are best maintained to avoid more flooding. They abide by their goals of to "straighten, channelize, regularize and shackle the Mississippi." In order to subside the potential of more flooding, the Corps created levees, divided by a mile each, to restrict the river and control the flooding. Due to the manner in which the levees were paved, the river is unable to erode the shore. There are several floodways throughout the system to prevent a large amount of water from amassing. Instead, the buildup of water goes through these floodways. While they help prevent flooding, they also inhibit agriculture from prospering in some of the surrounding areas.

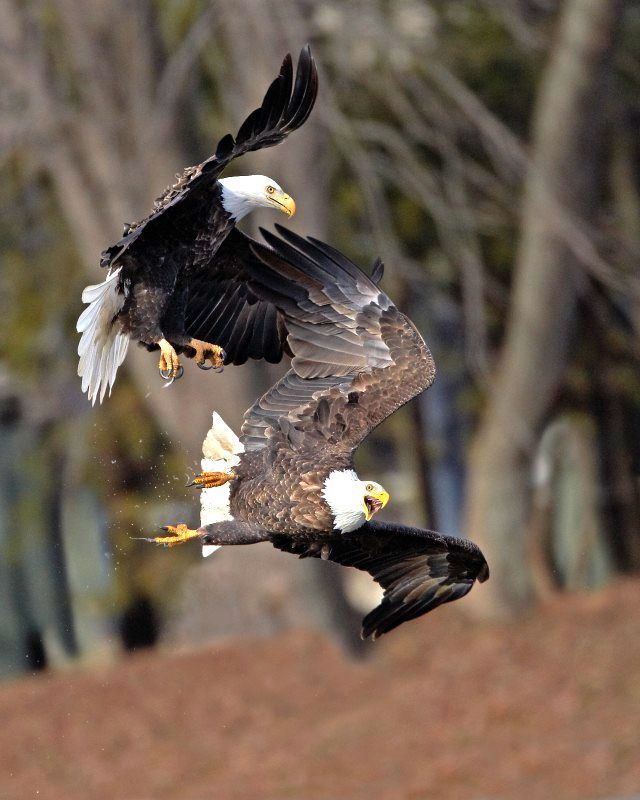
Eagles compete for food at Upper Mississippi River National Wildlife Refuge

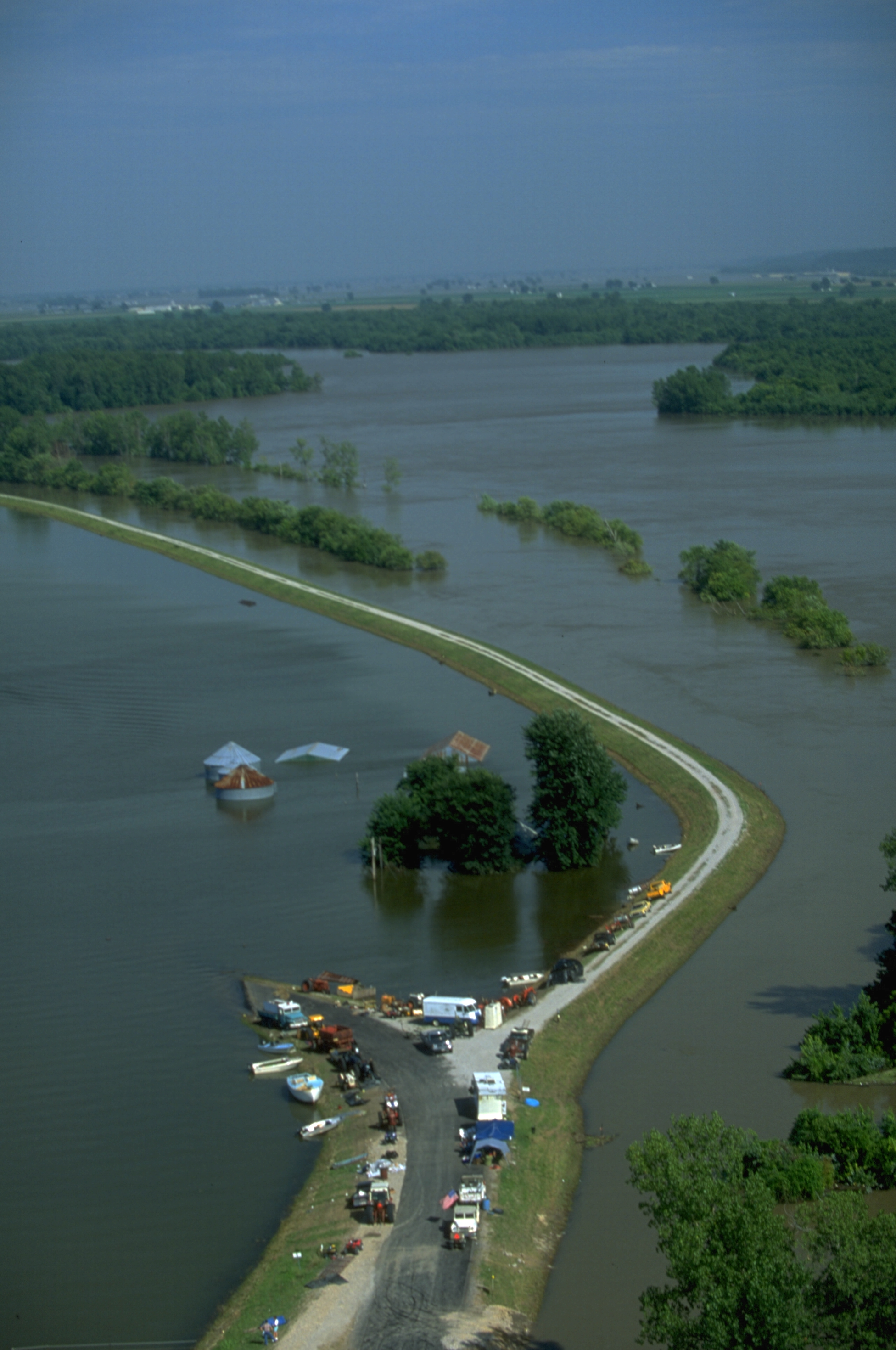
Floodwater damage in Perryville, Missouri, 1993

== See also ==
- Lower Mississippi River
