= Missouri Headwaters State Park =

State park in Montana, US

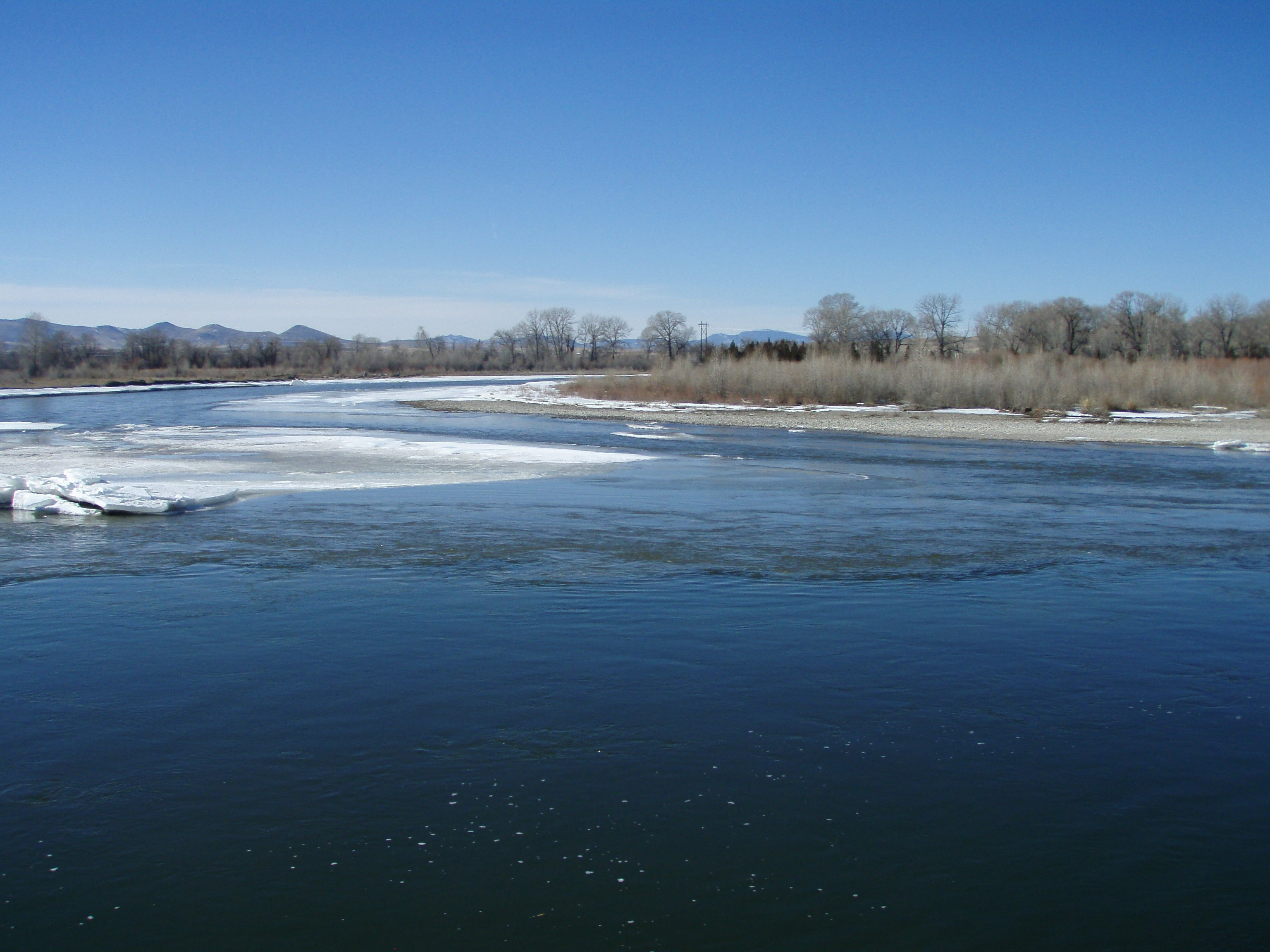
- Confluence of the Madison River and Jefferson River at the starting point of the Missouri River

- Location within Montana
- Location: Gallatin County, Montana, United States
- Nearest city: Three Forks, Montana
- Coordinates: 45°55′15″N 111°29′53″W
- Area: 532 acres (215 ha)
- Elevation: 4,049 feet (1,234 m)
- Designation: Montana state park
- Established: 1947
- Visitors: 33,436 (in 2023)
- Administrator: Montana Fish, Wildlife & Parks
- Website: Missouri Headwaters State Park
- Three Forks of the Missouri
- U.S. National Register of Historic Places
- U.S. National Historic Landmark
- Location within Montana Location within the United States
- Location: Gallatin County, Montana
- Area: 1,500 acres (610 ha)
- Built: 1805
- NRHP reference No.: 66000433

Significant dates
- Added to NRHP: October 15, 1966
- Designated NHL: October 9, 1960

Missouri Headwaters State Park is a public recreation area occupying 535 acres (217 ha) at the site of the official start of the Missouri River. The park offers camping, hiking trails, hunting, and water-related activities. It is located on Trident Road northeast of Three Forks, Montana at an elevation of 4,045 feet (1,233 m). The park includes the Three Forks of the Missouri National Historic Landmark, designated in 1960 because the site is one where the Lewis and Clark Expedition camped in 1805.

== Setting ==
The bulk of Missouri Headwaters State Park is found on a peninsula flanked on the east by the Gallatin River and the west by the Missouri River and the Madison River. Small parts of the park are also located on the east bank of the Gallatin River, and an island in the Missouri just below the confluence of the Madison and Jefferson Rivers. The total park size is 532 acres (215 ha). The Jefferson River meets the Madison and Missouri roughly midway through the park's north-south extent.

== History ==
The Lewis and Clark Expedition encamped at the confluence site on July 26, 1805. On July 28, Meriwether Lewis wrote in his journal:

"Both Capt. C. and myself corrisponded in opinion with rispect to the impropriety of calling either of these [three] streams the Missouri and accordingly agreed to name them after the President of the United States and the Secretaries of the Treasury and state..."

The expedition were likely the first white men to ever penetrate this landscape. Lewis and Clark were at first uncertain how to proceed, and scouted each of the branches before ultimately departing on July 30 up the Jefferson River. The expedition also passed the forks on its return journey on July 13, 1806.

As the west was explored and developed through the 19th century, the forks area was frequently used as a camp site by fur trappers. Acquisition for the state park was begun by preservation organizations in the 1960s.

== Claims of Missouri River source ==
The Lewis and Clark decision not to call the Jefferson the Missouri has spurred debate over what is the longest river in North America, since the Missouri and Mississippi are nearly identical in length. The Missouri traditionally had been called the longest river in North America. However, 72 miles of it have been trimmed off in re-channeling its streambed—mainly for the many hydroelectric power plants in the region— so that it is now sometimes referred as second to the Mississippi in terms of length. If the Jefferson were included in the Missouri length, it would technically still be considered the longest river by experts of the United States Geological Survey.

The utmost headwaters of the Missouri are subject to debate but two commonly claimed locations ultimately drain into the Jefferson. Lewis on August 12, 1805 said he visited the headwaters on Trail Creek just above Lemhi Pass on the Continental Divide in the Beaverhead Mountains at around 8,600 feet which he described:

the most distant fountain of the waters of the mighty Missouri in surch(sic) of which we have spent so many toilsome days and wristless(sic) nights.

In 1888 Jacob V. Brower, who had championed turning the headwaters of the Mississippi River into a Minnesota state park, visited another site which today is also claimed to be the furthest point on the Missouri. Brower published his finding in 1896 in "The Missouri: Its Utmost Source."

Brower's Spring, as the site is now known, is at around 8,800 feet in the Centennial Mountains. The site is commemorated by a rock pile at the source of Hellroaring Creek which flows into Red Rock River and then into Clark Canyon Reservoir where it joins the Beaverhead then the Big Hole River before ultimately hooking up with the Jefferson.

== See also ==
- List of National Historic Landmarks in Montana
- National Register of Historic Places listings in Gallatin County, Montana
