= Sawtell Peak =

Mountain in Idaho, United States

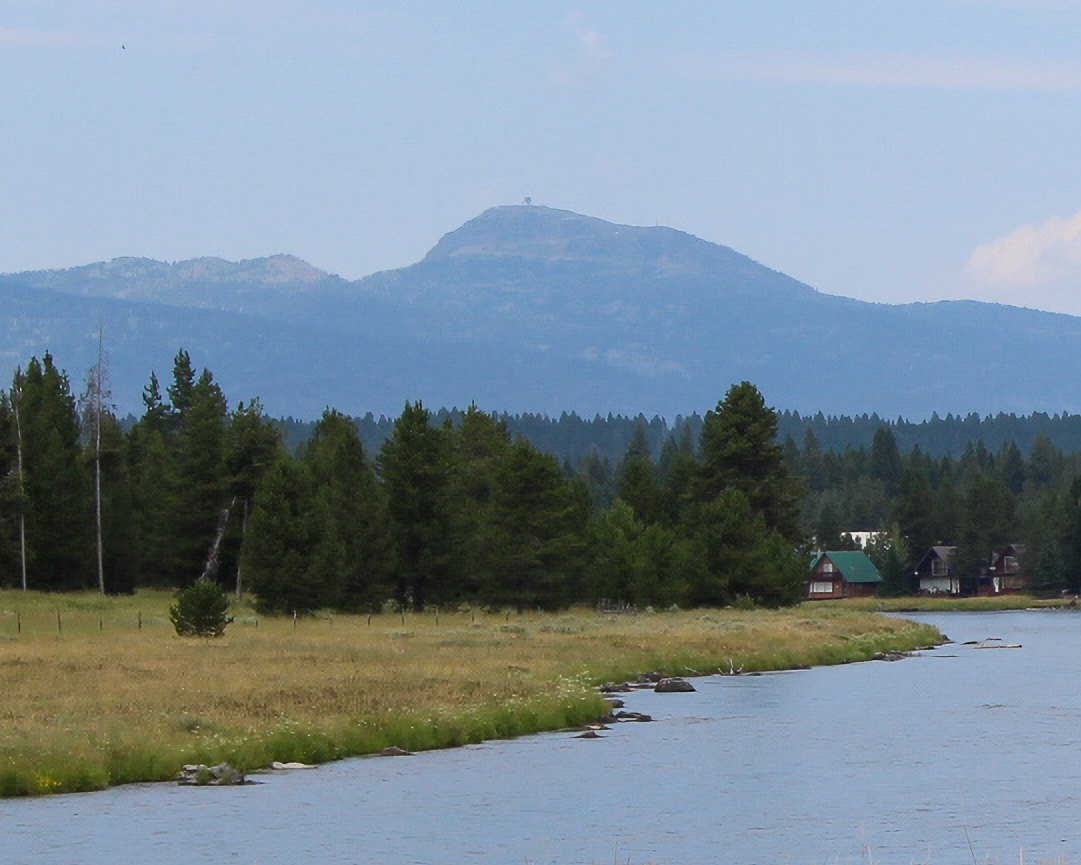
- Sawtell Peak from Last Chance, Idaho

Highest point
- Elevation: 9,884 ft (3,013 m)
- Prominence: 920 ft (280 m)
- Coordinates: 44°33′45″N 111°26′41″W

Geography
- Location within Idaho
- Location: Fremont County, Idaho, U.S.
- Parent range: Centennial Mountains
- Topo map: USGS Sawtell Peak

Sawtell Peak, also spelled Sawtelle Peak is a mountain in the U.S. state of Idaho. It is located in the eastern portion of the Centennial Mountains. Sawtell Peak is located in the Caribou-Targhee National Forest roughly 1.3 miles (2.1 km) east of Idaho's border with Montana.

The summit is located near Henrys Lake and Big Springs, headwaters of the Henrys Fork of the Snake River as well as Brower's Spring, headwaters of the Missouri River, both of which being located near the Continental Divide. It was named after Gilman Sawtell, who settled the Island Park area in 1868. There are two ridges, the north one being much less accessible.

Sawtell Peak is the starting point of the easiest route to climb nearby Mount Jefferson.

== Geology ==
Sawtell Peak is the easternmost peak in the Centennial Range, which run east to west, contrary to many other fault block ranges in the Basin and Range Province. This east to west structure is likely due to movement with the Yellowstone Hotspot. The mountain and surrounding area is covered by block lava flows that are approximately 1,000 feet (300 m) thick on top of underlying strata from the Paleozoic era. This strata is by cut by feeder dikes. North of Sawtell Peak and the Centennial Range are canyons that were once heavily glaciated.

== Flora and Fauna ==
The surrounding area contains the same wildlife as the Greater Yellowstone Ecosystem. The lower reaches of Sawtell Peak contain meadows filled with sagebrush and native grasses. Evergreen forests fill the midsection of it, with flowers blooming toward the end of summer. Some of these flowers include Indian paintbrush, western columbine, and varieties of sunflower.

Big game such as white tail deer can be found in the forest on slopes of Sawtell Peak. There are also birds, such as western tanager and small game like the marmot. Grizzly bears can also be seen on occasion.

== Communication ==
Sawtell Peak is used for communications for various agencies and organizations. The Federal Aviation Administration (FAA) operates a long-range radar site that has been tied into the Joint Surveillance System since the September 11th attacks. The radar is part of the Western Air Defense Sector, headquartered at Joint Base Lewis-McChord near Tacoma, Washington.

There is an amateur radio repeater near the summit that is linked to the Intermountain Intertie. This repeater provides coverage to portions of Yellowstone National Park, and the Intertie provides access to amateur radio operators to communicate as far south as Las Vegas, Nevada and Flagstaff, Arizona. Also near the summit is a translator for KBYI-FM, a radio station owned by Brigham Young University - Idaho and affiliated with National Public Radio.

== Recreation ==
Sawtell Peak can be accessed by a heavily trafficked road leading from US 20 south of Henrys Lake. The road is about 13 miles (21 km) long and involves a 3,440 feet (1,050 m) climb from US 20 to the summit. The road can be dangerous due to sudden snow storms. The snow can be up to 25 feet (7.6 m) deep and avalanches are a hazard. The road to the summit is closed from November 1 to June 1 but is maintained by the FAA. During the closure, the road is only accessible for personnel associated with the communications facilities at the top. Snowmobiling is not allowed on the road. There are no roads or trails leading to the north summit.

From the top, visitors can see Yellowstone, the Centennial Valley, the Teton Range in Wyoming and the Pioneer Mountains in Montana.

== See also ==
- Mount Jefferson
- Henrys Lake Mountains
- Henrys Lake
- Red Rock Pass
