= Lake Itasca =

Lake in Clearwater County, northern Minnesota, United States

- Omashkoozo-zaaga'igan (Ojibwe)
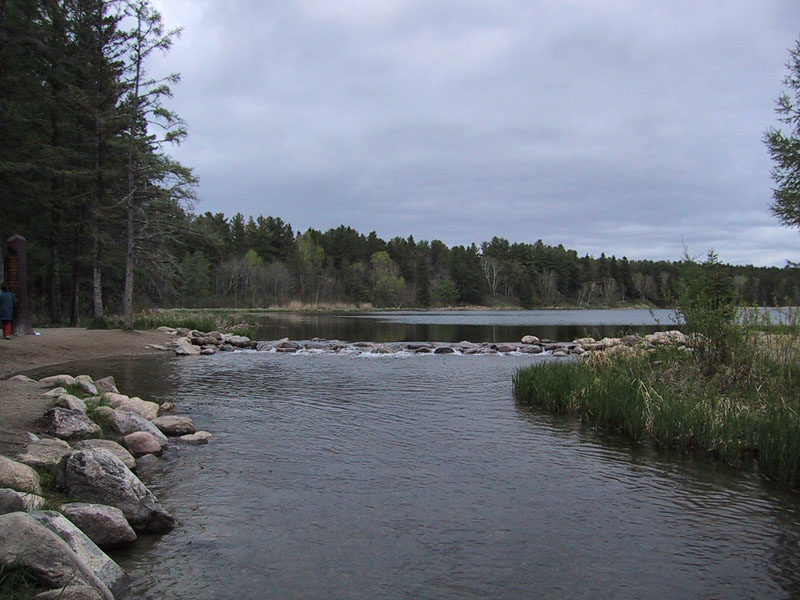
- The primary source of the Mississippi River on the edge of Lake Itasca

- Location within Minnesota Location within the United States
- Location: Itasca State Park, Clearwater County, Minnesota, US
- Coordinates: 47°13′05″N 95°12′26″W
- Type: Glacial
- Primary inflows: Nicolet Creek, Elk Lake outlet stream
- Primary outflows: Mississippi River
- Basin countries: United States
- Surface area: 1.8 sq mi (4.7 km^{2})
- Average depth: 20–35 ft (6–11 m)
- Surface elevation: 1,475 ft (450 m)
- Islands: Schoolcraft Island

Lake Itasca (/aɪˈtæskə/ eye-TASS-kə) is a glacial lake, approximately 4.7 square kilometres (470 hectares; 1,200 acres) in area. It is located in Itasca State Park, in south-eastern Clearwater County, in the Headwaters area of north-central Minnesota, and is the headwater of the Mississippi River. It has a depth range of 20 to 35 feet (5 to 10 m) and is 1,475 feet (450 m) above sea level.

The Ojibwe name for the lake is Omashkoozo-zaaga'igan (Elk Lake). The first European explorers in the area were French Canadian and they named the lake Lac Labiche (Doe Lake, often mistranslated as Elk Lake). The name was later changed by Henry Schoolcraft to "Itasca", coined from a combination of the dog Latin phrase veritas caput (intended to mean "true head [of the Mississippi]"). It is one of several examples of pseudo-Native American place names created by Schoolcraft.

== Source of the Mississippi River ==
The lake is the primary source (Note: The United States Geological Survey recognizes two contrasting definitions of a river's source. By the stricter definition, the Mississippi would share its source with its longest tributary, the Missouri, at Brower's Spring in Montana. The other definition acknowledges "somewhat arbitrary decisions" and places the Mississippi's sources at Lake Itasca, which is publicly accepted as the source of the Mississippi, identified as such by a late 1800s surveyor Brower.) of the Mississippi River which flows 2,340 mi (3,770 km) to the Gulf of Mexico. There are several tributaries that flow (most or all of the year) into the lake, one of which, by most modern definitions, as with the Nile River and Amazon River, would be considered the actual source, though less dramatic than the lake's outflow.

The western arm of the lake is fed by two streams on its south end. Nicollet Creek starts in a nearby spring. Another small stream leads into Itasca from Elk Lake, (Note: See the article on Julius Chambers on the discovery of Elk Lake.) which in turn is fed by two other streams. The Ojibwa called Elk Lake and the stream Bekegamaag-zaaga'igan and Bekegamaag-ziibi (Sidelake Lake and Sidelake River), respectively. In 1887, Williard Glazier promoted a campaign to consider Elk Lake, which he called Glazier Lake, as the true source of the Mississippi. Its longest tributary originates at Little Elk Lake, which is 100 ft (30 m) higher in elevation and 11 km upstream from the Lake Itasca outflow in the Mississippi watershed.

== History ==
Henry Schoolcraft identified Lake Itasca as the river's primary source in 1832. He had been part of a previous expedition in 1820 led by General Lewis Cass that had named nearby Cass Lake (which is downstream from Itasca) as the source of the river. There exists a dissenting claim that fur trader William Morrison was the first person to discover the lake and identified it as the source of the Mississippi in 1804.

Jacob V. Brower, a land surveyor and president of the Minnesota Historical Society, after spending five months exploring the lakes, claimed that the lakes and streams further south of Lake Itasca were not the true source of the Mississippi because they were "too small". Modern explorers and geographers, however, have used the tiniest trickles of water to determine the source of the Amazon, Nile, and other rivers. Brower campaigned aggressively to save the lake from logging. On April 21, 1891, the Minnesota Legislature officially made it a state park by a margin of one vote. Brower is now called the "Father of Lake Itasca," and the visitor center is named in his honor.

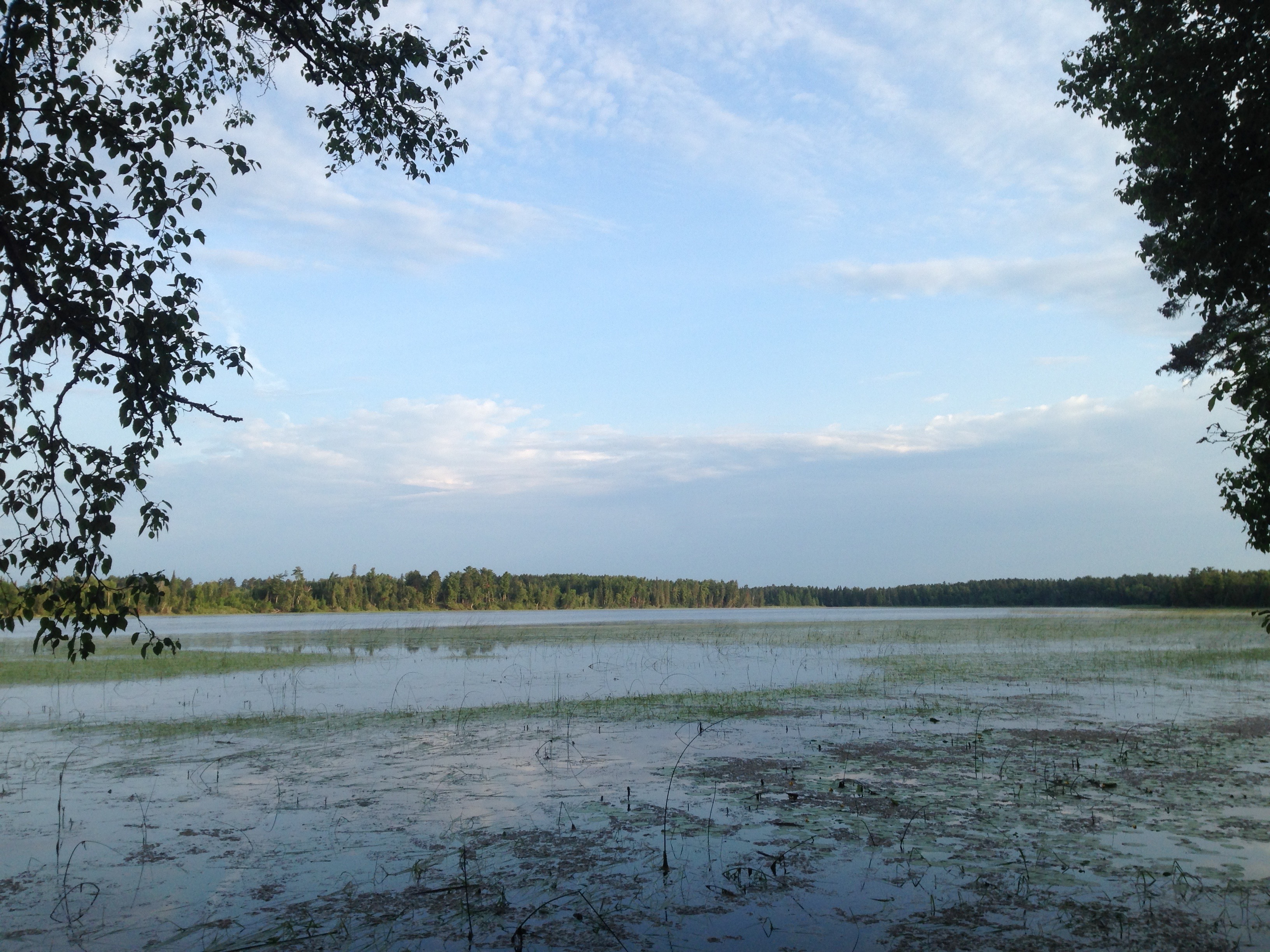
View of Lake Itasca, taken July 2015 Sunset over Lake Itasca, July 2018 Rayleigh scattering over Lake Itasca, June 2023

The channel of the Mississippi as it emerges from the lake was bulldozed in the 1930s by the Civilian Conservation Corps, to create a more "pleasant experience" for visitors. The project included the draining of the surrounding swamp, the digging of a new channel, and the installation of a man-made rock rapids. The rocks are used by tourists for walking across the Mississippi River. This outlet channel underwent restoration work in October of 2020. The channel was reshaped to direct water away from the shoreline, reducing erosive effects. The Minnesota DNR stabilized the shoreline with a combination of boulders and natural vegetation. Although the path of the stepping stones were reshaped, the underlying dam was unchanged.

== Scientific research ==
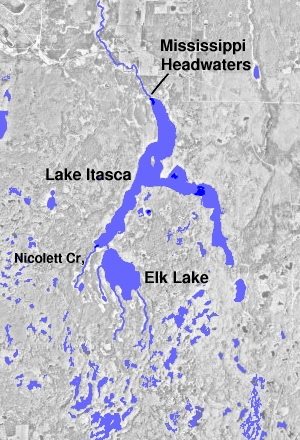
Lake Itasca and Elk Lake

The lake is home to the University of Minnesota's Itasca Biological Station and Laboratories campus. The campus was established in 1909.

== See also ==
- List of Minnesota lakes
- USRC Itasca (1907)
- USCGC Itasca (1929)
