= Bitterroot Range =

Sub-range of the Rocky Mountains in the northwestern United States

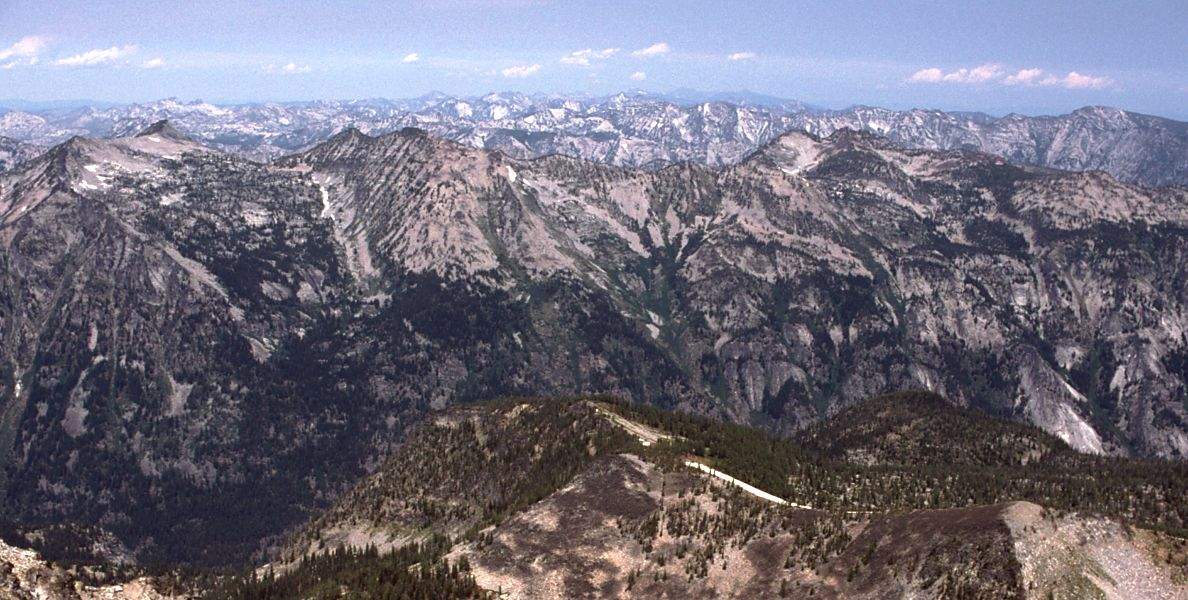
- Part of the Bitterroot Range in Montana, looking north from El Capitan peak

Highest point
- Peak: Trapper Peak
- Elevation: 10,157 ft (3,096 m)
- Coordinates: 44°21′14″N 112°49′17″W

Dimensions
- Length: 304 mi (489 km) N/S
- Width: 268 mi (431 km) E/W
- Area: 14,742 mi^{2} (38,180 km^{2})

Geography
- Location within the United States
- Country: United States
- States: Idaho; Montana
- Parent range: Rocky Mountains

The Bitterroot Range is a mountain range and a subrange of the Rocky Mountains that runs along the border of Montana and Idaho in the northwestern United States. The range spans an area of 24,223 square miles (62,740 km^{2}) and is named after the bitterroot (Lewisia rediviva), a small pink flower that is the state flower of Montana.

== History ==
1805, the Corps of Discovery, led by Meriwether Lewis and William Clark and aided by Sacajawea of the Shoshone tribe, crossed the Bitterroot Range several times. Lewis first crossed the mountains at Lemhi Pass on August 12, then returned across the pass to meet Clark. The entire expedition then crossed the pass to the Salmon River valley, and the next month entered the Bitterroot Valley from the south via either Lost Trail Pass or Chief Joseph Pass. It then crossed Lolo Pass to the west. In June 1806 the Corps of Discovery was then led by 5 members of the Nez Percé back across the Bitterroot Range, from west to east. The Bitterroots also presented a massive problem for the expedition, ending their hope of finding an all water Northwest Passage. The mountains were crossed by the Chicago, Milwaukee, St. Paul and Pacific Railroad (the "Milwaukee Road").

== Ranges ==
According to the U.S. Board on Geographic Names, the Bitterroot Range runs from Pend Oreille Lake (near Sandpoint, Idaho) to Monida Pass. It is sometimes considered to extend east of the Monida Pass to include the Centennial Mountains. The range comprises the following subranges (from north to south):

=== Coeur d'Alène Mountains ===
The Coeur d'Alène Mountains are the northwesternmost portion of the Bitterroot Range and encompass an area of 2,590 square miles (6,700 km^{2}). The mountain range's two highest peaks are the 7,352 foot (2,241 m) Cherry Peak and the 6,837 foot (2,084 m) Patricks Knob.

=== Saint Joe Mountains ===
The Saint Joe Mountains, the smallest named portion of the Bitterroot Range, encompass an area of 698 square miles (1,808 km^{2}). They lie between the St. Joe River on the south, the Coeur d'Alene River on the north, the Slate Creek saddle on the east and the plateau of the Moscow, Idaho/Pullman, Washington area on the Idaho/Washington border.

=== Bitterroot Mountains ===
The Bitterroot Mountains, comprising the Northern and Central Bitterroot Ranges, are the largest portion of the Bitterroot Range and encompass an area of 4,862 square miles (12,593 km^{2}). The mountains are bordered on the north by Lolo Creek, on the south by the Salmon River, on the east by the Bitterroot River and Valley, and on the west by the Selway and Lochsa Rivers. Its highest summit is Trapper Peak, at 10,157 feet (3,096 m).

=== Beaverhead Mountains ===
The Beaverhead Mountains encompass an area of 4,532 square miles (11,738 km^{2}). They lie to the east of the Bitterroot Mountains and lie to the west of the Big Hole Basin and the Pioneer Mountains. Passes in the mountains include Lemhi Pass, Bannock Pass, Big Hole Pass, Big Hole Pass II, Junction Pass and Monida Pass. The Beaverheads are further subdivided into the West Big Hole Mountains, the Big Hole Divide, the Tendoy Mountains, the Italian Peaks, and the Garfield Peaks.

=== Centennial Mountains ===
The Centennial Mountains encompass an area of 2,064 square miles (5,346 km^{2}).

The Centennials are home to Brower's Spring, discovered in 1888 by Jacob V. Brower, which is believed to be the furthest point on the Missouri River. Brower published his finding in 1896 in "The Missouri: Its Utmost Source."

The site of Brower's Spring is at about 8,800 feet (2,680 m) in elevation in the Centennials. The site is now commemorated by a rock cairn at the source of Hellroaring Creek, which flows into the Red Rock River and then into Clark canyon reservoir, where it joins the Beaverhead River and then the Big Hole River, before ultimately joining with the Jefferson River.

== In popular culture ==
- The Bitterroot Range is featured in the 2004 alternate history novel, Dies the Fire, by S.M. Stirling.
