= Jacob V. Brower =

American writer and politician (1844–1905)

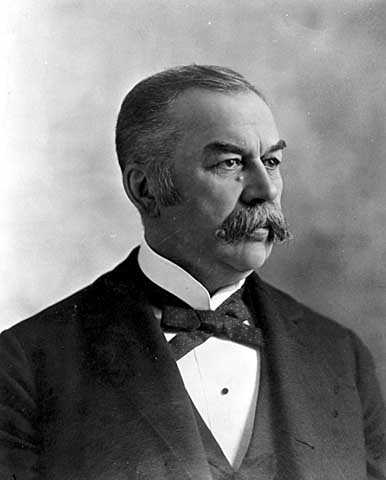
- Brower in 1897
- Born: Jacob Vandenberg Brower; 1844; York, Michigan, United States
- Died: 1905

Jacob Vandenberg Brower (January 11, 1844 – 1905) was a prolific writer of the Upper Midwest region of the United States who championed the location and protection of the utmost headwaters of the Mississippi and Missouri rivers.

== Early life ==
Brower was born in Michigan and later moved to Minnesota. In 1862 he served under the command of Colonel Henry Hastings Sibley during the Dakota Uprising in Minnesota.

After the American Civil War, he served as County Auditor and County Attorney for Todd County, Minnesota. The city of Browerville, Minnesota is named in his honor. In 1872, he was elected to the Minnesota State Legislature, where he represented the 41st District from 1873 to 1874.

== Lake Itasca ==
In 1888, acting as surveyor, Brower visited Lake Itasca to settle a dispute regarding the headwaters of the Mississippi River. The issue was whether Nicollet Creek at the southern tip of Lake Itasca, which flows into the lake, was the official start of the Mississippi. Brower followed the creek through swamps and ponds to Lake Hernando de Soto. He spent five months on Lake Itasca and eventually concluded that since the Nicollet Creek was an intermittent stream, it should not qualify as the source of the Mississippi.

Brower led the campaign to stop logging around Lake Itasca by the companies owned by timber industrialist Friedrich Weyerhäuser. On April 20, 1891, the state legislature by a margin of one approved the plans for a state park.

The official visitor center for the park is now called the Jacob V. Brower Visitor Center and Brower is often referred to as the "Father of Lake Itasca".

== Brower's Spring ==
In the late 1800s Brower questioned the conventional wisdom that Meriwether Lewis had discovered the true source of the Missouri River on August 12, 1805, above Lemhi Pass on the Continental Divide at the source of Trail Creek.

Studying maps, he said the source should be 100 miles further away, at the source of Hell Roaring Creek at about 8,800 feet on Mount Jefferson in the Centennial Mountains on the Montana side of the Continental Divide.

In 1888 he visited the site of Brower's Spring, which he determined as the true source of the Missouri, and buried a metal tablet with his name and the date nearby. In 1896 he published his findings in "The Missouri: Its Utmost Source."

Both sources ultimately drain into the Jefferson River which combines with the Madison and the Gallatin Rivers to form the Missouri at Missouri Headwaters State Park.

== Death and legacy ==
Brower died in 1905. He lies buried at North Star Cemetery in Saint Cloud, Minnesota. His monument recognizes him as the founder of Itasca State Park and the Minnesota State Park system.
