= Red Rock Pass (Montana) =

- Location within the United States Location within Idaho
- Elevation: 7,152 feet (2,180 m)

Third Approach
- Location: Beaverhead County, Montana / Fremont County, Idaho, U.S.
- Range: Centennial Mountains
- Coordinates: 44°35′56″N 111°31′25″W

Red Rock Pass is a mountain pass in the northern Rocky Mountains of the western United States. On the Continental Divide at an elevation of 7,152 feet (2,180 m) above sea level, it is just north of the eastern Centennial Mountains on the Montana–Idaho state line.

The pass separates Beaverhead County, Montana, (west) from Fremont County, Idaho (east), and is traversed by an unimproved gravel road.

During the Nez Perce War of 1877, a band of Nez Perce crossed the pass on August 20, shortly after the Battle of Camas Creek, en route to Yellowstone National Park.

== See also ==
- List of mountain passes in Montana
