= Mount Jefferson (Bitterroot Range) =

Mountain in Idaho and Montana, United States

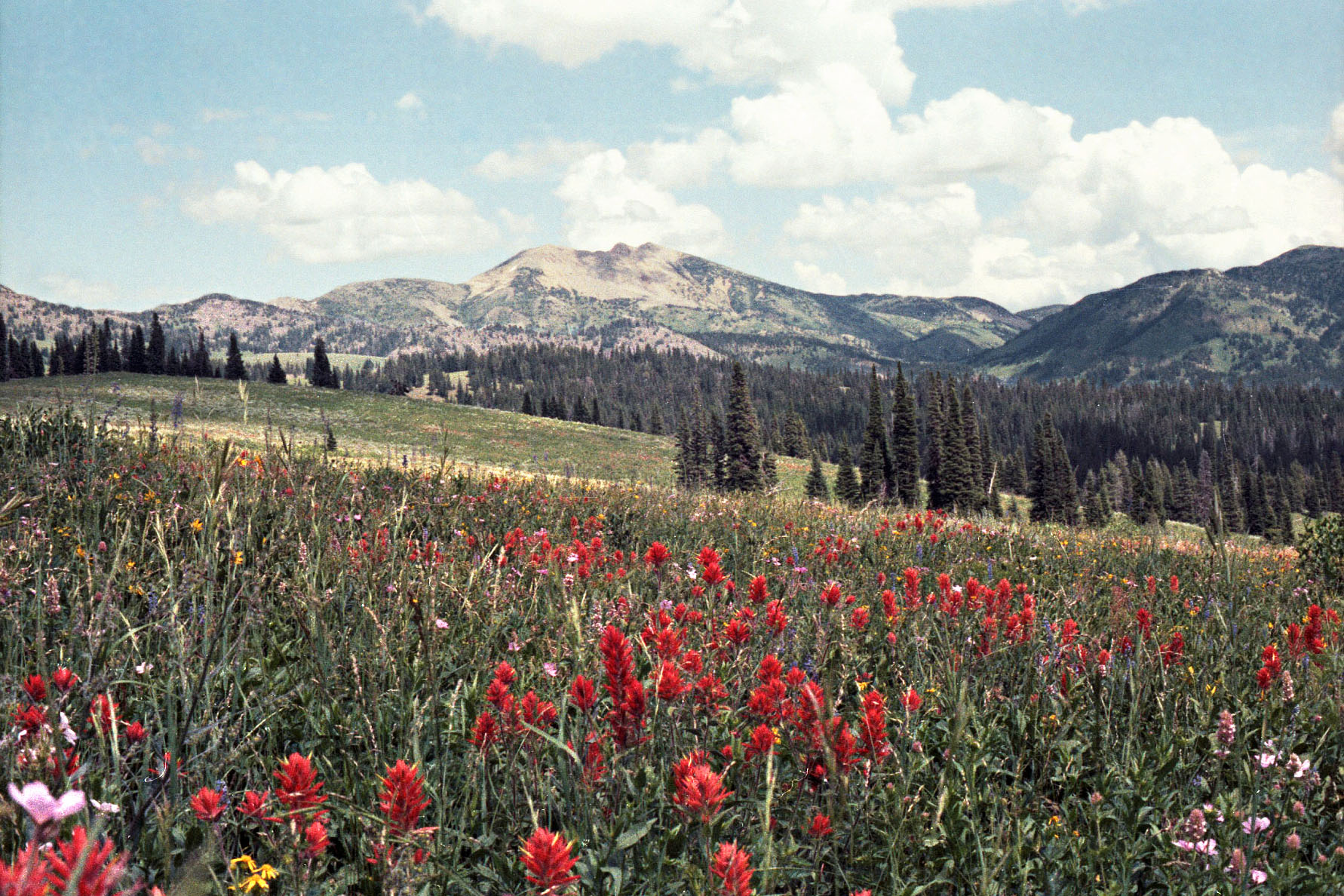
- Mount Jefferson and Flowers (Indian Paintbrush)

Highest point
- Elevation: 10,216 ft (3,114 m) NAVD 88
- Prominence: 3,363 ft (1,025 m)
- Coordinates: 44°33′43″N 111°30′18″W

Geography
- Location within Montana
- Location: Fremont County, Idaho and Beaverhead County, Montana. U.S.
- Parent range: Centennial Mountains, Bitterroot Range
- Topo map: USGS Mount Jefferson

Climbing
- Easiest route: scramble from Sawtell Peak

Mount Jefferson is a mountain located on the Continental Divide between Fremont County of northeastern Idaho and Beaverhead County of southwestern Montana. Mount Jefferson is the highest point of the Centennial Mountains, whose crest runs along the Continental Divide and can be climbed using a class 2 route (scramble) from the access road to neighboring Sawtell Peak.

The south and west slopes of Mount Jefferson drain into Hell Roaring Creek, thence into Red Rock Creek, the Red Rock River, the Beaverhead River, the Jefferson River, the Missouri River, the Mississippi River, and into the Gulf of Mexico. Brower's Spring, the source of Hell Roaring Creek, on the mountain's east flank in Montana, is considered the absolute headwaters of the Missouri River. The northeast slope of Mount Jefferson drains into the South Fork of Duck Creek, thence into Henrys Lake, the Henrys Fork of the Snake River, the Columbia River, and into the Pacific Ocean.

The mountain is named for United States Founding Father and third president, Thomas Jefferson.
