= Hell Roaring Creek =

Creek in south Montana, part of the Missouri

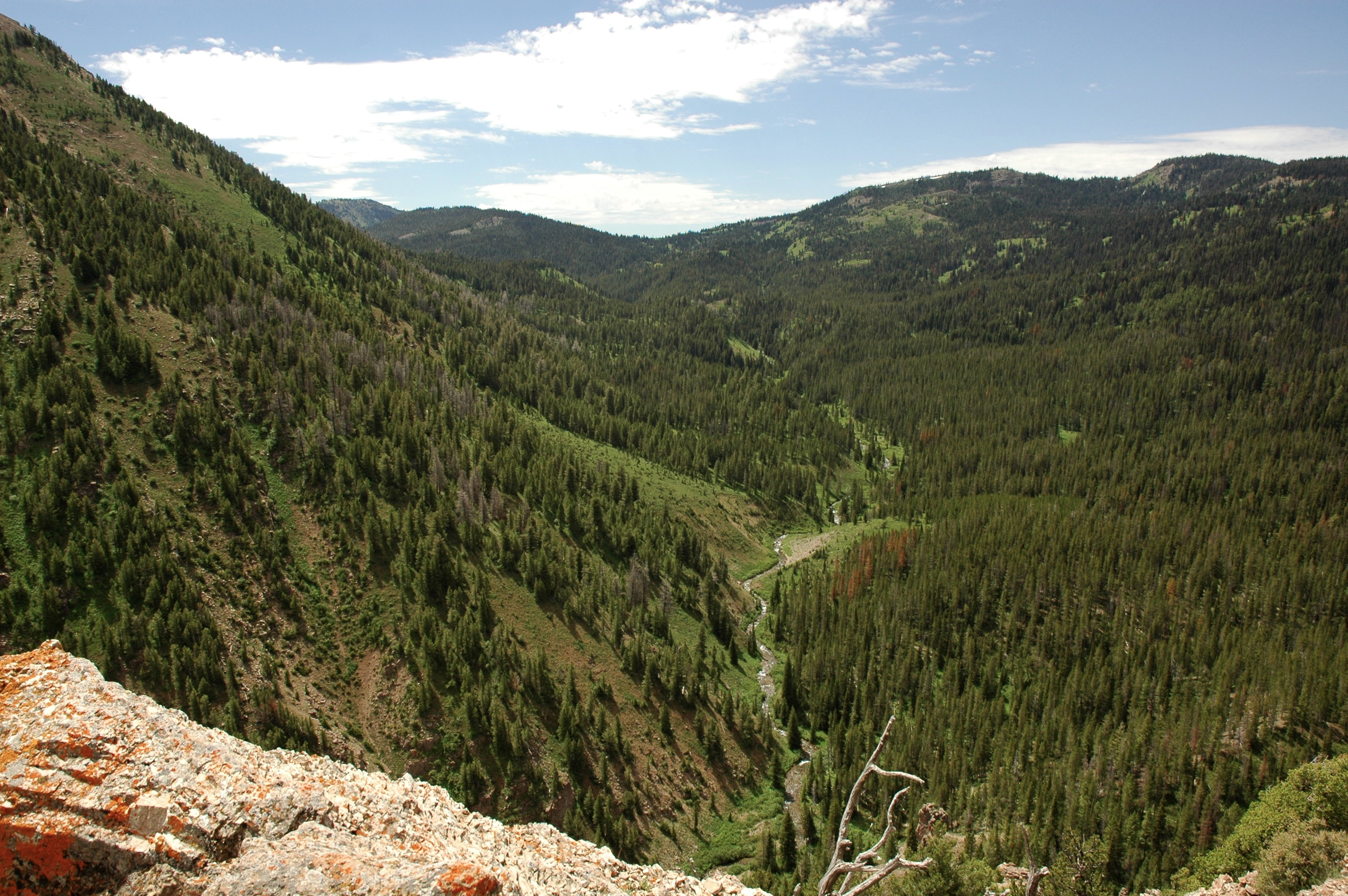
- Hell Roaring Creek flowing through Hell Roaring Canyon in southern Montana

Location
- County: Beaverhead County, Montana

Physical characteristics
- Source
  - location: Brower's Spring
- Mouth: Red Rock River
  - coordinates: 44°37′01″N 111°33′08″W

Basin features
- River system: Missouri River

Hell Roaring Creek is a fast-running creek in southern Montana. The creek flows from Brower's Spring, which is considered the ultimate source of the Missouri River. Hell Roaring Creek is the most distant point in the Mississippi River system and, combined with its downstream rivers, marks the starting point of the fourth longest river in the world.
