= River source =

Starting point of a river

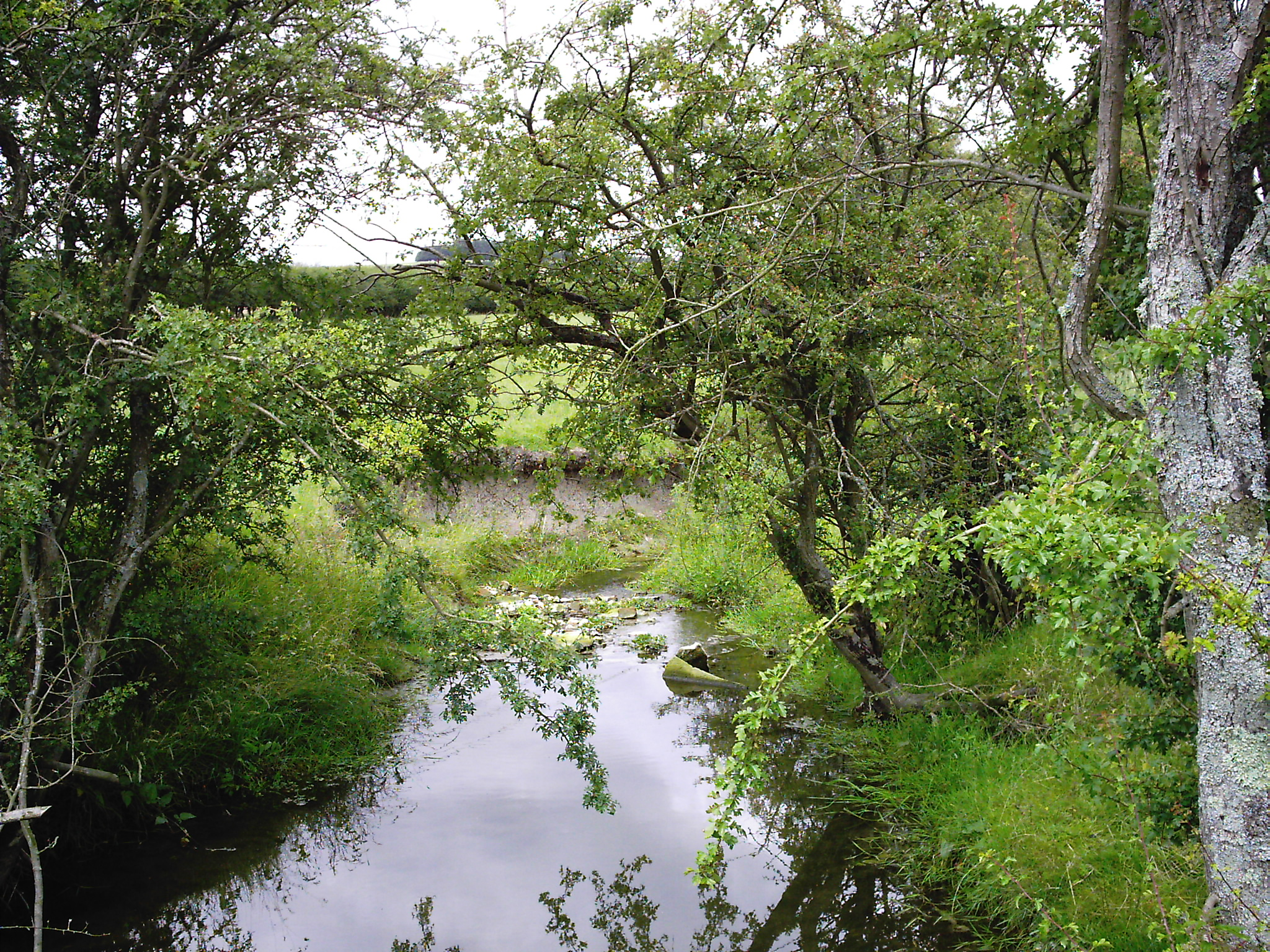
River Wey near its source at Farringdon, England

The source or headwater of a river or stream is the geographical point of its beginning, specifically where surface runoff water begins to accumulate into a flowing channel of water. A river or stream into which one or many tributary rivers or streams flow has many headwaters, these being all of the individual headwaters of its tributaries. Each headwater is one of the river or stream's sources, as it is the place where surface runoffs from rainwater, meltwater, or spring water begin accumulating into a more substantial and consistent flow that becomes a first-order tributary of that river or stream. The tributary with the longest channel of all the tributaries to a river or stream, such length measured from that tributary's headwater to its mouth where it discharges into the river or stream, is the main stem of the river or stream in question.

== Definition ==
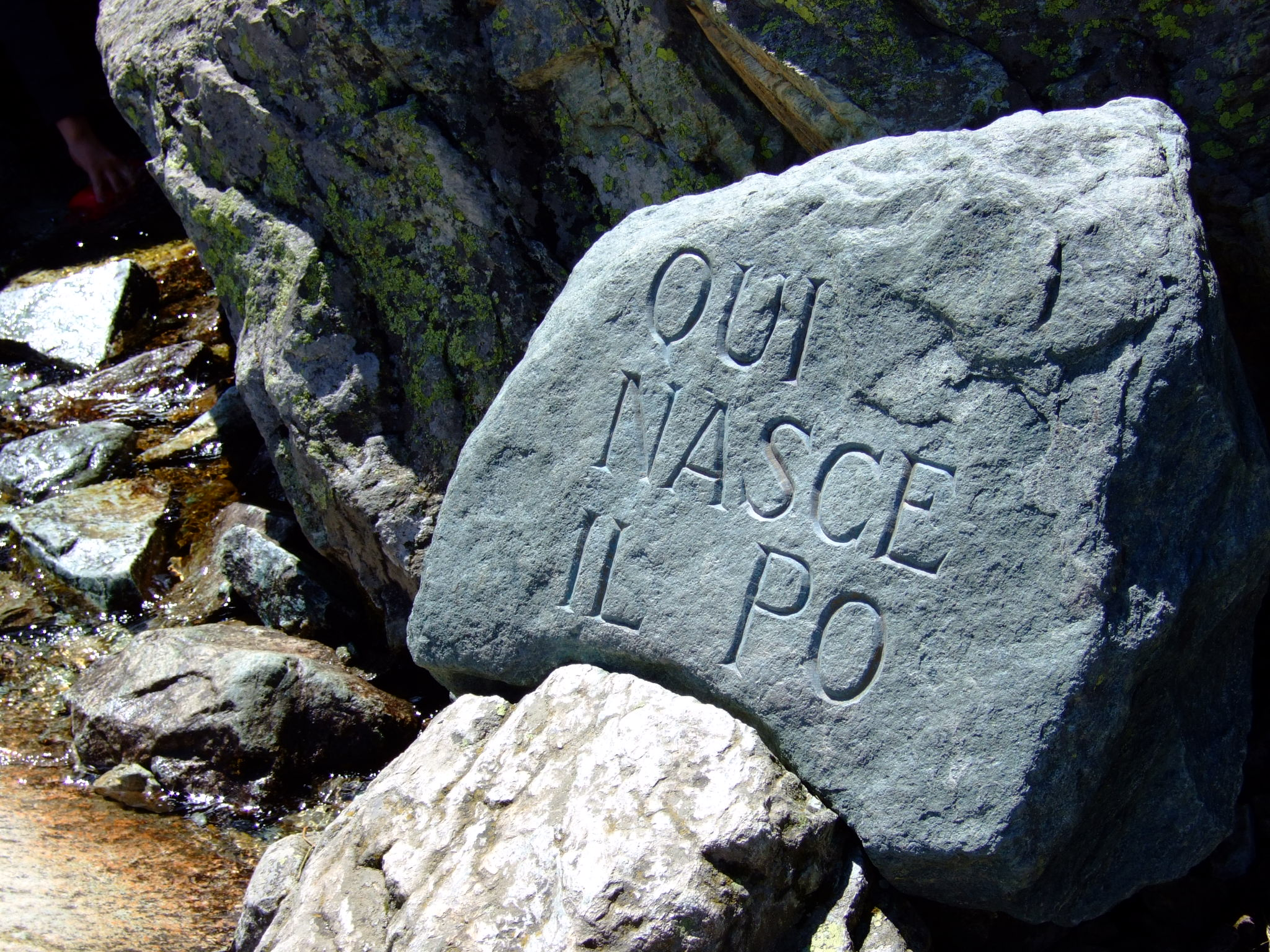
A stone near Crissolo, Italy, is inscribed, "Here is born the Po".

The United States Geological Survey (USGS) states that a river's "length may be considered to be the distance from the mouth to the most distant headwater source (irrespective of stream name), or from the mouth to the headwaters of the stream commonly known as the source stream". As an example of the second definition above, the USGS at times considers the Missouri River as a tributary of the Mississippi River. But it also follows the first definition above (along with virtually all other geographic authorities and publications) in using the combined Missouri–lower Mississippi length figure in lists of lengths of rivers around the world. Most rivers have numerous tributaries and change names often; it is customary to regard the longest tributary or stem as the source, regardless of what name that watercourse may carry on local maps and in local usage.

This most commonly identified definition of a river source specifically uses the most distant point (along watercourses from the river mouth) in the drainage basin from which water runs year-around (perennially), or, alternatively, as the furthest point from which water could possibly flow ephemerally. The latter definition includes sometimes-dry channels and removes any possible definitions that would have the river source "move around" from month to month depending on precipitation or ground water levels. This definition, from geographer Andrew Johnston of the Smithsonian Institution, is also used by the National Geographic Society when pinpointing the source of rivers such as the Amazon or Nile. A definition given by the state of Montana agrees, stating that a river source is never a confluence but is "in a location that is the farthest, along water miles, from where that river ends."

Under this definition, neither a lake (excepting lakes with no inflows) nor a confluence of tributaries can be a true river source, though both often provide the starting point for the portion of a river carrying a single name. For example, National Geographic and virtually every other geographic authority and atlas define the source of the Nile River not as Lake Victoria's outlet where the name "Nile" first appears, which would reduce the Nile's length by over 900 km (560 mi) (dropping it to fourth or fifth on the list of world's rivers), but instead use the source of the largest river flowing into the lake, the Kagera River. Likewise, the source of the Amazon River has been determined this way, even though the river changes names numerous times along its course. However, the source of the Thames in England is traditionally reckoned according to the named river Thames rather than its longer tributary, the Churn — although not without contention.

When not listing river lengths, however, alternative definitions may be used. The Missouri River's source is named by some USGS and other federal and state agency sources, following Lewis and Clark's naming convention, as the confluence of the Madison and Jefferson rivers, rather than the source of its longest tributary (the Jefferson). This contradicts the most common definition, which is, according to a US Army Corps of Engineers official on a USGS site, that "[geographers] generally follow the longest tributary to identify the source of rivers and streams." In the case of the Missouri River, this would have the source be well upstream from Lewis and Clark's confluence, "following the Jefferson River to the Beaverhead River to Red Rock River, then Red Rock Creek to Hell Roaring Creek."

== Characteristics ==
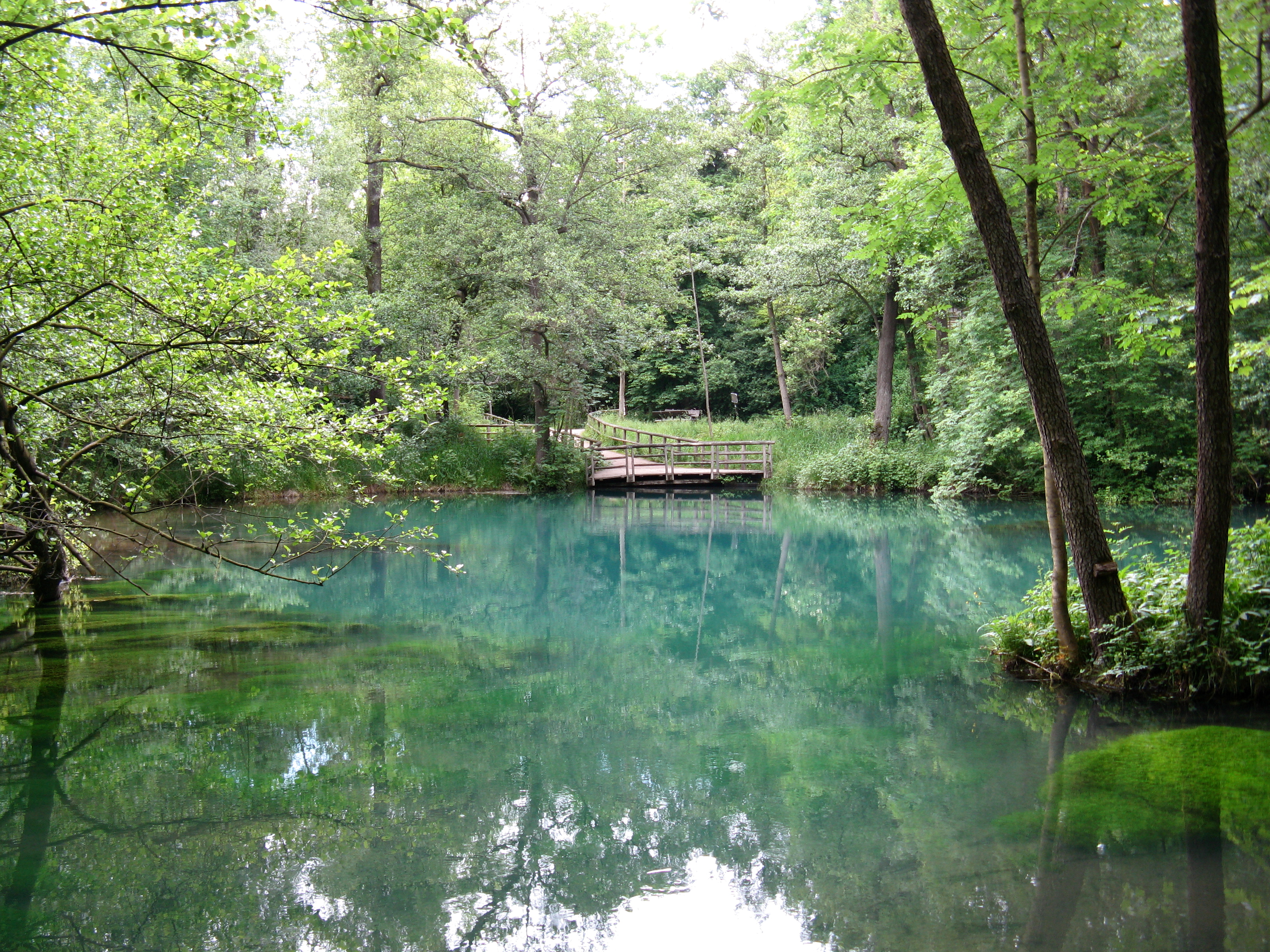
Rhume Spring is the source of the Rhume river.

Sometimes the source of the most remote tributary may be in an area that is more marsh-like, in which the "uppermost" or most remote section of the marsh would be the true source. For example, the source of the River Tees is marshland.

The furthest stream is also often called the head stream. Headwaters are often small streams with cool waters because of shade and recently melted ice or snow. They may also be glacial headwaters, waters formed by the melting of glacial ice.

Headwater areas are the upstream areas of a watershed, as opposed to the outflow or discharge of a watershed. The river source is often but not always on or quite near the edge of the watershed, or watershed divide. For example, the source of the Colorado River is at the Continental Divide separating the Atlantic Ocean and Pacific Ocean watersheds of North America.

=== Example ===
A river is considered a linear geographic feature, with only one mouth and one source. For an example, the Mississippi River and Missouri River sources are officially defined as follows:

- "Largest Rivers in the United States". United States Geological Survey.
- U.S. Geological Survey Geographic Names Information System: Mississippi River, Length: 2,340 miles (3,770 km), Source: 47°14′22″N 95°12′29″W
- U.S. Geological Survey Geographic Names Information System: Missouri River, Length: 2,540 miles (4,090 km), Source: 45°55′39″N 111°30′29″W

== Related usages ==
The verb "rise" can be used to express the general region of a river's source, and is often qualified with an adverbial expression of place. For example:

- The River Thames rises in Gloucestershire.
- The White Nile rises in the Great Lakes region of central Africa.

The word "source", when applied to lakes rather than rivers or streams, refers to the lake's inflow.

== See also ==
- Source of the Amazon River
- Source of the Nile
- Spring (hydrology)
- Strahler number
- Water well
