= Brower's Spring =

Spring in Beaverhead County, Montana, United States

Coordinates: 44°33′02″N 111°28′20″W

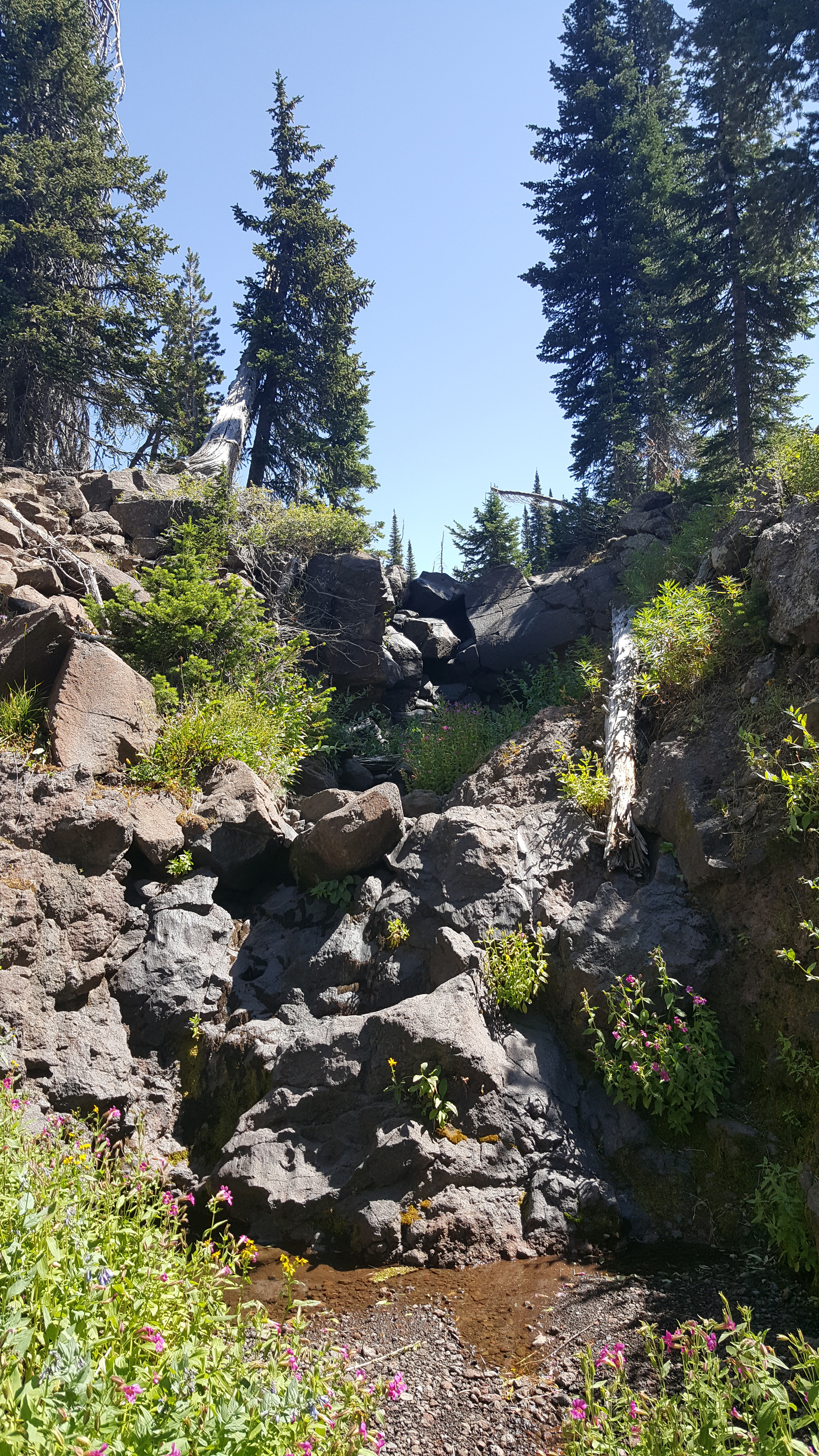
A probable location for Brower's Spring in Montana

Brower's Spring is a spring in the Centennial Mountains of Beaverhead County, Montana, that was identified by surveyor Jacob V. Brower in 1888 as the ultimate headwaters of the Missouri River and thus of the fourth-longest river system in the world, the 3,902-mile-long (6,280 km) Mississippi–Missouri River.

In 1896, Brower declared the spring to be the source of the Missouri in his book published by the Pioneer Press titled The Missouri River and Its Utmost Source. He had visited the site in 1895 and buried a copper plate nearby upon which the name of the river and the date were engraved.

The spring is 100 miles (160 km) further than the spot Meriwether Lewis reported in 1805 as the source of the Missouri above Lemhi Pass on Trail Creek. Both sources are near the Continental Divide in southwestern Montana. Brower's Spring is 298.3 miles (480.1 km) upstream from where the name "Missouri River" is first used.

Though the copper plate has not been located, the site of Brower's Spring is believed to be at about 8,800 feet (2,700 m) on the north fork of where Hell Roaring Creek divides near its source. It is commemorated by a rock pile. Hell Roaring Creek flows west into the Red Rock River, which flows through Upper, then Lower Red Rock Lakes, west through Lima Reservoir, and then northwest into Clark Canyon Reservoir. From Clark Canyon Reservoir the Beaverhead River flows northeast to join the Big Hole River, forming the Jefferson River, which with the Madison and Gallatin Rivers form the Missouri at Missouri River Headwaters State Park at Three Forks, Montana.

Brower's location is just below a ridge extending to the southeast from Mount Jefferson 2 miles (3 km) to the northwest, and is 1.6 miles (2.6 km) southwest of the Sawtell Peak Observatory in Idaho, about 20 miles (32 km) southwest of West Yellowstone, Montana, and about 1,600 feet (500 m) southwest of the nearest point on the North American Continental Divide.

Brower's Spring is not listed as an official name in the Geographic Names Information System maintained by USGS.
