= Red Rock River (Montana) =

River in Montana, United States

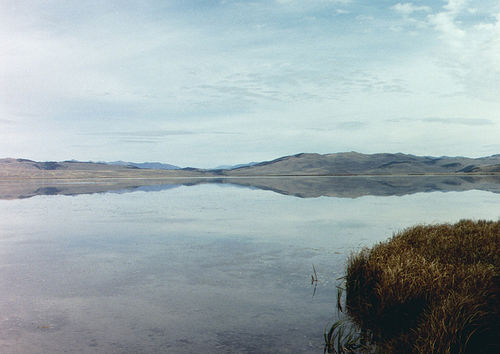
- Upper Red Rock Lake near headwaters of Red Rock River

- Location of mouth

Location
- Country: United States
- State: Montana
- County: Beaverhead

Physical characteristics
- Mouth
  - coordinates: 44°56′33″N 112°50′43″W
  - elevation: 5,545 feet (1,690 m)
- Length: 70 miles (110 km)
- Basin size: 1,548 square miles (4,010 km^{2})
- Discharge
  - location: Red Rock
  - average: 238 cu ft/s (6.7 m^{3}/s)

Basin features
- River system: Missouri River

The Red Rock River is a roughly 70-mile (110 km) river in southwestern Montana in the United States. Its drainage basin covers over 1,548 square miles (4,010 km^{2}). Its furthest tributary, Hell Roaring Creek, originates in the Beaverhead National Forest within a few hundred meters of the North American Continental Divide and Montana-Idaho border near Brower's Spring, at an elevation of about 9,100 feet (2,800 m). Brower's Spring is near the furthest headwaters of the Missouri River, one of the major watercourses of the central United States. As such, it is also the furthest headwaters of the entire Missouri-Mississippi river system, today the fourth longest river (after the Nile, Amazon, and Yangtze) on earth and once the third-longest.

The drainage flows north and west with its name changing to "Red Rock Creek" into the Red Rock Lakes in the middle of a wide grassy valley; the Red Rock River issues from the west side of Lower Red Rock Lake. It flows west, receiving many tributaries such as Peet Creek and Long Creek, widening into the Lima Reservoir and then passing through a canyon, which ends near Lima, Montana. From there, it flows northwest through a valley, passing Kidd and Red Rock, and into Clark Canyon Reservoir. Under the waters of the lake was once the confluence of the Red Rock and Horse Prairie Creek, forming the Beaverhead River, a tributary of the Jefferson River, in turn a headwater of the Missouri River.

== See also ==
- List of rivers of Montana
- Montana Stream Access Law
