= Centennial Mountains =

Mountain range in Idaho and Montana, United States

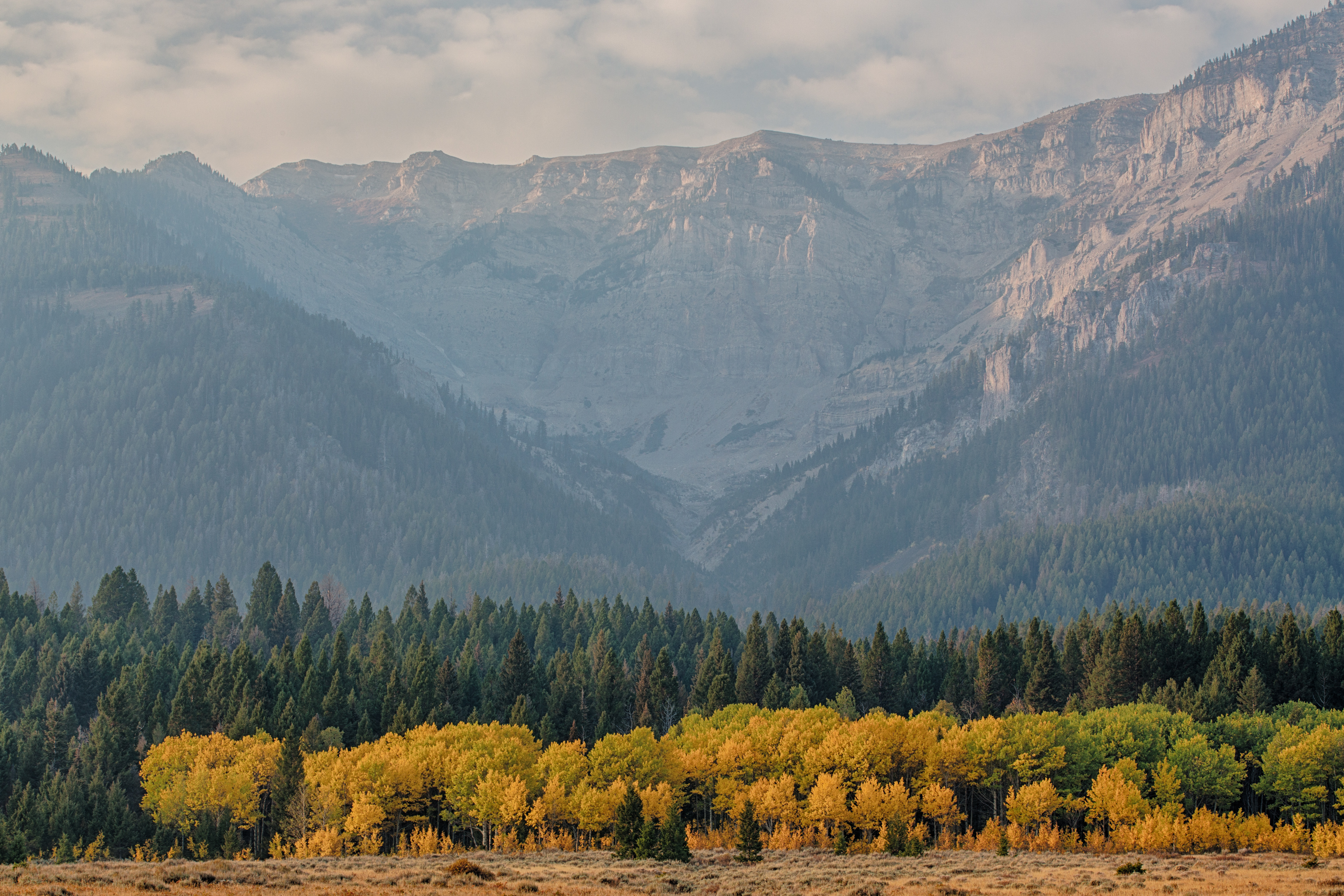

Highest point
- Peak: Mount Jefferson (Bitterroot Range)
- Elevation: 10,216 ft (3,114 m)
- Coordinates: 45°36′10″N 112°0′25″W

Geography
- Location within the United States
- Country: United States
- States: Montana and Idaho
- Parent range: Bitterroot

The Centennial Mountains are the southernmost sub-range of the Bitterroot Range in the U.S. states of Idaho and Montana. The Centennial Mountains include the Western and Eastern Centennial Mountains. The range extends east from Monida Pass along the Continental Divide to Henrys Fork 48 km (30 mi) NNW of Ashton, Idaho; bounded on the west by Beaver Creek, on the north by Centennial Valley and Henrys Lake Mountains, on the east by Henrys Lake Flat, and on the south by Shotgun Valley and the Snake River Plain. The highest peak in the range is Mount Jefferson.

They are one of only a few ranges within the Rocky Mountains that trend west to east, and the Continental Divide runs along their ridge line.

The Western Centennial Mountains extends west from the Eastern Centennial Mountains along the Continental Divide to Monida Pass, 25 mi NE of Dubois, Idaho; Snake River Plain, on the north by Centennial Valley, and the east by a line connecting Odell Creek and an unnamed tributary, in Montana, to Ching Creek in Idaho.

About 100,000 acres of the Centennials are roadless. This includes National Forest lands, the Bureau of Land Management's Centennial Mountains Primitive Area, a portion of Red Rock Lakes National Wildlife Refuge, state and private land, and part of a USDA Agricultural Research Station for sheep. Around 326 vascular plant species have been identified in the Centennials, an unusual plant diversity for the Yellowstone region. Grizzly bears inhabit the area, as nearly all species indigenous to the Greater Yellowstone Ecosystem are present. The north slope of the Centennials rises abruptly 3,000 feet above the Centennial Valley.

== Peaks ==
Highest peaks of the Centennial Mountains

- Mount Jefferson 10,216 ft
- Baldy Mountain 9,892 ft
- Sawtell Peak 9,884 ft
- Baldy Mountain West 9,880+
- Taylor Mountain 9,863 ft
- Slide Mountain 9,800+ ft
- Sheep Mountain 9,688 ft

== See also ==
- List of mountain ranges in Montana

== Notes ==
Media related to Centennial Mountains at Wikimedia Commons
