= List of national forests of the United States =

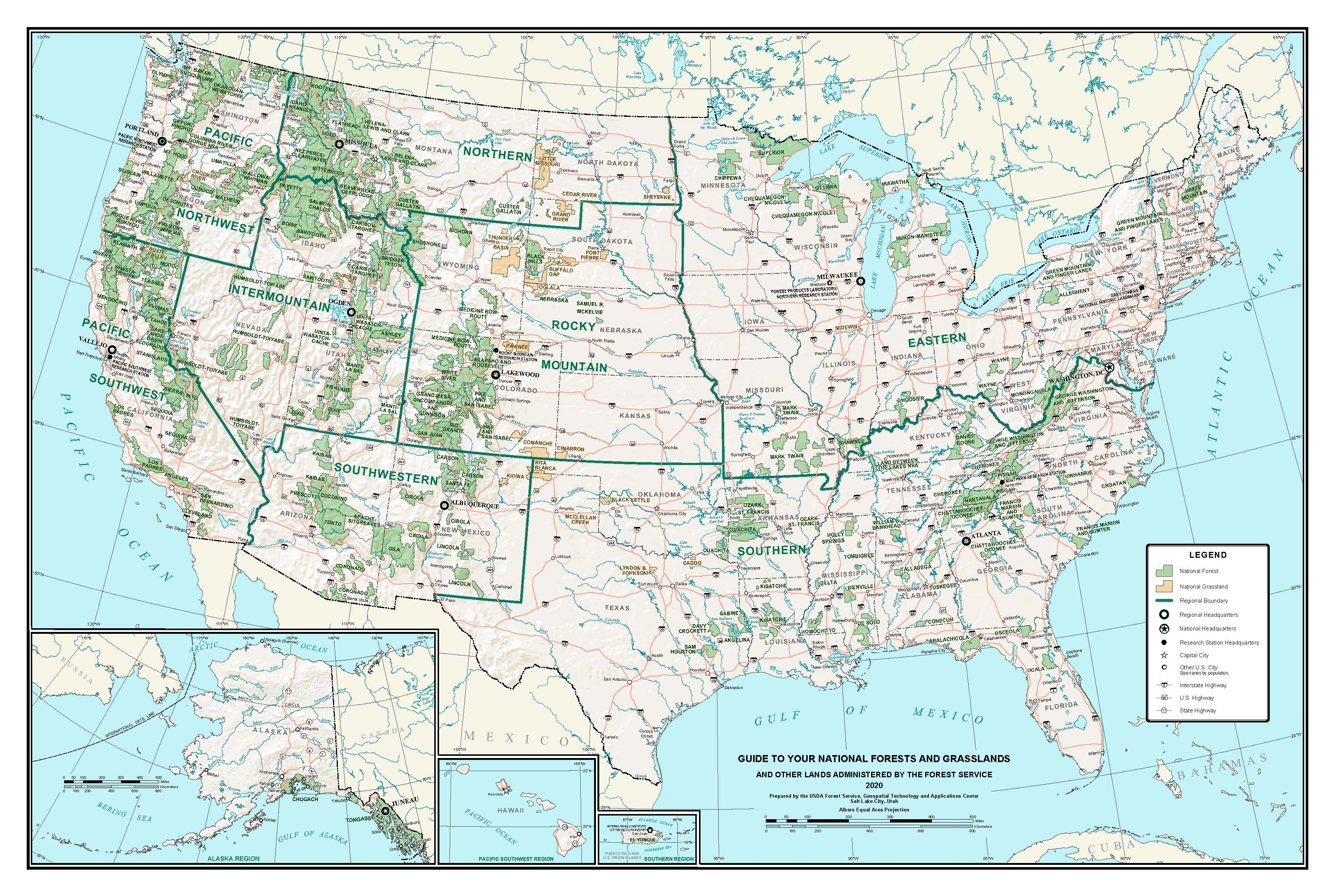
Map of national forests and national grasslands of the United States

The United States has 154 protected areas known as national forests, covering 188,336,179 acres (762,169 km^{2}; 294,275 sq mi). National forests are managed by the U.S. Forest Service, an agency of the U.S. Department of Agriculture. The first national forest was established as the Yellowstone Park Timber and Land Reserve on March 30, 1891, then in the Department of the Interior. In 1897, the Organic Act provided purposes for which forest reserves could be established, including to reserve a supply of timber, protect the forest from development, and secure water supplies. With the Forest Reserve Act of 1891, the president of the United States is given the power to set aside forest reserves in the public domain. With the Transfer Act of 1905, forest reserves became part of the U.S. Department of Agriculture in the newly created U.S. Forest Service.

By 1907, President Theodore Roosevelt had more than doubled the forest-reserve acreage, and Congress responded by limiting the president's ability to proclaim new reserves. The National Forest System underwent a major reorganization in 1908, and in 1911 Congress authorized new additions to the system under the authority of the Weeks Act. The management goals provided by the Organic Act were expanded upon by the Multiple-Use Sustained-Yield Act of 1960 to include "outdoor recreation, range, timber, watershed, and wildlife and fish purposes" as well as for the establishment of wilderness areas.

As of September 30, 2014, the Forest Service manages a total of 192,922,127 acres (780,728.15 km^{2}), 188,336,179 acres (762,169.48 km^{2}) of which are national forests. The additional land areas include 20 national grasslands, 59 purchase units, 19 research and experimental areas, five land utilization projects and 37 other areas. The National Forest System has an extensive and complicated history of reorganization, so while there are currently 154 named national forests, many of these are managed together as either a single forest or separate forests.^{[A]}

There is at least one national forest in all but ten states: Connecticut, Delaware, Hawaii, Iowa, Kansas, Maryland, Massachusetts, New Jersey, North Dakota, and Rhode Island (although Kansas and North Dakota have national grasslands). In addition, Puerto Rico contains El Yunque National Forest, the only tropical U.S. rainforest. Alaska has the most national forest land, with 21.9 million acres (8.9 million ha), followed by California (20.8 million acres, 8.4 million ha) and Idaho (20.4 million acres, 8.3 million ha). Idaho also has the greatest percent of its land in national forests, with 38.2 percent, followed by Oregon (24.7 percent) and Colorado (20.9 percent). On maps, national forests in the west generally show the true extent of their area, but those in the east often only show purchase districts, within which usually only a minority of the land is owned by the Forest Service.

== National forests ==
Name^{A}	Photo	Location^{B}	HQ	Date formed^{C}	Area	Description^{D}
Allegheny	A photo of Allegheny Reservoir in fall	Pennsylvania; 41°39′N 79°01′W	Warren, PA	September 24, 1923	513,655 acres (2,078.7 km^{2})	Pennsylvania's only national forest includes Kinzua Dam and Allegheny Reservoir on the Allegheny Plateau in the northwestern part of the state. The forest contains the largest tract of remaining old-growth forest in Pennsylvania at Tionesta Scenic and Research Natural Areas and 10 mi (16 km) of the North Country Trail.
Angeles	A photo of the San Gabriel Mountains	California; 34°24′N 118°10′W	Arcadia, CA	December 20, 1892	661,565 acres (2,677.3 km^{2})	Located in the San Gabriel Mountains at the edge of the Los Angeles metro area, this national forest includes five wilderness areas. Much of the forest is dense chaparral. Elevations in the forest range from 1,200 feet (370 m) to 10,064 feet (3,068 m) at the summit of Mount San Antonio.
Angelina	A photo of a ranger station in Angelina National Forest.	Texas; 31°13′N 94°17′W	Lufkin, TX	October 13, 1936	154,140 acres (623.8 km^{2})	Primarily longleaf, loblolly, and shortleaf pine, the forest includes two wilderness areas and borders the Sam Rayburn Reservoir. The forest provides habitat for the endangered red-cockaded woodpecker and wintering habitat for bald eagles.
Apache–Sitgreaves Apache, Sitgreaves	A photo of the highlands from route 191 in Arizona in Apache–Sitgreaves National Forest	Arizona, New Mexico; 33°44′N 109°05′W	Springerville, AZ	August 17, 1898	2,626,306 acres (10,628.3 km^{2})	Encompassing the Mogollon Rim and White Mountains, this forest includes 34 lakes and over 680 miles (1,090 km) of rivers and streams, more than any other national forest in the arid Southwest.
Apalachicola	A photo of an artificial pond off of FH-111 in Apalachicola National Forest.	Florida; 30°11′N 84°41′W	Tallahassee, FL	May 13, 1936	576,119 acres (2,331.5 km^{2})	As the largest national forest in Florida, Apalachicola includes over 2,700 acres (1,100 ha) of water and 67 mi (108 km) of the Florida Trail. There are caverns and sinkholes at the Leon Sinks Geological Area, while Fort Gadsden is along the Apalachicola River.
Arapaho	A photo of aspens in fall along the Crooked Creek Road	Colorado; 39°41′N 105°56′W	Fort Collins, CO	October 24, 1903	720,418 acres (2,915.4 km^{2})	Arapaho National Forest is in the high Rockies and includes six wilderness areas. It is currently managed jointly with Roosevelt National Forest and Pawnee National Grassland. The highest paved road in North America ascends Mount Blue Sky at an elevation of 14,265 ft (4,348 m).
Ashley	A photo of King's Peak and Henry's Fork Basin.	Utah, Wyoming; 40°38′N 110°06′W	Vernal, UT	July 1, 1908	1,378,424 acres (5,578.3 km^{2})	Ashley National Forest manages the Flaming Gorge National Recreation Area and the High Uintas Wilderness. Kings Peak at 13,528 ft (4,123 m) is the highest point in Utah and is located in the Uinta Mountains.
Beaverhead–Deerlodge Beaverhead, Deerlodge	A photo of a stream and mountains in Beaverhead–Deerlodge National Forest.	Montana; 45°30′N 113°00′W	Dillon, MT	July 1, 1908	3,362,638 acres (13,608.1 km^{2})	The largest national forest in Montana, it encompasses several mountain ranges of the Rocky Mountains. The forest includes the Anaconda–Pintler and Lee Metcalf wilderness areas and sections of the Continental Divide Trail and Nez Perce National Historic Trail.
Bienville	A photo of a forest sign in Bienville National Forest	Mississippi; 32°16′N 89°30′W	Jackson, MS	June 15, 1936	180,251 acres (729.4 km^{2})	Located in central Mississippi, this forest includes several lakes and reservoirs and Harrell Prairie, the largest and least disturbed prairie in the state. Bienville Pines Scenic Area includes 223 acres (90 ha) of old-growth forest. It is managed collectively with Mississippi's five other national forests.
Bighorn	A mountain meadow in Bighorn National Forest.	Wyoming; 44°32′N 107°21′W	Sheridan, WY	February 22, 1897	1,105,311 acres (4,473.0 km^{2})	In the Bighorn Mountains of north-central Wyoming, Bighorn National Forest has eight lodges, several reservoirs, and 1,500 mi (2,400 km) of trails. Elevation reach 13,167 ft (4,013 m) at Cloud Peak in the Cloud Peak Wilderness, which is also the location of the Cloud Peak Glacier.
Bitterroot	A photo of Lake Como and mountains	Montana, Idaho; 45°46′N 114°17′W	Hamilton, MT	February 22, 1897	1,594,579 acres (6,453.0 km^{2})	Bitterroot National Forest is located in the Bitterroot and Sapphire mountains, reaching its highest point at 10,157 ft (3,096 m) at Trapper Peak. The forest is named for the bitterroot plant.
Black Hills	A photo of the Black Hills in the Black Elk Wilderness with Horsethief Lake.	South Dakota, Wyoming; 44°00′N 103°47′W	Custer, SD	February 22, 1897	1,250,866 acres (5,062.1 km^{2})	Consisting predominantly of Ponderosa pine, this forest is located in the namesake Black Hills. There are 11 reservoirs, 353 mi (568 km) of trails, and 1,300 mi (2,100 km) of streams in this forest. Black Elk Peak is the highest point in South Dakota and the highest point in the United States east of the Rocky Mountains at 7,244 ft (2,208 m).
Boise	A photo of rocks along a river in Boise National Forest.	Idaho; 44°07′N 115°34′W	Boise, ID	July 1, 1908	2,648,273 acres (10,717.2 km^{2})	Portions of the Boise, Payette, and South and Middle Forks of the Salmon River drainages make up the forest. There are over 7,600 mi (12,200 km) of streams and more than 250 lakes and reservoirs in the forest.
Bridger–Teton Bridger, Teton	Wind River Range approaching the Lozier Lakes	Wyoming; 42°45′N 110°45′W	Jackson, WY	February 22, 1897	3,383,302 acres (13,691.7 km^{2})	As part of the Greater Yellowstone Ecosystem, Bridger–Teton National Forest has 27 glaciers in its portion of the Wind River Range. The Gros Ventre landslide formed a dam on the Gros Ventre River in 1925 before failing in 1927.
Caribou–Targhee Caribou, Targhee	Upper Mesa Falls	Idaho, Wyoming, Utah; 41°57′N 112°08′W	Idaho Falls, ID	May 23, 1905	2,624,739 acres (10,621.9 km^{2})	The forest's Jedediah Smith Wilderness has many caves and the Winegar Hole Wilderness protects grizzly bear habitat in the Greater Yellowstone Ecosystem. The Upper and Lower Mesa Falls are on Henrys Fork of the Snake River and tours of Minnetonka Cave are available.
Carson	A photo of Wheeler Peak from Mount Walter	New Mexico; 36°30′N 106°04′W	Taos, NM	November 7, 1906	1,486,372 acres (6,015.1 km^{2})	In the Sangre de Cristo Mountains, this forest has over 600 mi (970 km) of trails and Taos Ski Valley. The highest point in the forest is Wheeler Peak, also New Mexico's highest point, at 13,161 ft (4,011 m).
Chattahoochee–Oconee Chattahoochee, Oconee	A photo of a waterfall along the Raven Cliffs Trail	Georgia; 34°45′N 84°07′W	Gainesville, GA	July 9, 1936	866,763 acres (3,507.7 km^{2})	With 430 mi (690 km) of trails, this forest contains the southern terminius of the Appalachian Trail. Georgia's highest point, Brasstown Bald at 4,784 ft (1,458 m) is in the forest, and several Civil War battles were fought in the area.
Chequamegon–Nicolet Chequamegon, Nicolet	A photo of a lake and coniferous forests.	Wisconsin; 46°02′N 90°48′W	Rhinelander, WI	March 2, 1933	1,523,704 acres (6,166.2 km^{2})	There are 2,020 lakes, 440 spring ponds, and 347,000 acres (140,000 ha) of wetlands in this national forest. There are also 493 mi (793 km) of non-motorized trails, 292 mi (470 km) of motorized trails, and 9,000 mi (14,000 km) of roads alongside five wilderness areas.
Cherokee	South Fork of Citico Creek in the Citico Creek Wilderness.	Tennessee, North Carolina; 35°52′N 83°03′W	Cleveland, TN	June 14, 1920	656,394 acres (2,656.3 km^{2})	Cherokee National Forest has eleven wilderness areas, three large lakes, and over 600 mi (970 km) of trails, including 150 mi (240 km) of the Appalachian Trail in the Great Smoky Mountains. There are 43 mammal species, 154 fish species, 55 amphibian species, and 262 bird species in the forest.
Chippewa	A trail	Minnesota; 47°24′N 94°08′W	Cass Lake, MN	May 23, 1908	671,952 acres (2,719.3 km^{2})	With 1,300 lakes and ponds, 925 mi (1,489 km) of rivers, and 440,000 acres (180,000 ha) of wetlands, there are many opportunities for boating and fishing in this forest. There are over 180 nesting pairs of bald eagles as well as Canada lynx, and sandhill cranes here.
Chugach	Lost Lake and mountains.	Alaska; 60°28′N 149°07′W	Anchorage, AK	July 23, 1907	5,419,095 acres (21,930.3 km^{2})	As the third largest national forest, Chugach covers three unique landscapes: the Copper River Delta, Eastern Kenai Peninsula, and Prince William Sound. Many of the streams contain salmon and trout, and glaciers still carve the land here. Over half of the forest is tundra and glaciers.
Cibola	View of a ridge from the Sandia Crest Trail.	New Mexico; 34°20′N 107°35′W	Albuquerque, NM	November 6, 1906	1,616,435 acres (6,541.5 km^{2})	Part of this national forest are four wilderness areas, including the Sandia Mountain Wilderness east of Albuquerque. Elevations range from 5,000 ft (1,500 m) to 11,301 ft (3,445 m) at the summit of Mount Taylor, a stratovolcano in the San Mateo Mountains.
Cleveland	Cleveland National Forest near Mount Laguna.	California; 32°45′N 116°36′W	San Diego, CA	February 25, 1893	425,580 acres (1,722.3 km^{2})	In southern California, Cleveland National Forest has a Mediterranean climate and four wilderness areas. There are 22 endangered plant and animal species found in the forest. With its highest point at 6,271 ft (1,911 m) on Monument Peak, elevations are not as high here as in most of California's other national forests.
Coconino	Sycamore Canyon viewed from Barney Pasture.	Arizona; 34°45′N 111°33′W	Flagstaff, AZ	August 17, 1898	1,852,201 acres (7,495.6 km^{2})	The San Francisco Peaks, Mogollon Rim, and Oak Creek Canyon can be found in Coconino National Forest. The forest's Sycamore Canyon is the second largest canyon in Arizona's redrock country. The forest also contains Humphreys Peak, which at 12,637 ft (3,852 m) is the highest point in Arizona.
Colville	Colville National Forest with a lake and mountains.	Washington; 48°32′N 117°54′W	Colville, WA	March 1, 1907	954,668 acres (3,863.4 km^{2})	With 486 mi (782 km) of hiking trails, Colville National Forest has elevations that range up to 7,300 ft (2,200 m) in the Kettle River and Selkirk mountains. Part of the Salmo-Priest Wilderness is in the forest along with part of the Pacific Northwest National Scenic Trail.
Conecuh	Open Pond and pine trees.	Alabama; 31°05′N 86°38′W	Montgomery, AL	July 17, 1936	83,983 acres (339.9 km^{2})	Managed together with Alabama's other national forests, Conecuh has two areas designated for recreation: Blue Lake and Open Pond. The dry, sandy uplands support longleaf pine forest, while bottomlands have sinkhole ponds, springs, and swamps.
Coronado	Mountains and forest west of Paradise, Arizona.	Arizona, New Mexico; 32°30′N 110°40′W	Tucson, AZ	April 11, 1902	1,718,945 acres (6,956.3 km^{2})	Covering the sky islands of the Southwest, Coronado National Forest also includes Mount Wrightson and the birding destination of Madera Canyon. There are eight wilderness areas in the forest as well as observatories on Mount Hopkins and Mount Lemmon
Croatan	Swamp along the Patsy Pond Nature Trail.	North Carolina; 34°52′N 77°00′W	Asheville, NC	July 29, 1936	161,325 acres (652.9 km^{2})	The only coastal National Forest on the east coast, Croatan includes estuaries and pocosins. The forest is home to carnivorous plants such as the Venus flytrap and pitcher plant. Cedar Point is a recreation area at the mouth of the White Oak River.
Custer	A mountain goat below Granite Peak.	Montana, South Dakota; 45°30′N 106°00′W	Bozeman, MT	March 2, 1907	1,189,465 acres (4,813.6 km^{2})	Custer National Forest includes the Beartooth Highway and the Capitol Rock and the Castles National Natural Landmarks. The forest's Absaroka–Beartooth Wilderness includes Granite Peak, the highest point in Montana at 12,807 ft (3,904 m).
Daniel Boone	The forest viewed from Tater Knob.	Kentucky; 37°17′N 83°52′W	Winchester, KY	February 23, 1937	564,168 acres (2,283.1 km^{2})	Encompassing part of the Cumberland Plateau and Appalachian Mountains, Daniel Boone National Forest has two wilderness areas and several reservoirs. Scenic areas include Cumberland Falls, Red River Gorge, Yahoo Arch and many caves.
Davy Crockett	Ratcliff Lake.	Texas; 31°18′N 95°06′W	Lufkin, TX	October 13, 1936	161,140 acres (652.1 km^{2})	Located where the southeastern pine forests meet the blackland prairies of central Texas, Davy Crockett National Forest's Big Slough Wilderness consists primarily hardwood forest. A recreation area surrounds Ratcliff Lake, which covers 45 acres (18 ha).
Delta	A sign for Sunflower Wildlife Management Area in Delta National Forest.	Mississippi; 32°45′N 90°46′W	Jackson, MS	January 12, 1961	62,109 acres (251.3 km^{2})	Delta National Forest contains the only bottomland hardwood forest in the National Forest System, located in the floodplain of the Mississippi River. The forest includes the Green Ash-Overcup Oak-Sweetgum Research Natural Areas, which is a National Natural Landmark because it contains remnant bottomland old-growth forest.
Deschutes	View to the northeast across Lava Lake with three volcanic mountains in the background: South Sister, Broken Top, and Mount Bachelor.	Oregon; 43°50′N 121°32′W	Bend, OR	July 1, 1908	1,612,218 acres (6,524.4 km^{2})	On the east side of the Cascade Range, Deschutes National Forest includes Newberry National Volcanic Monument and five wilderness areas. Lava River Cave, at 5,211 ft (1,588 m) long, is Oregon's longest lava tube.
De Soto	Pine forest in De Soto.	Mississippi; 31°02′N 88°59′W	Jackson, MS	June 17, 1936	532,100 acres (2,153.3 km^{2})	De Soto National Forest contains Mississippi's only wilderness areas: Black Creek and Leaf River. The Black Creek and Tuxachanie National Recreation Trails provide 60 mi (97 km) of hiking opportunities. Black Creek has been designated a National Wild and Scenic River for 21 mi (34 km).
Dixie	Scenic Byway 12 in Red Canyon.	Utah; 38°15′N 111°30′W	Cedar City, UT	September 25, 1905	1,885,655 acres (7,631.0 km^{2})	Straddling the divide between the Great Basin and Colorado River, Dixie National Forest has elevations ranging from 2,800 ft (850 m) near St. George to 11,322 ft (3,451 m) on Boulder Mountain. Ashdown Gorge, Box-Death Hollow, Cottonwood Forest, and Pine Valley Mountain wilderness areas are in the forest.
Eldorado	Mountains and forest along the trail to Winnemucca Lake.	California, Nevada; 38°47′N 120°19′W	Placerville, CA	July 28, 1910	695,098 acres (2,813.0 km^{2})	In the Sierra Nevada, Eldorado National Forest has 611 mi (983 km) of fishable streams and 297 lakes and reservoirs. There are 349 mi (562 km) of trails and 2,367 mi (3,809 km) of roads in the forest. The forest's Desolation Wilderness is the most visited wilderness area per acre in the country.
El Yunque	Forested mountainsides in El Yunque.	Puerto Rico; 18°17′N 65°48′W	Río Grande, PR	January 17, 1903	28,683 acres (116.1 km^{2})	The only tropical rainforest in the National Forest System, higher elevations of El Yunque National Forest receive nearly 200 in (510 cm) of rainfall per year. There are 240 tree species in the forest, 23 of which are endemic to the forest, being found nowhere else in the world.
Finger Lakes	Overlooking the hills, forest, and surrounding area in Finger Lakes National Forest.	New York; 42°31′N 76°47′W	Rutland, VT	1983	16,352 acres (66.2 km^{2})	Located between Seneca and Cayuga lakes, Finger Lakes National Forest is one of the smallest national forests. The Gorge Trail enters a small gorge in the forest, and the North Country Trail crosses part of the forest.
Fishlake	Aspens during fall in the mountains of the Richfield Ranger District.	Utah; 38°42′N 111°57′W	Richfield, UT	February 10, 1899	1,452,969 acres (5,880.0 km^{2})	Located in south central Utah, Fishlake National Forest is named for Fish Lake, the state's largest natural mountain lake. The forest's Tushar Mountains reach their highest point at 12,174 ft (3,711 m) on Delano Peak. The forest is home to Pando, a clonal colony of an individual male quaking aspen determined to be the largest and most dense organism ever found.
Flathead	Big Salmon Lake and the Bob Marshall Wilderness.	Montana; 48°01′N 113°48′W	Kalispell, MT	February 22, 1897	2,413,573 acres (9,767.4 km^{2})	Bordering Glacier National Park, Flathead is home to grizzly bears, bull trout, and Canada lynx. The forest manages four wilderness areas, including the Bob Marshall and Great Bear wildernesses.
Francis Marion	A trail through pine forest.	South Carolina; 33°10′N 79°42′W	Columbia, SC	July 10, 1936	258,673 acres (1,046.8 km^{2})	Francis Marion National Forest is home to 150 mi (240 km) of streams and a variety of wildlife, including the endangered red-cockaded woodpecker. There are four wilderness areas in the forest, and it is managed together with Sumter National Forest.
Fremont–Winema Fremont, Winema	View from Drake Peak lookout	Oregon; 42°34′N 120°52′W	Lakeview, OR	September 17, 1906	2,253,796 acres (9,120.8 km^{2})	Encompassing the Warner Mountains and bordering Crater Lake National Park, Fremont–Winema National Forest also includes the semi-arid areas of the Oregon Outback. The Gearhart Mountain Wilderness is near the center of the forest.
Gallatin	Mountains around Daisy Pass.	Montana; 45°15′N 111°00′W	Bozeman, MT	February 10, 1899	1,849,701 acres (7,485.5 km^{2})	Bordering the north side of Yellowstone National Park, Gallatin National Forest contains parts of both the Absaroka–Beartooth and Lee Metcalf wilderness areas. Quake Lake was formed on the Madison River when an earthquake launched a landslide across the river in 1959.
George Washington and Jefferson George Washington, Jefferson	Forested mountains viewed from the White Rocks on Little Sluice Mountain.	Virginia, West Virginia, Kentucky; 38°12′N 79°21′W	Roanoke, VA	May 16, 1918	1,792,209 acres (7,252.8 km^{2})	In the Appalachian Mountains, the highest point of the forest is Mount Rogers, also the highest point in Virginia at 5,729 ft (1,746 m) in Mount Rogers National Recreation Area. There are 230,000 acres (93,000 ha) of old-growth forest here, and the Blue Ridge Parkway and Appalachian Trail both run through the forest.
Gifford Pinchot	Partially snow-covered Old Snowy Mountain.	Washington; 46°10′N 121°48′W	Vancouver, WA	July 1, 1908	1,312,274 acres (5,310.6 km^{2})	Gifford Pinchot National Forest includes Mount St. Helens National Volcanic Monument and parts of seven wilderness areas. There are 1,475 mi (2,374 km) of trails and 4,104 mi (6,605 km) of roads in the forest.
Gila	Mountains and valleys in Gila National Forest.	New Mexico; 33°17′N 108°20′W	Silver City, NM	March 2, 1899	2,658,321 acres (10,757.8 km^{2})	The forest's Gila Wilderness was the world's first wilderness area and was proclaimed on June 3, 1924. The Catwalk National Recreation Trail travels up a narrow canyon for 1.1 mi (1.8 km) while following Whitewater Creek.
Grand Mesa	The northwestern edge of Grand Mesa from the south.	Colorado; 39°05′N 107°54′W	Delta, CO	July 1, 1908	345,939 acres (1,400.0 km^{2})	In western Colorado, Grand Mesa National Forest covers part of Battlement Mesa and most of Grand Mesa, the largest flattop mountain in the world with an average elevation of 10,500 ft (3,200 m). There are over 300 lakes in the forest. It is managed together with Gunnison National Forest and Uncompahgre National Forest.
Green Mountain	Trees in fall along a road near the Hapgood Pond Recreation Area.	Vermont; 43°18′N 73°00′W	Rutland, VT	April 25, 1932	408,419 acres (1,652.8 km^{2})	In Vermont's Green Mountains, this forest includes eight wilderness areas. Among the 900 mi (1,400 km) of trails in the forest are the Appalachian Trail and two National Recreation Trails: Long and Robert Frost.
Gunnison	Mountains in spring along the Copper Lake Trail near Crested Butte.	Colorado; 38°41′N 106°41′W	Delta, CO	May 12, 1905	1,666,514 acres (6,744.1 km^{2})	Gunnison National Forest is located in the Rocky Mountains near Gunnison, Colorado. Among the seven wilderness areas in the forest are the Maroon Bells–Snowmass Wilderness. The Slumgullion Slide is a giant landslide due to the mineral montmorillonite.
Helena–Lewis and Clark Helena, Lewis and Clark	A riding ranger with mules near the Chinese Wall.	Montana; 46°33′N 112°12′W	Helena, MT	February 22, 1897	2,857,401 acres (11,563.5 km^{2})	Located in north-central Montana, this forest includes large portions of the Bob Marshall and Scapegoat wilderness areas. The forest operates the Lewis and Clark Interpretive Center in Great Falls. The Continental Divide Trail travels almost 80 mi (130 km) through the forest, which surrounds Montana's capital city. The Elkhorn Mountains are the only Wildlife Management unit in the National Forest System.
Hiawatha	A forest sign along road M-28 in Hiawatha National Forest.	Michigan; 46°10′N 86°40′W	Escanaba, MI	January 16, 1931	898,475 acres (3,636.0 km^{2})	Located in Michigan's Upper Peninsula, Hiawatha National Forest borders Lake Superior, Lake Michigan, and Lake Huron. The forest is home to Grand Island National Recreation Area and five wilderness areas.
Holly Springs	A cypress swamp in Holly Springs National Forest.	Mississippi; 34°34′N 89°18′W	Jackson, MS	June 15, 1936	156,243 acres (632.3 km^{2})	In north-central Mississippi, Holly Springs National Forest has small lakes in upland forests and unique bottomlands. Chewalla and Puskus recreation areas surround the namesake lakes and have boat launches.
Homochitto	A sign for Homochitto National Forest.	Mississippi; 31°26′N 90°56′W	Jackson, MS	July 20, 1936	192,237 acres (778.0 km^{2})	Located in southern Mississippi, this forest is named for the Homochitto River, meaning "Big Red River." Most of the forest is densely forested hills, but there are recreation facilities at Pipes Lake, Clear Springs, and Mount Nebo.
Hoosier	A hazy fall day over the hills in Hoosier National Forest.	Indiana; 38°31′N 86°31′W	Bedford, IN	October 1, 1961	203,627 acres (824.0 km^{2})	The Pioneer Mothers Memorial Forest is 88 acres (36 ha) of old-growth forest in Hoosier National Forest. The forest's Charles C. Deam Wilderness is Indiana's only wilderness area.
Humboldt–Toiyabe Humboldt, Toiyabe	Aspen in Lamoille Canyon surrounded by mountains.	Nevada, California; 40°23′N 115°33′W	Sparks, NV	May 3, 1906	6,290,945 acres (25,458.6 km^{2})	As the largest national forest outside of Alaska, Humboldt–Toiyabe occupies many of the mountains of Nevada's Basin and Range Province. Spring Mountains National Recreation Area is located near Las Vegas and is part of the forest.
Huron–Manistee Huron, Manistee	Benton Lake and surrounding forests.	Michigan; 44°33′N 83°52′W	Cadillac, MI	July 30, 1928	975,130 acres (3,946.2 km^{2})	Loda Lake National Wildflower Sanctuary is located around a small spring-fed lake in the forest. The Nordhouse Dunes Wilderness has sand dunes up to 140 ft (43 m) high along Lake Michigan.
Idaho Panhandle Coeur d'Alene, St. Joe, Kaniksu	Revett Lake and surrounding mountains and forests from above.	Idaho, Montana, Washington; 47°43′N 116°13′W	Coeur d'Alene, ID	November 6, 1906	3,074,438 acres (12,441.8 km^{2})	There are two wilderness areas, Cabinet Mountains and Salmo-Priest, and numerous recreation opportunities in Idaho Panhandle National Forest. This forest ranges from the Canada–US border to the Saint Joe River, which is the highest navigable river in the world.
Inyo	Mount Whitney from the Whitney Portal Trailhead.	California, Nevada; 37°30′N 118°39′W	Bishop, CA	May 25, 1907	1,957,264 acres (7,920.8 km^{2})	Located in the Sierra Nevada, Inyo includes Mono Lake, bristlecone pines, the Long Valley Caldera, nine wilderness areas, and Mount Whitney, which at 14,505 ft (4,421 m) is the highest point in the United States outside of Alaska.
Kaibab	Aspens and a meadow in fall.	Arizona; 35°56′N 112°09′W	Williams, AZ	July 1, 1908	1,561,060 acres (6,317.4 km^{2})	Located on the Colorado Plateau to both the north and south of Grand Canyon National Park, elevations in Kaibab National Forest reach 10,418 ft (3,175 m) on Kendrick Mountain in the Kendrick Mountain Wilderness. There are over 300 mi (480 km) of trails in the forest, including through the Kanab Creek Wilderness.
Kisatchie	The Kisatchie Bayou.	Louisiana; 31°00′N 92°37′W	Pineville, LA	June 10, 1930	607,540 acres (2,458.6 km^{2})	Kisatchie is Louisiana's only national forest, covering old-growth pine forest and bald cypress groves in the bayous. There are 48 mammal species, 56 reptiles, 30 amphibians, and 155 breeding or overwintering birds in this forest.
Klamath	A road through the forest.	California, Oregon; 41°30′N 123°08′W	Yreka, CA	May 6, 1905	1,672,442 acres (6,768.1 km^{2})	Straddling the California–Oregon border, this forest has part of five wilderness areas, 152 mi (245 km) of wild and scenic rivers, and 200 mi (320 km) of rivers for rafting, including on the Klamath River. The Siskiyou mariposa lily is endemic to the forest, being found nowhere else in the world.
Kootenai	Snow-capped mountains in Kootenai National Forest.	Montana, Idaho; 48°32′N 115°26′W	Libby, MT	August 13, 1906	1,810,361 acres (7,326.3 km^{2})	Kootenai includes the Cabinet Mountains and the Kootenay and Clark Fork rivers. The Noxon and Cabinet Gorge reservoirs are on the Clark Fork within the forest. The Northwest Peak Scenic Area is in the Selkirk Mountains.
Lake Tahoe Basin Management Unit	Lake Tahoe.	California, Nevada 38°55′N 119°58′W	South Lake Tahoe, CA	April 1973	152,008 acres (615.2 km^{2})	The Forest Service lands surrounding Lake Tahoe are managed by the Lake Tahoe Basin Management Unit, which was created in April 1973 in order to protect the lake's unique ecological and recreational values.^{E}
Land Between The Lakes	Scenic lake2	Kentucky, Tennessee 36°46′39″N 88°3′47″W	Golden Pond, KY	June 1963	171,251 acres (693.0 km^{2})	Land Between The Lakes National Recreation Area is located in Western Kentucky and Tennessee, and encompasses over 170,000 acres of forests, wetlands, and open lands on the largest inland peninsula in the United States. It is located between Kentucky Lake and Lake Barkley.
Lassen	Echo Lake.	California; 40°05′N 121°14′W	Susanville, CA	June 2, 1905	1,066,027 acres (4,314.1 km^{2})	Surrounding Lassen Volcanic National Park, this forest has three wilderness areas and 92,000 acres (37,000 ha) of old-growth Sierra Nevada mixed conifer forests. Subway Cave is a lava tube that is 0.3 mi (0.48 km) long and open to the public.
Lincoln	Partially forested mountains in Lincoln National Forest.	New Mexico; 32°57′N 105°26′W	Alamogordo, NM	July 26, 1902	1,095,470 acres (4,433.2 km^{2})	With portions of four mountain ranges, the Capitan, Guadalupe, Sacramento, and Sierra Blanca, elevations range from 4,000 ft (1,200 m) to 11,500 ft (3,500 m) in Lincoln National Forest. The forest was the birthplace of Smokey Bear.
Lolo	Rainy Lake and mountains.	Montana; 47°09′N 114°26′W	Missoula, MT	September 20, 1906	2,237,961 acres (9,056.7 km^{2})	Located west of the Continental Divide and containing parts of four wilderness areas, this forest has 700 mi (1,100 km) of trails and over 100 named lakes. There are at least 20 fish species, 60 mammals, 300 birds, and 1,500 plants in the forest.
Los Padres	Montane chaparral and mountains.	California; 34°32′N 119°46′W	Goleta, CA	March 2, 1898	1,772,237 acres (7,172.0 km^{2})	Encompassing portions of the California Coast and Transverse ranges of central California, Los Padres has ten wilderness areas covering about 48% of the forest. There are 1,257 mi (2,023 km) of trails and part of the Jacinto Reyes National Scenic Byway.
Malheur	Strawberry Lake and mountains in fall.	Oregon; 44°15′N 118°51′W	John Day, OR	July 1, 1908	1,480,818 acres (5,992.7 km^{2})	In the Blue Mountains of eastern Oregon, Malheur National Forest's highest point is Strawberry Mountain at 9,038 ft (2,755 m). The Cedar Grove Botanical Area contains the only stand of Alaska yellow cedar east of the Cascade Range in the United States.
Manti–La Sal	Mount Peale viewed from Mount Mellenthin.	Utah, Colorado; 38°23′N 109°01′W	Price, UT	May 29, 1903	1,269,984 acres (5,139.4 km^{2})	Including the La Sal and Abajo mountains of eastern Utah, elevations in this forest reach 12,721 ft (3,877 m) on Mount Peale. The Dark Canyon Wilderness is the only wilderness area in the forest.
Mark Twain	A kayaker on the St. Francis River.	Missouri; 37°00′N 91°30′W	Rolla, MO	September 11, 1939	1,504,881 acres (6,090.0 km^{2})	Missouri's only national forest, Mark Twain contains seven wilderness areas and the Eleven Point National Wild and Scenic River. There are 19 natural areas in the forest that are managed by the Missouri Department of Conservation.
Medicine Bow–Routt Medicine Bow, Routt	Mountains and grasslands surrounding a work center.	Colorado, Wyoming; 41°14′N 106°15′W	Laramie, WY	May 22, 1902	2,210,327 acres (8,944.9 km^{2})	This forest contains many ranges of the Rocky Mountains with elevations ranging from 5,500 ft (1,700 m) to 12,940 ft (3,940 m). There are ten wilderness areas and Rob Roy Reservoir, which covers 500 acres (200 ha).
Mendocino	Howard Lake and forested mountains.	California; 39°38′N 122°51′W	Willows, CA	July 1, 1908	915,532 acres (3,705.0 km^{2})	Mendocino is the only national forest in California not crossed by a paved highway. The forest's Genetic Resource and Conservation Center produces plants for reforestation, watershed restoration, wildlife recovery, and other projects.
Modoc	The summit trail and surrounding mountains.	California; 41°34′N 120°53′W	Alturas, CA	November 29, 1904	1,680,405 acres (6,800.4 km^{2})	Modoc National Forest contains the Medicine Lake Volcano, which has an elevation of 7,921 ft (2,414 m) and is the largest shield volcano in North America. There are 43,400 acres (17,600 ha) of old-growth forest here along with Mill Creek Falls in the South Warner Wilderness.
Monongahela	Seneca Rock.	West Virginia; 38°33′N 79°54′W	Elkins, WV	April 28, 1920	920,583 acres (3,725.5 km^{2})	Monongahela National Forest includes Spruce Knob–Seneca Rocks National Recreation Area and eight wilderness areas. Spruce Knob is the highest point in West Virginia at 4,863 ft (1,482 m), and Seneca Rocks is a 900 ft (270 m) quartzite crag.
Mount Baker–Snoqualmie Mount Baker, Snoqualmie	Table Mountain and its reflection in a lake	Washington; 48°28′N 121°25′W	Everett, WA	February 22, 1897	2,562,955 acres (10,371.9 km^{2})	In the Cascade Range, this forest includes Mount Baker, at an elevation of 10,781 ft (3,286 m), a glaciated stratovolcano. Mount Baker National Recreation Area, the Pacific Crest Trail, Pacific Northwest National Scenic Trail, and portions of ten wilderness areas are in the forest.
Mount Hood	Mount Hood and its reflection in Mirror Lake.	Oregon; 45°16′N 121°49′W	Sandy, OR	June 17, 1892	1,069,427 acres (4,327.8 km^{2})	This forest is named for and contains Mount Hood, the highest point in Oregon at 11,249 ft (3,429 m). The forest stretches from the Columbia River Gorge and includes Mount Hood National Recreation Area and nine wilderness areas.
Nantahala	Dry Falls.	North Carolina; 35°12′N 83°33′W	Asheville, NC	February 6, 1907	532,300 acres (2,154.1 km^{2})	In southwestern North Carolina, this forest includes the Nantahala Gorge and Nantahala River. There are 600 mi (970 km) of trails in the forest with elevations ranging from 1,200 ft (370 m) to 5,800 ft (1,800 m) on Lone Bald.
Nebraska	Forest and grasslands in the Bessey Ranger District.	Nebraska; 41°42′N 100°22′W	Chadron, NE	April 16, 1902	140,813 acres (569.8 km^{2})	This forest was created in 1902 by Charles E. Bessey as an experiment to see if a forest could be created in treeless areas of the Great Plains for use as a national timber reserve. The Bessey Nursery is located in the northwest corner of the forest's Bessey Ranger District.
Nez Perce–Clearwater National Forests Nez Perce, Clearwater	Crooked Creek in fall.	Idaho; 45°27′N 115°55′W	Kamiah, ID	July 1, 1908	3,936,355 acres (15,929.9 km^{2})	Nez Perce National Forest includes parts of four wilderness areas: Frank Church–River of No Return, Gospel Hump, Hells Canyon, and Selway–Bietterroot. Clearwater National Forest covers the Bitterroot Mountains and Palouse Prairie as well as the Clearwater and Lochsa rivers. The Lewis and Clark Expedition followed the Lolo Trail through the forest in 1805, and gold miners came to the forest in the 1860s.
Ocala	A pond in Farles Prairie.	Florida; 29°12′N 81°44′W	Tallahassee, FL	November 24, 1908	384,693 acres (1,556.8 km^{2})	Ocala protects the world's largest sand pine scrub forest. There are more than 600 lakes, rivers, and springs in the forest along with four wilderness areas. There are over 600 lakes and part of the Florida Trail in the forest.
Ochoco	Steins Pillar.	Oregon; 44°22′N 120°07′W	Prineville, OR	July 1, 1911	854,817 acres (3,459.3 km^{2})	Ochoco National Forest contains a variety of odd geological formations, 95,000 acres (38,000 ha) of old-growth forest, the headwaters of the Crooked River, and three wilderness areas. Stein's Pillar is a 350 ft (110 m) tall rock column in the Ochoco Mountains.
Okanogan–Wenatchee Okanogan, Wenatchee	A lake and the surrounding mountains and forest viewed from Maple Pass.	Washington; 48°38′N 119°35′W	Wenatchee, WA	July 1, 1911	4,255,572 acres (17,221.7 km^{2})	Located on the eastern side of the Cascade Range, this forest stretches from the Canada–US border to the Columbia and Okanogan rivers. There are 1,285 mi (2,068 km) of trails in the forest, including part of the Pacific Crest Trail.
Olympic	Forests and the Olympic Mountains from Hurricane Ridge.	Washington; 48°07′N 124°15′W	Olympia, WA	February 22, 1897	631,808 acres (2,556.8 km^{2})	Olympic National Forest surrounds Olympic National Park on the Olympic Peninsula of Washington. There are five wilderness areas, occupying about 14% of the forest. This part of Washington receives more rainfall annually than anywhere else in the United States.
Osceola	Pine forest with palmetto understory.	Florida; 30°19′N 82°27′W	Tallahassee, FL	July 10, 1931	160,192 acres (648.3 km^{2})	The Big Gum Swamp Wilderness is the forest's only wilderness area, and the Osceola Research Natural Area was designated a National Natural Landmark in 1974. The Civil War Battle of Olustee occurred in what is now the forest, and 23 mi (37 km) of the Florida National Scenic Trail pass through the forest.
Ottawa	Pines along Kathryn Lake.	Michigan; 46°27′N 89°15′W	Ironwood, MI	January 27, 1931	990,961 acres (4,010.3 km^{2})	Located in the Upper Peninsula of Michigan, Ottawa National Forest stretches from Lake Superior to the Wisconsin border. There are 500 named lakes, nearly 2,000 mi (3,200 km) of streams, and three wilderness areas in the forest.
Ouachita	The view across Ouachita National Forest from atop the Standing Stairs Mountains.	Arkansas, Oklahoma; 34°38′N 94°04′W	Hot Springs, AR	December 18, 1907	1,785,468 acres (7,225.5 km^{2})	Including the namesake Ouachita Mountains, this forest has nearly 800,000 acres (320,000 ha) of old-growth forest. The forest has two wilderness areas: Black Fork Mountain and Upper Kiamichi River.
Ozark–St. Francis Ozark, St. Francis	View of the Ozarks from atop White Rock Mountain.	Arkansas; 35°42′N 93°21′W	Russellville, AR	March 5, 1908	1,153,374 acres (4,667.5 km^{2})	Ozark–St. Francis National Forest has more than 400 mi (640 km) of trails, including the Ozark Highlands Trail. Blanchard Springs Caverns is a three level cave system that is open for public tours.
Payette	The Seven Devils Mountains in winter.	Idaho; 45°05′N 115°48′W	McCall, ID	June 3, 1905	2,326,779 acres (9,416.1 km^{2})	Payette National Forest includes the Seven Devils Mountains and part of the Frank Church–River of No Return Wilderness. It also borders Hells Canyon to the west and contains the Brundage Mountain ski area.
Pike	A lake and mountains in Pike National Forest.	Colorado; 39°10′N 105°27′W	Pueblo, CO	February 11, 1892	1,096,146 acres (4,435.9 km^{2})	Pike National Forest includes Pikes Peak at an elevation of 14,115 ft (4,302 m) and three wilderness areas. Since 1975 the forest has been managed together with San Isabel National Forest.
Pisgah	Upper Creek Falls.	North Carolina; 35°48′N 82°20′W	Asheville, NC	October 17, 1916	509,283 acres (2,061.0 km^{2})	Elevations in Pisgah National Forest reach over 6,000 ft (1,800 m), and there are 46,600 acres (18,900 ha) of old-growth forests, including 10,000 acres (4,000 ha) in Linville Gorge. There are three wilderness areas in the forest: Linville Gorge, Middle Prong, and Shining Rock.
Plumas	Bucks Lake.	California; 39°56′N 120°49′W	Quincy, CA	March 27, 1905	1,189,554 acres (4,814.0 km^{2})	There are 127,000 acres (51,000 ha) of old-growth forest in Plumas National Forest. The Little Grass Valley Recreation Area surrounds Little Grass Valley Reservoir and includes a campground and boat launch, among other facilities and services.
Prescott	A lake near Mingus Mountain.	Arizona; 34°35′N 112°36′W	Prescott, AZ	May 10, 1898	1,257,005 acres (5,086.9 km^{2})	Vegetation in Prescott National Forest ranges from that characteristic of the Sonoran Desert at lower elevations to Ponderosa pine at higher elevations. There are eight wilderness areas and 450 mi (720 km) of trails in the forest
Rio Grande	Mountains along the Stony Pass Road.	Colorado; 37°43′N 106°37′W	Monte Vista, CO	July 1, 1908	1,837,661 acres (7,436.8 km^{2})	The headwaters of the Rio Grande are in the San Juan Mountains in the western part of the forest, while the Sangre de Cristo Mountains form the eastern boundary. Elevations reach 14,345 ft (4,372 m) at the summit of Blanca Peak, overlooking the San Luis Valley and Great Sand Dunes National Park.
Rogue River–Siskiyou Rogue River, Siskiyou	The Rabbit Ears, a pair of spires, rise above the coniferous forest of the Rogue River–Siskiyou NF	Oregon, California; 41°58′N 123°08′W	Medford, OR	September 28, 1893	1,718,893 acres (6,956.1 km^{2})	This forest ranges from the Cascade Range to the Siskiyou Mountains, and the Rogue River drains over 75% of the forest's area. There are parts of eight wilderness areas in the forest as well as what may be the world's tallest pine tree, a ponderosa pine that is 268.35 ft (81.79 m) tall.
Roosevelt	Mountains surrounding Lake Isabelle.	Colorado; 40°32′N 105°35′W	Fort Collins, CO	May 22, 1902	814,090 acres (3,294.5 km^{2})	Located in the Rocky Mountains of northern Colorado, Roosevelt National Forest has part of six wilderness areas. It is managed together with Arapaho National Forest and Pawnee National Grassland.
Sabine	A sign for Sabine National Forest.	Texas; 31°30′N 93°52′W	Lufkin, TX	October 13, 1936	161,088 acres (651.9 km^{2})	Sabine National Forest borders the western side of Toledo Bend Reservoir and has 28 mi (45 km) of trails. The forest's only wilderness area is the Indian Mounds Wilderness. Old-growth forest can be found in the wilderness and at Mill Creek Cove along the reservoir's shores.
Salmon–Challis Salmon, Challis	Borah Peak and the Lost River Range in winter.	Idaho; 45°07′N 114°09′W	Salmon, ID	July 1, 1908	4,226,973 acres (17,106.0 km^{2})	Salmon–Challis National Forest includes parts of both the Salmon River and the Frank Church–River of No Return Wilderness. Idaho's highest point, Borah Peak at 12,662 ft (3,859 m), is located in the Lost River Range in the forest.
Sam Houston	A hardwood swamp.	Texas; 30°32′N 95°21′W	Lufkin, TX	October 13, 1936	163,264 acres (660.7 km^{2})	Part of the Lone Star Trail travels through Sam Houston National Forest, which borders parts of Lake Conroe and Lake Livingston. The Little Lake Creek Wilderness is the only wilderness area in the forest.
Samuel R. McKelvie	Grassland approaching the forest edge.	Nebraska; 42°43′N 101°02′W	Chadron, NE	October 15, 1971	115,847 acres (468.8 km^{2})	Located in the Sandhills of Nebraska, Samuel R. McKelvie National Forest is a combination of prairie and trees planted since 1903, of which ponderosa pine has been most successful.
San Bernardino	Mount Baldy viewed from Silverwood Lake.	California; 34°03′N 116°57′W	San Bernardino, CA	February 25, 1893	678,980 acres (2,747.7 km^{2})	San Bernardino National Forest includes part of the Santa Rosa and San Jacinto Mountains National Monument. The forest surrounds Lake Arrowhead and other reservoirs.
San Isabel	A valley in the mountains of San Isabel National Forest.	Colorado; 38°24′N 105°56′W	Pueblo, CO	April 11, 1902	1,108,639 acres (4,486.5 km^{2})	There are 19 of Colorado's 54 fourteeners in San Isabel National Forest, including the highest point, Mount Elbert at 14,440 ft (4,400 m). The forest includes the Sawatch Range, Collegiate Peaks, and Sangre de Cristo Range and is managed together with Pike National Forest.
San Juan	Mountains in San Juan National Forest.	Colorado; 37°30′N 107°39′W	Durango, CO	June 3, 1905	1,864,595 acres (7,545.7 km^{2})	San Juan National Forest includes Chimney Rock National Monument and elevations that range from 5,000 ft (1,500 m) to over 14,000 ft (4,300 m). The forest's Weminuche Wilderness is the largest in Colorado at 499,771 acres (202,250 ha).
Santa Fe	Aspens and snow-capped mountains in late fall.	New Mexico; 35°54′N 106°13′W	Santa Fe, NM	January 11, 1892	1,544,748 acres (6,251.4 km^{2})	Santa Fe National Forest's highest point is Truchas Peak at 13,103 ft (3,994 m) in the Pecos Wilderness. There are 1,002 mi (1,613 km) of trails in the forest, which includes the Valles Caldera National Preserve.
Sawtooth	Stanley Lake and McGown Peak.	Idaho, Utah; 41°54′N 113°29′W	Twin Falls, ID	May 29, 1905	1,802,133 acres (7,293.0 km^{2})	Sawtooth National Forest includes over 1,100 lakes, 1,000 mi (1,600 km) of trails and roads, and ten mountain ranges, with the highest point at 12,009 ft (3,660 m) on Hyndman Peak. The forest includes Sawtooth National Recreation Area, the Sawtooth Range, Sawtooth Wilderness, four ski areas, and four endemic species, being found nowhere else in the world.
Sequoia	Giant sequoias.	California; 36°03′N 118°31′W	Porterville, CA	July 1, 1908	1,139,240 acres (4,610.3 km^{2})	Sequoia National Forest includes Giant Sequoia National Monument, both named for the giant sequoia, the largest tree species in the world. There are 2,500 mi (4,000 km) of maintained and abandoned roads and 850 mi (1,370 km) of trails in the forest, including the Pacific Crest Trail.
Shasta–Trinity Shasta, Trinity	The Trinity Alps near Granite Lake.	California; 41°08′N 122°12′W	Redding, CA	April 26, 1905	2,229,286 acres (9,021.6 km^{2})	There are 6,278 mi (10,103 km) of streams in the forest, and elevations range from 1,000 ft (300 m) to 14,179 ft (4,322 m) on Mount Shasta. Five wilderness areas and 460 mi (740 km) of trails can be found in the forest.
Shawnee	The Garden of the Gods at sunset.	Illinois; 37°30′N 88°48′W	Harrisburg, IL	September 6, 1939	273,482 acres (1,106.7 km^{2})	As Illinois's only national forest, Shawnee is located in the southern part of the state and contains seven wilderness areas, including the Garden of the Gods. Among the many miles of hiking trails in the forest is the River to River Trail, which is 160 mi (260 km) long.
Shoshone	Pingora Peak and Lonesome Lake.	Wyoming; 44°02′N 109°32′W	Cody, WY	March 30, 1891	2,439,093 acres (9,870.7 km^{2})	Located in the Greater Yellowstone Ecosystem, this forest includes part of the Absaroka, Beartooth, and Wind River mountain ranges. Five wilderness areas make up 56% of the forest, and elevations reach 13,804 ft (4,207 m) at Gannett Peak, the highest point in Wyoming.
Sierra	Lake of the Lone Indian and surrounding mountains.	California; 37°16′N 119°12′W	Clovis, CA	February 14, 1893	1,311,231 acres (5,306.4 km^{2})	Sierra National Forest is located on the western slope of the Sierra Nevada and elevations reach 13,986 ft (4,263 m). There are 1,800 mi (2,900 km) of streams, 480 lakes, 11 reservoirs, and 63 campgrounds in the forest.
Siuslaw	Sand dunes at Oregon Dune National Recreation Area.	Oregon; 44°32′N 123°53′W	Corvallis, OR	July 1, 1908	630,291 acres (2,550.7 km^{2})	Siuslaw National Forest includes Oregon Dunes National Recreation Area, three wilderness areas, and Cascade Head Scenic Research Area among the Central Oregon Coast Range. Marys Peak Scenic Botanical Area includes Marys Peak, which at 4,097 ft (1,249 m) is the forest's highest point.
Six Rivers	The Salmon River during spring.	California; 40°21′N 123°36′W	Eureka, CA	July 1, 1947	977,090 acres (3,954.1 km^{2})	Six Rivers National Forest was named for the Smith, Klamath, Trinity, Mad, Van Duzen, and Eel rivers. The forest includes the Salmon River system, all of which has been designated a National Wild and Scenic River.
Stanislaus	Cherry Lake and the surrounding forest.	California; 38°10′N 120°01′W	Sonora, CA	February 22, 1897	899,427 acres (3,639.9 km^{2})	Stanislaus National Forest has over 800 mi (1,300 km) of streams and four wilderness areas, including the Carson–Iceberg Wilderness. The Emigrant Wilderness borders the northwest corner of Yosemite National Park.
Sumter	A sign at the border of the Ellicott Rock Wilderness.	South Carolina; 34°00′N 82°15′W	Columbia, SC	July 13, 1936	372,778 acres (1,508.6 km^{2})	Sumter National Forest contains 22 waterfalls with drops ranging from 12 ft (3.7 m) to 150 ft (46 m) and part of the Ellicott Rock Wilderness, the only wilderness located in three states.
Superior	The view over the forest from Eagle Mountain.	Minnesota; 47°50′N 91°31′W	Duluth, MN	February 13, 1909	2,093,590 acres (8,472.5 km^{2})	Superior National Forest includes the Boundary Waters Canoe Area Wilderness, which has over 1,500 mi (2,400 km) of canoe routes, 1,000 lakes, and 2,200 designated campsites. Eagle Mountain, the highest point in Minnesota at 2,301 ft (701 m), is also in the forest.
Tahoe	A meadow with wildflowers.	California; 39°23′N 120°32′W	Nevada City, CA	April 13, 1899	872,981 acres (3,532.8 km^{2})	Tahoe National Forest is in the Sierra Nevada northwest of Lake Tahoe. Part of the Granite Chief Wilderness is within the forest. The Middle Fork of the American, Yuba, and North Yuba rivers cross or border the forest.
Talladega	Cheaha Lake at the base of Mount Cheaha from above.	Alabama; 33°26′N 85°51′W	Montgomery, AL	July 17, 1936	393,006 acres (1,590.4 km^{2})	Talladega National Forest includes the Cheaha and Dugger Mountain wilderness areas. The Talladega Scenic Byway and Pinhoti National Recreation Trail cross the forest. Talladega is managed together with Alabama's other national forests.
Tombigbee	The Lakeside Trail winding around Choctaw Lake.	Mississippi; 33°56′N 88°56′W	Jackson, MS	November 27, 1959	67,468 acres (273.0 km^{2})	Located in northeastern Mississippi, Tombigbee National Forest covers rolling hills that were abandoned farmland before the forest was established. It is managed together with Mississippi's other national forests.
Tongass	Mountains and water in Tongass National Forest.	Alaska; 56°48′N 133°54′W	Ketchikan, AK	September 10, 1907	16,748,360 acres (67,778.2 km^{2})	The largest national forest, Tongass spans 500 mi (800 km) in southeast Alaska from the Canada–US border to the Pacific Ocean. Nearly one-third of the forest is covered by 19 wilderness areas. The forest includes Misty Fjords and Admiralty Island National Monuments.
Tonto	Tonto National Forest canyons from above.	Arizona; 33°52′N 111°17′W	Phoenix, AZ	October 3, 1905	2,866,663 acres (11,601.0 km^{2})	Tonto National Forest stretches from the Sonoran Desert to the pine forests at the Mogollon Rim. There are eight wilderness areas and several lakes and reservoirs in the forest
Tuskegee	A bike along a trail in Tuskegee National Forest.	Alabama; 32°28′N 85°36′W	Montgomery, AL	November 27, 1959	11,349 acres (45.9 km^{2})	Tuskegee National Forest's Bartram National Recreation Trail was Alabama's first National Recreation Trail. Tuskegee is one of the smallest national forests and is managed together with Alabama's other national forests.
Uinta–Wasatch–Cache Uinta, Wasatch, Cache	Aspens below mountains in fall.	Utah, Wyoming, Idaho; 41°15′N 111°26′W	Salt Lake City, UT	February 22, 1897	2,492,404 acres (10,086.4 km^{2})	There are nine wilderness areas in the forest, which occupies part of the Wasatch and Uinta mountains. Mount Nebo and Mount Timpanogos are located in wilderness areas at the edge of the Wasatch Front.
Umatilla	A trail atop Oregon Butte.	Oregon, Washington; 45°38′N 118°11′W	Pendleton, OR	July 1, 1908	1,405,898 acres (5,689.5 km^{2})	Located in the Blue Mountains of northeastern Oregon, Umatilla National Forest includes three wilderness areas, occupying over 20% of the forest. The forest has over 715 mi (1,151 km) of trails, 2,000 mi (3,200 km) of roads, and one of the largest elk herds of any National Forest.
Umpqua	The Calapooya Mountains from Fairview Peak Lookout.	Oregon; 43°13′N 122°35′W	Roseburg, OR	March 2, 1907	986,120 acres (3,990.7 km^{2})	Umpqua National Forest is in the Cascade Range of southwestern Oregon and includes three wilderness areas. Watson Falls is a waterfall that is 272 ft (83 m) high on Watson Creek, a tributary of the Clearwater River.
Uncompahgre	Wetterhorn Peak.	Colorado; 38°16′N 108°07′W	Delta, CO	June 14, 1905	951,767 acres (3,851.7 km^{2})	The northern portion of the San Juan Mountains and the Uncompahgre Plateau are located in this national forest. The forest also contains Uncompahgre Gorge and three wilderness areas.
Uwharrie	A pond in Uwharrie National Forest.	North Carolina; 35°24′N 79°56′W	Asheville, NC	January 12, 1961	51,218 acres (207.3 km^{2})	Uwharrie National Forest borders the eastern side of Badin Lake and has one wilderness area: the Birkhead Mountains Wilderness. The forest is managed together with North Carolina's other national forests.
Wallowa–Whitman Wallowa, Whitman	The Wallowa Mountains.	Oregon, Idaho; 45°13′N 117°31′W	Baker City, OR	May 6, 1905	2,261,480 acres (9,151.9 km^{2})	Wallowa-Whitman National Forest stretches from the Blue Mountains to the Snake River. Elevations range from 875 ft (267 m) in Hells Canyon, the deepest gorge in North America, to 9,845 ft (3,001 m) at the summit of Sacajawea Peak in the Eagle Cap Wilderness Area.
Wayne	A sign for Wayne National Forest.	Ohio; 39°10′N 82°25′W	Nelsonville, OH	October 1, 1951	243,180 acres (984.1 km^{2})	Ohio's only national forest, Wayne is located in the Appalachian foothills and has over 300 mi (480 km) of trails. The North Country Trail passes through several sections of the forest.
White Mountain	The Sandwich Range in winter.	New Hampshire, Maine; 44°09′N 71°25′W	Campton, NH	May 16, 1918	761,687 acres (3,082.4 km^{2})	This national forest is located in the White Mountains, which the Appalachian Trail and White Mountain Scenic Byway pass through. The forest includes Mount Washington, which at 6,288 ft (1,917 m) is the highest point in the Northeast and the location of the fastest wind speed recorded on earth, although the summit is located in a state park.
White River	The Maroon Bells and Maroon Lake in fall	Colorado; 39°34′N 106°53′W	Glenwood Springs, CO	October 16, 1891	2,287,495 acres (9,257.2 km^{2})	White River National Forest has eight wilderness areas, twelve ski resorts, four large reservoirs, 2,500 mi (4,000 km) of trails, 1,900 mi (3,100 km) of roads, and ten peaks higher than 14,000 ft (4,300 m) in elevation.
Willamette	The Breitenbush River.	Oregon; 44°07′N 122°11′W	Springfield, OR	July 1, 1933	1,681,674 acres (6,805.5 km^{2})	Willamette National Forest is in the Cascade Range, stretching from Mount Jefferson to Mount Washington. About 20% of the forest is designated wilderness, but there are also 6,000 mi (9,700 km) of roads in the forest.
William B. Bankhead	Clear Creek.	Alabama; 34°14′N 87°20′W	Montgomery, AL	January 15, 1918	181,988 acres (736.5 km^{2})	This forest contains 153 mi (246 km) of trails and the Sipsey Wilderness, which at 24,922 acres (10,086 ha) is the largest wilderness area east of the Mississippi River. It is managed together with Alabama's other national forests.

== See also ==
- List of former national forests of the United States
- List of national parks of the United States
- National grassland
- The Origins of the National Forests (1992 book)

== Notes ==
- ^{A} Listed names of national forests represent the current management divisions of the National Forest System. Forests that are managed separately, such as Allegheny National Forest and Monongahela National Forest, are listed as separate forests. Forests that are managed together, however, may or may not be listed separately. Forests managed together and with hyphenated names, such as Salmon–Challis National Forest, are considered to be a single national forest. Forests that are managed together under titles such as Grand Mesa, Uncompahgre, and Gunnison National Forests, are considered to be separate forests. National forests listed in this column in small text are constituent national forests managed by, but not included in the name of, the named national forest in normal text. To reach the figure of 154 national forests, count hyphenated names as two forests, with the exception of Manti–La Sal, which is the official name of one forest. Uinta–Wasatch–Cache is counted as three, and George Washington and Jefferson is counted as two.
- ^{B} In the case of national forests in multiple states, the states are listed in descending order by land area of that forest contained in each state. States with the most area of that forest are listed first, while states with the least are listed last. Coordinates are those by the U.S. Board on Geographic Names, and may not be representative of the entire forest.
- ^{C} The history of the National Forest System is very complicated. Forests have been transferred between agencies, renamed, divided, consolidated, discontinued, established from parts of existing forests, had portions ceded to other forests, expanded from other lands, among various other actions. The date given represents the day: that forest was established as is, a predecessor forest with the same boundaries was established under a different name, or the earliest date of establishment of a forest that was combined in whole with another forest.
- ^{D} Forests with citations to the three books in the This Land series by Robert H. Mohlenbrock can be found in the section of the cited book that corresponds to that forest. Additional information about a particular forest can be found in this series and at each forest's website.
- ^{E} The Lake Tahoe Basin Management Unit (LTBMU) consists of 154,830 acres (62,660 ha) of U.S. Forest Service land in the Lake Tahoe watershed. The LTBMU was formed from existing Forest Service land that was managed by Eldorado, Tahoe, and Humboldt–Toiyabe National Forests. Only 767 acres (310 ha) of land in LTBMU is officially designated as LTBMU, and the remainder of the land is still officially designated as the three sources national forests. However, all of this land is managed separately as LTBMU, essentially making it a separate national forest.
