= List of National Natural Landmarks in Mississippi =

There are 5 National Natural Landmarks in Mississippi.

Mississippi National Natural Landmarks (clickable map)

Name	Image	Date	Location	County	Ownership	Description
Bienville Pines Scenic Area		1976	32.349151°N 89.470470°W	Scott	federal	One of the largest protected old-growth loblolly pine stands in the region. Part of Bienville National Forest.
Chestnut Oak Disjunct		1966		Calhoun	private	An isolated stand of chestnut oak.
Green Ash-Overcup Oak-Sweetgum Research Natural Areas		1976	32.766667°N 90.783333°W	Sharkey	federal	Three small parts of the Delta National Forest contain rare pristine tracts of bottomland hardwood trees.
Harrell Prairie Hill		1976	32.335833°N 89.439722°W	Scott	federal	The most representative remnants of the Jackson Prairie. Part of Bienville National Forest.
Mississippi Petrified Forest		1965	32.52073°N 90.32296°W	Madison	private	A relatively undisturbed accumulation of ancient fir and maple driftwood that was buried in Tertiary sands.

== See also ==
- List of National Historic Landmarks in Mississippi
