= Noxon, Montana =

- CDP
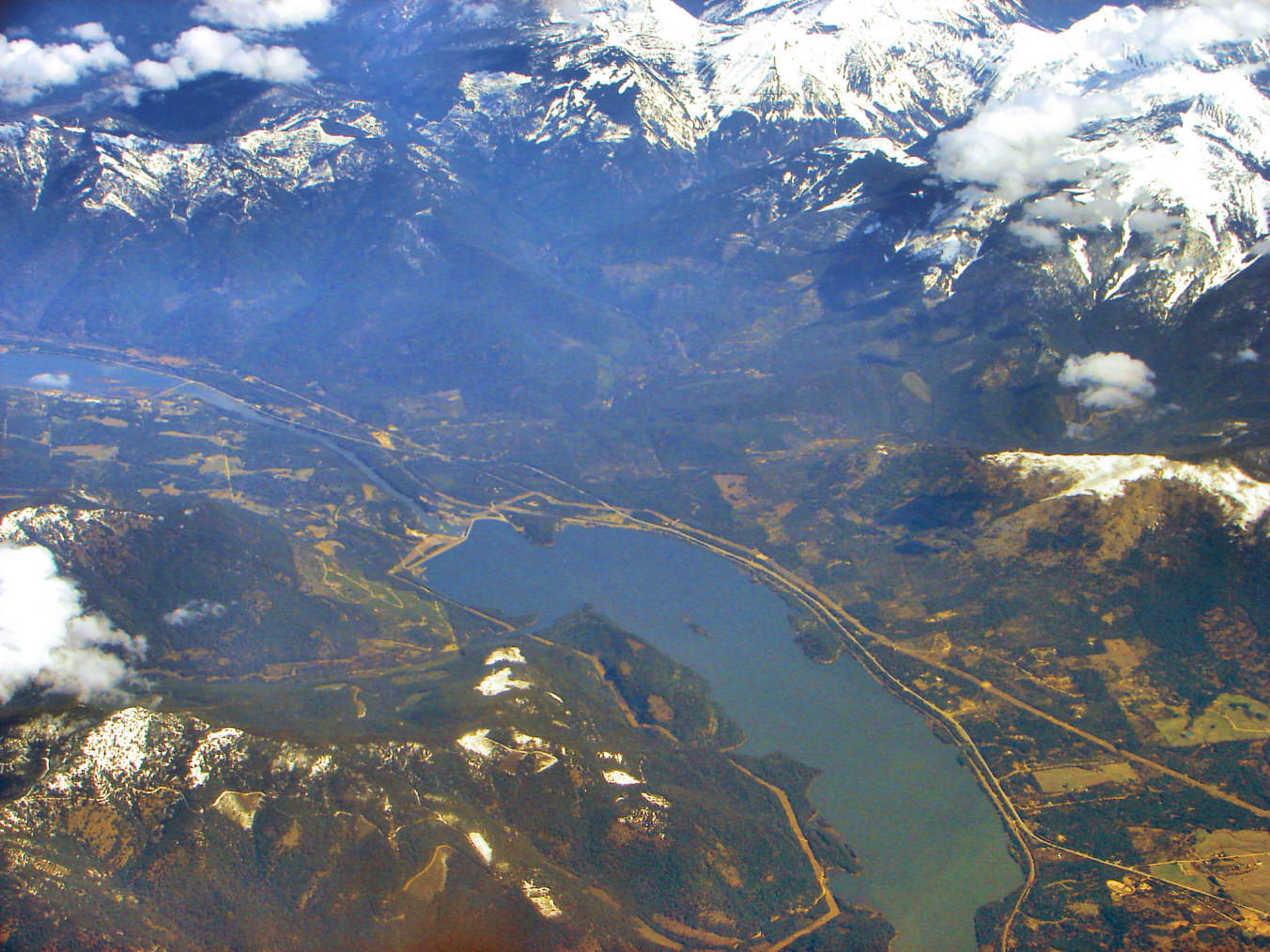
- Aerial view of Noxon, with Noxon Reservoir to the south

- Location of Noxon, Montana
- Coordinates: 47°59′34″N 115°46′23″W
- Country: United States
- State: Montana
- County: Sanders
- Founded: 1883

Area
  - Total: 1.24 sq mi (3.20 km^{2})
  - Land: 1.24 sq mi (3.20 km^{2})
  - Water: 0 sq mi (0.00 km^{2})
- Elevation: 2,185 ft (666 m)

Population (2020)
  - Total: 255
  - Density: 206.1/sq mi (79.56/km^{2})
- Time zone: UTC-7 (Mountain (MST))
  - Summer (DST): UTC-6 (MDT)
- ZIP code: 59853
- Area code: 406
- FIPS code: 30-54925
- GNIS feature ID: 0788328

Noxon is a census-designated place (CDP) in Sanders County, Montana, United States. Its population was 255 in 2020.

The town was established in 1883 as a Northern Pacific Railroad station.

Noxon was a part of Missoula County until 1906, when it became a part of Sanders County.

On February 27, 2024, a fire destroyed three local businesses, a restaurant, cafe, and a grocer. These buildings were three of only four downtown businesses. The cause of the fire was undetermined.

In July 2024 the Noxon Bridge was closed due to structural damage. The temporary grocery store had to be closed because it could not receive supplies. The over 100 year old bridge closed for one week but continued to need replaced. In February 2026 about half of the estimated $35 to $37 million replacement cost was set aside using county, state and federal funds.

== Geography ==
Noxon has an area of 1.3 square miles (3.4 km^{2}), all land. It is on the Clark Fork River in a heavily forested area. The area is known for huckleberry harvesting.

Nearby is the Noxon Rapids Dam which forms the Noxon Rapids Reservoir. Fish species include trout, bass, and northern pike.

=== Climate ===
This climatic region is typified by large seasonal temperature differences, with warm to hot (and often humid) summers and cold (sometimes severely cold) winters, though mild for Montana. The climate is similar to nearby Trout Creek.

== Demographics ==
Historical population
Census	Pop.	Note	%±
2010	218		—
2020	255		17.0%
U.S. Decennial Census

As of the census of 2010, there were 218 people, 127 households, and 66 families residing in the CDP. The population density was 183.2 inhabitants per square mile (70.7/km^{2}). There were 121 housing units at an average density of 96.4 per square mile (37.2/km^{2}). The racial makeup of the CDP was 97.39% White, 0.43% Native American (1 person), and 2.17% from two or more races. Hispanic or Latino of any race were 0.43% of the population (1 person).

There were 104 households, of which 25.0% had children under the age of 18 living with them, 54.8% were married couples living together, 5.8% had a female householder with no husband present, and 35.6% were non-families. 32.7% of all households were made up of individuals, and 12.5% had someone living alone who was 65 years of age or older. The average household size was 2.21 and the average family size was 2.82.

Its age distribution is: 23.5% under the age of 18, 3.5% from 18 to 24, 22.6% from 25 to 44, 37.0% from 45 to 64, and 13.5% who were 65 years of age or older. The median age was 46 years. For every 100 females, there were 93.3 males. For every 100 females age 18 and over, there were 89.2 males.

The median income for a household was $30,583, and the median income for a family was $35,156. Males had a median income of $36,250 versus $21,000 for females. The per capita income was $14,350. About 10.1% of families and 14.7% of the population were below the poverty line, including 20.0% of those under the age of eighteen and 10.5% of those 65 or over.

== Education ==
Noxon Public Schools educates students from kindergarten through 12th grade. Noxon High School's sports team is the Red Devils.

== Media ==
The Sanders County Ledger is a local newspaper. It is printed weekly and also available online.

Noxon is mentioned in the 2025 Netflix movie "Train Dreams" by Clint Bentley.
