= Housetop Mountain =

Mountain in Wyoming, United States

- Location within Wyoming Location within the United States

Highest point
- Elevation: 10,542 ft (3,213 m)
- Coordinates: 43°37′28″N 110°56′51″W

Geography
- Location: Caribou-Targhee National Forest, Teton County, Wyoming, U.S.
- Parent range: Teton Range
- Topo map: USGS Rendezvous Peak

Housetop Mountain (10,542 feet (3,213 m) is located in the Teton Range, Caribou-Targhee National Forest in the U.S. state of Wyoming.
