= Trypophloeus striatulus =

Scientific classification
- Kingdom: Animalia
- Phylum: Arthropoda
- Clade: Pancrustacea
- Class: Insecta
- Order: Coleoptera
- Suborder: Polyphaga
- Infraorder: Cucujiformia
- Family: Curculionidae
- Genus: Trypophloeus
- Species: T. striatulus

Binomial name
- Trypophloeus striatulus (Mannerheim, 1853)

Species of beetle

Trypophloeus striatulus, the willow bark beetle, is a species of typical bark beetle in the family Curculionidae.
