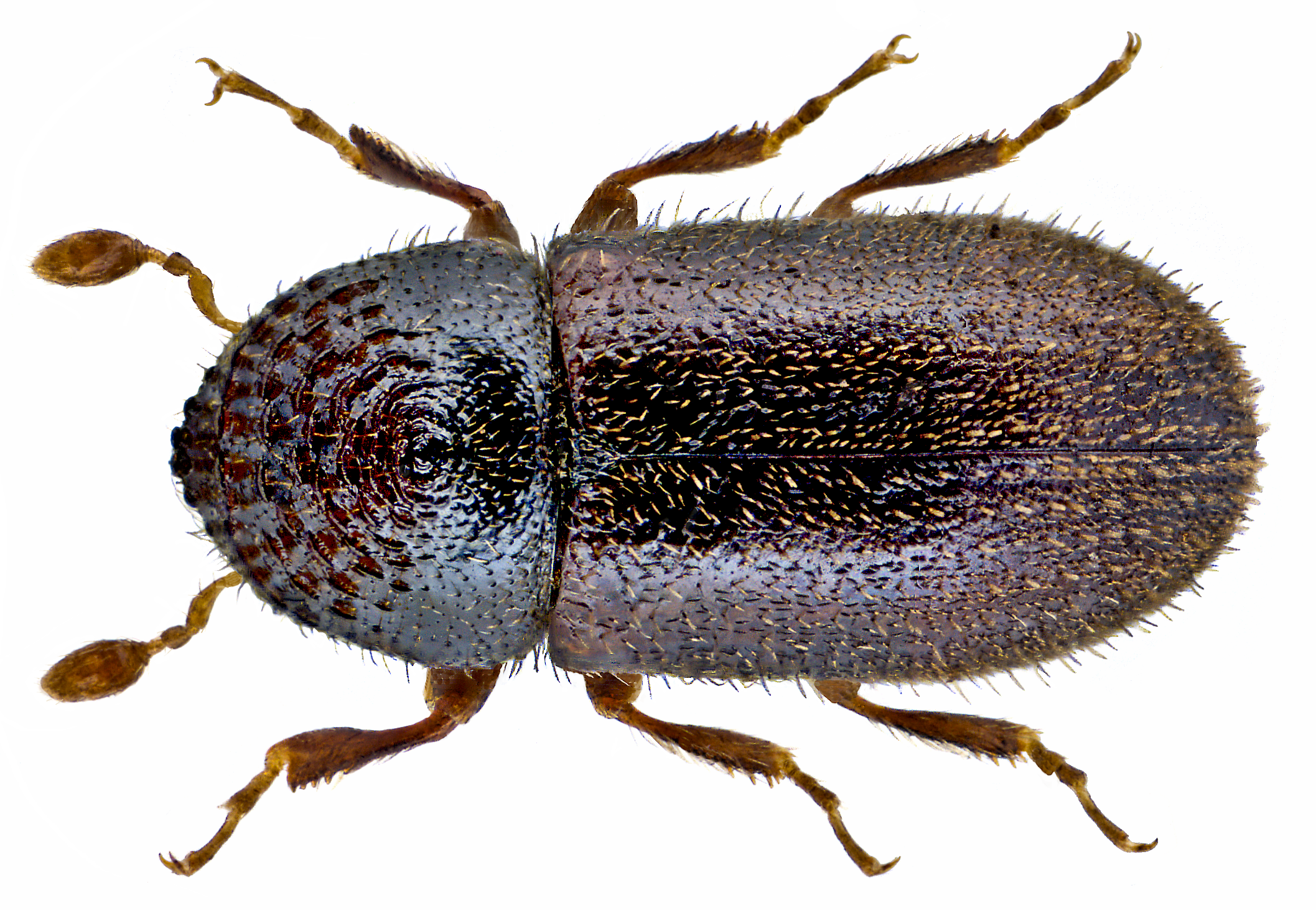
- Trypophloeus binodulus

Scientific classification
- Domain: Eukaryota
- Kingdom: Animalia
- Phylum: Arthropoda
- Class: Insecta
- Order: Coleoptera
- Suborder: Polyphaga
- Infraorder: Cucujiformia
- Family: Curculionidae
- Subtribe: Cryphalina
- Genus: Trypophloeus; Fairmaine, 1868

= Trypophloeus =

Genus of beetles

Tyrpophloeus is a genus of bark beetles. About 12 species comprise the genus, ranging from North America to Europe and Asia. The genus is little-known, but T. populi has recently become important as the causative agent of sudden aspen decline.

Other species' host are mainly poplars, willows and alders.

== Partial species list ==
- Trypophloeus alni
- Trypophloeus asperatus
- Trypophloeus bispinulus
- Trypophloeus discedens
- Trypophloeus klimeschi
- Trypophloeus nitidus Swaine, 1912
- Trypophloeus populi Hopkins, 1915
- Trypophloeus striatulus (also known as the willow bark beetle) Mannerheim, 1853
- Trypophloeus thatcheri
