= Bienville National Forest =

National Forest in Mississippi

- Map of Bienville National Forest

- Location within the United States
- Location: Scott, Smith, Jasper, and Newton counties, Mississippi, United States
- Nearest city: Jackson, MS
- Coordinates: 32.294°N 89.503°W
- Area: 178,541 acres (722.53 km^{2})
- Established: June 15, 1936
- Governing body: U.S. Forest Service
- Website: Bienville National Forest

Bienville National Forest is a United States National Forest in central Mississippi, named for Jean-Baptiste Le Moyne de Bienville. It lies in parts of Scott, Smith, Jasper, and Newton counties and has an area of 178,541 acres (72,253 ha). The forest is headquartered in Jackson, as well as all six National Forests in Mississippi, with local ranger district offices located in Forest, Mississippi.

The forest lies within the Southeastern mixed forests ecoregion and supports mixed forests of pine and oak.

The upper courses of the Leaf and Strong Rivers flow through the forest. Recreational opportunities include camping, hiking, boating and fishing for species such as Bass, Bream, and Crappie, on Marathon Lake and Shongelo Lake.

There are three Wildlife Management Areas (WMA) within Bienville National Forest: Bienville WMA; Tallahalla WMA; and Caney Creek WMA. Each of these areas feature wildlife such as white-tailed deer, and wild turkey. Recent years have seen an influx of invasive wild pigs.

Two National Natural Landmarks are located in Bienville National Forest. The Harrell Prairie Botanical Area is one of the last remaining examples of Jackson Prairie in Mississippi. The Bienville Pines Scenic Area contains one of the largest old-growth stands of loblolly pine in the region. Both areas were designated National Natural Landmarks in 1976.

== See also ==
- List of national forests of the United States
