= The Origins of the National Forests =

1992 book

- Editor: Harold K. Steen
- Subject: Forest conservation, environmental history, National forests of the United States
- Publisher: Forest History Society
- Publication date: 1992
- Publication place: Durham, North Carolina
- Pages: 334
- ISBN: 978-0-8223-1252-9
- Website: Official Site

The Origins of the National Forests: A Centennial Symposium is a 1992 book edited by Harold K. Steen.

== Publication ==
The book was edited by Harold K. Steen, during his tenure as the executive director of Forest History Society.

The book was published by the Forest History Society in 1992.

== Synopsis ==
The book contains 21 essays, based on papers presented at a conference organized by the U.S. Forest Service in Missoula, Montana in 1991. The conference marked 100 years since the passing of the legislation that authorized the creation of the United States National Forests.

It has a forward by Robert Hendricks. Chapter authors include Richard White, Patricia Limerick, Donn E. Headley, Donald Pisani, William Rowley, Char Miller, and R. Peter Gillis.

Richard White's chapter describes how the creation of the National Forests reserves in the United States benefited some people and dispossessed Native Americans.

Donald Pisani wrote about the conservation work of John Wesley Powell, describing his forestry protection efforts as unscientific.

R. Peter Gillis' essay compares American approaches to forestry with those in Canada.

James Muhn's essay examines the management of forest reserves by the General Land Office before they were managed by the U. S. Forest Service.

Ron Arnold's essay includes commentary on legislation proposed by Indiana Congressman William Holman.

Stanley Dempsey's essay Cautious Support: Relations between the Mining Industry and the Forest Service, 1891-1897 included commentary on the role of the mining industry and the charcoal industry and how they advanced forestry conservation.

== Critical reception ==
Thomas Cox, writing in the Western Historical Quarterly, described the essays are varying in quality. A. S. Mather, writing in Forestry: An International Journal of Forest Research similarly criticized the uneven quality of the contributions.
