= Caribou–Targhee National Forest =

Protected area in the U.S. states of Wyoming, Idaho, and Utah

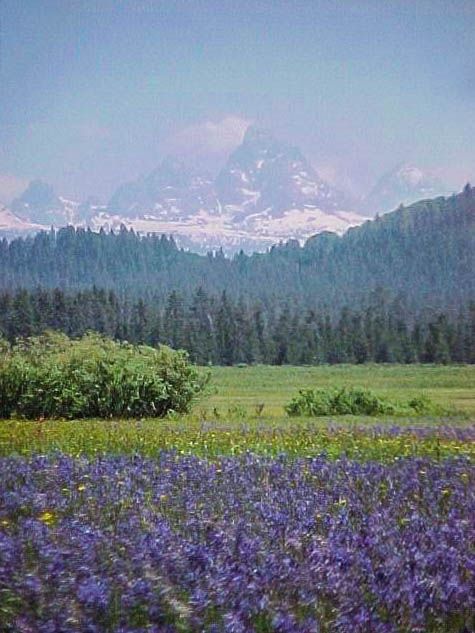
- Camas flowers and the west vista of the Teton Range from Caribou–Targhee National Forest

- Location within the United States
- Location: Idaho, Wyoming, and Utah, United States
- Nearest city: Idaho Falls, ID
- Coordinates: 42°47′0″N 111°33′0″W
- Area: 2,630,716 acres (10,646.13 km^{2})
- Established: 1903
- Governing body: U.S. Forest Service
- Website: Caribou–Targhee National Forest

Caribou–Targhee National Forest is located in the states of Idaho and Wyoming, with a small section in Utah in the United States. The forest is broken into several separate sections and extends over 2.63 million acres (10,600 km^{2}). To the east the forest borders Yellowstone National Park, Grand Teton National Park and Bridger–Teton National Forest. Most of the forest is a part of the 20-million-acre (81,000 km^{2}) Greater Yellowstone Ecosystem.

== Description ==
Caribou and Targhee National Forests were combined from original forest lands created in 1891. Two designated wilderness areas are located in the easternmost sections of the forest, bordering on National Park lands. The 123,451-acre (500 km^{2}) Jedediah Smith Wilderness is adjacent to Grand Teton National Park on the western slope of the Teton Range. Known for karst limestone formations, the wilderness has many caves and provides excellent views of the less often seen west face of the Teton peaks. The smaller 10,715-acre (43 km^{2}) Winegar Hole Wilderness borders Yellowstone National Park and the John D. Rockefeller, Jr. Memorial Parkway, and was set aside primarily to protect prime grizzly bear habitat.

While western sections of the forest have a mixture of sagebrush and grasses, the higher elevations in the east support lodgepole pine, and numerous species of spruce and fir. In addition to grizzlies most of the major megafauna associated with Yellowstone National Park can be found in Caribou–Targhee National Forest. Mammalian species of black bear, wolf, elk, moose, mule deer, bison, cougar, and pronghorn have all been seen by visitors on forest lands. An active peregrine falcon recovery program was begun to return this bird species to some of their ancestral range. Cutthroat trout, brook trout and pike are found in the streams and lakes and the forest is considered one of the best fishing areas in the world for cutthroat trout.

Minnetonka Cave is one of only two caves administered by the U.S. Forest Service

Dozens of campgrounds and 1,600 miles (2,500 km) of trails allow access to much of the forest. There are two trails that access the high altitude Alaska Basin immediately west of the main Teton Range peaks and allow access to trails in Grand Teton National Park.

Caribou National Forest, the smaller and more southerly of the two, is located in southeastern Idaho, western Wyoming, and northern Utah, and has a total area of 987,221 acres (3,995 km^{2}). There are local ranger district offices located in Montpelier, Pocatello, and Soda Springs in Idaho.

The larger and more northerly Targhee National Forest is located in eastern Idaho and northwestern Wyoming, and has an area of 1,643,501 acres (6,651 km^{2}). There are local ranger district offices located in Ashton, Driggs, Dubois, Idaho Falls and Island Park in Idaho. In Island Park is Big Springs, a first-magnitude spring that is the source of the South Fork of Henrys Fork.

Connecting fragmented habitats through ecological corridors is widely recognized by conservation biologists as a key strategy for restoring native wildlife communities. Many such corridors have been identified where wildlife conservation is a concern. The montane nature of the Caribou National Forest make it an important link between the northern and southern Rocky Mountains. If restoration of native species is to be achieved throughout the American West, the Caribou will play an important role.

The combined Caribou–Targhee National Forest is managed by the Forest Service from offices in Idaho Falls, Idaho.

== Wilderness areas ==
There are two officially designated wilderness areas within the Caribou–Targhee National Forest that are part of the National Wilderness Preservation System. Both lie just south of Yellowstone National Park, in the Targhee National Forest section.

- Jedediah Smith Wilderness
- Winegar Hole Wilderness

== Counties ==
Counties are listed in descending order of forestland area, by forest.

=== Caribou National Forest ===
- Caribou County, Idaho
- Bonneville County, Idaho
- Bannock County, Idaho
- Bear Lake County, Idaho
- Oneida County, Idaho
- Franklin County, Idaho
- Lincoln County, Wyoming
- Power County, Idaho
- Box Elder County, Utah
- Cache County, Utah

=== Targhee National Forest ===
Upper Mesa Falls, Fremont County, Targhee National Forest

- Fremont County, Idaho
- Clark County, Idaho
- Teton County, Wyoming
- Bonneville County, Idaho
- Teton County, Idaho
- Lemhi County, Idaho
- Lincoln County, Wyoming
- Butte County, Idaho
- Madison County, Idaho
- Jefferson County, Idaho

== Gallery ==
Caribou–Targhee
Whitebark pine

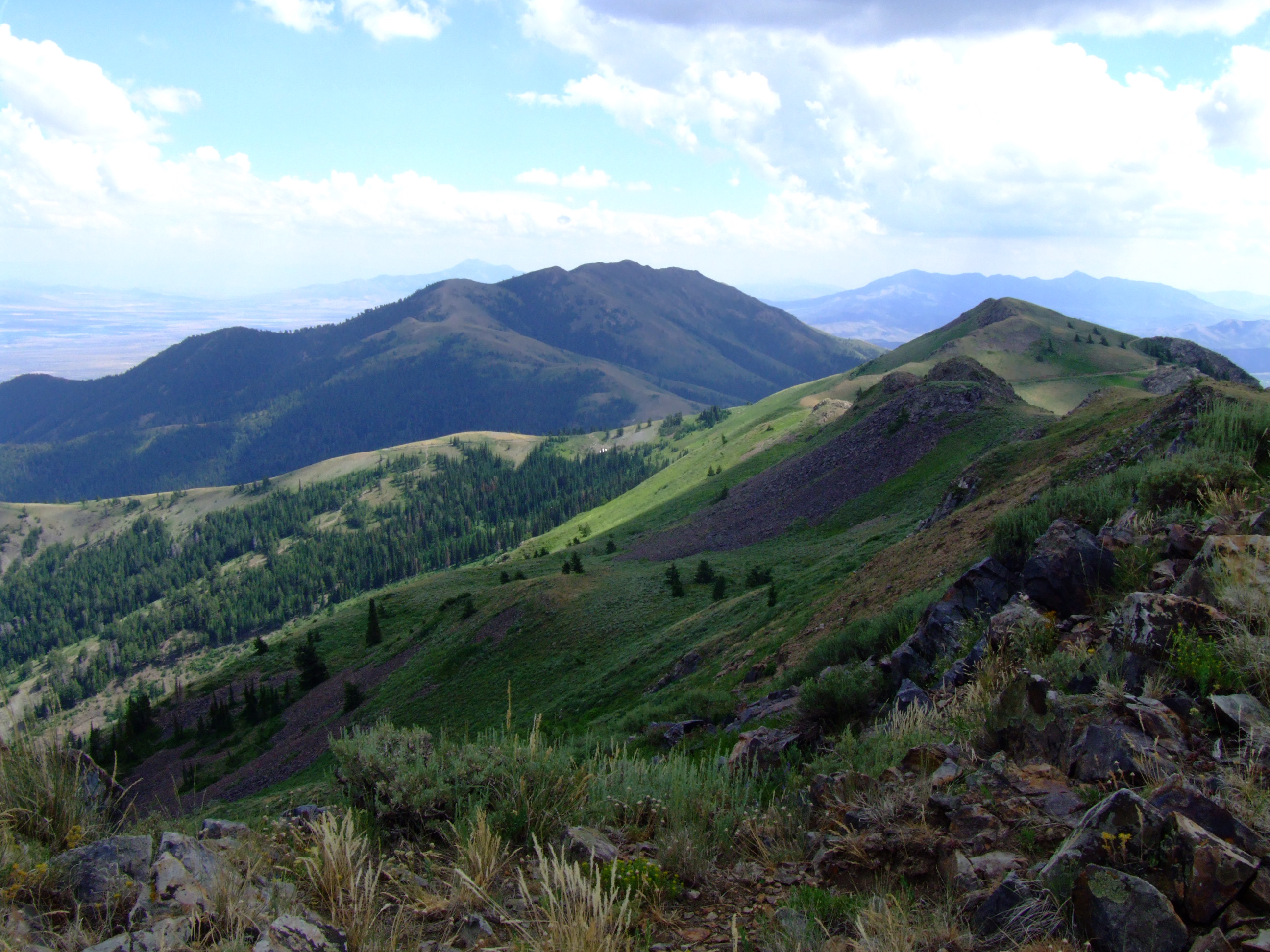
Scout Mountain to Old Tom Mountain

Old windmill at Curlew grasslands

Sage grouse in snow

Smoky Canyon mine area

Sawtell Road wildflowers

Forest products

== See also ==
- List of national forests of the United States
