= Trout Creek, Montana =

- CDP
- Nickname: "Huckleberry Capital of Montana"
- Location of Trout Creek, Montana
- Coordinates: 47°49′51″N 115°35′39″W
- Country: United States
- State: Montana
- County: Sanders
- Founded: 1883

Area
  - Total: 2.63 sq mi (6.81 km^{2})
  - Land: 1.84 sq mi (4.77 km^{2})
  - Water: 0.79 sq mi (2.04 km^{2})
- Elevation: 2,366 ft (721 m)

Population (2020)
  - Total: 277
  - Density: 150.3/sq mi (58.02/km^{2})
- Time zone: UTC-7 (Mountain (MST))
  - Summer (DST): UTC-6 (MDT)
- ZIP code: 59874
- Area code: 406
- FIPS code: 30-74950
- GNIS feature ID: 0792392

Trout Creek is a census-designated place (CDP) in Sanders County, Montana, United States. The population was 261 at the 2000 census. Population increased to 277 per the United States Census [2020] Trout Creek was proclaimed "Huckleberry Capital of Montana" by the state's legislature in 1981.

The post office opened in 1885. In 1910, the townsite was moved downstream to the opposite side of the creek. The town experienced an economic boost with construction of the Noxon Rapids Dam (1955–56).

Trout Creek was part of Missoula County until 1906, when it became part of Sanders County.

== Geography ==
Trout Creek is located at 47°49′51″N 115°35′39″W (47.830737, -115.594221).

According to the United States Census Bureau, the CDP has a total area of 1.9 square miles (4.9 km^{2}), all land.

=== Climate ===
Trout Creek experiences large seasonal temperature differences, with warm to hot (and often humid) summers and cold (sometimes extremely cold) winters. According to the Köppen Climate Classification system, Trout Creek has a warm-summer mediterranean continental climate, abbreviated "Dsb" on climate maps. The hottest temperature recorded in Trout Creek was 110 °F (43.3 °C) on August 4, 1961, while the coldest temperature recorded was −40 °F (−40.0 °C) on December 30, 1968.

Climate data for Trout Creek, Montana, 1991–2020 normals, extremes 1960–2022
Month	Jan	Feb	Mar	Apr	May	Jun	Jul	Aug	Sep	Oct	Nov	Dec	Year
Record high °F (°C)	57 (14)	69 (21)	77 (25)	92 (33)	98 (37)	102 (39)	105 (41)	110 (43)	101 (38)	89 (32)	69 (21)	55 (13)	110 (43)
Mean maximum °F (°C)	45.8 (7.7)	52.5 (11.4)	65.5 (18.6)	78.0 (25.6)	87.2 (30.7)	91.3 (32.9)	97.7 (36.5)	97.4 (36.3)	90.1 (32.3)	76.0 (24.4)	55.5 (13.1)	43.5 (6.4)	99.3 (37.4)
Mean daily maximum °F (°C)	33.6 (0.9)	39.1 (3.9)	48.4 (9.1)	57.9 (14.4)	68.1 (20.1)	74.1 (23.4)	84.9 (29.4)	84.7 (29.3)	74.2 (23.4)	57.7 (14.3)	40.9 (4.9)	33.0 (0.6)	58.1 (14.5)
Daily mean °F (°C)	28.0 (−2.2)	30.8 (−0.7)	38.0 (3.3)	45.0 (7.2)	53.6 (12.0)	59.5 (15.3)	66.8 (19.3)	65.7 (18.7)	57.6 (14.2)	46.1 (7.8)	34.7 (1.5)	27.6 (−2.4)	46.1 (7.8)
Mean daily minimum °F (°C)	22.4 (−5.3)	22.5 (−5.3)	27.7 (−2.4)	32.1 (0.1)	39.1 (3.9)	44.9 (7.2)	48.7 (9.3)	46.6 (8.1)	41.0 (5.0)	34.6 (1.4)	28.5 (−1.9)	22.3 (−5.4)	34.2 (1.2)
Mean minimum °F (°C)	−1.2 (−18.4)	1.0 (−17.2)	13.7 (−10.2)	22.4 (−5.3)	26.4 (−3.1)	32.9 (0.5)	37.4 (3.0)	36.0 (2.2)	28.6 (−1.9)	20.3 (−6.5)	12.3 (−10.9)	1.2 (−17.1)	−10.8 (−23.8)
Record low °F (°C)	−33 (−36)	−23 (−31)	−11 (−24)	9 (−13)	18 (−8)	27 (−3)	27 (−3)	26 (−3)	18 (−8)	5 (−15)	−8 (−22)	−40 (−40)	−40 (−40)
Average precipitation inches (mm)	3.20 (81)	2.34 (59)	1.93 (49)	1.75 (44)	2.06 (52)	2.42 (61)	0.90 (23)	0.86 (22)	1.32 (34)	2.86 (73)	3.46 (88)	3.72 (94)	26.82 (680)
Average snowfall inches (cm)	18.2 (46)	6.4 (16)	3.7 (9.4)	0.3 (0.76)	0.0 (0.0)	0.0 (0.0)	0.0 (0.0)	0.0 (0.0)	0.0 (0.0)	0.0 (0.0)	5.8 (15)	17.0 (43)	51.4 (130.16)
Average extreme snow depth inches (cm)	15.0 (38)	9.4 (24)	4.8 (12)	0.3 (0.76)	0.0 (0.0)	0.0 (0.0)	0.0 (0.0)	0.0 (0.0)	0.0 (0.0)	0.0 (0.0)	3.9 (9.9)	10.9 (28)	16.2 (41)
Average precipitation days (≥ 0.01 in)	15.4	10.9	12.2	11.7	11.1	11.0	5.2	4.9	6.4	10.5	14.4	15.6	129.3
Average snowy days (≥ 0.1 in)	6.1	2.9	1.5	0.1	0.0	0.0	0.0	0.0	0.0	0.0	2.4	5.6	18.6
Source 1: NOAA
Source 2: National Weather Service (mean maxima/minima, snow depth 1981–2010)

== Demographics ==
Historical population
Census	Pop.	Note	%±
2020	277		—
U.S. Decennial Census

As of the census of 2000, there were 261 people, 109 households, and 72 families residing in the CDP. The population density was 139.9 inhabitants per square mile (54.0/km^{2}). There were 135 housing units at an average density of 72.4 per square mile (28.0/km^{2}). The racial makeup of the CDP was 93.87% White, 1.92% Native American, and 4.21% from two or more races. Hispanic or Latino of any race were 1.92% of the population.

There were 109 households, out of which 27.5% had children under the age of 18 living with them, 53.2% were married couples living together, 8.3% had a female householder with no husband present, and 33.9% were non-families. 29.4% of all households were made up of individuals, and 7.3% had someone living alone who was 65 years of age or older. The average household size was 2.39 and the average family size was 2.92.

In the CDP, the population was spread out, with 26.1% under the age of 18, 6.5% from 18 to 24, 24.5% from 25 to 44, 32.2% from 45 to 64, and 10.7% who were 65 years of age or older. The median age was 40 years. For every 100 females, there were 117.5 males. For every 100 females age 18 and over, there were 112.1 males.

The median income for a household in the CDP was $26,458, and the median income for a family was $28,958. Males had a median income of $25,357 versus $12,083 for females. The per capita income for the CDP was $15,910. About 17.5% of families and 21.1% of the population were below the poverty line, including 42.5% of those under the age of eighteen and none of those 65 or over.

== Culture and events ==
Trout Creek has been designated by the legislature as the "huckleberry capital" of Montana and hosts the annual Huckleberry Festival each August. The festival is a three-day bazaar with a parade, pie eating contest, talent show, 5K fun run, and other activities, including vendors selling huckleberry-based products.

The Cabinet Mountains Wilderness and Cabinet Gorge provide recreational areas for camping, hiking, hunting, and fishing. The Vermillion and Graves Creek falls are also nearby. Trout Creek itself is located on the banks of Noxon Rapids Reservoir. The reservoir is a 33-mile impoundment of the Clark Fork River, stretching from Thompson Falls to Noxon. It is known for its bass and pike fishing.

The second Saturday in February there is an annual "Snowmobile Poker Run" starting and ending in Trout Creek.

The second week in June there is an annual ATV Rally starting and ending in Trout Creek. It is typically a two-day event with a short ride the first day. The second day features a poker run and hog roast or BBQ.

There is also a weekly farmers market starting each summer after July 4.
