= Winegar Hole Wilderness =

Wilderness area in Wyoming, United States

- IUCN category Ib (wilderness area)
- Location within the United States
- Location: Teton County, Wyoming, United States
- Nearest city: Ashton, Idaho
- Coordinates: 44°07′N 111°00′W
- Area: 10,715 acres (43.36 km^{2})
- Established: 1984
- Governing body: U.S. Forest Service

The Winegar Hole Wilderness is located in the U.S. state of Wyoming. Designated wilderness by Congress in 1984, the wilderness is within Caribou-Targhee National Forest and borders Yellowstone National Park. The wilderness was created to further protect what is considered to be prime grizzly bear habitat. The wilderness is an integral part of the Greater Yellowstone Ecosystem.

U.S. Wilderness Areas do not allow motorized or mechanized vehicles, including bicycles. Although camping and fishing are allowed with proper permit, no roads or buildings are constructed and there is also no logging or mining, in compliance with the 1964 Wilderness Act. Wilderness areas within National Forests and Bureau of Land Management areas also allow hunting in season.

The Winegar Hole is between Yellowstone National Park and Grand Teton National Park, along the Wyoming / Idaho border. The Fremont County (Idaho) history says: "The same Egin Bench was the first settlement when Stephen Winegar and his four sons, George, Willis, Leonard and John, put up the first log shelter during the summer of 1879 when they cut and stacked the wild hay in the river bottoms. Winegar Hole and "Gideon Winegar June, 1882", carved on the cliff beside the Snake River, are reminders of these early settlers."
