= Cabinet Gorge Dam =

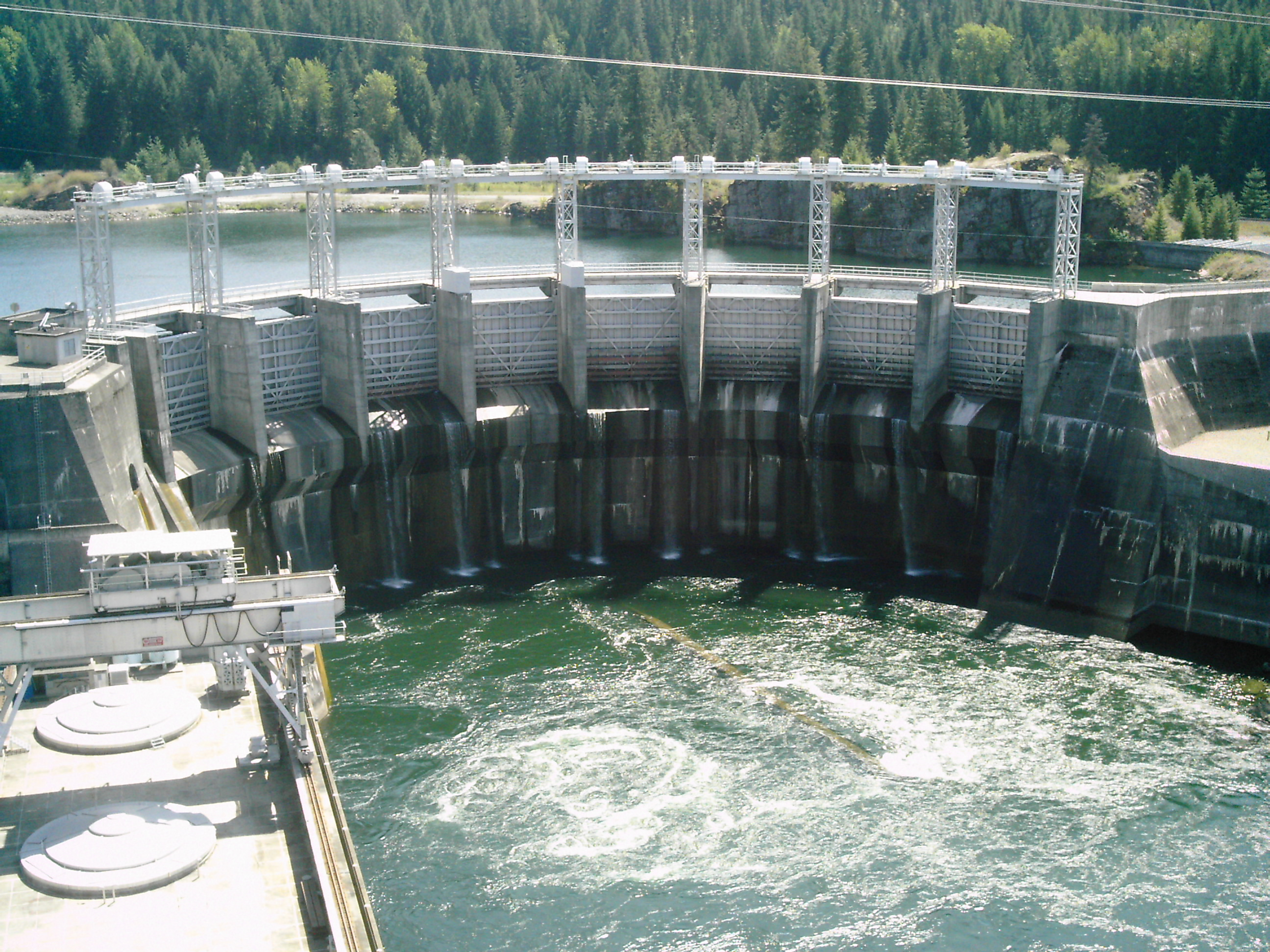
- circa 2007

- Location in the United States Location in Idaho
- Location: Bonner County, Idaho, U.S.
- Coordinates: 48°5′12″N 116°3′52″W
- Construction began: April 1951
- Opening date: 1952; 74 years ago
- Construction cost: $47 million
- Operator: Avista Corp.

Dam and spillways
- Impounds: Clark Fork River
- Height: 208 feet (63 m)
- Length: 600 feet (183 m)
- Width (base): 40 feet (12 m)

Reservoir
- Creates: Cabinet Gorge Reservoir
- Catchment area: 22,000 square miles (57,000 km^{2})
- Surface area: 3,200 acres (12.9 km^{2})
- Normal elevation: 2,175 feet (663 m)

Power Station
- Turbines: 4 turbines; 1 Kaplan, 1 mixed flow, 2 propellers
- Installed capacity: 230 mw

Cabinet Gorge Dam is a concrete gravity-arch hydroelectric dam in the northwest United States, on the Clark Fork River in northern Idaho. The dam is located just west of the Montana border, near the approximate location of the ancient ice dams that impounded Glacial Lake Missoula. The Cabinet Gorge Reservoir extends into Montana, nearly to Noxon Rapids Dam. The purpose of the dam is for hydroelectricity.

== Construction ==
Construction began in 1951 by the Morrison–Knudsen Corporation, with groundbreaking ceremonies on April 1.

The Clark Fork River had to be diverted with two coffer dams and speed was necessary because spring flooding threatened the river diversion and coffer dam integrity. Thirty-two tons of dynamite was used to blast 50,000 cubic yards (38,000 m^{3}) of rock from the canyon walls in order to prep the construction site. Water was diverted through two 1,000-foot (300 m) tunnels, and a 500,000 cubic yards (380,000 m^{3}) of earth was excavated from the site overall. Construction on the dam was completed in 1952 in half the estimated time.

The dam is currently owned and operated by the power company Avista, formerly Washington Water Power.

On August 13, 2017, a train derailment dumped more than 3,500 tons of coal on the Cabinet Gorge Reservoir riverbank between Noxon and Heron, Montana.

== See also ==
- List of dams in the Columbia River watershed
