= Watson Falls =

Coordinates: 43.241511°N 122.390040°W

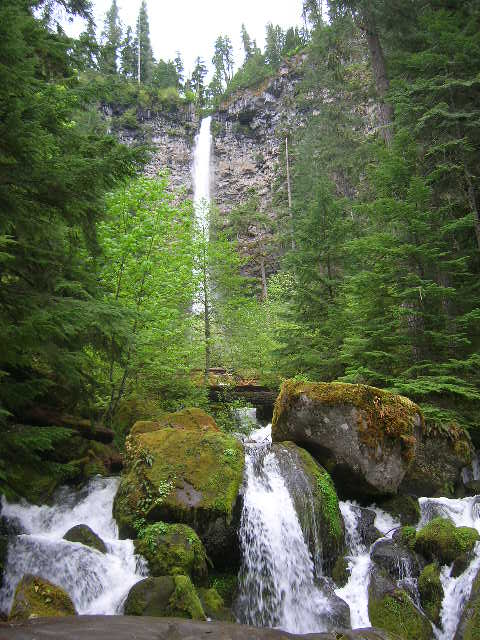
- Watson Falls
- Interactive map of Watson Falls
- Location: North Umpqua River
- Type: Plunge
- Elevation: 3,214 ft (980 m)
- Total height: 293 ft (89 m)

Watson Falls is a 272-foot (83 m) waterfall on Watson Creek, a tributary of the Clearwater River, in Douglas County in the U.S. state of Oregon. It is located at an elevation of 3,353 feet (1,022 m).

== See also ==
- List of waterfalls
- List of waterfalls in Oregon
