= Delta National Forest =

U.S. National Forest in Mississippi

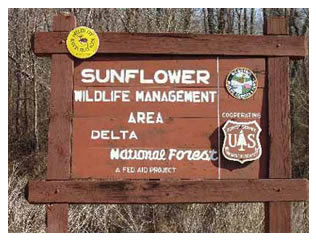

- Location within the United States
- Location: Mississippi, United States
- Nearest city: Vicksburg, MS
- Coordinates: 32°46′N 90°47′W
- Area: 60,898 acres (246.45 km^{2})
- Established: January 12, 1961
- Governing body: U.S. Forest Service
- Website: National Forests in Mississippi

Delta National Forest is a U.S. National Forest in western Mississippi, located in Sharkey County, and has an area of 60,898 acres (246.4 km^{2}). Delta is operated as the Sunflower Wildlife Management Area. The forest is headquartered in Jackson, as are all six National Forests in Mississippi, but Delta Ranger District office is located in Rolling Fork. It is one of only six National Forests that are contained entirely within a single county and the only bottomland hardwood forest in the National Forest system.

The Green Ash-Overcup Oak-Sweetgum Research Natural Areas within the Delta National Forest are a rare example of pristine bottomland hardwood forests. They were declared National Natural Landmarks in May 1976.

== Sunflower Wildlife Management Area ==
Under a Memorandum of Understanding between the US forest Service and the Mississippi Department of Wildlife, Fisheries and Parks Delta National Forest is operated as the Sunflower Wildlife Management Area.

== See also ==
- List of national forests of the United States
