= Greater Yellowstone Ecosystem =

Ecosystem in the Rocky Mountains

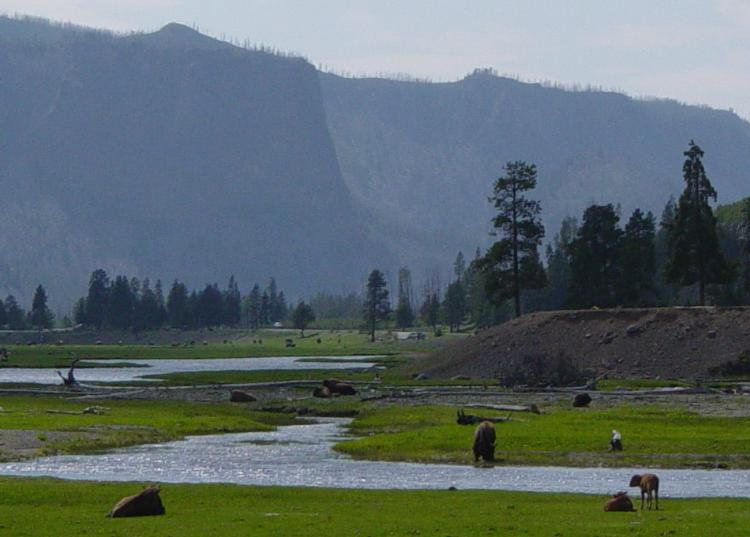
Bison grazing near Gibbon River at Madison in Yellowstone National Park.

The Greater Yellowstone Ecosystem (GYE) is one of the last remaining large, nearly intact ecosystems in the northern temperate climate zone. It is located within the central Rocky Mountains, in areas of northwestern Wyoming, southwestern Montana, and eastern Idaho, and is about 22 million acres (89,000 km^{2}). Yellowstone National Park and the Yellowstone Caldera 'hotspot' are within it.

The area is a flagship site for conservation groups that promote ecosystem management. It is one of the world's foremost natural laboratories in landscape ecology and Holocene geology. It is also home to the diverse native plants and animals of Yellowstone.

== History ==
Grizzly bear range expansion in Greater Yellowstone Ecosystem 1990–2018

Yellowstone National Park boundaries were drawn in 1872 with the intent to include all the known geothermal basins in the region. As landscape ecology considerations were not incorporated into original boundary, revisions were suggested to conform more closely to natural topographic features, such as the ridgeline of the Absaroka Range along the east boundary. In 1929, President Hoover signed the first bill changing the park's boundaries: The northwest corner now included a significant area of petrified trees; the northeast corner was defined by the watershed of Pebble Creek; the eastern boundary included the headwaters of the Lamar River and part of the watershed of the Yellowstone River. In 1932, President Hoover issued an executive order that added more than 7,000 acres (2,800 ha) between the north boundary and the Yellowstone River, west of Gardiner. These lands provided winter range for elk and other ungulates. By the 1970s, the grizzly bear's (Ursus arctos) range in and near the park became the first informal minimum boundary of a theoretical "Greater Yellowstone Ecosystem" that included at least 4,000,000 acres (16,000 km^{2}). Since then, definitions of the greater ecosystem's size have steadily grown larger. A 1994 study listed the size as 19,000,000 acres (76,890 km^{2}), while a 1994 speech by a Greater Yellowstone Coalition leader enlarged that to 20,000,000 acres (80,000 km^{2}).

In 1985, the United States Forest Service managers at Caribou–Targhee National Forest proposed harvesting 860 million board feet of timber over the coming decade, the highest harvest by far in the GYE and an extremely high proportion nationally. While they began cutting immediately, their plan was quickly challenged by a newly created Greater Yellowstone Coalition. Later that year, the United States House of Representatives Subcommittees on Public Lands and National Parks and Recreation held a joint subcommittee hearing on Greater Yellowstone, resulting in a 1986 report by the Congressional Research Service outlining shortcomings in inter-agency coordination and concluding that the area's essential values were at risk. The Congressional inquiry led to the recognition of Greater Yellowstone as a special area requiring collaboration between federal agencies.

In 1989, a Canadian mining company announced plans to open a mine on Forest Service land near Cooke City, Montana, again with the approval of the Forest Service. This was a valid claim under the General Mining Act of 1872, but drew concerned reactions from the Park Service as well as local residents. In 1995, the proposed mine was condemned by the World Heritage Committee, by President Bill Clinton, and by Montana and Wyoming politicians. The United States eventually repurchased the land for $65 million. In 2015, two new mines were proposed, leading to the passage of the Yellowstone Gateway Protection Act in 2019 to prevent all future mining claims in the GYE. Caribou–Targhee National Forest has already hosted many mines and there are over a dozen Superfund sites inside the forest boundaries. Existing mines in the GYE can also be expanded; the East Boulder Mine in Sweet Grass County, Montana received expansion approval in 2024.

== Protected areas ==
Federally managed areas within the GYE include:

- United States National Park Service (NPS) — Yellowstone National Park, Grand Teton National Park, and John D. Rockefeller, Jr. Memorial Parkway.
- United States National Forest Service (USFS) — Gallatin, Custer, Beaverhead-Deerlodge, Caribou-Targhee, Bridger-Teton, and Shoshone National Forests
- United States Fish and Wildlife Service (USFWS) — National Elk Refuge, Red Rock Lakes and Grays Lake National Wildlife Refuges

Ten distinct National Wilderness Areas have been established within the GYE's National Forests since 1966, mandating a higher level of habitat protection than the USFS otherwise uses.

The GYE also encompasses some privately held and state lands surrounding those managed by the U.S. Government.

The Trust for Public Land has protected 67,000 acres (27,000 ha) over about 40 projects in the Greater Yellowstone Ecosystem.

== Animals and plant diversity ==
=== Large mammals ===
The GYE is home to some of North America's most iconic wildlife. The ecosystem supports the largest free-roaming herds of American bison (Bison bison) on public land, a species central to the region's ecological balance. Grizzly bears (Ursus arctos horribilis) and gray wolves (Canis lupus) are apex predators that play crucial roles in regulating prey populations.

Elk (Cervus canadensis) are abundant and form a key component of the ecosystem, providing sustenance for predators. Other significant ungulate species include moose (Alces alces), pronghorn (Antilocapra americana), bighorn sheep (Ovis canadensis), and mountain goats (Oreamnos americanus).

=== Birds ===
The GYE is home to a variety of birds, including iconic species like bald eagles, golden eagles and peregrine falcons. Osprey populations around Yellowstone Lake have experienced declines linked to the decrease in cutthroat trout. Several bird species act as keystone species within the GYE. For example, the Clark's nutcracker plays a crucial role in the dispersal of the all-important whitebark pine seeds.

== Management by species ==
Ecological management has been most often advanced through concerns over individual species rather than over broader ecological principles. Though 20 or 30 or even 50 years of information on a population may be considered long-term by some, one of the important lessons of Greater Yellowstone management is that even half a century is not long enough to give a full idea of how a species may vary in its occupation of a wild ecosystem.

The Yellowstone hot springs are important for their diversity of thermophilic bacteria. These bacteria have been useful in studies of the evolution of photosynthesis and as sources of thermostable enzymes for molecular biology. Although the smell of sulfur is common and there are some sulfur fixing cyanobacteria, it has been found that hydrogen is being used as an energy source by extremophile microbes.

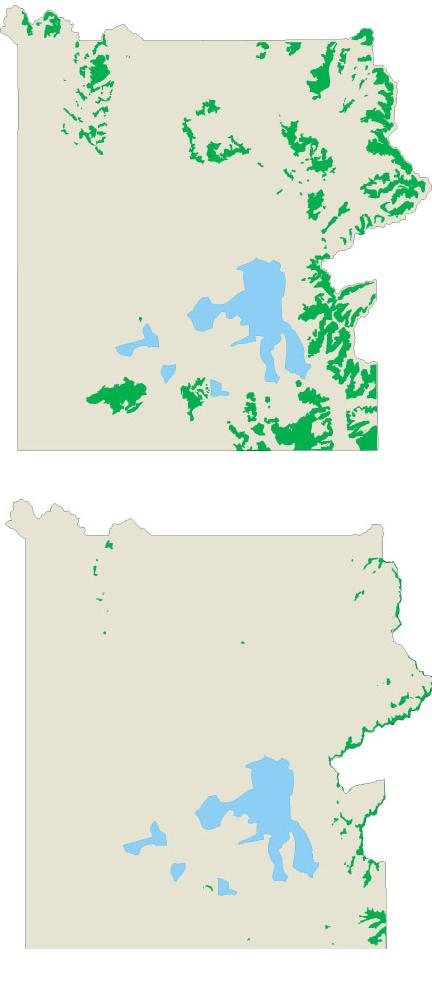
Current (top) and projected (bottom) distribution of whitebark pine (Pinus albicaulis) in Yellowstone National Park.

=== Flora ===
Among native plants of the GYE, whitebark pine (Pinus albicaulis) is a species of special interest, in large part because of its seasonal importance to grizzly bears, but also because its distribution could be dramatically reduced by relatively minor global warming. In this case, researchers do not have a good long-term data set on the species, but they understand its ecology well enough to project declining future conservation status. A more immediate and serious threat to whitebark pines is an introduced fungal rust disease, White Pine Blister Rust (Cronartium ribicola), which is causing heavy mortality in the species. Occasional resistant individuals occur, but in the short to medium term, a severe population decline is expected.

Estimates of the decline of quaking aspen (Populus tremuloides) on the park's northern range since 1872 range from 50% to 95%. The decline has been linked to multiple stressors, such as defoliation by the forest tent caterpillar (Malacosoma disstria), aspen bark beetles (Trypophloeus populi and Procryphalus mucronatus), wood-boring beetles such as the poplar borer (Saperda calcarata) and the bronze poplar borer (Agrilus liragus), fungal disturbances such as those by the Cytospora canker (Valsa sordida), and Climate change related stressors.

=== Fauna ===
Anecdotal information on grizzly bear abundance dates to the mid-19th century, and administrators have made informal population estimates for more than 70 years. From these sources, ecologists know the species was common in Greater Yellowstone when Europeans arrived and that the population was not isolated before the 1930s, but is now. Researchers do not know if bears were more or less common than now.

A 1959-1970 bear study suggested a grizzly bear population size of about 176, later revised to about 229. Later estimates have ranged as low as 136 and as high as 540; the most recent is a minimum estimate of 236, but biologists think there may be as many as 1,000 bears in the ecosystem. Although the Greater Yellowstone population is relatively close to recovery goals, the plan's definition of recovery is controversial. Thus, even though the population may be stable or possibly increasing in the short term, in the longer term, continued habitat loss, climate change, and increasing human activities may well reverse the trend.

Yellowstone cutthroat trout (Oncorhynchus clarki bouvieri) have suffered considerable declines since European settlement, but recently began flourishing in some areas. Especially in Yellowstone Lake itself, long-term records indicate an almost remarkable restoration of robust populations from only three decades ago when the numbers of this fish were depleted because of excessive harvest and invasive lake trout. An aggressive lake trout removal program has caused the cutthroats to rebound. Its current recovery, though a significant management achievement, does not begin to restore the species' historical abundance.

Early accounts of pronghorn (Antilocapra americana) in Greater Yellowstone described herds of hundreds seen ranging through most major river valleys. These populations were decimated by 1900, and declines continued among remaining herds. On the park's northern range, pronghorn declined from around 500-700 in the 1930s to about 122 in 1968. By 1992 the herd had increased to 536.

==== Gray Wolf reintroduction ====
The park is a commonly cited example of apex predators affecting an ecosystem through a trophic cascade. After the reintroduction of the gray wolf in 1995, researchers noticed drastic changes occurring. Elk, the primary prey of the gray wolf, became less abundant and changed their behavior, freeing riparian zones from constant grazing. The respite allowed willows and aspens to grow, creating habitat for beaver, moose, and scores of other species. In addition to the effects on prey species, the gray wolf's presence also affected the park's grizzly bear population. The bears, emerging from hibernation, chose to scavenge off wolf kills to gain needed energy and fatten up after fasting for months. Dozens of other species have been documented scavenging from wolf kills.

== See also ==
- Ecology of the Rocky Mountains
- Ecology of the Rocky Mountains topics
