= Bienville Pines Scenic Area =

Nature preserve in Mississippi, United States

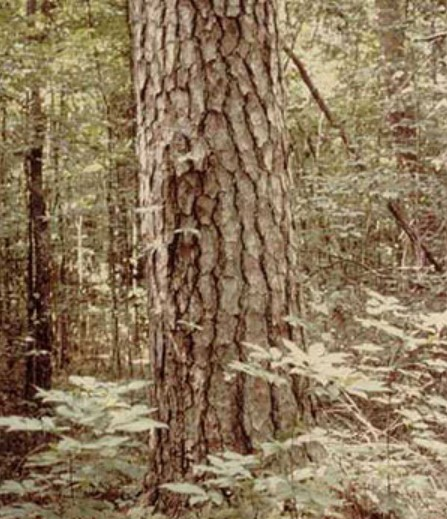
- Old-growth loblolly pine in the Scenic Area

- Location within Mississippi Location within the United States
- Location: Scott County, Mississippi
- Nearest city: Forest
- Coordinates: 32°20′57″N 89°28′13″W
- Area: 223 acres (90 ha)
- Established: 1976

U.S. National Natural Landmark
- Designated: 1976

Bienville Pines Scenic Area is a 223-acre (90 ha) pine forest nature preserve located within Bienville National Forest near Forest, Mississippi. It is one of the largest remaining stands of old-growth loblolly pine in Mississippi. It was declared a National Natural Landmark in May 1976.

== Description ==
The Bienville Pines Scenic Area is located in the Jackson Prairie ecoregion. The land is dominated by Upland Pine Forest (loblolly and shortleaf pine) with an understory consisting of Coastal Plain Upland Hardwood Forest. The larger loblolly pines are over 200 years old. The trees in the area were not logged for lumber despite growing on land owned by a local lumber company and being adjacent to a sawmill.

The majority of trees in the Scenic Area are pine, including loblolly, shortleaf, and longleaf pine. Hardwood trees are interspersed in the pine, including white oak, winged elm, black gum, sweetgum, red maple, and deciduous holly.

Only insect-infested trees that threaten surrounding trees or trees that pose a safety hazard to the Scenic Area's hiking trail are allowed to be felled within the protected area.

The Bienville Pines Scenic Area is an important habitat for the near threatened red-cockaded woodpecker, which needs mature pine trees to build its nesting cavities.

== Visiting ==
There is a small parking lot next to the Scenic Area. A 1.8-mile (2.9 km) trail winds through the Scenic Area and includes numbered posts describing important features.
