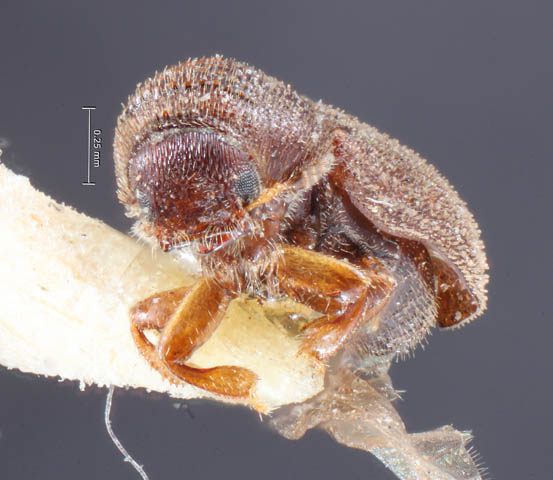
- Trypophloeus populi (by TH Atkinson, Biodiversity Center, University of Texas at Austin). holotype Trypophloeus populi Hopkins.

Scientific classification
- Kingdom: Animalia
- Phylum: Arthropoda
- Clade: Pancrustacea
- Class: Insecta
- Order: Coleoptera
- Suborder: Polyphaga
- Infraorder: Cucujiformia
- Superfamily: Curculionoidea
- Family: Curculionidae
- Genus: Trypophloeus
- Species: T. populi

Binomial name
- Trypophloeus populi Hopkins, 1915

= Trypophloeus populi =

Species of beetle

Tyrpophloeus populi is a species of bark beetle that have been suggested as the cause of sudden aspen decline. It was first described by the American entomologist Andrew Delmar Hopkins.

Bark beetles have been reported to have lengths ranging from 1.7 to 2.1 millimeters, with their length approximately 2.3 times as long as they are wide. They come in black and dark brown body colors.

Tyrpophloeus populi has been found throughout North America, from eastern Nevada and northern Arizona to Saskatchewan and New Brunswick.
