= Shongelo Lake =

U.S. state of Mississippi

- Location within Mississippi Location within the United States
- Location: Smith County, Mississippi
- Coordinates: 32°05′55″N 89°30′46″W
- Type: lake
- Basin countries: United States
- Surface elevation: 440 ft (134 m)

Shongelo Lake is a lake in the U.S. state of Mississippi.

Shongelo is a name derived from the Choctaw language meaning "cypress tree".
