= Harrell Prairie Botanical Area =

Tallgrass prairie nature preserve near Forest, Mississippi

- Harrell Prairie Hill
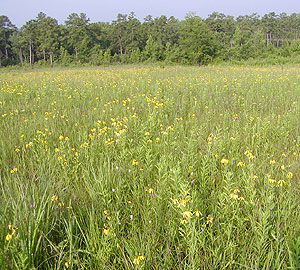
- Harrell Prairie Hill, a landmark in the area

- Location within Mississippi Location within the United States
- Location: Scott County, Mississippi
- Nearest city: Forest
- Coordinates: 32°20′09″N 89°26′23″W
- Area: 160 acres (65 ha)
- Established: 1980

U.S. National Natural Landmark
- Designated: 1976

Harrell Prairie Botanical Area or Harrell Prairie Hill is a 160-acre (65 ha) tallgrass prairie nature preserve located within Bienville National Forest near Forest, Mississippi. It is a rare remaining example of the Jackson Prairie Belt in Mississippi. It was declared a National Natural Landmark in May 1976 and a Botanical Area by the Forest Service in 1980.

== Description ==
There are 68 identified prairies in the National Forest, locally called cedar fields, which avoided agriculture development due to their purchase by lumber companies. Harrell Hill contains the "largest and least disturbed" example of the Jackson Prairie in Mississippi. The Jackson Prairie is a disjunct of the Black Belt (or Black Prairie) physiographic area in Mississippi and Alabama.

The alkaline soils (pH greater than 7.5) of the Maytag series ensure unique ecosystems unlike the nearby woodlands of Loblolly Pine (Pinus taeda). Common grasses include Little Bluestem (Schizachyrium scoparium), Indiangrass (Sorghastrum nutans), Big Bluestem (Andropogon gerardii)), Broomsedge Bluestem (A. virginicus var. virginicus), Bushy Broomsedge (A. glomeratus), and Switchgrass (Panicum virgatum). Other herbaceous plants include Yellow Coneflower (Rudbeckia pinnata), Eastern Purple Coneflower (Echinacea purpurea), Blazing Star (Liatris spp.), False Boneset (Brickellia eupatorioides var. eupatorioides), Green Milkweed (Asclepias hirtella), Green Comet Milkweed (A. viridiflora), Purple Prairie Clover (Dalea purpurea var. purpurea), White Prairie Clover (D. candida var. candida), Aster (Symphyotrichum spp.), Tick-trefoil (Desmodium spp.), Rosepink (Sabatia angularis), Smooth Oxeye (Heliopsis helianthoides), Little-leaved Mountain Mint (Pycnanthemum tenuifolium) and Wild Bergamot (Monarda fistulosa).

It is also an example of the geophysical transformation of the Mississippi River Delta.

== Visiting ==
There are no trails or facilities in the area. There is parking along the side of FS 515 and a sign indicating the area. Many of the flowering species are in bloom in late spring. Since it is a nature preserve, there is a leave no trace policy to protect the rare species.
