= Minnetonka Cave =

Limestone cave in Idaho, United States

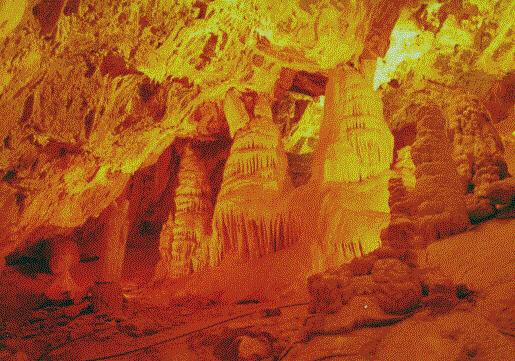
- Minnetonka Cave, administered by the U.S. Forest Service
- Interactive map of Minnetonka Cave
- Location: Bear Lake County, Idaho, United States
- Coordinates: 42°5′14″N 111°31′07″W
- Discovery: 1907
- Geology: Karst cavern, Mississippian limestone
- Entrances: 1
- Difficulty: Easy
- Translation: Big/Large Water (Lakota/Dakota/Nakota)
- Pronunciation: (Mini-Tah-"nasal n"-Kah)

Minnetonka Cave is one of the larger limestone caves in the state of Idaho. It is located in Cache National Forest in Bear Lake County, Idaho, United States, above the village of St. Charles (located at the north end of Bear Lake). "Minnetonka" is a misunderstanding of the words Mni and Tanka, derived from one of three Indigenous dialects: Dakota, Lakota or Nakota. "Mni Tanka", pronounced (Mini-Tah-"nasal n"-Kah) translates into "Big/Large Water". Tours through the cave are offered from Memorial Day (weather permitting) through Labor Day by Aud-Di Recreational Services, the concessionaire that holds the special use permit from the United States Forest Service. The half-mile route through the cave is lined with stalactites and stalagmites.

The cave is a hibernaculum to five different species of bats. One species, the Townsend's Big-eared Bat (Corynorhinus townsendii), while not on the endangered species list is on the lists of both the State of Idaho and the Forest Service as a species of concern. The cave has a temperature of 40 degrees year round and restrictions are in place to prevent the spread of White Nose syndrome of bats.
