= Jackson Prairie =

Temperate grassland region in Mississippi

Coordinates: 32.389473°N 89.624519°W

The Jackson Prairie is a 611,200-acre (247,300 ha) temperate grassland ecoregion in Mississippi. It is a disjunct of the Black Belt (or Black Prairie) physiographic area.

== Description ==
The prairie is a narrow strip across the state from the Mississippi River to the border of Alabama. It is only 40 miles (64 km) across at its widest, and generally 10–30 miles (16–48 km) wide. It runs in a diagonal line from near Jackson in the northwest, through Bienville National Forest and southeast to the Alabama border.

The contrast between the alkaline soil of the prairies and the acidic soil of the forests causes the sharp delineation in plant types in each region. In the western portion of the prairie, the soil is a brown loess loam over calcareous clay. In hilly areas, the clay is covered by red and yellow sand from the Pliocene epoch. The underlying clay, an identifying component of the Jackson Prairie Belt, shrinks and swells dramatically based on the amount of rainwater. Each cycle adds to the mounds and depressions, building them up over time.

The prairies depend on periodic outbreaks of fire to keep the forest from overgrowing the prairie.

== Flora and fauna ==
The prairie used to support quantities of bobwhite quail (Colinus virginianus), eastern wild turkey (Meleagris gallopavo silvestris), and a variety of songbird species.

== Conservation ==
Because of the soil and climate, this ecoregion is ideally suited for farming, leading to most of the prairie being converted into farmland and crop agriculture. There are a few remaining sections in the Bienville National Forest, including the largest remaining undisturbed portion at the Harrell Prairie Botanical Area.

The Grassland Reserve Program of 2002 enabled agencies to purchase conservation easements to protect prairies.

== See also ==
- Harrell Prairie Botanical Area
- Texas blackland prairies
