= Noxon Rapids Dam =

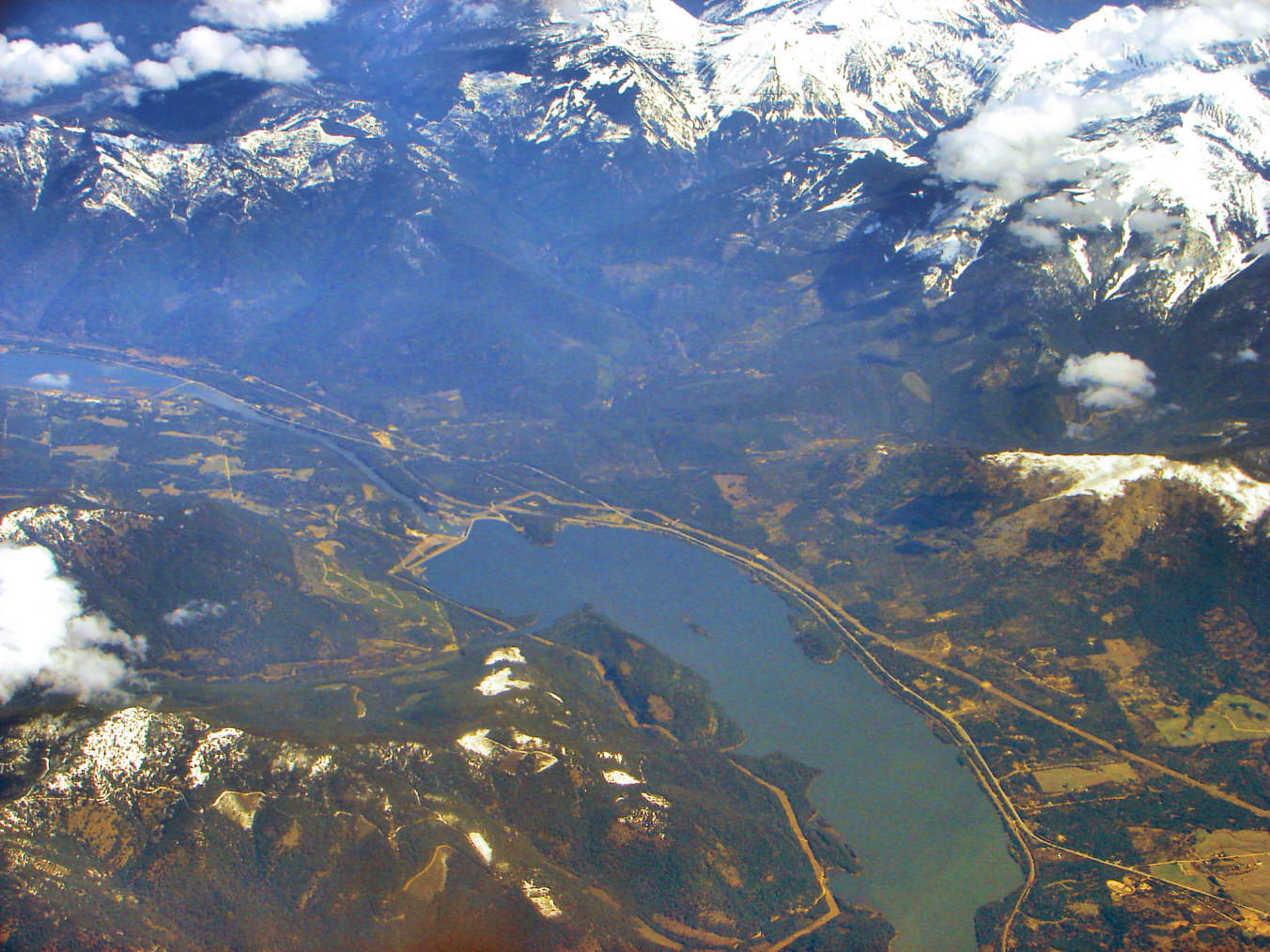
- Aerial view of the reservoir and dam
- Location: Sanders County, Montana
- Construction began: 1955
- Opening date: 1959
- Construction cost: $85 million
- Operator(s): Avista

Dam and spillways
- Impounds: Clark Fork
- Height: 260 ft (79 m)
- Length: 5,840 ft (1,780 m)

Reservoir
- Creates: Noxon Reservoir
- Total capacity: 400,000 acre-feet (490,000,000 m^{3})
- Catchment area: 21,800 sq mi (56,500 km²)
- Surface area: 7,700 acres (3,100 hectares)

Power Station
- Operator(s): Avista
- Turbines: 5
- Installed capacity: 527 MW

Noxon Rapids Dam is an earthfill gravity-type hydroelectric dam on the Clark Fork river, in the northwest part of the U.S. state of Montana.

The dam is located in the far northwest of Montana near the Idaho border. Downriver of Noxon Rapids Dam the Clark Fork is again impounded by the Cabinet Gorge Dam.

The operating capacity of Noxon Rapids Dam at full turbine flow and full pool is 527 MW. The project is owned and operated by Avista.

== See also ==
- List of dams in the Columbia River watershed
