= U.S. Route 20 in Idaho =

Section of U.S. Highway in Idaho

U.S. Highway 20
- Idaho Medal of Honor Highway
- US 20 highlighted in red

Route information
- Maintained by ITD
- Length: 406.30 mi (653.88 km)
- Existed: 1940–present

Major junctions
- West end: US 20 / US 26 at the Oregon state line in Nyssa, OR
- US 95 in Parma; I-84 / US 30 in Caldwell; I-84 / US 30 in Garden City; I-84 / US 26 / US 30 in Mountain Home; US 26 in Carey; US 26 / US 93 in Atomic City; I-15 in Idaho Falls
- East end: US 20 at the Montana state line near West Yellowstone, MT

Location
- Country: United States
- State: Idaho
- Counties: Payette, Canyon, Ada, Elmore, Camas, Blaine, Butte, Bingham, Bonneville, Jefferson, Madison, Fremont

Highway system
- United States Numbered Highway System; List; Special; Divided; Idaho State Highway System; Interstate; US; State
← SH-19	→ SH-21

U.S. Highway 20 (US 20) is the portion of an east–west United States Numbered Highway in the state of Idaho. It begins northwest of Parma at the Oregon state line and enters Montana 9.6 miles (15.4 km) away from the Yellowstone National Park west entrance.

Since 2019, US 20 has been designated as the Idaho Medal of Honor Highway.

== Route description ==
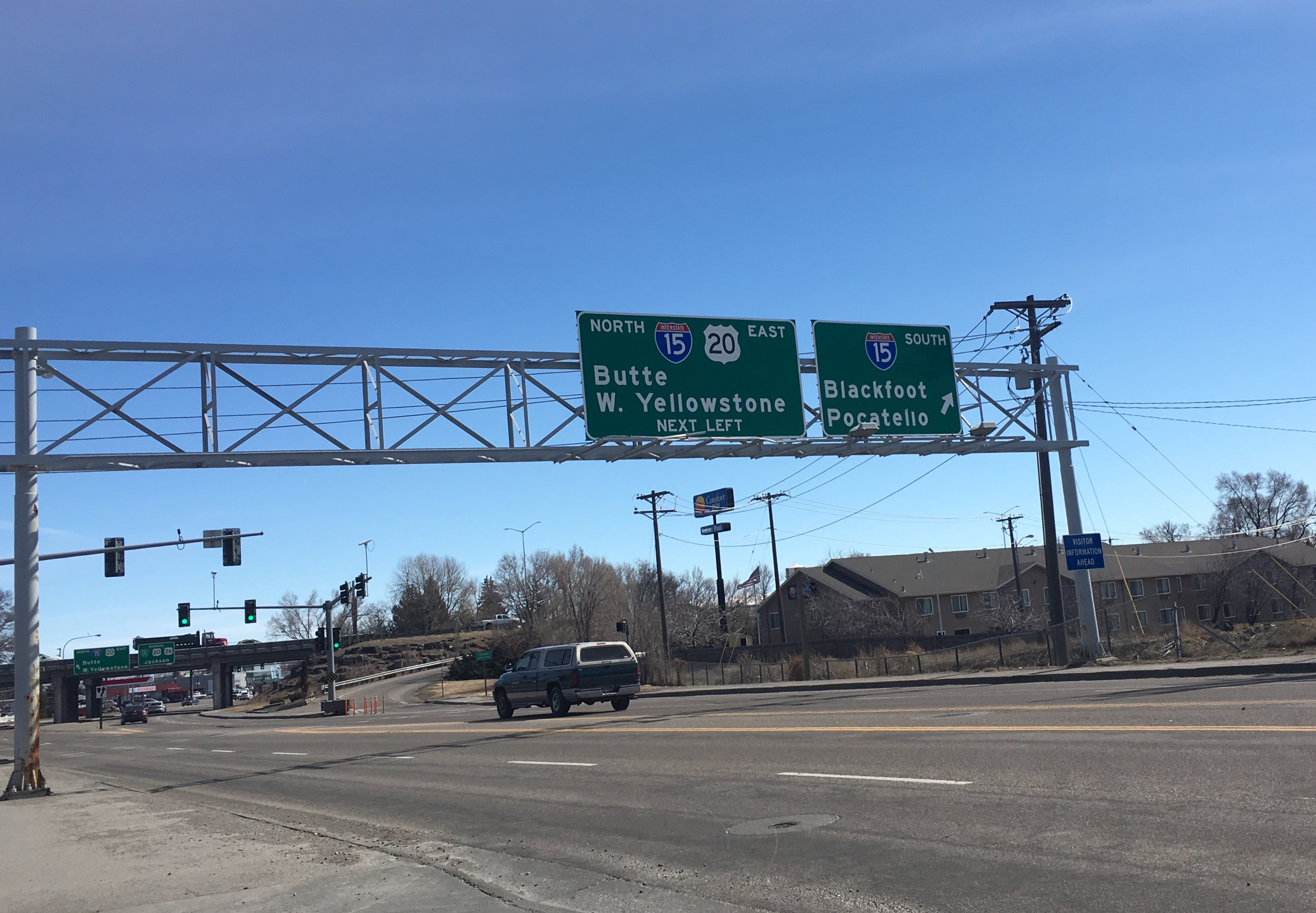
I-15/US 20 junction in Idaho Falls

At the western border, adjacent to Nyssa, Oregon, US 20 (running concurrently with US 26) crosses the Snake River into Idaho at an approximate elevation of 2,200 feet (670 m) above sea level. It joins US 95 and runs southbound to Parma. US 20/US 26 leaves US 95 southeast of Parma and runs to Caldwell, where it briefly joins Interstate 84 (I-84; and US 30) from exit 26 until exit 29.

These four highways parallel each other east (on two roadways) to Boise where US 20/US 26 runs through downtown, then southbound on Broadway Avenue to rejoin with I-84/US 30 at exit 54. The four concurrent routes head southeast to Mountain Home, where US 20 departs at exit 95 to head east, past Rattlesnake Station, Anderson Ranch Dam road, and crests at Cat Creek summit at 5,527 feet (1,685 m). This portion of the route is near Goodale's Cutoff of the Oregon Trail.

US 20 continues east, into, and across Camas County through Fairfield to Timmerman Junction, the intersection in Blaine County with State Highway 75 (SH-75), the northbound route to Sun Valley, Galena Summit, and Stanley. US 20/US 26 goes through Picabo and Carey, joins with US 93, and on to Craters of the Moon National Monument and Preserve and Arco, where US 93 splits off and turns north-northwest to climb the Big Lost River valley.

US 20/US 26 continues on through Idaho National Laboratory, where the highways split just west of Atomic City; US 26 heads southeast to Blackfoot and US 20 to Idaho Falls, where it turns north-northeast to pass near Rexburg as a freeway. US 20 then climbs through the communities of St. Anthony, Ashton, and Island Park, and crosses the Continental Divide at Targhee Pass at 7,072 feet (2,156 m), entering Montana west of West Yellowstone.

== History ==
US 20 was expanded past Yellowstone National Park in 1940, replacing the original US 191 and several state highways. Its original alignment through Boise included Main Street and Fairview Avenue for westbound and eastbound traffic, respectively, and Capitol Boulevard. US 20 and US 26 were realigned onto Myrtle and Front streets as well as Broadway following the completion of the Boise Connector extension on August 7, 1992.

The Rigby Freeway section of US 20, extending from Idaho Falls to St. Anthony, was constructed in the 1970s. Its northernmost section still featured at-grade intersections until the 2000s, when they were replaced with full interchanges, though a few at grade crossings still exist between Sugar City and St. Anthony as of September 2023.

== Major intersections ==
County	Location	mi	km	Exit	Destinations	Notes
Snake River		0.000	0.000		US 20 west / US 26 west – Nyssa	Continuation into Oregon
Snake River		0.000	0.000		Snake River Bridge; Oregon–Idaho state line	
Payette–Canyon county line		1.578	2.540		US 95 north – Fruitland, Payette	Western end of US 95 concurrency
Canyon		9.647	15.525		US 95 south – Jordan Valley	Eastern end of US 95 concurrency
Canyon	Caldwell	21.995– 22.129	35.398– 35.613		I-84 / US 30 west – Ontario	Western end of I-84/US 30 concurrency; I-84 exit 26
Canyon	Caldwell	22.6– 23.1	36.4– 37.2	27	I-84 BL east to SH-19 – Caldwell, Wilder, Homedale	Exit numbers follow I-84
Canyon	Caldwell	23.5– 24.1	37.8– 38.8	28	10th Avenue – City Center	Exit numbers follow I-84
Canyon	Caldwell	24.840– 24.994	39.976– 40.224		I-84 / US 30 east – Nampa, Boise	Eastern end of I-84/US 30 concurrency; I-84 exit 29
Ada		34.267	55.147		SH-16 – Emmett	
Ada	Boise–Eagle line	40.229	64.742		SH-55 – Caldwell, Eagle	
Ada	Garden City	44.166	71.078		SH-44 – Eagle	
Ada	Boise	47.205	75.969	—	Main Street	Western end of freeway; westbound entrance only
Ada	Boise	47.300	76.122	—	I-184 west to I-84	Eastern terminus of I-184; westbound left exit and eastbound left entrance
Ada	Boise	48.050	77.329	—	River Street	Eastbound exit only
Ada	Boise	48.512	78.072	—	Front Street west	Eastern end of freeway; westbound exit only
Ada	Boise	51.960	83.622		Federal Way	Interchange
Ada	Boise	52.681– 52.824	84.782– 85.012		I-84 / US 30 west / Commerce Avenue – Nampa	Western end of I-84/US 30 concurrency; I-84 exit 54
Ada	Boise	55.3	89.0	57	SH-21 (Gowen Road) – Idaho City	Exit numbers follow I-84
Ada		57.9	93.2	59	S. Eisenman Road, Memory Road	Signed as exits 59A (S. Eisenman Road) and 59B (Memory Road) eastbound
Ada		61.9	99.6	64	Blacks Creek Road – Kuna	
Ada	Regina	69.2	111.4	71	Mayfield, Orchard	
Elmore		72.8	117.2	74	Simco Road	
Elmore		88.7	142.7	90	I-84 BL east to SH-51 / SH-67 – Mountain Home, Bruneau	Eastbound signage
Elmore		88.7	142.7	90	West Mountain Home	Westbound signage
Elmore	Mountain Home	95.308– 95.467	153.383– 153.639		I-84 / US 26 / US 30 east / I-84 BL west (SH-51) – Mountain Home, Twin Falls, Air Force Base, Duck Valley	Eastern end of I-84/US 26/US 30 concurrency; I-84 exit 95
Camas	Fairfield	156.157	251.310		SH-46 – Gooding, Wendell	
Blaine		178.095	286.616		SH-75 – Shoshone, Challis	
Blaine	Carey	196.039	315.494		US 26 / US 93 – Bliss, Twin Falls	Western end of US 26/US 93 concurrency
Butte	Arco	248.555	400.010		US 93 – Challis	Eastern end of US 93 concurrency
Butte	Butte City	256.073	412.110		SH-33 – Howe	
Butte	Atomic City	263.77	424.50		US 26 – Idaho Falls	Eastern end of US 26 concurrency
Bingham	No major junctions					
Bonneville	Idaho Falls	306.9	493.9		I-15 south / I-15 BL / US 20 Bus. (Broadway Street east) to US 26 – Blackfoot, Pocatello, Jackson, Idaho Falls	Western end of I-15 concurrency; I-15 exit 118
Bonneville	Idaho Falls	307.617	495.062		I-15 north – Roberts, Butte, Airport	Eastern end of I-15 concurrency; I-15 exit 119; access to airport via Grandview Avenue; signalized interchange
Bonneville	Idaho Falls	307.617	495.062		Western end of Rigby Freeway	
Bonneville	Idaho Falls	307.72– 307.87	495.23– 495.47	307	Lindsay Boulevard	
Bonneville	Idaho Falls	307.967– 308.318	495.625– 496.190	308A	Riverside Drive – City Center	Signed as Exit 308 eastbound
Bonneville	Idaho Falls	308.504	496.489	308B	Science Center Drive	Eastbound exit and westbound entrance
Bonneville		309.585– 310.125	498.229– 499.098	310	US 20 Bus. – Lewisville	
Bonneville	Orvin	310.99– 311.739	500.49– 501.695	311	Saint Leon Road, 15th East	
Bonneville		313.063– 313.887	503.826– 505.152	313	Hitt Road, 25th East	
Bonneville	Ucon	314.92– 315.57	506.81– 507.86	315	SH-43 – Ucon	
Bonneville–Jefferson county line		317.559– 318.367	511.062– 512.362	318	County Line Road	
Jefferson	Rigby	320.375	515.594	320	US 20 Bus. to SH-48 – Rigby	Eastbound exit and westbound entrance
Jefferson	Rigby	322.083– 322.586	518.342– 519.152	322	US 20 Bus. – North Rigby	Eastbound signage
Jefferson	Rigby	322.083– 322.586	518.342– 519.152	322	US 20 Bus. to SH-48 – Rigby	Westbound signage
Jefferson	Lorenzo	325.202– 325.898	523.362– 524.482	325	Menan, Roberts	
Snake River		326.2	525.0	Bridge		
Madison		328.232	528.238	328	Thornton	
Madison	Rexburg	331.63– 332.27	533.71– 534.74	332	BYU-Idaho, South Rexburg	
Madison	Rexburg	333.198– 333.77	536.230– 537.15	333	SH-33 – Salmon, Rexburg	
Madison	Rexburg	336.53– 337.098	541.59– 542.507	337	North Rexburg	
Madison	Sugar City	338.018	543.987	338	Sugar City, Salem	Eastbound exit and westbound entrance
Madison	Sugar City	338.522– 339.295	544.798– 546.042	339	To SH-33 east – Driggs, Jackson, Sugar City	Eastern end of Rigby Freeway
Fremont		343.64	553.03	343	East 400 North	Interchange
Fremont	St. Anthony	345.2– 345.91	555.5– 556.69	346	US 20 Bus. east – St. Anthony	Interchange
Fremont		347.851	559.812		US 20 Bus. west – St. Anthony	
Fremont	Ashton	360.572	580.284		SH-47 to SH-32 – Driggs	
Fremont	Island Park	402.27	647.39		SH-87 – Ennis	
Continental Divide		406.3	653.9		Targhee Pass; Idaho–Montana state line	
Continental Divide		406.3	653.9		US 20 east – West Yellowstone, Bozeman	Continuation into Montana
1.000 mi = 1.609 km; 1.000 km = 0.621 mi: Concurrency terminus; Incomplete access; Route transition

U.S. Route 20
Previous state: Oregon	Idaho	Next state: Montana
