= Nicholson Peak =

Mountain in the state of Idaho

- Location within Idaho

Highest point
- Elevation: 11,040 ft (3,360 m)
- Prominence: 815 ft (248 m)
- Parent peak: Little Diamond Peak
- Coordinates: 44°04′49″N 113°05′56″W

Geography
- Location: Butte County, Idaho, U.S.
- Parent range: Lemhi Range
- Topo map: USGS Fallert Springs

Nicholson Peak, at 11,040 feet (3,360 m) above sea level is a peak in the Lemhi Range of Idaho located in Butte County in Salmon-Challis National Forest. It is about 1.5 mi (2.4 km) west-northwest of Little Diamond Peak and 2 mi (3.2 km) southwest of Shoshone John Peak. It is the 98th highest peak in Idaho.
