= National Register of Historic Places listings in Teton County, Idaho =

Location of Teton County in Idaho

This is a list of the National Register of Historic Places listings in Teton County, Idaho.

This is intended to be a complete list of the properties and districts on the National Register of Historic Places in Teton County, Idaho, United States. Latitude and longitude coordinates are provided for many National Register properties and districts; these locations may be seen together in a map.

There are 5 properties and districts listed on the National Register in the county. More may be added; properties and districts nationwide are added to the Register weekly.

This National Park Service list is complete through NPS recent listings posted May 23, 2025.

== Current listings ==
	Name on the Register	Image	Date listed	Location	City or town	Description
1	Hollingshead Homestead		February 9, 2006 (#06000002)	107 W. 1200 N. County Road; 43°53′43″N 111°07′09″W	Tetonia	
2	Pierre's Hole 1832 Battle Area Site	Pierre's Hole 1832 Battle Area Site	September 7, 1984 (#84001197)	South of Driggs; 43°40′22″N 111°07′43″W	Driggs	
3	Spud Drive-In Theater	Spud Drive-In Theater	June 5, 2003 (#99001475)	2175 State Highway 33; 43°41′22″N 111°06′30″W	Driggs	
4	Teton County Courthouse	Teton County Courthouse	September 22, 1987 (#87001589)	Main St. 43°43′28″N 111°06′36″W	Driggs	
5	Victor Railroad Depot	Victor Railroad Depot	April 27, 1995 (#95000508)	70 Depot St. 43°36′13″N 111°06′46″W	Victor	

== See also ==
- List of National Historic Landmarks in Idaho
- National Register of Historic Places listings in Idaho
