= Idaho State Highway 22 =

State highway in Idaho, United States

State Highway 22
- SH-22 highlighted in red

Route information
- Maintained by ITD
- Length: 43.936 mi (70.708 km)

Major junctions
- South end: SH-33 near Howe
- SH-28 near Blue Dome
- North end: I-15 in Dubois

Location
- Country: United States
- State: Idaho
- Counties: Butte, Clark, Jefferson

Highway system
- Idaho State Highway System; Interstate; US; State
← SH-21	→ SH-24

State Highway 22 (SH-22) is a 43.936-mile-long (70.708 km) state highway in Idaho from SH-33 to Interstate 15 (I-15) in Dubois.

== Route description ==
SH-22 begins at SH-33 near Arco and travels northeast across the desert before intersecting SH-28 and slowly bending east, passing by some farmland. The highway ends in the city of Dubois at a diamond interchange with I-15.

== History ==
The current SH-22 bears no resemblance to its original configuration. The route of the original SH-22 was based on Sampson Trails G and H from Mountain Home to Trude, which are essentially the route of today's US 20 from Mountain Home through Arco to Idaho Falls and US 26 east from there.

The current configuration is based on the original SH-29 from the 1937 map.

== Junction list ==
County	Location	mi	km	Destinations	Notes
Butte		0.000	0.000	SH-33	Eastern end of SH-33 overlap
Clark		13.588	21.868	SH-28 – Salmon	
Jefferson	No major junctions				
Clark		43.478	69.971	Small Road	Old US 91
Clark	Dubois	43.936	70.708	I-15 – Idaho Falls, Butte	I-15 exit 167; eastern terminus.
1.000 mi = 1.609 km; 1.000 km = 0.621 mi: Concurrency terminus

== See also ==
- List of state highways in Idaho
- List of highways numbered 22
