= Idaho State Highway 28 =

State highway in Idaho, United States

State Highway 28
- Sacajawea Historic Byway
- SH-28 highlighted in red

Route information
- Maintained by ITD
- Length: 135.645 mi (218.299 km)

Major junctions
- South end: SH-33 west of Mud Lake
- SH-29 in Leadore
- North end: US 93 in Salmon

Location
- Country: United States
- State: Idaho

Highway system
- Idaho State Highway System; Interstate; US; State
← SH-27	→ SH-29

State Highway 28 (SH-28) is a 135.645-mile-long (218.299 km) state highway in Idaho which runs from Idaho State Highway 33 (SH-33) near Mud Lake to U.S. Route 93 in Salmon. The entire length of the route is designated as the Sacajawea Historic Byway by the state of Idaho.

== Route description ==
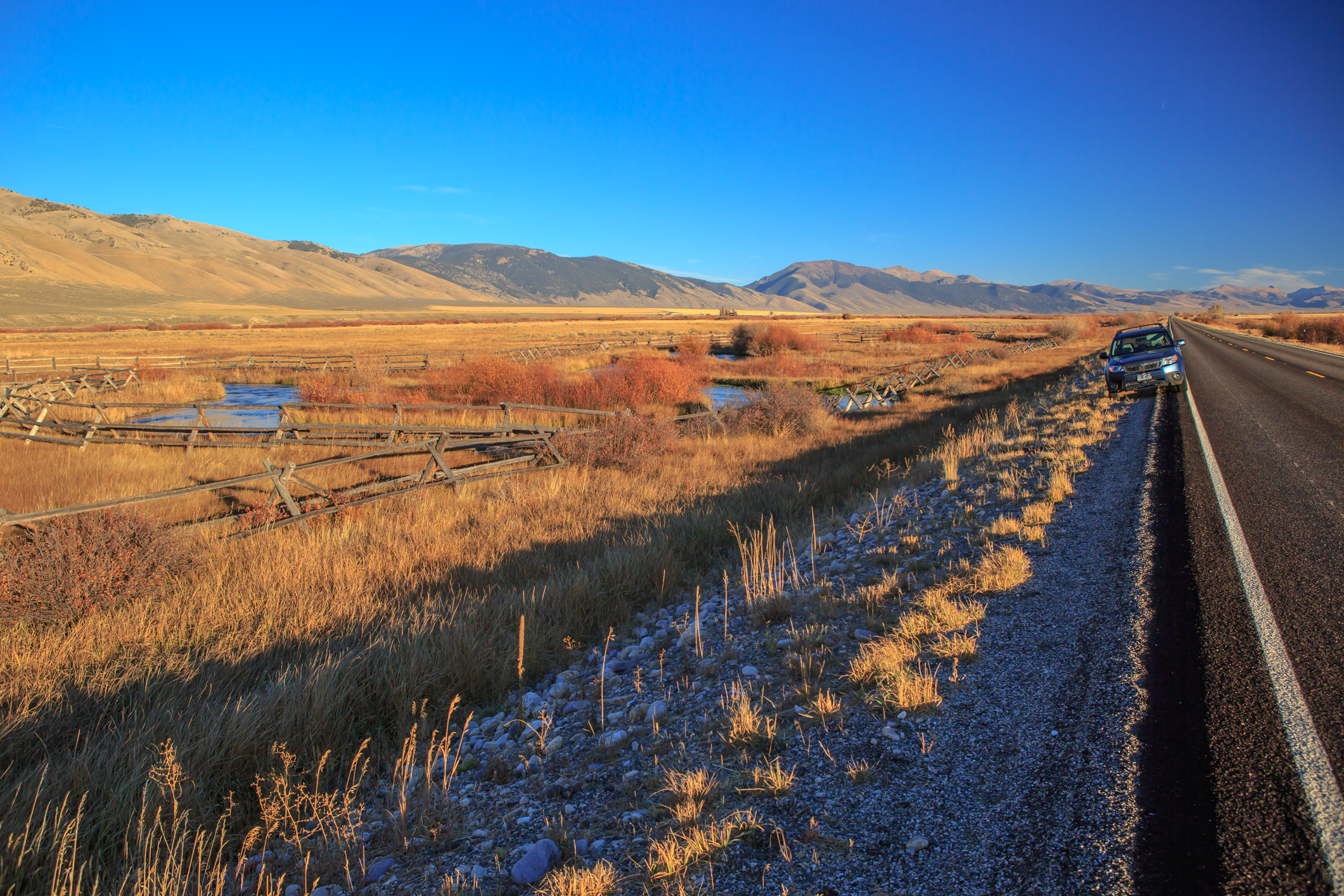
View along Idaho State Highway in Lemhi Valley, October 2012

Idaho State Highway 28 begins at an intersection with ID 33. The route heads northwest before passing the Mud Lake Airport, proceeding to an intersection with State Highway 22. After a long distance, it proceeds through the Lemhi Valley, bending north before curving northwest again for a short distance. The roadway passes the Leadore Airport on its way into Leadore, meeting Idaho State Highway 29 while in the community. Just after exiting the town, the road travels parallel to the Lemhi River for several miles before ending at U.S. Route 93 in the community of Salmon.

== Major junctions ==
County	Location	mi	km	Destinations	Notes
Jefferson		0.000	0.000	SH-33 – Rexburg, Idaho Falls, INL Site North	Southern terminus; Sacajawea Historic Byway continues on SH-33 east 15.15 miles (24.38 km) to I-15
Butte	No major junctions				
Clark		15.460	24.880	SH-22 – Arco, Dubois	
Lemhi	Leadore	75.079	120.828	SH-29 – Dillon	Southern terminus of SH-29; former SH-28 north
Lemhi	Salmon	120.495	193.918	US 93 – Hamilton, Missoula, Challis	Northern terminus; highway continues as US-93 north (Main Street west)
1.000 mi = 1.609 km; 1.000 km = 0.621 mi

== See also ==
- List of state highways in Idaho
- List of highways numbered 28
