= Lost streams of Idaho =

Group of partially subterranean rivers in Idaho, United States

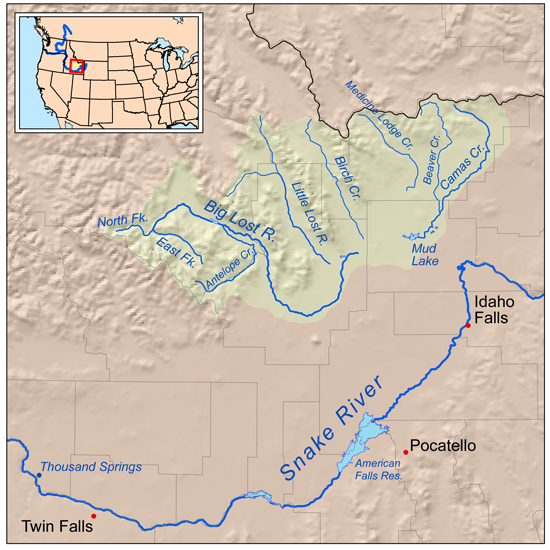
Map of the lost streams of Idaho

There are two rivers in Idaho named "Lost", the Big Lost River and the Little Lost River. They are often considered separate streams, but both flow into the same depression and become subterranean, feeding the Snake River Aquifer. The rivers are located in Custer County and Butte County, in Idaho in the United States. Via the aquifer and numerous springs, they are tributaries of the Snake River.

== Course ==
The Big Lost River is about 135 miles (217 km) long and has two main tributary forks, the North Fork Big Lost River and the East Fork Big Lost River. The river originates in the Pioneer Mountains in Salmon-Challis National Forest, flows northeast then turns southeast, with the Lost River Range to the east separating the Big Lost River Valley from the Little Lost River Valley. A dam impounds the river and creates Mackay Reservoir. Near Arco the river enters the Snake River Plain, curves east and then northeast and enters the depression where the water flows into the ground, called Big Lost River Sinks. Near the sinks there is a dry distributary called the Dry Channel Big Lost River.

The Little Lost River is about 49 miles (79 km) long. It flows southeast between the Lost River Range to the west and the Lemhi Range to the east. It enters the Snake River Plain north of the sinks and flows into them at locations called Little Lost River Sinks.

The sinks and the lower courses of both rivers are within the land of the Idaho National Laboratory, northeast of Craters of the Moon. Water from both rivers emerges about 100 miles (160 km) away at Thousand Springs near Hagerman and other springs downstream of Twin Falls. Due to irrigation using the aquifer's water, most of the rivers' water is pumped out of the ground, used to irrigate crops, and returned to the ground as irrigation drainage, where it eventually emerges at the springs and joins the Snake River.

== Basin and discharge ==
The Big Lost River's drainage basin is approximately 1,400 square miles (3,626 km^{2}) in area Its mean annual discharge, as measured by USGS gage 13132500 (Big Lost River near Arco), is 91.7 cubic feet per second (2.60 m^{3}/s), with a maximum daily recorded flow of 1,840 cu ft/s (52 m^{3}/s), and a minimum of zero flow.

The Little Lost River's drainage basin is approximately 971 square miles (2,515 km^{2}) in area Its mean annual discharge, as measured by USGS gage 13118700 (Little Lost River below Wet Creek, near Howe, Idaho), is 65 cubic feet per second (1.8 m^{3}/s), with a maximum daily recorded flow of 486 cu ft/s (14 m^{3}/s), and a minimum of 3 cu ft/s (0.085 m^{3}/s).

== See also ==
- List of rivers in Idaho
- Losing stream
- Tributaries of the Columbia River
