= Idaho State Highway 33 =

State highway Idaho, United States

State Highway 33
- SH-33 highlighted in red

Route information
- Maintained by ITD
- Length: 139.934 mi (225.202 km)

Major junctions
- West end: US 20 / US 26 near Arco
- SH-22 near Howe; SH-28 near Mud Lake; I-15 near Terreton; US 20 in Rexburg; SH-32 near Tetonia; SH-31 in Victor
- East end: WYO 22 at the Wyoming state line

Location
- Country: United States
- State: Idaho
- Counties: Butte, Jefferson, Madison, Fremont, Teton

Highway system
- Idaho State Highway System; Interstate; US; State
| ← SH-32 | → SH-34 |

State Highway 33 (SH-33) is a state highway in eastern Idaho, spanning from U.S. Highway 20 (US 20) and US 26 to Wyoming Highway 22 (WYO 22) at the state line.

== Route description ==
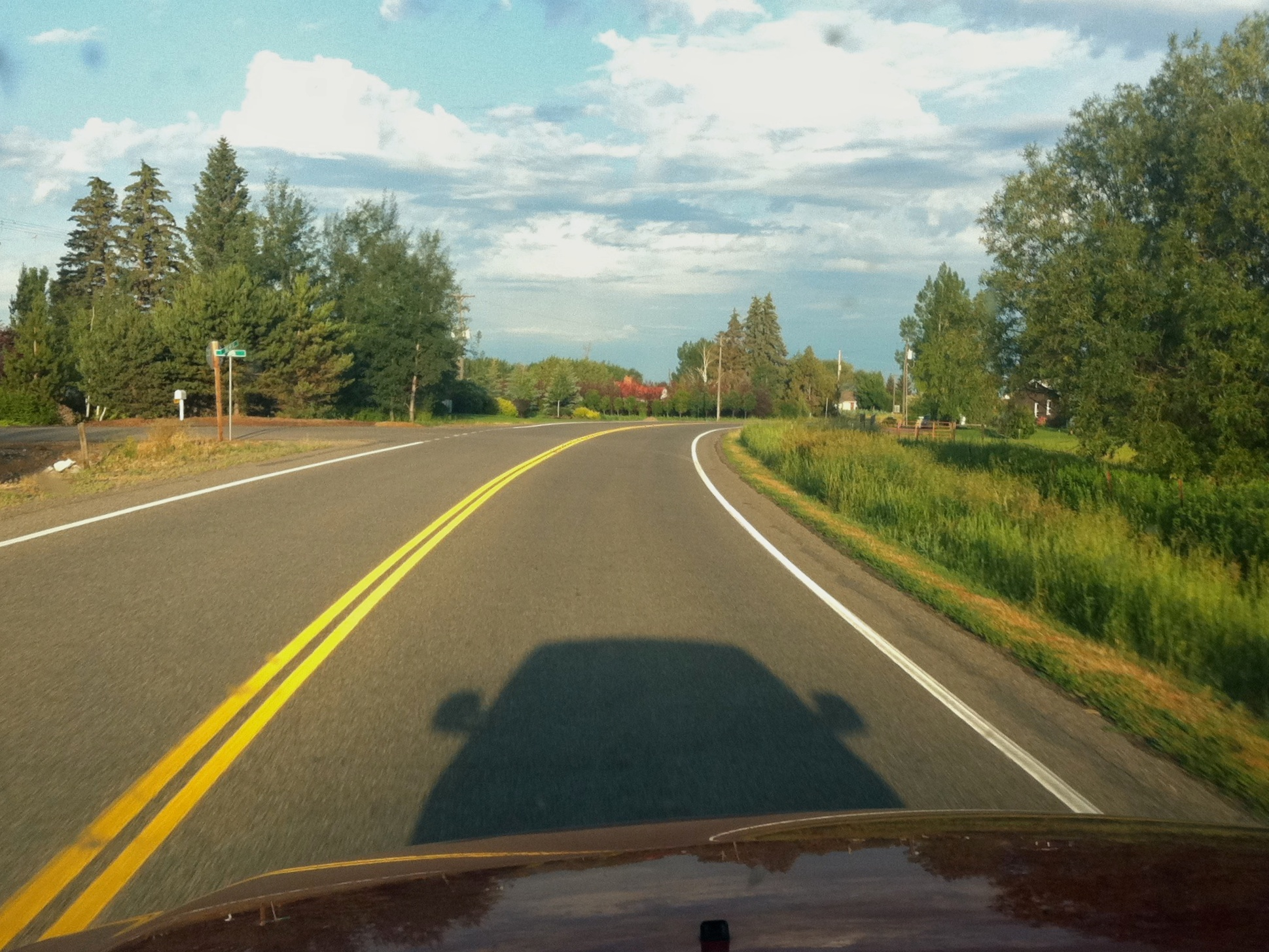
SH-33 in Teton, July 2011

SH-33 begins at an intersection with US 20/US 26 in Butte County. It proceeds to the northeast, passing through the small community of Howe and turning to the east at an intersection with the Little Lost River Highway. The highway continues to an intersection with SH-22, then enters Idaho National Laboratory. The highway makes a turn to the north, then again to the east, giving road access to a couple INL facilities.

The highway then crosses into Jefferson County, leaving INL after 9 miles (14 km) and immediately meets with SH-28, then passes through the small agricultural towns of Mud Lake and Terreton. The highway continues east to an interchange with I-15 at Sage Junction. The highway continues east over lava flows, crossing into Madison County and passes over the Henrys Fork and just north of the Menan Buttes.

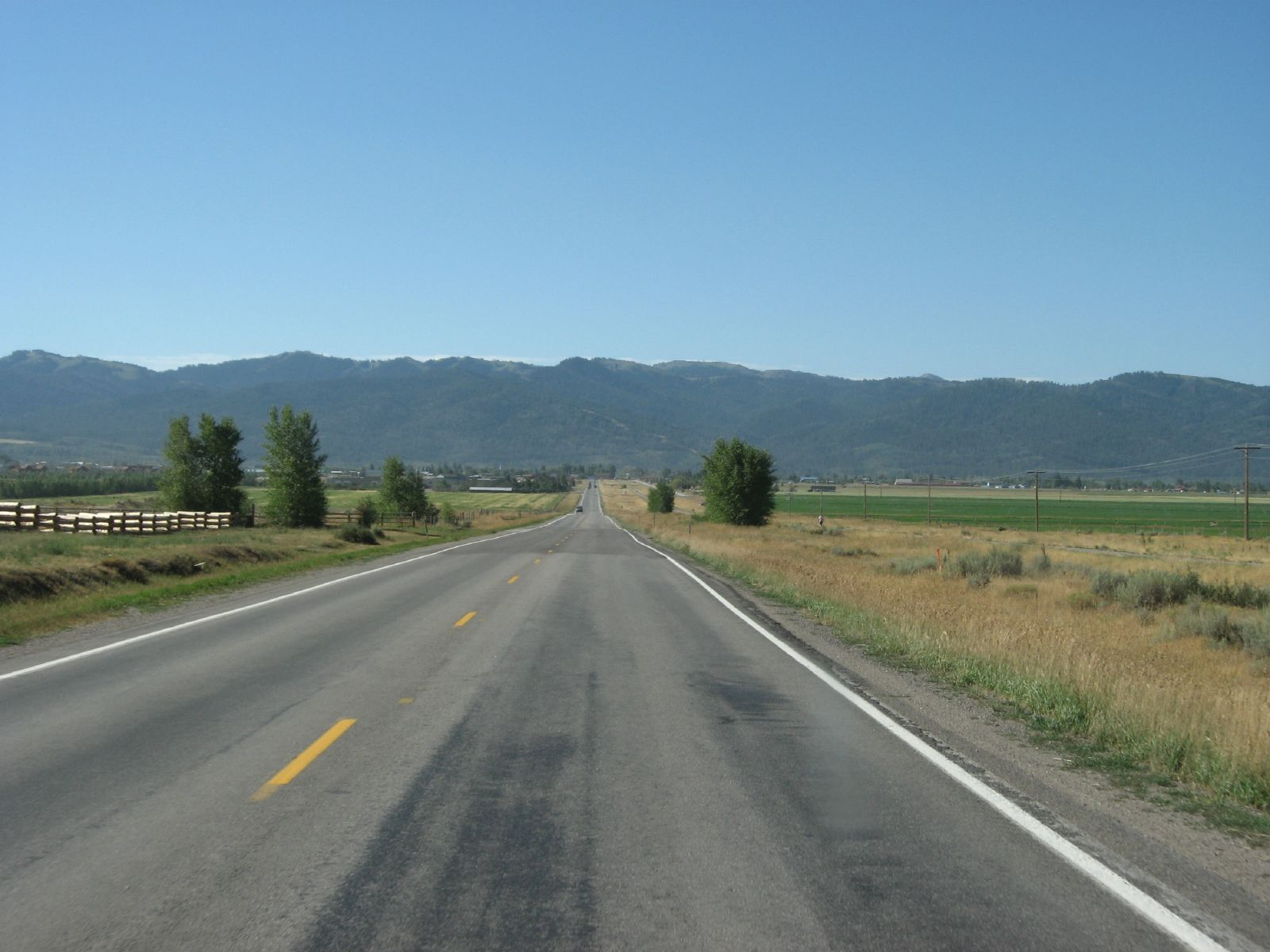
SH-33 between Driggs and Victor

The highway enters Rexburg city limits just before a diverging diamond interchange with US 20. Signage at this interchange suggests that a Highway 33 Spur continues into downtown Rexburg with no indication of where the mainline highway goes, but no official source shows that to be the case. The highway continues east on Main Street past the Rexburg Municipal Airport and through the downtown until reaching 2nd East, where the highway turns to the north, passing through the main commercial core of the city. After a mile, the highway turns to the northeast, following a railroad to Sugar City. The highway turns to the east through downtown Sugar City, then back to the north at the edge of town near Sugar-Salem High School, where it meets 4000 North and turns east once again. Highway 33 Spur also meets Highway 33 at this intersection, travelling about 0.66 miles (1.06 km) west to meet up with US 20.

The highway continues east, passing signage warning truck drivers of the upcoming Teton Pass 60 miles (97 km) ahead, then through the small towns of Teton and Newdale, then past the failed Teton Dam site. It continues east over a plateau that separates the Upper Snake River Plain from Teton Valley, crossing into Teton County. As the highway drops off the plateau, it crosses over the Teton River, intersects SH-32, and passes through Tetonia before turning south. The route passes the Driggs-Reed Memorial Airport and enters the city of Driggs. The road proceeds southward through Driggs, intersecting SH-31 in the community of Victor, then turns to the southeast. The highway enters into the southern foothills of the Teton Range and reaches the state line with Wyoming, where it becomes WYO 22 as the Teton Pass Highway and eventually to Jackson, Wyoming.

== Major intersections ==
| County | Location | mi | km | Destinations | Notes |
|---|---|---|---|---|---|
| Butte | | 0.000 | 0.000 | US 20 / US 26 – Blackfoot, Arco, Boise | Western terminus |
| Butte | Howe | 15.929 | 25.635 | Little Lost River Highway north – Goldburg | Southern terminus of the Little Lost River Hwy. |
| Butte | | 24.680 | 39.719 | SH-22 north – Dubois | Southern terminus of SH-22 |
| Jefferson | | 43.620 | 70.200 | SH-28 north (Sacajawea Historic Byway north) – Salmon | Southern terminus of SH-28 |
| Jefferson | Sage Junction | 58.861 | 94.728 | I-15 – Butte, Idaho Falls | Southern terminus of Sacajawea Historic Bwy.; exit 143 on I-15 |
| Madison | Rexburg | 78.190 | 125.835 | US 20 – St. Anthony, Idaho Falls, Pocatello | Exit 333 on US-20 |
| Fremont | No major junctions | | | | |
| Madison | No major junctions | | | | |
| Teton | Tetonia | 131.070 | 210.937 | SH-32 – Ashton | Southern terminus of SH-32 |
| Teton | Victor | 149.622 | 240.793 | SH-31 west (Center Street) – Swan Valley, Idaho Falls | Eastern terminus of SH-31 |
| Teton | | 155.084 | 249.584 | WYO 22 east (Teton Pass Highway) – Jackson | Continuation into Wyoming |
| Teton | 1.000 mi = 1.609 km; 1.000 km = 0.621 mi | | | | |
