= Butte County High School =

Coordinates: 43.633°N 113.302°W

- 120 S. Water St. Arco, Idaho; United States

Information
- Type: Public
- Motto: Unity, Ownership, Competitor
- Established: 1950, 76 years ago
- School district: Butte County J.S.D. #111
- Principal: Robert Chambers
- Teaching staff: 14.80 (FTE)
- Grades: 9-12
- Enrollment: 188 (2023–2024)
- Student to teacher ratio: 12.70
- Colors: Black, White, & Orange
- Athletics: IHSAA Class 1A Div I
- Athletics conference: Nuclear Conference
- Mascot: Pirate
- Elevation: 5,310 ft (1,620 m) AMSL
- Website: Butte High School

Location in the United States
Location in Idaho

Butte County High School is a high school in Arco, Idaho, the seat of Butte County. Despite its extremely small size—the school had an enrollment of 166 students in 2004/5—the school has won multiple awards and championships in interscholastic competition.

== Extracurricular activities ==
=== Scholastics ===
They have a scholastics team, a type of team jeopardy in which one team competes against another team from other schools. Though they have never won the state championship, they have come close.

In 1994 the Scholastic team placed 3rd in the state and in 1995 the team placed 2nd in its division. Later in the 2013-2014 school year the scholastic team placed third in their regional competition.

=== Academic Decathlon ===
The school also has been home to an Academic Decathlon team. This team has placed numerous times as the state champion in its division and scholarships were awarded to the individual team members that placed in the top three of the category.

=== Debate ===
The school's debate teams have won state championships in 1967 (Class A Open) 1965 and 1966 (Class B Girls), and in 1974, 1978 and 1982.

Members of the debate team have also qualified and competed at the National level and the National Forensic League (NFL) tournament.

=== Athletics ===
The Butte Pirates girls basketball team won the IHSAA state championship in Class 1A Division. II in February 2017.

The Butte Pirates boys basketball team won the IHSAA state championship in Class 1A (Div. I) title in 2013.

The previous state championships in girls basketball were in 2006, 2007, and 2012 in the 2A classification. The 2006 championship team won the Class 2A title with a 75-49 win over Soda Springs, and finished the season as undefeated champions. The 2004 girls basketball team holds the state Class 2A record for most points scored in the playoff tournament (214) and highest average points per game (71.3), set during the 2006 playoffs. The boys basketball team also won the state championship in class 2A in 1983.

The girls track team won the 1972 Class B IHSAA State championship.

A track team member holds the Class 2A state record in the high jump, clearing 6-10.5, a record set in 2004.

The girls volleyball team won the state championships in class 2A in 1987, 1989, and 1996.

The baseball team won the 2005 Class 2A Academic State Championship.

== Alumni ==
- Warren Jones - justice, Idaho Supreme Court, class of 1961
