= Little Lost River =

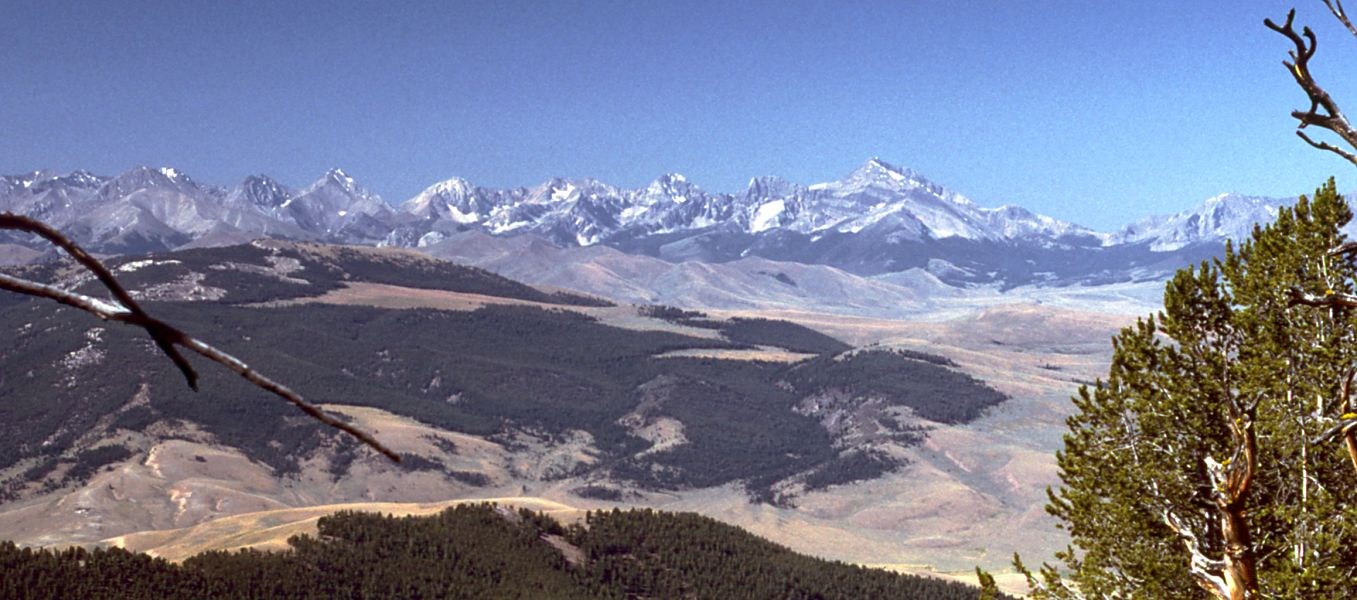
- The Little Lost River Valley viewed from the west slope of the Lemhi Range

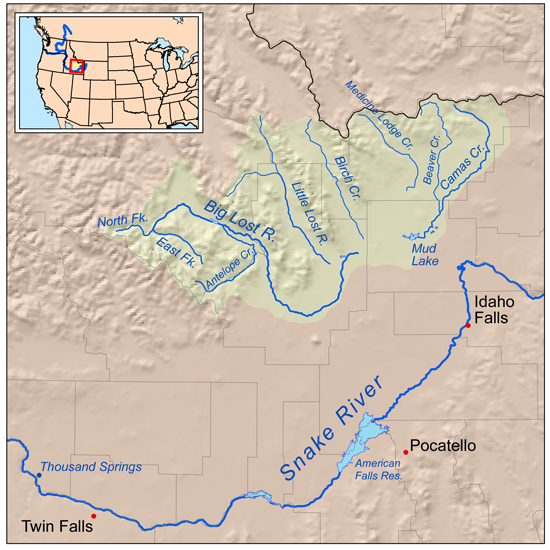
- Map of the lost streams of Idaho including the Little Lost River

Location
- Country: United States
- State: Idaho
- City: Howe

Physical characteristics
- Source: Confluence of Sawmill and Summit Creeks
  - location: Upper Little Lost River Valley, Butte County
  - coordinates: 44°11′14″N 113°16′45″W
  - elevation: 6,100 ft (1,900 m)
- Mouth: Little Lost River Sinks
  - location: Near Howe, Butte County
  - coordinates: 43°45′52″N 112°58′22″W
  - elevation: 4,806 ft (1,465 m)
- Length: 49 mi (79 km), Northwest-southeast
- Basin size: 963 sq mi (2,490 km^{2})
- Discharge
  - average: 64.1 cu ft/s (1.82 m^{3}/s)
  - minimum: 3 cu ft/s (0.085 m^{3}/s)
  - maximum: 509 cu ft/s (14.4 m^{3}/s)

Basin features
- Tributaries
  - left: Sawmill Creek, Uncle Ike Creek
  - right: Summit Creek, Wet Creek

The Little Lost River is a river in the central part of the U.S. state of Idaho. It is approximately 49 miles (79 km) long and drains an arid farming valley, the Little Lost River Valley, bordered by the Lost River Range on the west and Lemhi Range on the east. Instead of emptying into a larger body of water, it disappears into the ground at the edge of the Snake River Plain, a phenomenon that gives it its name. The water feeds into the Snake River Aquifer, eventually reaching the Snake River through a series of springs farther west.

== Course ==
The river rises at the confluence of two similarly sized streams, Summit Creek and Sawmill Creek, 10 miles (16 km) north of Hawley Mountain, in the middle of the Little Lost River Valley. The river flows generally south-southeast receiving many tributaries such as Wet (the largest), Badger, Deer, Uncle Ike, Sands, Cedarville, South, and Hurst creeks. Along its course the Little Lost is used for irrigation, but the only settlement of any size is Howe, situated near the mouth. A few miles past Howe, the river disappears into the earth at about 4,806 feet (1,465 m) above sea level.

The river drains about 963 square miles (2,490 km^{2}) of land entirely in Butte County. Its valley is about 50 miles (80 km) long and 20 miles (32 km) wide, with a floor width of 7 miles (11 km). Precipitation is generally very low and mostly in the form of snow.

== Highway ==
The Little Lost River Highway is a north–south highway in Butte County that is 31.2 miles (50.2 km) long and roughly parallels the lower Little Lost River. The road begins in the community of Howe, at an intersection with SH-33, then runs roughly north-northwest towards the settlement of Clyde. Along the way, the highway crosses the Little Lost River twice. Three and a half miles (5.6 km) north of Clyde, the highway becomes Pahsimeroi Road.

== See also ==
- Big Lost River
- List of rivers of Idaho
