= Victor station (Idaho) =

- Victor Railroad Depot
- U.S. National Register of Historic Places
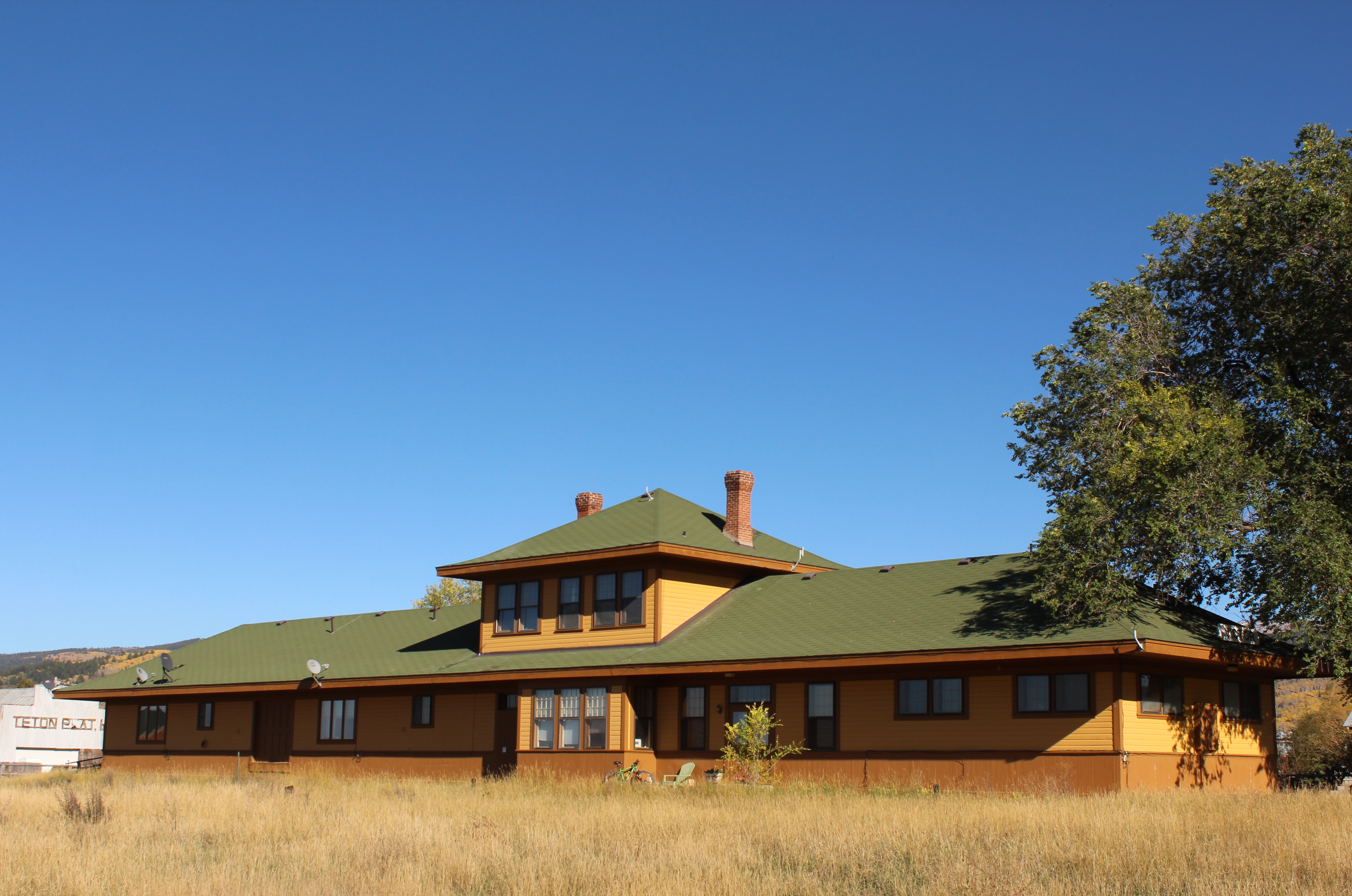
- The building's exterior in 2014

- Location within Idaho Location within the United States
- Location: 70 Depot St., Victor, Idaho
- Coordinates: 43°36′13″N 111°6′46″W
- Area: 1 acre (0.40 ha)
- Built: 1913
- Built by: Union Pacific Railroad
- NRHP reference No.: 95000508
- Added to NRHP: April 27, 1995

The Victor Railroad Depot is a two-story building located in Victor, Idaho which was listed on the National Register of Historic Places in 1995.

It is 150 by 26 feet (45.7 m × 7.9 m) in plan. It was built originally with its first floor providing a large freight room, a baggage room, and a ticket office, and with its second floor providing crew layover quarters. It was expanded to the south in 1928 to add a large waiting room, dressing rooms, and restrooms. It served as a combination freight and passenger station.

== See also ==
- List of National Historic Landmarks in Idaho
- National Register of Historic Places listings in Teton County, Idaho
