= The Riddler (Idaho) =

Mountain in Idaho, United States

- Location within Idaho

Highest point
- Elevation: 11,560 ft (3,520 m)
- Prominence: 560 ft (170 m)
- Parent peak: Diamond Peak
- Coordinates: 44°07′33″N 113°05′09″W

Geography
- Location: Butte County, Idaho, U.S.
- Parent range: Lemhi Range
- Topo map: USGS Diamond Peak

Climbing
- Easiest route: Simple climbing, class 4

The Riddler, at 11,560 feet (3,520 m) above sea level is the third highest peak in the Lemhi Range of Idaho. The peak is located in Butte County on the border of Caribou-Targhee National Forest and Salmon-Challis National Forest. Diamond Peak is 1.1 mi (1.8 km) north of the peak and Big Boy Peak is 0.7 mi (1.1 km) to the southeast. It is the 41st highest peak in Idaho.
