= Little Diamond Peak =

Mountain in the state of Idaho

- Location within Idaho

Highest point
- Elevation: 11,272 ft (3,436 m)
- Prominence: 872 ft (266 m)
- Parent peak: Big Boy Peak
- Coordinates: 44°04′35″N 113°04′11″W

Geography
- Location: Butte County, Idaho, U.S.
- Parent range: Lemhi Range
- Topo map: USGS Fallert Springs

Little Diamond Peak, at 11,272 feet (3,436 m) above sea level, is a mountain in the Lemhi Range of Idaho, United States. The peak is located in Butte County on the border of Caribou-Targhee National Forest and Salmon-Challis National Forest. It is 1.8 mi (2.9 km) south of Shoshone John Peak and 2.8 mi (4.5 km) south of Big Boy Peak, its line parent. It is the 68th highest peak in Idaho.
