= Hollingshead Homestead =

- U.S. National Register of Historic Places
- Location within Idaho Location within the United States
- Location: 107 W. 1200 N. County Road
- Nearest city: Tetonia, Idaho
- Coordinates: 43°53′43″N 111°7′9″W
- Area: 5 acres (2.0 ha)
- Built: 1906
- Built by: Hollingshead, Miles and Karl
- NRHP reference No.: 06000002
- Added to NRHP: February 9, 2006

Hollingshead Homestead is a historic homestead located at 107 W. 1200 N. County Road in Teton County, Idaho, near the city of Tetonia. Brothers Miles and Karl Hollingshead established the homestead in 1906, claiming the land under the Homestead Act of 1862. At the time, Eastern Idaho was one of the few places where homesteaders could claim productive farmland, as its climate had discouraged earlier settlement. The brothers built a farm on the land, reflecting the region's agricultural economy.

Eight buildings and four structures remain at the homestead. The brothers built their original log house, called the "chicken coop", when they first settled the homestead. In the early 1910s, the brothers constructed a new log house with a stone foundation. Around this time, the brothers also built a granary and horse barn. A smokehouse, a barn which later became a granary, a privy, and three grain bins were added in the 1930s. The last two buildings, a dwelling and a forge, were built in the 1950s using poteaux-sur-sol construction; the method, which uses vertical logs to form walls, is uncommon in Idaho.

The homestead was added to the National Register of Historic Places on February 9, 2006.

== See also ==
- List of National Historic Landmarks in Idaho
- National Register of Historic Places listings in Teton County, Idaho
