= Idaho State Highway 47 =

State highway in Fremont County, Idaho, United States

State Highway 47
- SH-47 highlighted in red

Route information
- Maintained by ITD
- Length: 12.420 mi (19.988 km)

Major junctions
- West end: US 20 in Ashton
- SH-32 east of Ashton
- East end: 4350 East and 1900 North northwest of Warm River

Location
- Country: United States
- State: Idaho
- Counties: Fremont

Highway system
- Idaho State Highway System; Interstate; US; State
← SH-46	→ SH-48

State Highway 47 (SH‑47) is a 12.420-mile (19.988 km) state highway in Fremont County, Idaho, United States, that connects U.S. Route 20 (US 20) in Ashton with the Mesa Falls Scenic Byway (northeast of Warm River).

== Route description ==
SH‑47 starts at an intersection with US 20 and heads due east as Main Street through Ashton. The highway continues east after an intersection with the northern terminus of Idaho State Highway 32, passing through Marysville as East 1300 North. Slowly, SH‑47 bends to the north as Mesa Falls Scenic Byway, going through Warm River and crossing over the same-named river. SH‑47 ends in the Targhee National Forest.

== Major intersections ==
The entire route is in Fremont County.

Location	mi	km	Destinations	Notes
Ashton	0.000	0.000	East 1300 North west	Continuation west from western terminus
Ashton	0.000	0.000	US 20 north – Island Park, West Yellostone (Montana) US 20 south – St. Anthony, Sugar City, Rexburg, Idaho Falls	Western terminus
	1.010	1.625	North 3600 East north SH-32 south (North 3600 East) – Tetonia, Driggs, Rexburg	Northern end of SH-32
	12.420	19.988	4350 East / 1900 North	Eastern terminus
	12.420	19.988	Mesa Falls Scenic Byway – Island Park	Continuation north from eastern terminus
1.000 mi = 1.609 km; 1.000 km = 0.621 mi

== See also ==
- List of state highways in Idaho
