= Idaho State Highway 32 =

State highway in Teton and Fremont counties in Idaho, United States

State Highway 32
- SH-32 highlighted in red

Route information
- Maintained by ITD
- Length: 28.386 mi (45.683 km)

Major junctions
- South end: SH-33 near Tetonia
- North end: SH-47 near Ashton

Location
- Country: United States
- State: Idaho
- Counties: Teton, Fremont

Highway system
- Idaho State Highway System; Interstate; US; State
| ← SH-31 | → SH-33 |

State Highway 32 (SH-32) is a 28.386-mile-long (45.683 km) state highway in Idaho. It runs from SH-33 to SH-47.

== Route description ==
SH-32 begins at an intersection with SH-33 near the town of Tetonia. It travels north, passing through rural farmland and crossing Bitch Creek and into Fremont County. It makes a series of shallow turns, eventually heading due west, before turning north again, crossing the Fall River in the process. The road ends at SH-47, near the town of Ashton.

== Major intersections ==
| County | Location | mi | km | Destinations | Notes |
|---|---|---|---|---|---|
| Teton | | 0.000 | 0.000 | SH-33 – Driggs, Jackson, WY, Rexburg | Southern terminus of SH 33 |
| Fremont | | 28.386 | 45.683 | SH-47 to US 20 – Ashton | Northern terminus of SH 33 |
1.000 mi = 1.609 km; 1.000 km = 0.621 mi

== See also ==
- List of state highways in Idaho
- List of highways numbered 32
