= Shoshone John Peak =

Mountain in the state of Idaho

- Location within Idaho

Highest point
- Elevation: 11,212 ft (3,417 m)
- Prominence: 532 ft (162 m)
- Parent peak: Big Boy Peak
- Coordinates: 44°06′09″N 113°04′22″W

Geography
- Location: Butte County, Idaho, U.S.
- Parent range: Lemhi Range
- Topo map: USGS Fallert Springs

Shoshone John Peak, at 11,212 feet (3,417 m) above sea level is a peak in the Lemhi Range of Idaho. The peak located in Butte County on the border of Caribou-Targhee National Forest and Salmon-Challis National Forest. It is about 1 mi (1.6 km) south of Big Boy Peak, its line parent, and 1.8 mi (2.9 km) north of Little Diamond Peak. It is the 76th highest peak in Idaho.
