= Big Lost River =

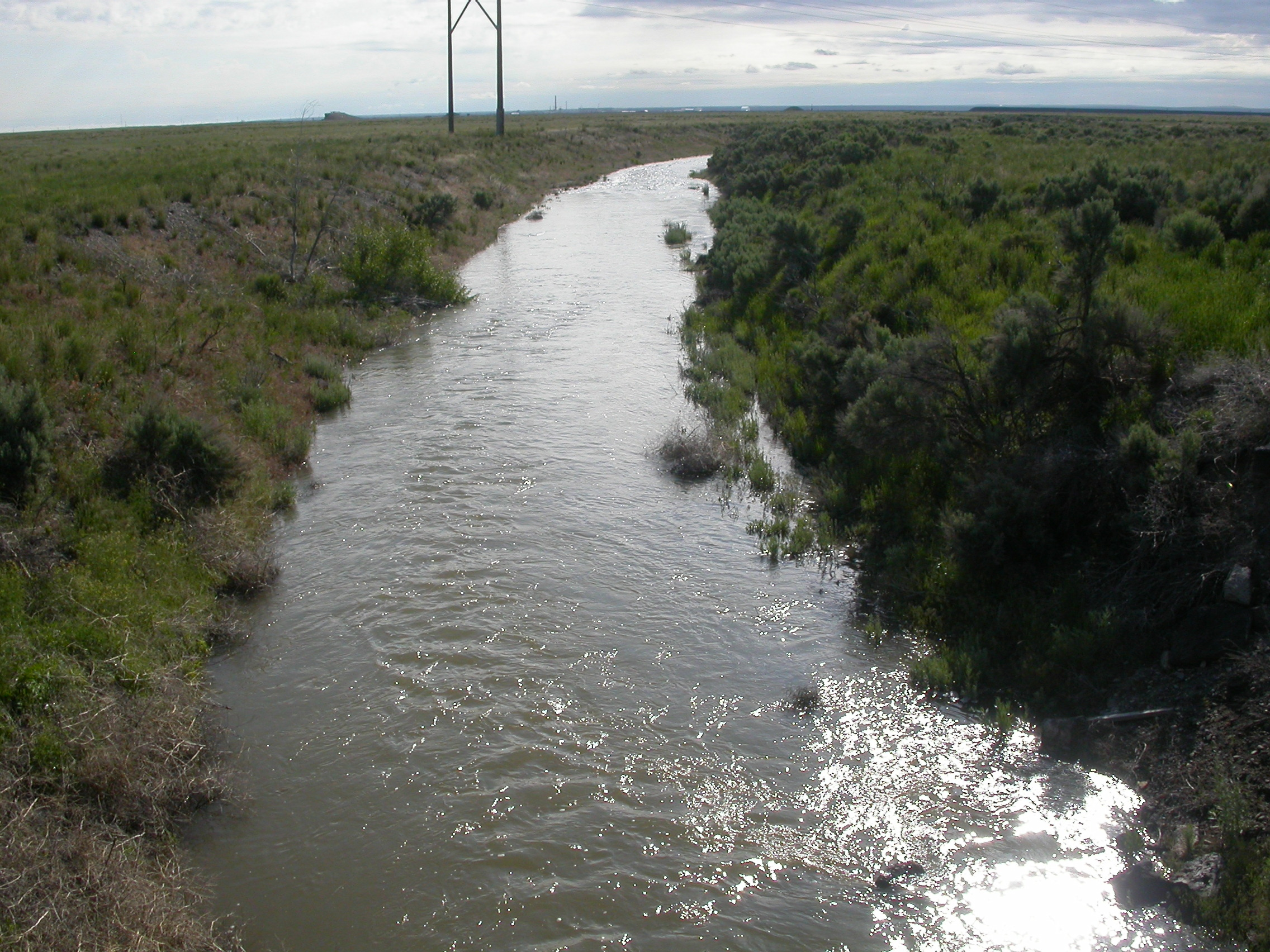

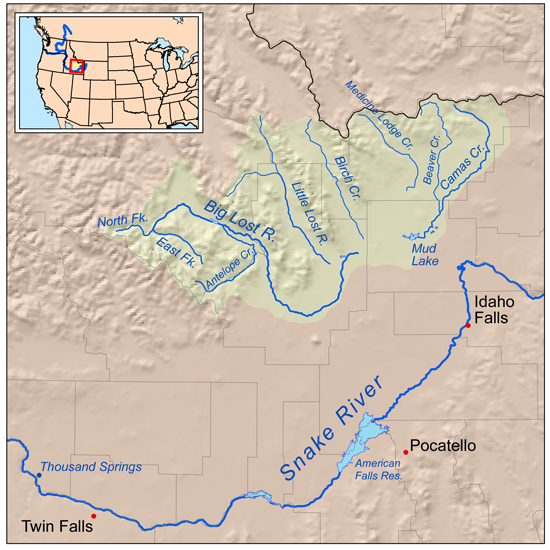
- Map of the lost streams of Idaho including the Big Lost River

Location
- Country: United States
- State: Idaho
- Cities: Mackay, Arco, Atomic City

Physical characteristics
- Source: Confluence of North Fork and East Fork Big Lost River
  - location: Custer County, Idaho
  - coordinates: 43°56′01″N 114°06′38″W
  - elevation: 6,860 ft (2,090 m)
- Mouth: Big Lost River Sinks
  - location: Butte County, Idaho
  - coordinates: 43°47′39″N 112°50′26″W
  - elevation: 4,790 ft (1,460 m)
- Length: 135 mi (217 km)
- Basin size: 1,867 sq mi (4,840 km^{2})
- Discharge
  - location: near Arco
  - average: 86.3 cu ft/s (2.44 m^{3}/s)
  - minimum: 0 cu ft/s (0 m^{3}/s)
  - maximum: 2,500 cu ft/s (71 m^{3}/s)

Basin features
- Tributaries
  - left: North Fork Big Lost River, Thousand Springs Creek
  - right: East Fork Big Lost River, Antelope Creek

The Big Lost River is a major river in the U.S. state of Idaho, about 135 miles (217 km) long.

== Description ==
The river starts in the Rocky Mountains and flows in a generally southeast direction into the Snake River Plain. True to its name, the Big Lost River's surface flow does not reach any larger river but vanishes into the Snake River Aquifer at the Big Lost River Sinks, giving the river its name. The river is one of the Lost streams of Idaho, several streams that flow into the plain and disappear into the ground.

It rises at the confluence of the North Fork and East Fork Big Lost River deep in the Pioneer Mountains, a subrange of the Rockies, in Custer County, south-central Idaho. It flows northeast, then turns sharply southeast at the confluence with Thousand Springs Creek, which comes in from the left and into Butte County. The river is dammed to form Mackay Reservoir near the town of Mackay, then continues south through an agricultural valley, passing Arco. After Arco, the river begins flowing east, northeast, and finally due north. The river terminates at the Big Lost River Sinks, a patch of marshland where its water drains into the ground.

Even though its surface flow is lost (hence its name) a short distance out of the mountains, the river is hydrologically connected to the Snake River, the largest river of Idaho by discharge, via the Snake River Aquifer and various springs along the course of the Snake in its journey through the plain.

== See also ==
- Little Lost River
- List of rivers of Idaho
- List of longest streams of Idaho
