= Idaho State Highway 31 =

State highway in Idaho, United States

State Highway 31
- Pine Creek Road
- SH-31 highlighted in red

Route information
- Maintained by ITD
- Length: 21.025 mi (33.836 km)

Major junctions
- South end: US 26 in Swan Valley
- North end: SH-33 in Victor

Location
- Country: United States
- State: Idaho
- Counties: Bonneville, Teton

Highway system
- Idaho State Highway System; Interstate; US; State
← SH-29	→ SH-32

State Highway 31 (SH-31) is a 21.025-mile-long (33.836 km) north-south state highway in the eastern part of the U.S. state of Idaho. SH-31 runs from U.S. Route 26 (US-26) in Swan Valley north to SH-33 in Victor. The highway is maintained by the Idaho Transportation Department. It is known as Pine Creek Road within Bonneville County. It is also known West Center Street in "downtown" Victor.

== Route description ==
SH-31 begins at an intersection with US-26 in Swan Valley. The highway leaves Swan Valley to the northeast, crossing Rainey Creek and entering a rural part of Bonneville County. The route turns north before heading northwest, then turning north again. After crossing Pine Creek, SH-31 heads northeast and enters Targhee National Forest. The highway enters a mountainous region at this point, passing to the south of Stouts Mountain. SH-31 crosses North Pine Creek before crossing into Teton County. It passes the Pine Creek Campground before leaving Targhee National Forest. The highway enters a rural area and begins a more easterly course. It turns northeast into Victor, then turns east, becoming Center Street. SH-31 terminates at SH-33 in central Victor.

== Major intersections ==
County	Location	mi	km	Destinations	Notes
Bonneville	Swan Valley	0.000	0.000	US 26 – Irwin, Ririe, Idaho Falls	Southern terminus of SH 31
Teton	Victor	21.025	33.836	SH-33 – Driggs, Jackson, WY	Northern terminus of SH 31
1.000 mi = 1.609 km; 1.000 km = 0.621 mi

== See also ==
- List of state highways in Idaho
- List of highways numbered 31
