= Haden, Idaho =

Coordinates: 43°49′30″N 111°10′47″W

Haden is a ghost town in Teton County, in the U.S. state of Idaho.

== History ==
The first settlement at Haden was made in 1889. Haden was platted in 1905. A post office called Haden was established in 1890, and remained in operation until 1913. The community was named after Ferdinand V. Hayden, a geologist. When the railroad was built through the area, business activity shifted to nearby Tetonia.
