= Big Boy Peak =

Mountain in the state of Idaho

- Location within Idaho

Highest point
- Elevation: 11,402 ft (3,475 m)
- Prominence: 322 ft (98 m)
- Parent peak: The Riddler
- Coordinates: 44°07′00″N 113°04′43″W

Geography
- Location: Butte County, Idaho, U.S.
- Parent range: Lemhi Range
- Topo map: USGS Fallert Springs

Climbing
- Easiest route: Scramble, class 3

Big Boy Peak, at 11,402 feet (3,475 m) above sea level is a peak in the Lemhi Range of Idaho. The peak is located in Butte County on the border of Caribou-Targhee National Forest and Salmon-Challis National Forest. It is about 0.75 mi (1.21 km) southeast of The Riddler and 1 mi (1.6 km) north of Shoshone John Peak. It is the 50th highest peak in Idaho.
