= Terreton, Idaho =

Unincorporated community in the state of Idaho, United States

Coordinates: 43°50′30″N 112°26′11″W

Terreton is an unincorporated agricultural community in Jefferson County, Idaho, United States. It is located at an altitude of 4,790 feet, east of Mud Lake. The ZIP Code for Terreton is 83450.
