= Butte City, Idaho =

- City
- Location of Butte City in Butte County, Idaho.

- Location within Idaho
- Coordinates: 43°36′25″N 113°14′27″W
- Country: United States
- State: Idaho
- County: Butte

Area
  - Total: 0.17 sq mi (0.44 km^{2})
  - Land: 0.17 sq mi (0.44 km^{2})
  - Water: 0 sq mi (0.00 km^{2})
- Elevation: 5,315 ft (1,620 m)

Population (2020)
  - Total: 78
  - Density: 460/sq mi (180/km^{2})
- Time zone: UTC-7 (Mountain (MST))
  - Summer (DST): UTC-6 (MDT)
- Area codes: 208, 986
- FIPS code: 16-11710
- GNIS feature ID: 2409950

Butte City is a city in Butte County, Idaho, United States. The population was 78 at the 2020 census.

== Geography ==
According to the United States Census Bureau, the city has a total area of 0.16 square miles (0.41 km^{2}), all of it land.

== Demographics ==
Historical population
Census	Pop.	Note	%±
1960	104		—
1970	42		−59.6%
1980	93		121.4%
1990	59		−36.6%
2000	76		28.8%
2010	74		−2.6%
2020	78		5.4%
U.S. Decennial Census

=== 2010 census ===
At the 2010 census, there were 74 people, 41 households, and 22 families in the city. The population density was 462.5 per square mile (178.6/km^{2}). There were 51 housing units at an average density of 318.8 per square mile (123.1/km^{2}). The racial makeup was 86.5% White, 2.7% African American, 4.1% Native American, 5.4% from other races, and 1.4% from two or more races. Hispanic or Latino of any race were 13.5% of the population.

There were 41 households, of which 9.8% had children under 18 living with them, 51.2% were married couples living together, 2.4% had a male householder with no wife present, and 46.3% were non-families. 41.5% of all households comprised individuals, and 14.7% had someone living alone who was 65 or older. The average household size was 1.80 and the average family size was 2.36.

The median age was 58.5 years. 9.5% of residents were under 18; 1.4% were between 18 and 24; 16.3% were from 25 to 44; 39.2% were from 45 to 64; and 33.8% were 65 or older. The gender makeup was 58.1% male and 41.9% female.

=== 2000 census ===
At the 2000 census, there were 76 people, 36 households, and 19 families in the city. The population density was 378.9 inhabitants per square mile (146.3/km^{2}). There were 46 housing units at an average density of 229.3 per square mile (88.5/km^{2}). The racial makeup was 90.79% White, 1.32% Native American, 2.63% Asian, 5.26% from other races. Hispanic or Latino of any race were 10.53% of the population.

There were 36 households, of which 22.2% had children under 18 living with them, 41.7% were married couples living together, 2.8% had a female householder with no husband present, and 47.2% were non-families. 38.9% of all households comprised individuals, and 11.1% had someone living alone who was 65 years or older. The average household size was 2.11 and the average family size was 2.74.

23.7% of the population were under 18, 6.6% from 18 to 24, 25.0% from 25 to 44, 36.8% from 45 to 64, and 7.9% who were 65 years of age or older. The median age was 40 years. For every 100 females, there were 105.4 males. For every 100 females age 18 and over, there were 123.1 males.

The median household income was $17,250, and the median family income was $31,250. Males had a median income of $35,625 and females $22,500. The per capita income was $11,889. There were 25.0% of families and 30.7% of the population living below the poverty line, including 45.8% of under eighteens and none over 64.
