= Howe, Idaho =

Unincorporated community in the state of Idaho, United States

- Unincorporated community
- Location within Idaho Location within the United States
- Coordinates: 43°47′01″N 113°00′17″W
- Country: United States
- State: Idaho
- County: Butte
- Elevation: 4,830 ft (1,470 m)
- Time zone: UTC-7 (Mountain (MST))
  - Summer (DST): UTC-6 (MDT)
- ZIP code: 83244
- Area codes: 208, 986
- GNIS feature ID: 383478

Howe is an unincorporated community in Butte County, Idaho, United States. Howe is located on Idaho State Highway 33 18 miles (29 km) northeast of Arco. Howe has a post office with ZIP code 83244.

== History ==
Howe's population was estimated at 50 in 1909, and was 25 in 1960.

== Climate ==
According to the Köppen Climate Classification system, Howe has a cold semi-arid climate, abbreviated "BSk" on climate maps. The hottest temperature recorded in Howe was 103 °F (39.4 °C) on July 15, 2002 and July 23–24, 2003, while the coldest temperature recorded was −38 °F (−38.9 °C) on February 1, 1985.

Climate data for Howe, Idaho, 1991–2020 normals, extremes 1914–present
Month	Jan	Feb	Mar	Apr	May	Jun	Jul	Aug	Sep	Oct	Nov	Dec	Year
Record high °F (°C)	58 (14)	75 (24)	74 (23)	86 (30)	96 (36)	102 (39)	103 (39)	102 (39)	100 (38)	85 (29)	69 (21)	58 (14)	103 (39)
Mean maximum °F (°C)	44.5 (6.9)	48.8 (9.3)	63.7 (17.6)	75.5 (24.2)	82.6 (28.1)	91.0 (32.8)	96.9 (36.1)	95.9 (35.5)	89.6 (32.0)	77.4 (25.2)	59.5 (15.3)	47.4 (8.6)	97.9 (36.6)
Mean daily maximum °F (°C)	29.9 (−1.2)	34.6 (1.4)	47.7 (8.7)	58.7 (14.8)	67.4 (19.7)	76.3 (24.6)	87.4 (30.8)	85.9 (29.9)	75.5 (24.2)	60.0 (15.6)	42.8 (6.0)	30.3 (−0.9)	58.0 (14.5)
Daily mean °F (°C)	18.6 (−7.4)	23.3 (−4.8)	36.0 (2.2)	45.1 (7.3)	53.5 (11.9)	61.0 (16.1)	69.2 (20.7)	67.3 (19.6)	57.4 (14.1)	45.1 (7.3)	30.9 (−0.6)	20.6 (−6.3)	44.0 (6.7)
Mean daily minimum °F (°C)	7.3 (−13.7)	12.0 (−11.1)	24.4 (−4.2)	31.6 (−0.2)	39.7 (4.3)	45.7 (7.6)	51.1 (10.6)	48.7 (9.3)	39.4 (4.1)	30.1 (−1.1)	18.9 (−7.3)	10.9 (−11.7)	30.0 (−1.1)
Mean minimum °F (°C)	−14.1 (−25.6)	−8.8 (−22.7)	7.6 (−13.6)	17.1 (−8.3)	25.8 (−3.4)	33.4 (0.8)	40.6 (4.8)	36.8 (2.7)	26.7 (−2.9)	14.4 (−9.8)	0.6 (−17.4)	−12.5 (−24.7)	−19.0 (−28.3)
Record low °F (°C)	−35 (−37)	−38 (−39)	−23 (−31)	1 (−17)	16 (−9)	25 (−4)	29 (−2)	28 (−2)	18 (−8)	−5 (−21)	−22 (−30)	−37 (−38)	−38 (−39)
Average precipitation inches (mm)	0.59 (15)	0.34 (8.6)	0.55 (14)	0.77 (20)	1.22 (31)	1.04 (26)	0.44 (11)	0.43 (11)	0.52 (13)	0.62 (16)	0.36 (9.1)	0.38 (9.7)	7.26 (184.4)
Average snowfall inches (cm)	4.7 (12)	0.9 (2.3)	0.4 (1.0)	0.3 (0.76)	0.0 (0.0)	0.0 (0.0)	0.0 (0.0)	0.0 (0.0)	0.0 (0.0)	0.1 (0.25)	0.5 (1.3)	4.2 (11)	11.1 (28.61)
Average precipitation days (≥ 0.01 in)	2.5	2.5	2.2	3.7	5.3	4.0	2.1	2.3	2.6	2.8	1.9	3.0	34.9
Average snowy days (≥ 0.1 in)	1.1	0.5	0.2	0.1	0.0	0.0	0.0	0.0	0.0	0.1	0.2	1.6	3.8
Source 1: NOAA
Source 2: National Weather Service
