= Victor, Idaho =

- City
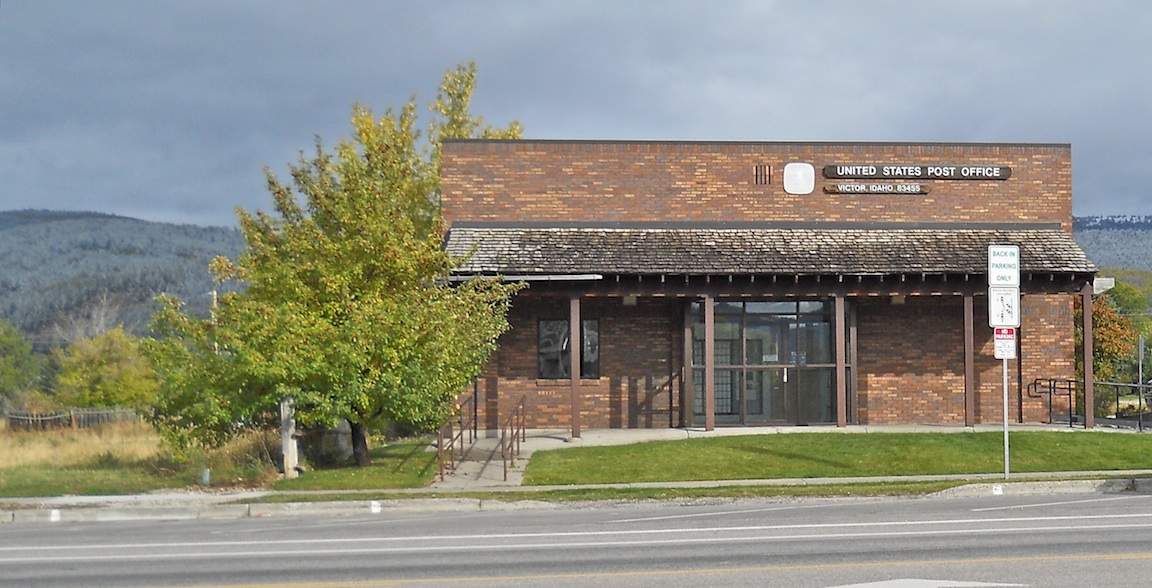
- Post Office at Victor, Idaho, United States
- Motto: "A Town to Come Home To"
- Location of Victor in Teton County, Idaho.
- Coordinates: 43°35′55″N 111°07′22″W
- Country: United States
- State: Idaho
- County: Teton

Government
  - Mayor: Sue Muncaster (interim)

Area
  - Total: 2.64 sq mi (6.85 km^{2})
- Elevation: 6,217 ft (1,895 m)

Population (2020)
  - Total: 2,157
  - Density: 946.2/sq mi (365.34/km^{2})
- Time zone: UTC-7 (Mountain (MST))
  - Summer (DST): UTC-6 (MDT)
- ZIP Code: 83455
- Area codes: 208, 986
- FIPS code: 16-84250
- GNIS feature ID: 2412154
- Website: victoridaho.gov

Victor is the largest city in Teton County, Idaho, United States. The population was 2,157 at the 2020 census, up from 1,928 in 2010, and 840 from 2000. It is part of the Jackson, WY–ID Micropolitan Statistical Area.

Nearby Teton Pass is accessed south from Victor on State Highway 33, which continues east of the state border as Wyoming Highway 22 to Jackson Hole.

== History ==
Victor was established in 1889 from four existing settlements, namely Trail Creek, Fox Creek, Chapin and Cedron. It was named for George Victor Sherwood, a dedicated mail carrier who delivered the mail despite threats of attacks.

== Geography ==
Victor is located at an elevation of 6,214 feet (1,894 m) above sea level.

According to the United States Census Bureau, the city has a total area of 2.65 square miles (6.86 km^{2}), all land. The zip code for Victor is 83455.

== Highways ==
- - SH-31
- - SH-33

== Demographics ==
Historical population
Census	Pop.	Note	%±
1920	277		—
1930	250		−9.7%
1940	294		17.6%
1950	431		46.6%
1960	240		−44.3%
1970	241		0.4%
1980	323		34.0%
1990	292		−9.6%
2000	840		187.7%
2010	1,928		129.5%
2020	2,157		11.9%
U.S. Decennial Census

=== 2020 census ===
As of the 2020 census, Victor had a population of 2,157. The median age was 33.0 years. 29.3% of residents were under the age of 18 and 5.6% of residents were 65 years of age or older. For every 100 females there were 111.7 males, and for every 100 females age 18 and over there were 108.9 males age 18 and over.

0.0% of residents lived in urban areas, while 100.0% lived in rural areas.

There were 814 households in Victor, of which 39.6% had children under the age of 18 living in them. Of all households, 51.2% were married-couple households, 22.1% were households with a male householder and no spouse or partner present, and 17.4% were households with a female householder and no spouse or partner present. About 24.6% of all households were made up of individuals and 5.7% had someone living alone who was 65 years of age or older.

There were 1,012 housing units, of which 19.6% were vacant. The homeowner vacancy rate was 7.0% and the rental vacancy rate was 17.3%.

Racial composition as of the 2020 census
Race	Number	Percent
White	1,589	73.7%
Black or African American	2	0.1%
American Indian and Alaska Native	18	0.8%
Asian	7	0.3%
Native Hawaiian and Other Pacific Islander	0	0.0%
Some other race	279	12.9%
Two or more races	262	12.1%
Hispanic or Latino (of any race)	559	25.9%

=== 2010 census ===
At the 2010 census there were 1,928 people in 683 households, including 433 families, in the city. The population density was 560.5 inhabitants per square mile (216.4/km^{2}). There were 853 housing units at an average density of 248.0 per square mile (95.8/km^{2}). The racial makeup of the city was 79.3% White, 0.5% Black (U.S. Census), 1.0% Native American, 0.5% Asian, 0.1% Pacific Islander, 16.9% from other races, and 1.9% from two or more races. Hispanic or Latino of any race were 22.6%.

Of the 683 households 41.9% had children under the age of 18 living with them, 53.7% were married couples living together, 6.1% had a female householder with no husband present, 3.5% had a male householder with no wife present, and 36.6% were non-families. 24.0% of households were one person and 4.1% were one person aged 65 or older. The average household size was 2.82 and the average family size was 3.51.

The median age was 30.6 years. 31.5% of residents were under the age of 18; 6.5% were between the ages of 18 and 24; 43.3% were from 25 to 44; 15.1% were from 45 to 64; and 3.7% were 65 or older. The gender makeup of the city was 52.4% male and 47.6% female.

=== 2000 census ===
At the 2000 census there were 840 people in 293 households, including 205 families, in the city. The population density was 648.5 inhabitants per square mile (250.4/km^{2}). There were 330 housing units at an average density of 254.8 per square mile (98.4/km^{2}). The racial makeup of the city was 91.31% White, 0.71% Black (U.S. Census), 1.55% Native American, 4.76% from other races, and 1.67% from two or more races. Hispanic or Latino of any race were 10.71%.

Of the 293 households 39.6% had children under the age of 18 living with them, 57.3% were married couples living together, 7.5% had a female householder with no husband present, and 29.7% were non-families. 22.2% of households were one person and 6.5% were one person aged 65 or older. The average household size was 2.87 and the average family size was 3.43.

The age distribution was 31.5% under the age of 18, 6.9% from 18 to 24, 37.5% from 25 to 44, 16.3% from 45 to 64, and 7.7% 65 or older. The median age was 31 years. For every 100 females, there were 105.9 males. For every 100 females age 18 and over, there were 104.6 males.

The median household income was $42,500 and the median family income was $49,750. Males had a median income of $37,159 versus $25,250 for females. The per capita income for the city was $16,740. About 7.0% of families and 8.4% of the population were below the poverty line, including 11.2% of those under age 18 and 7.0% of those age 65 or over.

== Climate ==
According to the Köppen climate classification, Victor has a warm-summer humid continental climate (Dfb).

Climate data for Victor, 1991–2020 interpolated normals (6230 ft elevation)
Month	Jan	Feb	Mar	Apr	May	Jun	Jul	Aug	Sep	Oct	Nov	Dec	Year
Mean daily maximum °F (°C)	28.4 (−2.0)	32.4 (0.2)	41.0 (5.0)	50.7 (10.4)	60.8 (16.0)	70.2 (21.2)	80.8 (27.1)	80.1 (26.7)	70.0 (21.1)	55.0 (12.8)	39.4 (4.1)	28.8 (−1.8)	53.1 (11.7)
Daily mean °F (°C)	18.7 (−7.4)	21.6 (−5.8)	29.8 (−1.2)	38.5 (3.6)	47.5 (8.6)	55.4 (13.0)	63.5 (17.5)	62.4 (16.9)	53.8 (12.1)	41.9 (5.5)	29.1 (−1.6)	19.4 (−7.0)	40.1 (4.5)
Mean daily minimum °F (°C)	8.8 (−12.9)	10.9 (−11.7)	18.9 (−7.3)	26.4 (−3.1)	34.2 (1.2)	40.6 (4.8)	46.4 (8.0)	44.8 (7.1)	37.6 (3.1)	28.8 (−1.8)	18.7 (−7.4)	9.9 (−12.3)	27.2 (−2.7)
Average precipitation inches (mm)	2.95 (75.00)	2.16 (54.74)	2.36 (59.84)	2.47 (62.86)	2.77 (70.32)	2.07 (52.66)	1.12 (28.50)	1.38 (35.02)	1.69 (43.01)	2.10 (53.40)	2.40 (60.85)	2.83 (72.00)	26.3 (668.2)
Average dew point °F (°C)	13.3 (−10.4)	14.9 (−9.5)	20.5 (−6.4)	24.6 (−4.1)	31.1 (−0.5)	37.4 (3.0)	40.5 (4.7)	38.1 (3.4)	32.4 (0.2)	26.4 (−3.1)	20.1 (−6.6)	13.8 (−10.1)	26.1 (−3.3)
Source: Prism Climate Group

== Education ==
The public schools in the county are operated by Teton School District #401, headquartered in Driggs. The only traditional high school is Teton High School, also in Driggs. A lower elementary school (K–3) is in Victor, but the district's upper elementary (4–5) and middle school (6–8) are located in Driggs.

College of Eastern Idaho includes this county in its catchment zone; however this county is not in its taxation zone.

== Notable people ==
- Breezy Johnson, Olympic Gold Medalist and World Champion alpine skier
- Amanda Otto, dog musher and sled dog racer
