= Snake River Aquifer =

Ground water reservoir in Idaho, USA

Coordinates: 42°48′N 114°00′W

The Snake River Aquifer is a large reservoir of groundwater underlying the Snake River Plain in the southern part of the U.S. state of Idaho. Most of the water in the aquifer comes from irrigation recharge. Measuring about 400 miles (640 km) from east to west, it is an important water source for agricultural irrigation in the Plain. The Snake River Aquifer is commonly defined as two separate parts, separated by Salmon Falls Creek: the Eastern Snake River Plain Aquifer and Western Snake River Plain Aquifer.

== Eastern Snake River Plain Aquifer ==
The Eastern Snake River Plain Aquifer north of the Snake River is a remarkable aquifer of great resource and economic significance. It is not a single homogeneous geologic formation. Rather it consists of a volcanic pile of the Quaternary Snake River Group basalts. In eastern Idaho, these basalts may be about 1 mile (1.6 km) thick. The individual flows are 20–30 feet (6–9 m) thick with the upper 3–6 feet (1–2 m) consisting of a very permeable rubble zone. Interbedded alluvial sediments are also found between many of the flows.

In the eastern Snake River Plain, the Snake River lies near the southern edge of the plain, about 40–50 miles (64–80 km) southeast of the ranges of central Idaho. The rivers in the ranges north of the plain all disappear into the surface of the Snake River Plain near the mountain front. The Little Lost River is a typical example. For about 100 miles downstream from Milner Dam in the vicinity of Twin Falls an estimated total volume of approximately 200 billion cubic feet (5.7 km^{3}; 1.4 cu mi) of water enter the Snake River from gigantic springs on the north side of the canyon. This is the well-known Thousand Springs area.

Groundwater flows to the southwest through the Snake River Plains aquifer which is consistent with the overall tilt to the southwest of the basalt strata. The channel of the Snake River cuts through the aquifer. Consequently, the gravity and weight of the water in the basalt layers north of the river drives the huge springs.
