= Arco, Idaho =

- City
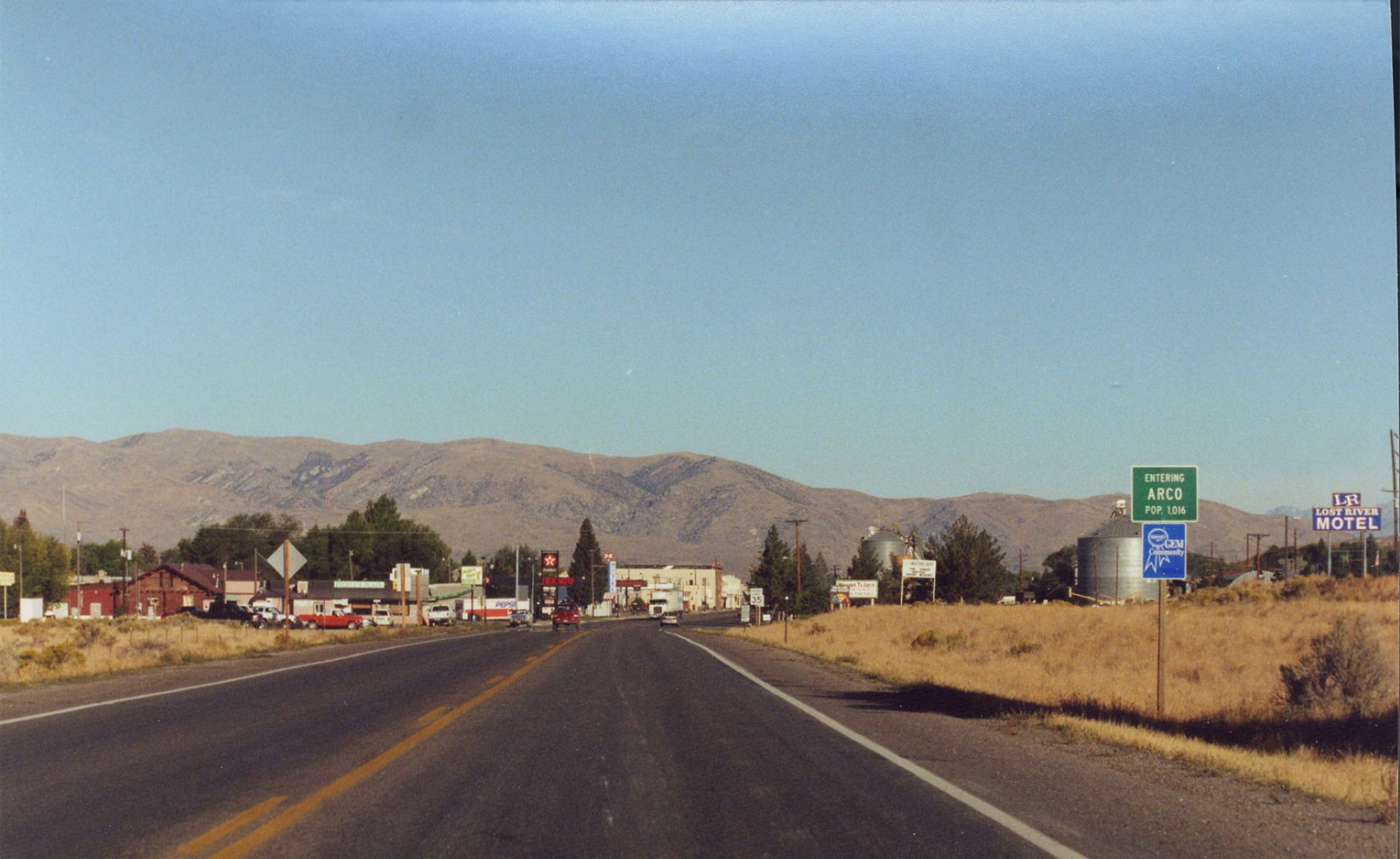
- Nickname: Atomic City
- Location of Arco in Butte County, Idaho.

- Location in the United States
- Coordinates: 43°37′33″N 113°18′06″W
- Country: United States
- State: Idaho
- County: Butte
- Established: July 17, 1955

Area
  - Total: 1.08 sq mi (2.80 km^{2})
  - Land: 1.07 sq mi (2.77 km^{2})
  - Water: 0.012 sq mi (0.03 km^{2})
- Elevation: 5,309 ft (1,618 m)

Population (2020)
  - Total: 879
  - Density: 822/sq mi (317/km^{2})
- Time zone: UTC-7 (Mountain (MST))
  - Summer (DST): UTC-6 (MDT)
- ZIP code: 83213
- Area codes: 208, 986
- FIPS code: 16-03160
- GNIS feature ID: 2409725
- Website: cityofarco.municipalimpact.com

Arco is a city in Butte County, Idaho, United States. The population was 879 as of the 2020 United States census, down from 995 at the 2010 census. Arco is the county seat and largest city in Butte County.

== History ==
Arco was named as early as 1860 based on the name of a local rancher, Louis Arco. Louis Arco is also mentioned in the National Park Service’s Teacher's Guide to Craters of the Moon with the line “[around] 1862 Louis Arco establishe[d] a ranch and trading post at Arco."

Arco was the first community in the world ever to be lit by electricity generated solely by nuclear power. This occurred for about an hour on July 17, 1955, powered by Argonne National Laboratory’s BORAX-III reactor at the nearby National Reactor Testing Station (NRTS), now the Idaho National Laboratory. NRTS made further history on January 3, 1961, when the SL-1 reactor was destroyed through an operator maintenance error, with the ensuing steam explosion causing the deaths of all three personnel present. It was the world's first and the United States' only fatal reactor accident.

== Economy ==
The town's economic base is primarily derived from the Idaho National Laboratory (formerly the Idaho National Engineering Laboratory or INEL), agricultural products, and recreation in the Lost River Valley.

== Highways ==
- US 20 — to Mountain Home (west) and Idaho Falls (east)
- US 26 — to Shoshone (west) and Blackfoot (east)
- US 93 — to Challis (north) and Twin Falls (south)

== Geography ==
Arco is located along the Big Lost River and is a gateway to the Lost River Range from the Snake River Plain. Craters of the Moon National Monument is located along U.S. Route 20, southwest of the city. The Idaho National Laboratory (INL) is located east of Arco.

Arco Peak, located two mile north of the community at an elevation of 7547 feet, rises 2220 feet above the city.

According to the United States Census Bureau, the city has a total area of 1.07 square miles (2.77 km^{2}), of which, 1.06 square miles (2.75 km^{2}) is land and 0.01 square miles (0.03 km^{2}) is water.

In town, the most striking physical feature is Number Hill, a rocky hill with numbers painted all over it. Butte County High School has a tradition of each class since 1920 painting its graduation year on the face of hill.

=== Climate ===
Climate data for Arco, Idaho, 1991–2020 normals, extremes 1914–present
Month	Jan	Feb	Mar	Apr	May	Jun	Jul	Aug	Sep	Oct	Nov	Dec	Year
Record high °F (°C)	52 (11)	59 (15)	71 (22)	87 (31)	95 (35)	97 (36)	102 (39)	100 (38)	100 (38)	85 (29)	70 (21)	59 (15)	102 (39)
Mean maximum °F (°C)	41.9 (5.5)	45.4 (7.4)	59.8 (15.4)	71.6 (22.0)	81.4 (27.4)	89.0 (31.7)	94.9 (34.9)	93.1 (33.9)	87.2 (30.7)	75.4 (24.1)	58.0 (14.4)	45.2 (7.3)	95.8 (35.4)
Mean daily maximum °F (°C)	30.3 (−0.9)	34.7 (1.5)	45.9 (7.7)	57.2 (14.0)	67.0 (19.4)	76.4 (24.7)	86.6 (30.3)	84.8 (29.3)	74.9 (23.8)	59.5 (15.3)	42.6 (5.9)	31.2 (−0.4)	57.6 (14.2)
Daily mean °F (°C)	18.6 (−7.4)	23.2 (−4.9)	34.4 (1.3)	43.8 (6.6)	52.8 (11.6)	61.0 (16.1)	69.1 (20.6)	67.2 (19.6)	57.9 (14.4)	45.0 (7.2)	30.8 (−0.7)	20.3 (−6.5)	43.7 (6.5)
Mean daily minimum °F (°C)	7.0 (−13.9)	11.7 (−11.3)	22.8 (−5.1)	30.4 (−0.9)	38.6 (3.7)	45.7 (7.6)	51.6 (10.9)	49.5 (9.7)	41.0 (5.0)	30.5 (−0.8)	19.1 (−7.2)	9.3 (−12.6)	29.8 (−1.2)
Mean minimum °F (°C)	−12.0 (−24.4)	−7.3 (−21.8)	6.3 (−14.3)	18.2 (−7.7)	25.5 (−3.6)	33.4 (0.8)	42.3 (5.7)	39.1 (3.9)	28.4 (−2.0)	16.1 (−8.8)	2.8 (−16.2)	−8.7 (−22.6)	−15.8 (−26.6)
Record low °F (°C)	−46 (−43)	−32 (−36)	−20 (−29)	−3 (−19)	11 (−12)	20 (−7)	29 (−2)	25 (−4)	11 (−12)	1 (−17)	−22 (−30)	−45 (−43)	−46 (−43)
Average precipitation inches (mm)	0.67 (17)	0.62 (16)	0.68 (17)	0.86 (22)	1.20 (30)	1.13 (29)	0.32 (8.1)	0.54 (14)	0.66 (17)	0.71 (18)	0.55 (14)	0.86 (22)	8.80 (224)
Average snowfall inches (cm)	7.0 (18)	4.6 (12)	1.1 (2.8)	1.3 (3.3)	0.2 (0.51)	0.0 (0.0)	0.0 (0.0)	0.0 (0.0)	0.0 (0.0)	0.3 (0.76)	1.2 (3.0)	8.1 (21)	23.8 (61.37)
Average precipitation days (≥ 0.01 in)	4.4	3.7	3.9	4.8	6.0	3.9	2.2	3.0	3.6	3.7	3.4	5.1	47.7
Average snowy days (≥ 0.1 in)	2.7	1.5	0.8	0.6	0.2	0.0	0.0	0.0	0.0	0.0	0.9	2.5	9.2
Source 1: NOAA
Source 2: National Weather Service

== Demographics ==
Historical population
Census	Pop.	Note	%±
1910	322		—
1920	737		128.9%
1930	572		−22.4%
1940	548		−4.2%
1950	961		75.4%
1960	1,562		62.5%
1970	1,244		−20.4%
1980	1,241		−0.2%
1990	1,016		−18.1%
2000	1,026		1.0%
2010	995		−3.0%
2020	879		−11.7%
U.S. Decennial Census

=== 2010 census ===
As of the 2010 United States census of 2010, there were 995 people, 417 households, and 254 families living in the city. The population density was 938.7 inhabitants per square mile (362.4/km^{2}). There were 504 housing units at an average density of 475.5 per square mile (183.6/km^{2}). The racial makeup of the city was 95.1% White, 0.3% Native American, 0.3% Asian, 1.7% from other races, and 2.6% from two or more races. Hispanic or Latino of any race were 3.0% of the population.

There were 417 households, of which 30.2% had children under the age of 18 living with them, 44.4% were married couples living together, 13.2% had a female householder with no husband present, 3.4% had a male householder with no wife present, and 39.1% were non-families. 34.1% of all households were made up of individuals, and 15.9% had someone living alone who was 65 years of age or older. The average household size was 2.35 and the average family size was 3.03.

The median age in the city was 41.2 years. 26.9% of residents were under the age of 18; 6.1% were between the ages of 18 and 24; 21.6% were from 25 to 44; 26.1% were from 45 to 64; and 18.9% were 65 years of age or older. The gender makeup of the city was 51.8% male and 48.2% female.

=== 2000 census ===
As of the 2000 United States census of 2000, there were 1,026 people, 427 households, and 269 families living in the city. The population density was 1,163.9 inhabitants per square mile (449.4/km^{2}). There were 505 housing units at an average density of 572.9 per square mile (221.2/km^{2}). The racial makeup of the city was 95.13% White, 0.49% African American, 1.36% Native American, 1.75% from other races, and 1.27% from two or more races. Hispanic or Latino of any race were 3.61% of the population.

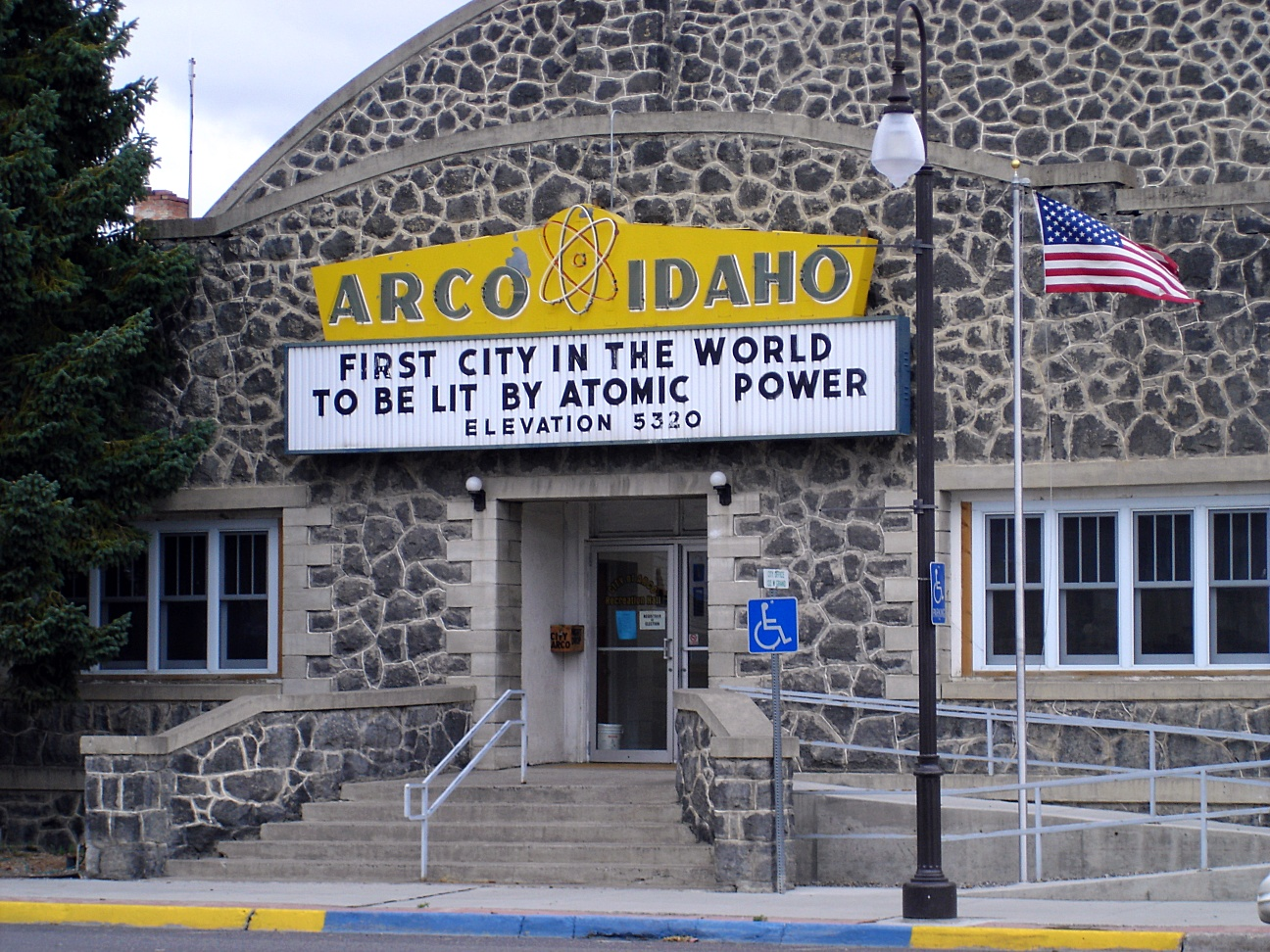
City office / Recreation Hall on Main Street in Arco

There were 427 households, out of which 29.3% had children under the age of 18 living with them, 48.2% were married couples living together, 11.9% had a female householder with no husband present, and 37.0% were non-families. 34.0% of all households were made up of individuals, and 15.2% had someone living alone who was 65 years of age or older. The average household size was 2.35 and the average family size was 3.04.

In the city, the population was spread out, with 27.9% under the age of 18, 6.8% from 18 to 24, 22.4% from 25 to 44, 25.8% from 45 to 64, and 17.1% who were 65 years of age or older. The median age was 40 years. For every 100 females, there were 91.8 males. For every 100 females age 18 and over, there were 90.7 males.

The median income for a household in the city was $27,993, and the median income for a family was $34,688. Males had a median income of $34,688 versus $17,386 for females. The per capita income for the city was $14,744. About 19.6% of families and 22.6% of the population were below the poverty line, including 33.8% of those under age 18 and 15.8% of those age 65 or over.

== Notable people ==
- C. A. Bottolfsen, governor of Idaho
- Warren Jones, justice of the Idaho Supreme Court

== See also ==
Atomic power neon sign at night. City of Arco Recreation Hall

- Idaho National Laboratory
- Borah Peak
- Lost River Range
- Big Lost River
- Salmon-Challis National Forest
- Snake River Plain
- Craters of the Moon National Monument and Preserve
- Big Southern Butte
- Blizzard Mountain Ski Area
- Butte County High School
