= Tetonia, Idaho =

- City
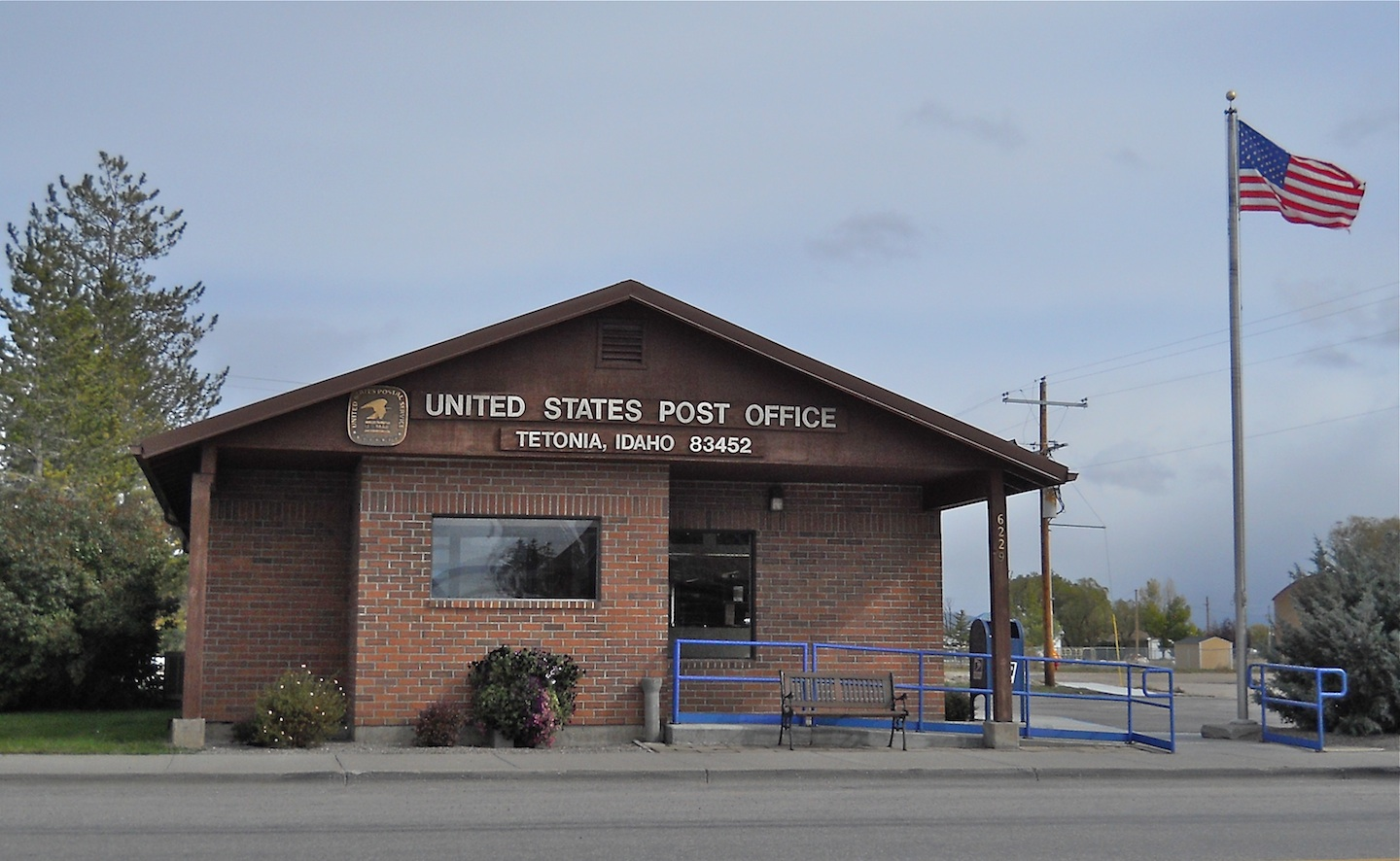
- Tetonia Post Office, October 2013

- Location of Tetonia in Teton County, Idaho.
- Coordinates: 43°48′52″N 111°09′31″W
- Country: United States
- State: Idaho
- County: Teton

Area
  - Total: 0.57 sq mi (1.47 km^{2})
  - Land: 0.57 sq mi (1.47 km^{2})
  - Water: 0 sq mi (0.00 km^{2})
- Elevation: 6,067 ft (1,849 m)

Population (2020)
  - Total: 308
  - Estimate (2019): 288
  - Density: 506.6/sq mi (195.61/km^{2})
- Time zone: UTC-7 (Mountain (MST))
  - Summer (DST): UTC-6 (MDT)
- ZIP codes: 83424, 83452
- Area codes: 208, 986
- FIPS code: 16-80470
- GNIS feature ID: 2412053
- Website: tetoniaidaho.com

Tetonia is a city in Teton County, Idaho, United States, about 50 miles (80 km) northeast of Idaho Falls, Idaho (center to center) and about 425 miles (684 km) northwest of Denver, Colorado. As of the 2020 census, Tetonia had a population of 308.

== Geography ==
According to the United States Census Bureau, the city has a total area of 0.57 square miles (1.48 km^{2}), all land. Tetonia is located at 43°48′50″N 111°9′35″W, in Teton County Idaho.

== Climate ==
According to the Köppen Climate Classification system, Tetonia has a warm-summer humid continental climate, abbreviated "Dfb" on climate maps. The hottest temperature recorded in Tetonia was 98 °F (36.7 °C) on July 15, 1955, while the coldest temperature recorded was −57 °F (−49.4 °C) on February 9, 1933.

Climate data for Tetonia, Idaho, 1991–2020 normals, extremes 1952–present
Month	Jan	Feb	Mar	Apr	May	Jun	Jul	Aug	Sep	Oct	Nov	Dec	Year
Record high °F (°C)	59 (15)	60 (16)	66 (19)	79 (26)	88 (31)	91 (33)	98 (37)	97 (36)	93 (34)	83 (28)	67 (19)	57 (14)	98 (37)
Mean maximum °F (°C)	40.8 (4.9)	43.9 (6.6)	53.5 (11.9)	67.1 (19.5)	75.8 (24.3)	83.4 (28.6)	88.1 (31.2)	87.6 (30.9)	84.0 (28.9)	73.7 (23.2)	56.9 (13.8)	43.8 (6.6)	89.1 (31.7)
Mean daily maximum °F (°C)	26.8 (−2.9)	30.7 (−0.7)	39.2 (4.0)	49.1 (9.5)	60.2 (15.7)	68.7 (20.4)	78.1 (25.6)	78.2 (25.7)	68.8 (20.4)	54.0 (12.2)	38.1 (3.4)	26.9 (−2.8)	51.6 (10.9)
Daily mean °F (°C)	17.5 (−8.1)	20.7 (−6.3)	29.1 (−1.6)	38.0 (3.3)	47.4 (8.6)	54.7 (12.6)	62.6 (17.0)	61.8 (16.6)	53.3 (11.8)	40.8 (4.9)	28.4 (−2.0)	18.1 (−7.7)	39.4 (4.1)
Mean daily minimum °F (°C)	8.2 (−13.2)	10.7 (−11.8)	19.0 (−7.2)	26.9 (−2.8)	34.7 (1.5)	40.7 (4.8)	47.1 (8.4)	45.4 (7.4)	37.7 (3.2)	27.6 (−2.4)	18.7 (−7.4)	9.3 (−12.6)	27.2 (−2.7)
Mean minimum °F (°C)	−14.8 (−26.0)	−10.7 (−23.7)	−0.9 (−18.3)	12.5 (−10.8)	22.4 (−5.3)	30.0 (−1.1)	36.8 (2.7)	34.1 (1.2)	24.3 (−4.3)	11.6 (−11.3)	−1.4 (−18.6)	−13.1 (−25.1)	−19.7 (−28.7)
Record low °F (°C)	−39 (−39)	−57 (−49)	−20 (−29)	−7 (−22)	7 (−14)	19 (−7)	28 (−2)	22 (−6)	6 (−14)	−8 (−22)	−23 (−31)	−45 (−43)	−57 (−49)
Average precipitation inches (mm)	2.03 (52)	1.16 (29)	1.56 (40)	1.78 (45)	2.30 (58)	1.69 (43)	0.88 (22)	1.19 (30)	1.50 (38)	1.61 (41)	1.19 (30)	2.07 (53)	18.96 (481)
Average precipitation days (≥ 0.01 in)	10.8	8.3	7.3	9.0	10.0	8.1	5.0	5.7	5.7	7.2	8.3	10.8	96.2
Source 1: NOAA
Source 2: National Weather Service

== History ==
Tetonia was established as an agricultural town in the late 19th century, taking its name from the nearby Teton Range. Many of the businesses previously operating in Haden relocated to Tetonia following the arrival of the Union Pacific railroad.

== Demographics ==
Historical population
Census	Pop.	Note	%±
1950	232		—
1960	194		−16.4%
1970	176		−9.3%
1980	191		8.5%
1990	132		−30.9%
2000	247		87.1%
2010	269		8.9%
2020	308		14.5%
2019 (est.)	288		7.1%
U.S. Decennial Census

=== 2010 census ===
As of the census of 2010, there were 269 people, 95 households, and 62 families residing in the city. The population density was 471.9 inhabitants per square mile (182.2/km^{2}). There were 122 housing units at an average density of 214.0 per square mile (82.6/km^{2}). The racial makeup of the city was 92.2% White, 0.7% Native American, 6.3% from other races, and 0.7% from two or more races. Hispanic or Latino of any race were 10.8% of the population.

There were 95 households, of which 46.3% had children under the age of 18 living with them, 49.5% were married couples living together, 11.6% had a female householder with no husband present, 4.2% had a male householder with no wife present, and 34.7% were non-families. 28.4% of all households were made up of individuals, and 10.5% had someone living alone who was 65 years of age or older. The average household size was 2.83 and the average family size was 3.61.

The median age in the city was 35.1 years. 36.1% of residents were under the age of 18; 5.1% were between the ages of 18 and 24; 26.7% were from 25 to 44; 24.5% were from 45 to 64; and 7.4% were 65 years of age or older. The gender makeup of the city was 48.7% male and 51.3% female.

== Education ==
Teton County School District #401 is the single school district in the county. Teton High School is the county's sole comprehensive high school.

College of Eastern Idaho includes this county in its catchment zone; however this county is not in its taxation zone.

== Gallery ==
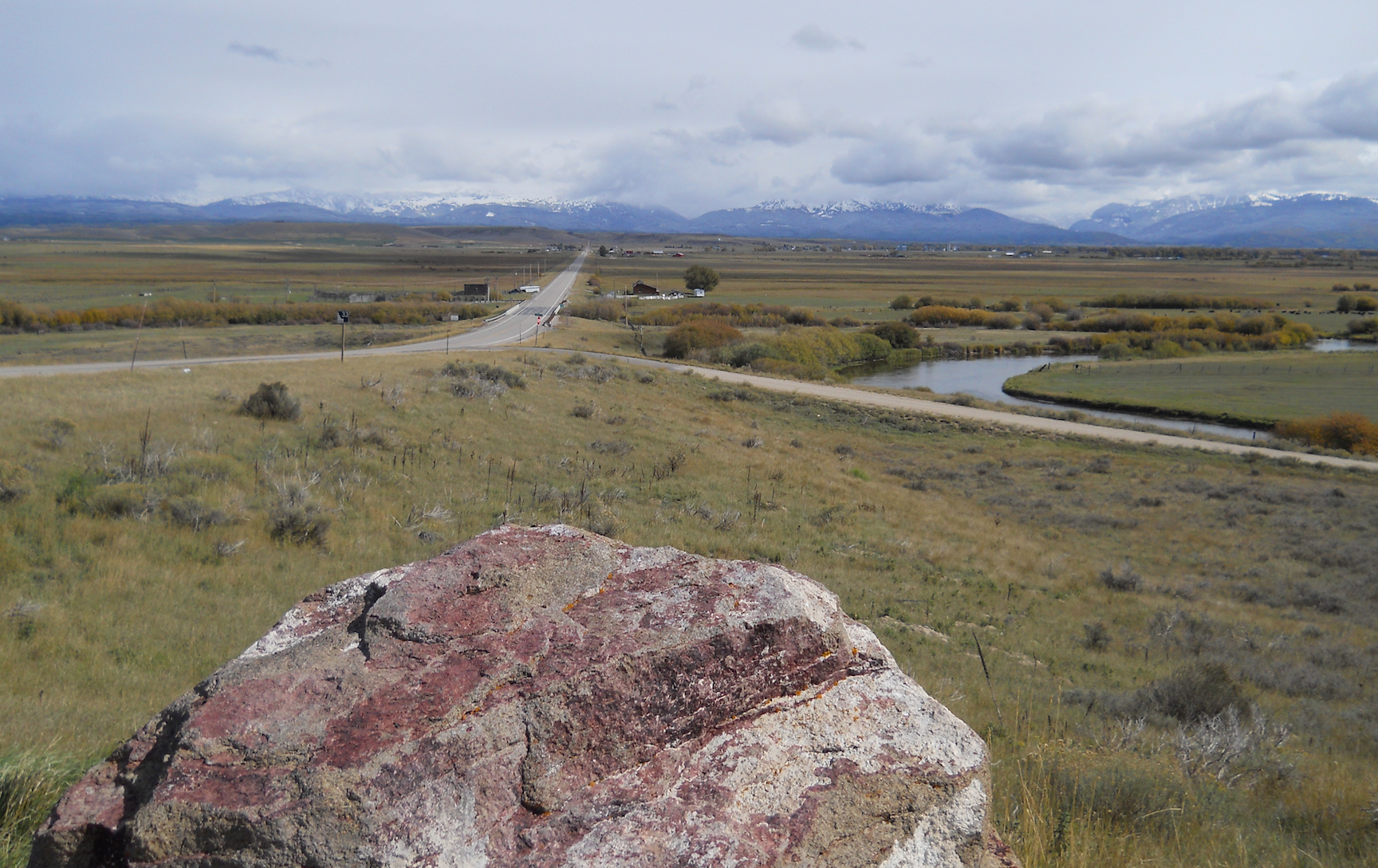
Teton Valley Idaho, USA

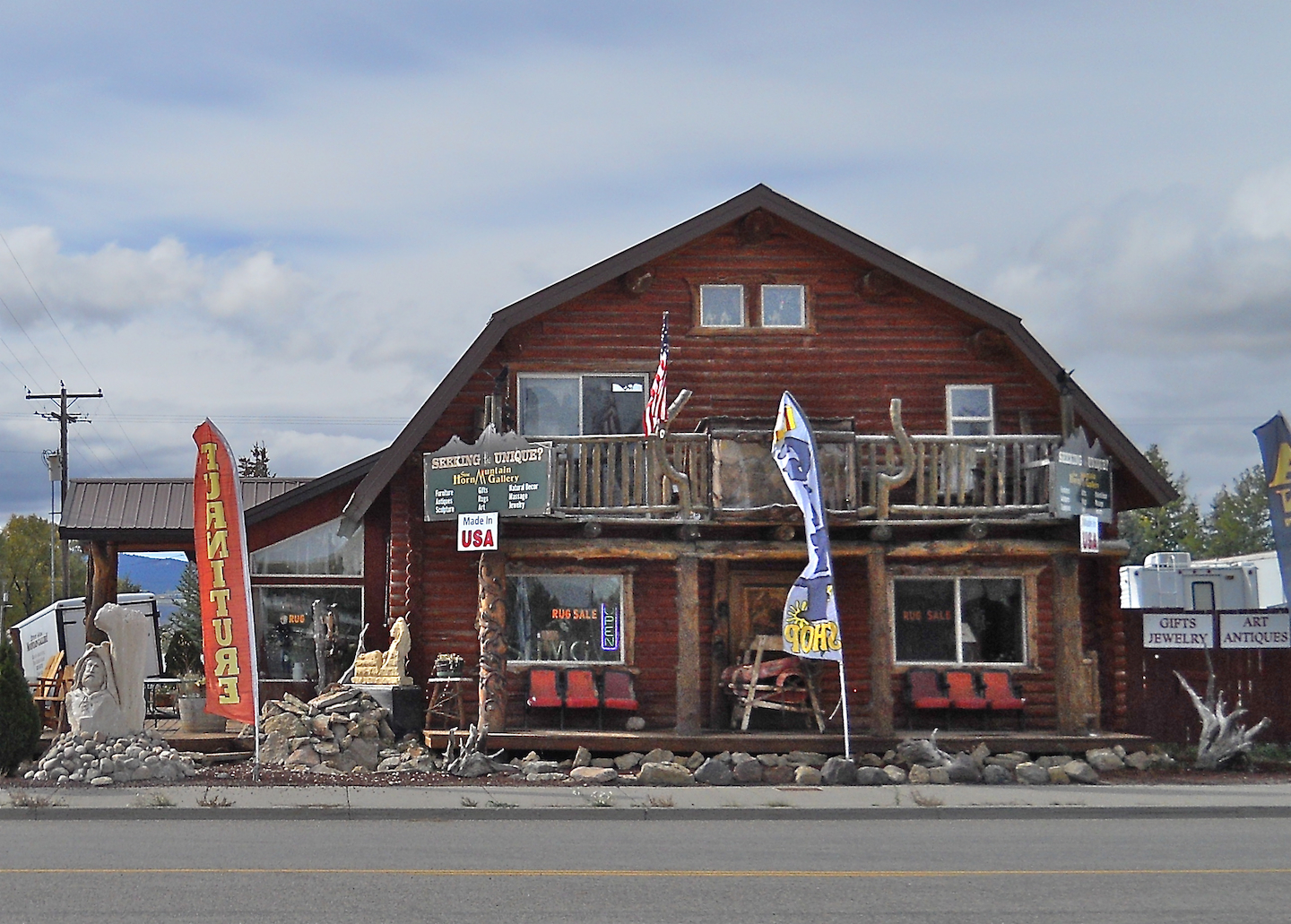
Tetonia Idaho Store 1

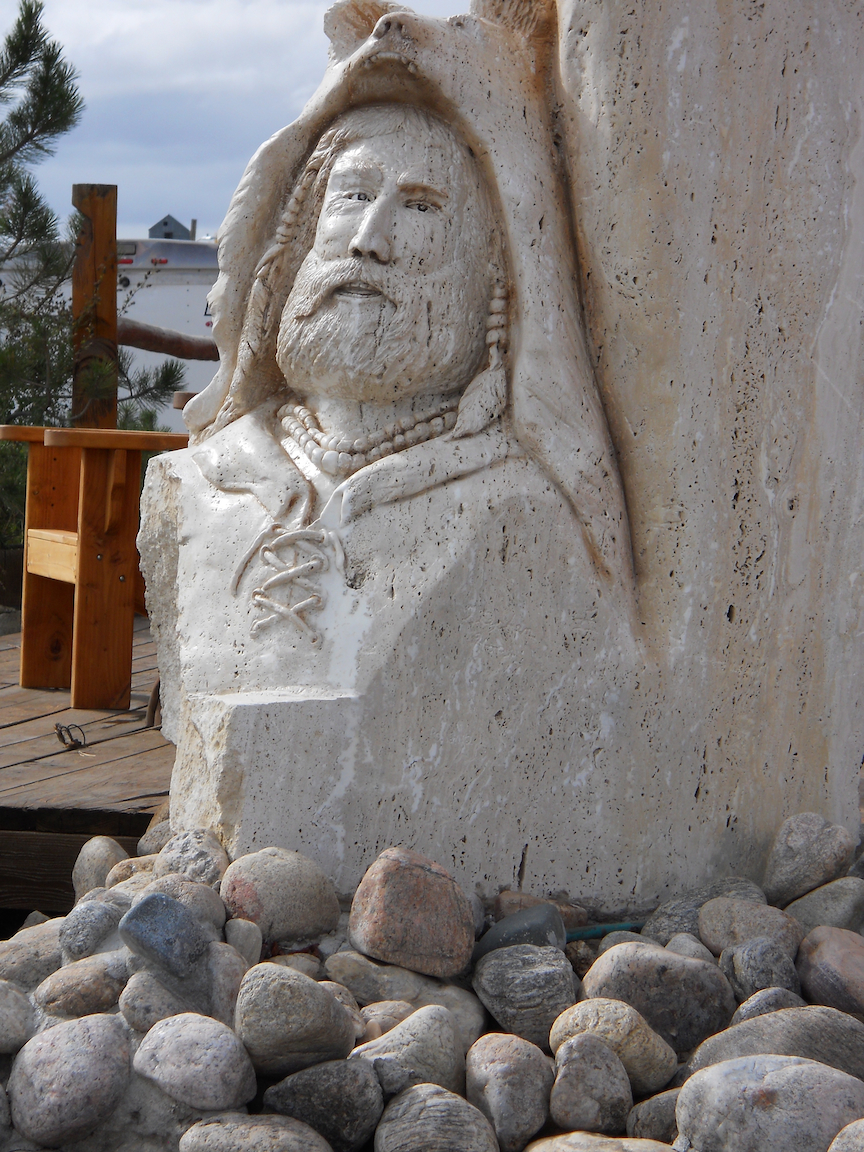
Tetonia Idaho Store Sculpture

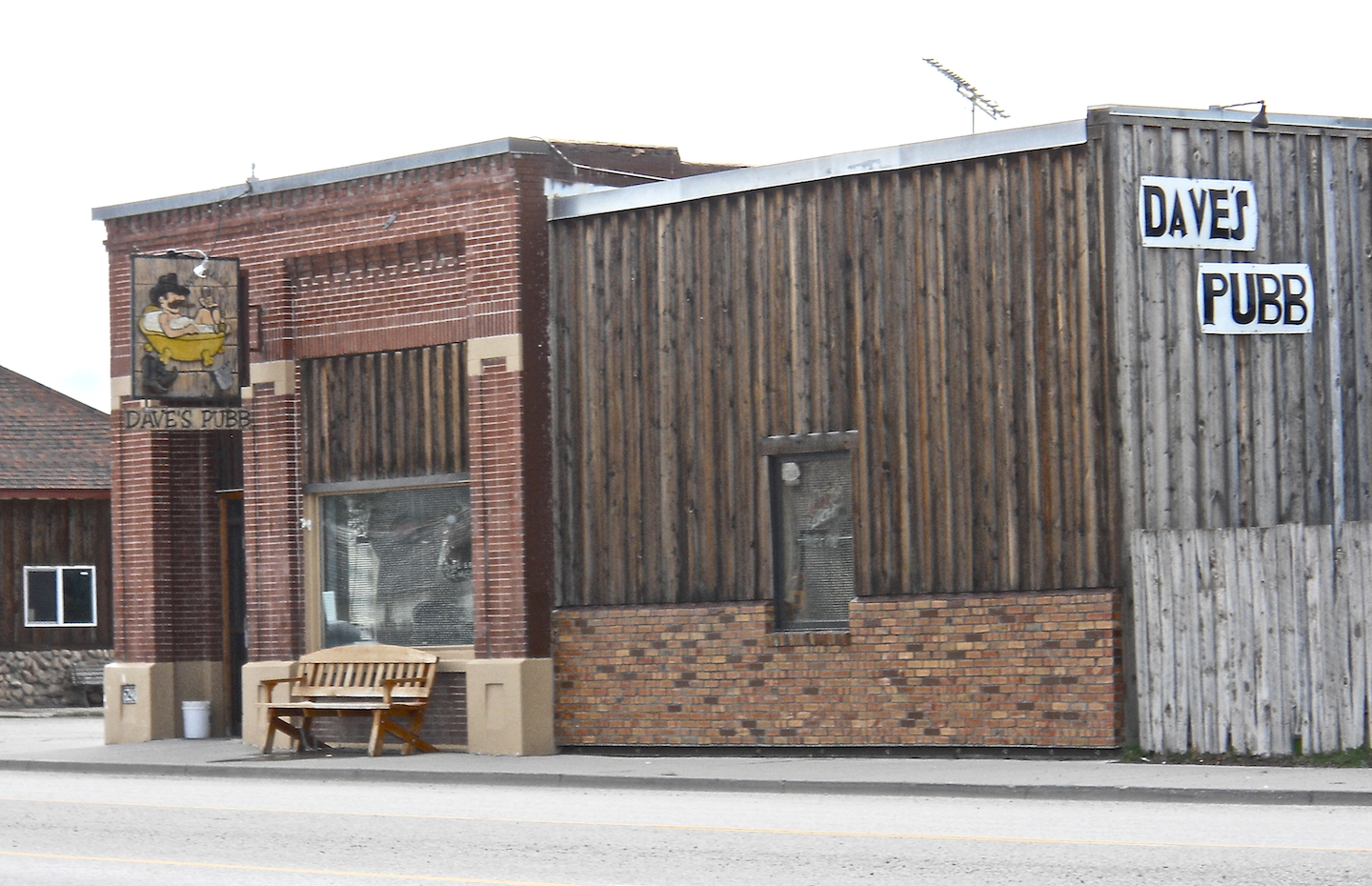
Tetonia Idaho Store 2

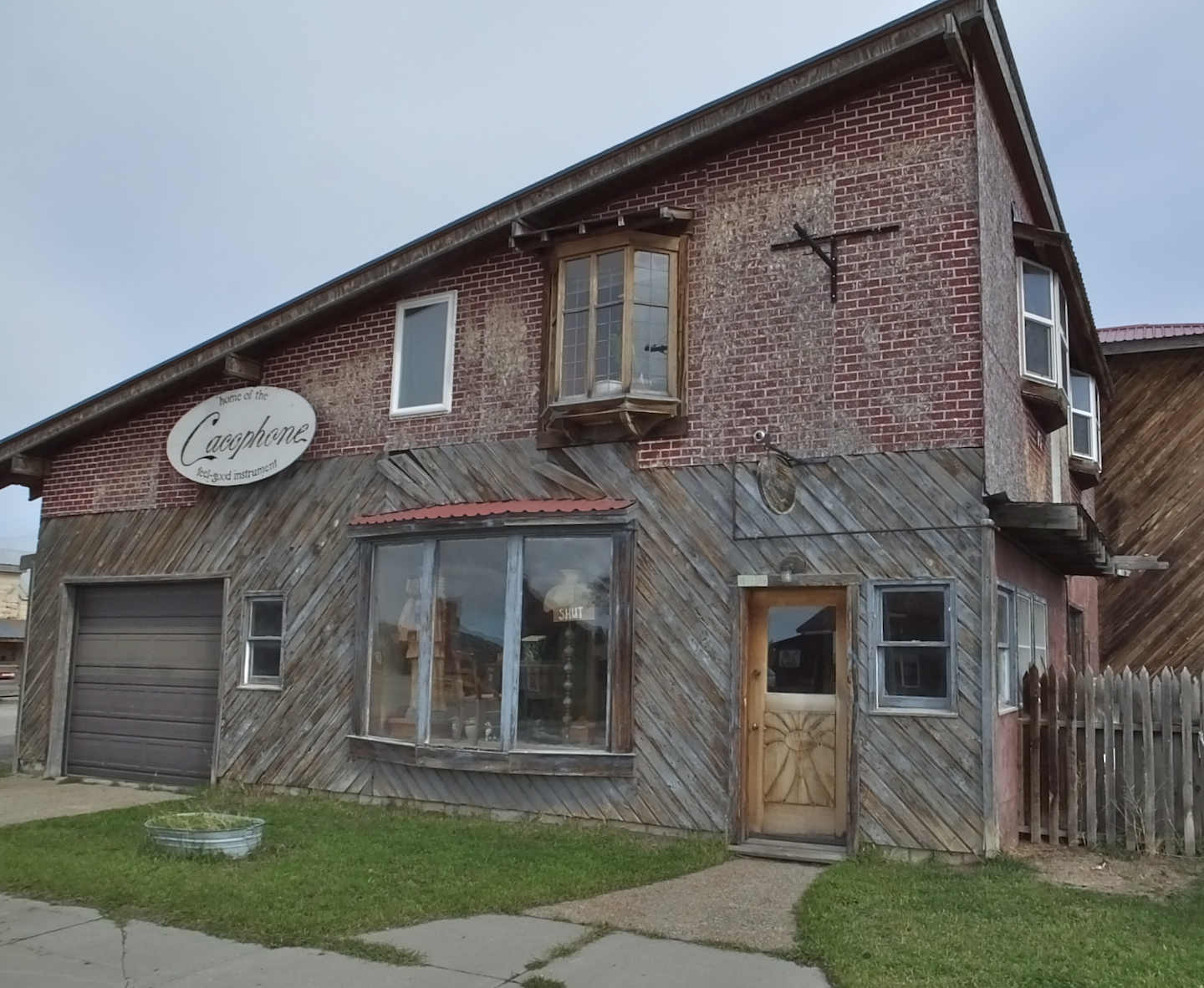
Store in Tetonia Idaho

== See also ==
- List of cities in Idaho
