= Butte County, Idaho =

County in Idaho, United States

- County
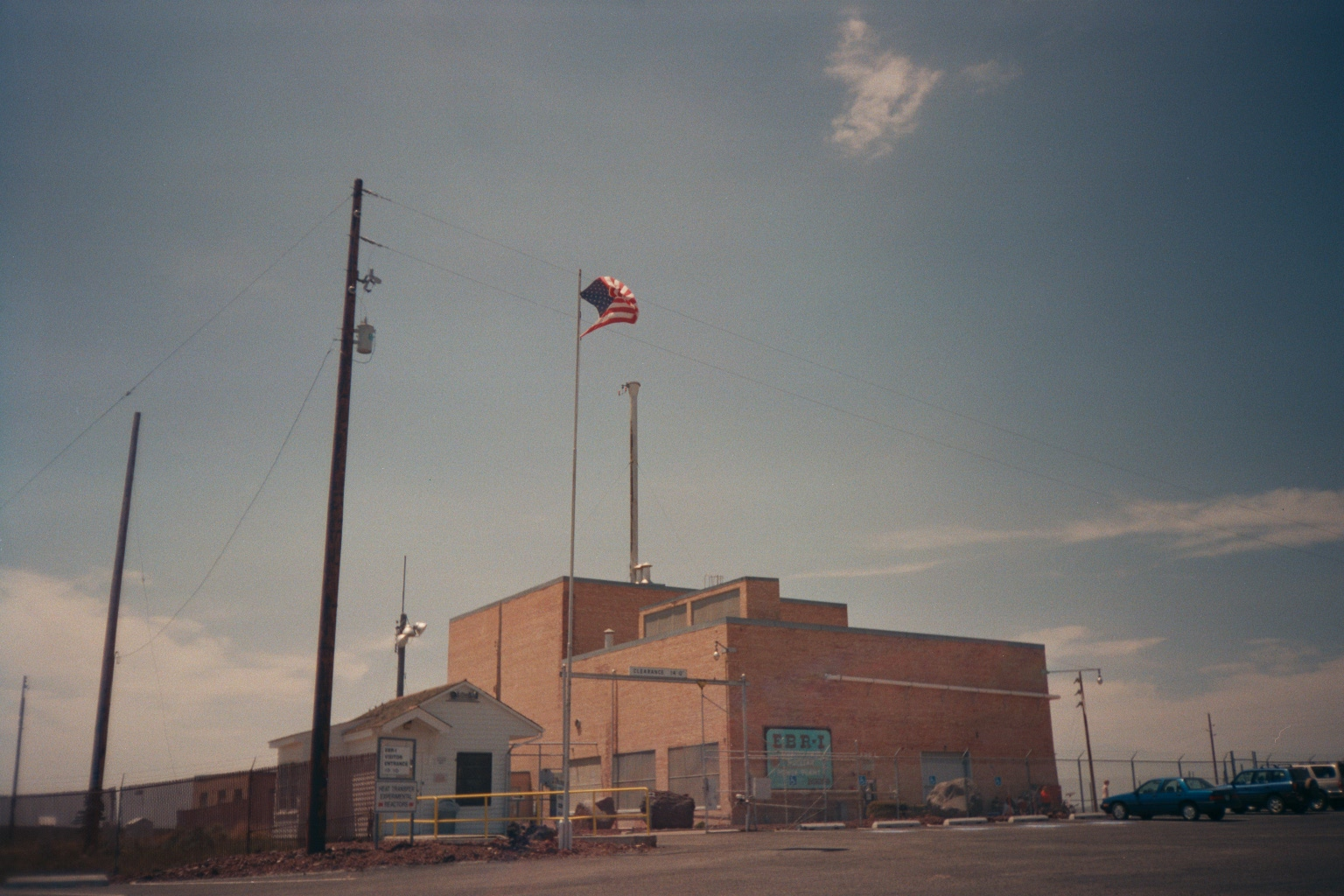
- Experimental Breeder Reactor I

- Seal

- Location within the U.S. state of Idaho
- Coordinates: 43°43′N 113°10′W
- Country: United States
- State: Idaho
- Founded: February 6, 1917
- Named for: Big Southern Butte
- Seat: Arco
- Largest city: Arco

Area
  - Total: 2,234 sq mi (5,790 km^{2})
  - Land: 2,232 sq mi (5,780 km^{2})
  - Water: 2.0 sq mi (5.2 km^{2}) 0.1%

Population (2020)
  - Total: 2,574
  - Estimate (2025): 2,783 ▲
  - Density: 1.3/sq mi (0.50/km^{2})
- Time zone: UTC−7 (Mountain)
  - Summer (DST): UTC−6 (MDT)
- Congressional district: 2nd
- Website: https://buttecountyid.us/

Butte County is a rural county located in the U.S. state of Idaho. As of the 2020 census, the population was 2,574, making it the third-least populous county in Idaho. Its county seat and largest city is Arco. The county was established in 1917 from parts of Bingham, Blaine, and Jefferson counties. The county gained territory in the Clyde area from Custer County in 1937 to reach its present boundary.

== History ==
The first settlement in Butte County occurred about four miles (6 km) south of the present town site of Arco in 1878. The settlement was then known by the names of Kennedy Crossing and Lower Crossing of the Lost River and was located in eastern Alturas County. Once the post office was established in 1879, the settlement became known as Arco.

The ghost town of Era was settled in 1885. Settlement of Antelope, Martin and Island (now Moore) also occurred prior to 1890. Alturas County established precincts for all five Butte County settlements existing at the 1890 census, containing a combined population of 389. The settlements became part of Blaine County in 1895. Blaine County created precincts for all of the settlements except Martin and added a precinct for Clyde. At the 1900 census, the five precincts totaled 714 residents, increasing to 1787 in 1910. Construction of a railroad from Blackfoot to Mackay resulted in relocation of the town of Arco to its present site in 1901.

Butte County was established on February 6, 1917, with Arco as its county seat. Butte County included parts of Blain, Jefferson, and Bingham counties, and was named for the three Snake River Plain buttes that served as landmarks to trappers and pioneers traveling the area, Big Southern Butte, Middle Butte, and East Butte.

Butte County is included in the Idaho Falls metropolitan area. Much of the eastern part of the county is the vast Idaho National Laboratory, which extends eastward into neighboring counties.

== Geography ==
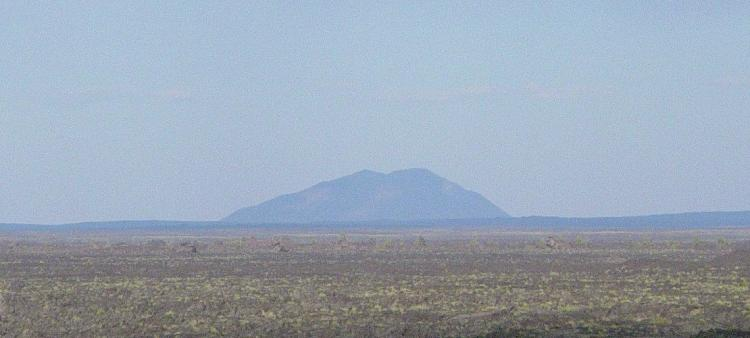
Big Southern Butte was used as a landmark by pioneers.

According to the U.S. Census Bureau, the county has a total area of 2,234 square miles (5,790 km^{2}), of which 2,232 square miles (5,780 km^{2}) is land and 2.0 square miles (5.2 km^{2}) (0.1%) is water.

The Little Lost River is located in Butte County. Its waters, along with the Big Lost River, disappear from the surface to flow underground into the Snake River Plain aquifer in Butte County.

The county was named for the volcanic buttes that rise from the desert plain; the largest is Big Southern Butte, located in the southern part of the county. It rises 2,500 feet (760 m) above the desert floor and was used as a landmark by pioneers.

The southwestern portion of the county includes the visitor center at the Craters of the Moon National Monument and Preserve, which extends south and west into three other counties.

=== Adjacent counties ===
- Custer County - northwest
- Lemhi County - northwest
- Clark County - northeast
- Jefferson County - east
- Bingham County - southeast
- Blaine County - southwest

=== Highways ===
- US 20
- US 26
- US 93
- SH-22
- SH-33

=== National protected areas ===
- Caribou-Targhee National Forest (part)
- Craters of the Moon National Monument and Preserve (part)
- Salmon-Challis National Forest (part)

== Demographics ==
Historical population
Census	Pop.	Note	%±
1920	2,940		—
1930	1,934		−34.2%
1940	1,877		−2.9%
1950	2,722		45.0%
1960	3,498		28.5%
1970	2,925		−16.4%
1980	3,342		14.3%
1990	2,918		−12.7%
2000	2,899		−0.7%
2010	2,891		−0.3%
2020	2,574		−11.0%
2025 (est.)	2,783	▲	8.1%
U.S. Decennial Census; 1790–1960, 1900–1990, 1990–2000, 2010–2020

=== Racial and ethnic composition ===
Butte County, Idaho – Racial and ethnic composition Note: the US Census treats Hispanic/Latino as an ethnic category. This table excludes Latinos from the racial categories and assigns them to a separate category. Hispanics/Latinos may be of any race.
Race / Ethnicity (NH = Non-Hispanic)	Pop 1980	Pop 1990	Pop 2000	Pop 2010	Pop 2020	% 1980	% 1990	% 2000	% 2010	% 2020
White alone (NH)	3,199	2,791	2,706	2,713	2,336	95.72%	95.65%	93.34%	93.84%	90.75%
Black or African American alone (NH)	1	0	8	5	2	0.03%	0.00%	0.28%	0.17%	0.08%
Native American or Alaska Native alone (NH)	31	21	17	11	15	0.93%	0.72%	0.59%	0.38%	0.58%
Asian alone (NH)	5	5	7	5	3	0.15%	0.17%	0.24%	0.17%	0.12%
Native Hawaiian or Pacific Islander alone (NH)	x	x	0	5	2	x	x	0.00%	0.17%	0.08%
Other race alone (NH)	4	0	1	0	2	0.12%	0.00%	0.03%	0.00%	0.08%
Mixed race or Multiracial (NH)	x	x	40	33	80	x	x	1.38%	1.14%	3.11%
Hispanic or Latino (any race)	102	101	120	119	134	3.05%	3.46%	4.14%	4.12%	5.21%
Total	3,342	2,918	2,899	2,891	2,574	100.00%	100.00%	100.00%	100.00%	100.00%

=== 2020 census ===
As of the 2020 census, the county had a population of 2,574. The median age was 42.7 years. 25.3% of residents were under the age of 18 and 22.6% of residents were 65 years of age or older. For every 100 females there were 101.3 males, and for every 100 females age 18 and over there were 103.6 males age 18 and over.

The racial makeup of the county was 92.2% White, 0.1% Black or African American, 0.7% American Indian and Alaska Native, 0.1% Asian, 0.1% Native Hawaiian and Pacific Islander, 1.3% from some other race, and 5.6% from two or more races. Hispanic or Latino residents of any race comprised 5.2% of the population.

0.0% of residents lived in urban areas, while 100.0% lived in rural areas.

There were 1,061 households in the county, of which 29.0% had children under the age of 18 living with them and 22.1% had a female householder with no spouse or partner present. About 29.3% of all households were made up of individuals and 16.5% had someone living alone who was 65 years of age or older.

There were 1,289 housing units, of which 17.7% were vacant. Among occupied housing units, 75.2% were owner-occupied and 24.8% were renter-occupied. The homeowner vacancy rate was 3.5% and the rental vacancy rate was 8.4%.

=== 2010 census ===
As of the 2010 United States census, there were 2,891 people, 1,129 households, and 788 families living in the county. The population density was 1.3 inhabitants per square mile (0.50/km^{2}). There were 1,354 housing units at an average density of 0.6 units per square mile (0.23 units/km^{2}). The racial makeup of the county was 95.5% white, 0.4% American Indian, 0.2% Pacific islander, 0.2% Asian, 0.2% black or African American, 2.0% from other races, and 1.5% from two or more races. Those of Hispanic or Latino origin made up 4.1% of the population. In terms of ancestry, 33.4% were English, 18.5% were German, 10.6% were American, 9.1% were Irish, 7.6% were Danish, and 7.2% were Scottish.

Of the 1,129 households, 31.5% had children under the age of 18 living with them, 58.8% were married couples living together, 7.8% had a female householder with no husband present, 30.2% were non-families, and 26.4% of all households were made up of individuals. The average household size was 2.54 and the average family size was 3.10. The median age was 41.7 years.

The median income for a household in the county was $39,413 and the median income for a family was $47,225. Males had a median income of $42,500 versus $26,563 for females. The per capita income for the county was $20,414. About 9.0% of families and 13.8% of the population were below the poverty line, including 17.2% of those under age 18 and 5.0% of those age 65 or over.

=== 2000 census ===
As of the census of 2000, there were 2,899 people, 1,089 households, and 802 families living in the county. The population density was 1 people per square mile (0.39 people/km^{2}). There were 1,290 housing units at an average density of 1 unit per square mile (0.39 units/km^{2}). The racial makeup of the county was 94.65% White, 0.28% Black or African American, 0.69% Native American, 0.24% Asian, 2.38% from other races, and 1.76% from two or more races. 4.14% of the population were Hispanic or Latino of any race. 25.3% were of English, 13.4% American, 8.5% German, 6.3% Irish and 5.5% Swedish ancestry.

There were 1,089 households, out of which 32.80% had children under the age of 18 living with them, 63.20% were married couples living together, 7.40% had a female householder with no husband present, and 26.30% were non-families. 23.60% of all households were made up of individuals, and 10.90% had someone living alone who was 65 years of age or older. The average household size was 2.64 and the average family size was 3.14.

In the county, the population was spread out, with 29.00% under the age of 18, 6.30% from 18 to 24, 24.00% from 25 to 44, 25.70% from 45 to 64, and 14.90% who were 65 years of age or older. The median age was 39 years. For every 100 females there were 101.20 males. For every 100 females age 18 and over, there were 99.30 males.

The median income for a household in the county was $30,473, and the median income for a family was $36,950. Males had a median income of $37,750 versus $20,962 for females. The per capita income for the county was $14,948. About 14.70% of families and 18.20% of the population were below the poverty line, including 27.70% of those under age 18 and 8.10% of those age 65 or over.

=== 2016 ===
As of 2016, the largest self-reported ancestries/ethnicities in Butte County were:

Largest ancestries (2016)	Percent
English (England)	27.7%
"American" (United States)	17.4%
German (Germany)	11.8%
Irish (Republic of Ireland)	6.7%
Italian (Italy)	5.9%
Scottish (Scotland)	4.6%
French (France)	3.6%
Swedish (Sweden)	2.8%
Norwegian (Norway)	1.2%
Welsh (Wales)	1.3%

== Communities ==
=== Cities ===
- Arco
- Butte City
- Moore

=== Unincorporated communities ===
- Darlington
- Lost River
- Howe

== Politics ==
Prior to 1976, Butte County only failed to back the national winner in 1944 in presidential elections between 1920 and 1972. Since 1968, the county has become a Republican Party stronghold, especially since 2000. No Democratic Party candidate has won a quarter of the county's votes since Bill Clinton in 1996.

United States presidential election results for Butte County, Idaho
Year	Republican		Democratic		Third party(ies)	
Year	No.	%	No.	%	No.	%
1920	646	67.15%	316	32.85%	0	0.00%
1924	409	46.01%	284	31.95%	196	22.05%
1928	493	61.86%	301	37.77%	3	0.38%
1932	396	40.33%	581	59.16%	5	0.51%
1936	312	35.90%	546	62.83%	11	1.27%
1940	423	48.56%	448	51.44%	0	0.00%
1944	431	50.77%	416	49.00%	2	0.24%
1948	412	48.70%	426	50.35%	8	0.95%
1952	916	65.95%	473	34.05%	0	0.00%
1956	774	53.64%	669	46.36%	0	0.00%
1960	680	40.45%	1,001	59.55%	0	0.00%
1964	649	43.35%	848	56.65%	0	0.00%
1968	691	50.96%	521	38.42%	144	10.62%
1972	788	56.45%	387	27.72%	221	15.83%
1976	751	51.16%	663	45.16%	54	3.68%
1980	1,275	72.24%	424	24.02%	66	3.74%
1984	1,245	73.89%	429	25.46%	11	0.65%
1988	899	62.26%	521	36.08%	24	1.66%
1992	602	40.05%	433	28.81%	468	31.14%
1996	741	49.70%	507	34.00%	243	16.30%
2000	1,054	72.19%	354	24.25%	52	3.56%
2004	1,077	76.60%	321	22.83%	8	0.57%
2008	1,056	74.89%	318	22.55%	36	2.55%
2012	1,001	77.84%	258	20.06%	27	2.10%
2016	914	74.31%	160	13.01%	156	12.68%
2020	1,202	84.95%	188	13.29%	25	1.77%
2024	1,268	84.87%	185	12.38%	41	2.74%

== Education ==
School districts include:

- Butte County Joint School District 111
- Mackay Joint School District 182

The College of Eastern Idaho includes this county in its catchment zone; however, this county is not in its taxation zone.

== See also ==
- National Register of Historic Places listings in Butte County, Idaho
