= National Register of Historic Places listings in Teton County, Wyoming =

Location of Teton County in Wyoming

This is a list of the National Register of Historic Places listings in Teton County, Wyoming.

This is intended to be a complete list of the properties and districts on the National Register of Historic Places in Teton County, Wyoming, United States.

There are 68 properties and districts listed on the National Register in the county, 5 of which are National Historic Landmarks. Another property was once listed on the Register but has been removed.

This National Park Service list is complete through NPS recent listings posted August 21, 2026.

Contents: Counties in Wyoming
Albany - Big Horn - Campbell - Carbon - Converse - Crook - Fremont - Goshen - Hot Springs - Johnson - Laramie - Lincoln - Natrona - Niobrara - Park - Platte - Sheridan - Sublette - Sweetwater - Teton - Uinta - Washakie - Weston

== Current listings ==
	Name on the Register	Image	Date listed	Location	City or town	Description
1	4 Lazy F Dude Ranch	4 Lazy F Dude Ranch	April 23, 1990 (#90000611)	4 Lazy F Ranch Rd. 43°40′01″N 110°42′20″W	Grand Teton National Park	Summer home and purpose-built dude ranch established in 1927, with 18 contributing properties, representing the later stage of the industry building from the ground up rather than adapting working ranches.
2	Alpenhof Lodge	Alpenhof Lodge	August 9, 2016 (#16000520)	3255 W. Village Dr. 43°35′16″N 110°49′38″W	Teton Village	Jackson Hole Mountain Resort's first hotel, built in Swiss chalet style in 1965 and expanded in 1977; instrumental in expanding Teton County's tourism economy into the winter season.
3	AMK Ranch	AMK Ranch	April 23, 1990 (#90000615)	AMK Ranch Rd. 43°56′20″N 110°38′32″W	Grand Teton National Park	Superlative example of two later stages of rustic architecture as developed for 20th-century vacation homes, with 14 contributing properties built in 1927 and 1936–1937. Became the University of Wyoming/National Park Service Research Center in 1977.
4	Bar B C Dude Ranch	Bar B C Dude Ranch	April 23, 1990 (#90000624)	River Rd. 43°41′42″N 110°41′42″W	Grand Teton National Park	Purpose-built 1912 dude ranch with 37 contributing properties that helped set standards for the local industry under co-owner and author Struthers Burt (1882–1954).
5	Bridge over Snake River-Structure DEY	Bridge over Snake River-Structure DEY	August 1, 2022 (#100007949)	Swinging Bridge Rd. 43°22′18″N 110°44′21″W	Hoback	Nominated as Wyoming's only remaining example of a three-span, pin-connected Pratt truss bridge, built in 1960 with relocated spans from 1915. Removed in 2023.
6	The Brinkerhoff	The Brinkerhoff	April 23, 1990 (#90000622)	Teton Park Rd. 43°51′04″N 110°35′37″W	Grand Teton National Park	1946 vacation home and caretaker's cottage, a late-stage representative of the private leases once dotting Teton National Forest. Also noted for the publicity it brought Grand Teton National Park as a presidential retreat in the 1960s, and for its mid-century twist on rustic architecture.
7	Cascade Canyon Barn	Cascade Canyon Barn	August 18, 1998 (#98001023)	Cascade Canyon Trail; 43°46′03″N 110°49′07″W	Grand Teton National Park	Circa-1935 barn noted for its National Park Service rustic architecture and association with Grand Teton's backcountry development. Converted to a patrol cabin around 1960.
8	Andy Chambers Ranch Historic District	Andy Chambers Ranch Historic District	April 23, 1990 (#90000623)	Mormon Row Rd. 43°39′32″N 110°39′49″W	Grand Teton National Park	Farmstead with nine contributing properties built 1917–1925; the most intact representative of Jackson Hole's majority Mormon settlers in the first two decades of the 20th century. Also a contributing property to the Mormon Row Historic District.
9	Chapel of the Transfiguration	Chapel of the Transfiguration	April 10, 1980 (#80004055)	Menors Ferry Rd. 43°39′36″N 110°42′55″W	Moose	Distinctive chapel and two outbuildings built in Western Craftsman style in 1925 for employees and guests of area dude ranches.
10	John Clymer Residence		March 10, 2025 (#100011059)	7255 N. Rachel Way; 43°35′09″N 110°50′00″W	Teton Village	1969 home and studio designed for himself by influential Western artist John Clymer (1907–1989) in the mix of Mid-century modern and Swiss chalet style popular in American ski resorts at the time.
11	Coe Blacksmith Shop		April 17, 2026 (#100012926)	75 S. King St. 43°28′44″N 110°45′39″W	Jackson	
12	Coe Cabin	Coe Cabin	November 13, 2024 (#100011063)	85 S. King St. 43°28′43″N 110°45′39″W	Jackson	1914 cabin expanded into a commercial laundry in 1921, back to a single-family home in the 1930s, and into a multi-family residence in the 1940s, illustrating the adaptive reuse of buildings and building material in an isolated mountain community. Now the Coe Tavern.
13	Cunningham Cabin	Cunningham Cabin	October 2, 1973 (#73000225)	Off U.S. Routes 26/89/187; 43°46′43″N 110°33′30″W	Grand Teton National Park	Log dogtrot house representing the western diffusion of frontier architecture, built in the second half of the 1880s by one of the first White settlers in Jackson Hole, who later became a prominent rancher and local government official. Now an interpretive site.
14	Darwin Ranch		April 27, 2021 (#100005445)	1 Kinky Creek Rd. 43°24′47″N 110°09′46″W	Cora vicinity	Isolated ranch established in 1901 as a homestead supplemented with trapping income, later alternating as a dude ranch and affluent vacation home, encapsulating common regional trends in its 11 contributing properties also noted for their Western Craftsman architecture.
15	Death Canyon Barn	Death Canyon Barn	August 25, 1998 (#98001024)	Junction of Death Canyon and Alaska Basin Trails; 43°39′51″N 110°49′52″W	Grand Teton National Park	1935 barn and corral converted to a backcountry patrol cabin around 1945. Noted for its National Park Service rustic architecture and association with the park's early management.
16	Double Diamond Dude Ranch Dining Hall	Double Diamond Dude Ranch Dining Hall	August 18, 1998 (#98001028)	End Highlands Rd. 43°42′17″N 110°44′07″W	Grand Teton National Park	Circa-1945 main building of a dude ranch, noted for its rustic architecture. Now part of the Grand Teton Climbers Ranch.
17	Flat Creek Ranch		December 31, 2001 (#01001428)	1 Upper Flat Creek Rd. 43°31′37″N 110°32′38″W	Jackson vicinity	Vacation ranch with nine contributing properties developed beginning in 1923 by newspaper heiress Cissy Patterson; an early and influential example of Jackson Hole becoming a haven for wealthy outsiders. Now a guest ranch.
18	Game Creek		December 2, 2019 (#100004708)	Confluence of Game Creek and Flat Creek; 43°23′37″N 110°44′47″W	South Park vicinity	Well-stratified archaeological site occupied intermittently from the Middle Paleo-Indian to the Late Prehistoric period, with potential to illuminate hunter-gatherer movement, settlement, and lifeways in this high altitude environment.
19	George Washington Memorial Park	George Washington Memorial Park	December 5, 2003 (#03001250)	Between Cache, Center, Broadway, and Deloney; 43°28′48″N 110°45′42″W	Jackson	Prominent central park formalized in 1934 through community activism, state initiatives, and federal funding, and gaining the first of its distinctive elk antler arches in 1953.
20	Hardeman Barns	Hardeman Barns	April 28, 2015 (#15000190)	5450 W. WY 22; 43°29′48″N 110°52′17″W	Wilson	Five distinctive log barns and outbuildings constructed circa-1930–1945; prominent symbols of Jackson Hole's ranching history. Acquired in 2017 to house the Teton Raptor Center.
21	Highlands Historic District	Highlands Historic District	August 19, 1998 (#98001029)	End Highlands Rd. 43°42′32″N 110°43′47″W	Grand Teton National Park	Example of the area's auto camp resorts catering to mid-20th-century tourists, with 19 contributing properties in dude ranch rustic style built 1946–1956.
22	Huckleberry Mountain Fire Lookout		July 8, 1983 (#83003365)	7 miles off U.S. Routes 89/287; 44°04′58″N 110°35′52″W	Bridger–Teton National Forest	Last standing fire lookout tower in the northern Teton National Forest, built in 1938; symbolizing the U.S. Forest Service's early wildfire management practices and use of rustic architecture by the Civilian Conservation Corps.
23	Huff Memorial Library	Huff Memorial Library	December 5, 2003 (#03001253)	320 S. King St. 43°28′34″N 110°45′37″W	Jackson	Public library built 1938–1940 through widespread local efforts combined with federal funding, producing a key community institution. Moved to a new facility in 1997.
24	Hunter Hereford Ranch Historic District	Hunter Hereford Ranch Historic District	August 24, 1998 (#98001031)	Antelope Flats Rd. 43°40′35″N 110°36′37″W	Grand Teton National Park	Eight intact work components of a hobby ranch established in 1945, exemplifying the final stage of agricultural development in Jackson Hole while exhibiting both vernacular and architect-designed rustic architecture.
25	Jackson Hole American Legion Post No. 43	Jackson Hole American Legion Post No. 43	September 12, 2003 (#03000939)	182 N. Cache St. 43°28′54″N 110°45′43″W	Jackson	1929 American Legion clubhouse, host to a wide variety of civic and recreational activities over a period when the societal balance of Jackson Hole shifted from rural to urban.
26	Jackson Lake Lodge	Jackson Lake Lodge	July 31, 2003 (#03001039)	101 Jackson Lake Lodge Rd. 43°52′39″N 110°34′39″W	Grand Teton National Park	1955 International Style lodge and cottage complex with 39 contributing properties; Gilbert Stanley Underwood's last major work, which introduced and legitimized Modern architecture in the National Park system and lay the basis for the Mission 66 initiative.
27	Jackson Lake Ranger Station	Jackson Lake Ranger Station	April 23, 1990 (#90000620)	Off Teton Park Rd. 43°52′18″N 110°34′17″W	Grand Teton National Park	Four-building ranger station complex built in 1933 by the U.S. Forest Service; the most intact representative of the tempestuous transfer of the area to the National Park Service.
28	Jenny Lake Boat Concession Facilities	Jenny Lake Boat Concession Facilities	August 24, 1998 (#98001032)	Southern end of Jenny Lake; 43°45′05″N 110°43′35″W	Grand Teton National Park	Circa-1930 boathouse and 1937 NPS rustic cabin, the oldest concession properties at the first developed visitor area in Grand Teton National Park.
29	Jenny Lake CCC Camp NP-4	Jenny Lake CCC Camp NP-4	July 7, 2006 (#98001033)	Off Lupine Meadows Rd. 43°44′57″N 110°43′31″W	Grand Teton National Park	1935 messhall and bathhouse, two rare surviving buildings attesting to the living conditions of Civilian Conservation Corps camps.
30	Jenny Lake Ranger Station Historic District	Jenny Lake Ranger Station Historic District	April 23, 1990 (#90000610)	Jenny Lake Rd. 43°45′08″N 110°43′20″W	Grand Teton National Park	Grand Teton's principle visitor contact area 1930–1960, with four NPS rustic buildings, including two built by the CCC, a repurposed settler's cabin, and the studio of photographer Harrison Crandall, who helped popularize the park.
31	Kimmel Kabins	Kimmel Kabins	April 23, 1990 (#90000612)	Lupine Meadows Rd. 43°44′38″N 110°43′38″W	Grand Teton National Park	Grand Teton's only surviving motor court, with 13 dude ranch–style contributing properties built in 1937.
32	Lake Fish Hatchery Historic District	Lake Fish Hatchery Historic District	December 7, 1982 (#85001416)	Yellowstone Lake Rd. 44°32′59″N 110°24′15″W	Yellowstone National Park	Fish hatchery complex with nine NPS rustic contributing properties built 1930–1932; a reminder of the 57 years of fish stocking at Yellowstone and changed conservation policies.
33	Lake Hotel	Lake Hotel	May 16, 1991 (#91000637)	235 Yellowstone Lake Rd. 44°32′59″N 110°24′01″W	Yellowstone National Park	Yellowstone's only surviving grand early hotel, established in 1891, altered and expanded in Colonial Revival style beginning in 1903 by Robert Reamer.
34	Leigh Lake Ranger Patrol Cabin	Leigh Lake Ranger Patrol Cabin	April 23, 1990 (#90000618)	Leigh Lake Trail; 43°49′38″N 110°43′34″W	Grand Teton National Park	Backcountry patrol cabin built in the early 1920s, representing the U.S. Forest Service's stewardship of the area before Grand Teton National Park was established in 1929.
35	Geraldine Lucas Homestead–Fabian Place Historic District	Geraldine Lucas Homestead–Fabian Place Historic District	August 24, 1998 (#98001034)	Off Teton Park Rd. 43°43′03″N 110°43′57″W	Grand Teton National Park	Homestead with 11 contributing properties, unusually established 1913–1938 by a single woman; becoming in 1945 the summer home of a Snake River Land Company official instrumental in amassing local properties for park expansion.
36	Madison Museum	Madison Museum	July 9, 1982 (#82001720)	Grand Loop Rd. and West Entrance Rd. 44°38′32″N 110°51′44″W	Yellowstone National Park	1930 museum significant for its NPS rustic design and association with the National Park Service's adoption of visitor education as an objective.
37	Manges Cabin	Manges Cabin	August 19, 1998 (#98001035)	Off Teton Park Rd. 43°41′54″N 110°44′02″W	Grand Teton National Park	Distinctive 1½-story log cabin built in 1911 with wide, snow-shedding eaves, representing vernacular architecture.
38	Menor's Ferry	Menor's Ferry	April 16, 1969 (#69000016)	Menors Ferry Rd. 43°39′33″N 110°42′44″W	Grand Teton National Park	Well-preserved 19th-century ferry operation, consisting of a cabin/general store and replica ferry and cableworks.
39	Miller Cabin	Miller Cabin	April 16, 1969 (#69000195)	National Elk Refuge Rd. 43°29′20″N 110°44′16″W	Jackson	Log cabin and ranch house of pioneer turned conservation manager Robert A. Miller (b. 1863), used respectively as the headquarters of a division of the Yellowstone Forest Reserve (1902) and of the National Elk Refuge (1912).
40	Grace and Robert Miller Ranch	Grace and Robert Miller Ranch	November 11, 2002 (#01001454)	National Elk Refuge Rd. 43°29′22″N 110°44′12″W	Jackson	Boundary increase of the Miller Cabin (built 1895–98) and ranch house listing to include an 1898 barn, encapsulating the settlement, ranching, and conservation history of Jackson Hole.
41	Moose Entrance Kiosk	Moose Entrance Kiosk	April 23, 1990 (#90000619)	Teton Park Rd. 43°39′37″N 110°43′17″W	Grand Teton National Park	Small entrance station built sometime 1934–1939, representing Grand Teton's National Park Service rustic architecture of the 1930s and its only example of this building plan.
42	Moran Bay Patrol Cabin		August 25, 1998 (#98001037)	Northern bank of Moran Bay on Jackson Lake; 43°52′04″N 110°44′30″W	Grand Teton National Park	Backcountry patrol cabin built c. 1932 on U.S. Forest Service land later incorporated into Grand Teton National Park; significant for its rustic architecture and association with park development. Destroyed by a forest fire in 2000.
43	Mormon Row Historic District	Mormon Row Historic District	June 5, 1997 (#97000495)	Mormon Row Rd. 43°39′40″N 110°39′51″W	Grand Teton National Park	Row of six homesteads inhabited 1908–1950, with 44 contributing properties noted for their vernacular architecture and association with the extension of Mormon settlement and agriculture into marginal, high-elevation areas.
44	Murie Ranch Historic District	Murie Ranch Historic District	August 24, 1998 (#98001039)	Off Moose Wilson Rd. 43°39′01″N 110°43′43″W	Grand Teton National Park	Former ranch with 26 contributing properties acquired in 1945 by wildlife biologists turned conservation leaders Olaus (1889–1963), Adolph (1899–1974), and Margaret Murie (1902–2003). Now part of the Teton Science Schools.
45	Murie Residence	Murie Residence	April 23, 1990 (#90000616)	Off Moose Wilson Rd. 43°39′00″N 110°43′39″W	Grand Teton National Park	Beginning in 1945, the house and studio of Olaus Murie (1889–1963), president of The Wilderness Society and a national leader in the conservation movement. Also contributing properties to the Murie Ranch Historic District.
46	Norris, Madison, and Fishing Bridge Museums	Norris, Madison, and Fishing Bridge Museums	May 28, 1987 (#87001445)	Norris Geyser Basin, Madison Junction, and Fishing Bridge; 44°33′47″N 110°22′40″W	Yellowstone National Park	Three trailside museums and a staff residence built 1929–1931, whose National Park Service rustic architecture was a major influence on buildings in national, state, and county parks around the U.S. during the New Deal. Extends into Park County.
47	Old Administrative Area Historic District	Old Administrative Area Historic District	April 23, 1990 (#90000621)	Off Teton Park Rd. 43°41′10″N 110°44′08″W	Grand Teton National Park	Headquarters complex with 15 contributing properties built 1934–1939, representing Grand Teton's National Park Service rustic architecture of the 1930s and its only examples of these building plans.
48	Old Faithful Historic District	Old Faithful Historic District	December 7, 1982 (#82001839)	Both sides of Grand Loop Rd. at Old Faithful Geyser; 44°27′13″N 110°50′09″W	Yellowstone National Park	Visitor service complex representing the National Park Service's early-20th-century development of automobile tourist facilities and its aesthetic use of rustic architecture even on utilitarian buildings.
49	Old Faithful Inn	Old Faithful Inn	July 23, 1973 (#73000226)	3200 Old Faithful Inn Rd. 44°27′35″N 110°49′52″W	Yellowstone National Park	Masterful and rare surviving example of a log hotel, built 1903–1927; a key precursor of National Park Service rustic style and hotel design. Also a contributing property to the Old Faithful Historic District.
50	Gap Puche Cabin		June 18, 1990 (#90000889)	Gros Ventre Rd. 43°36′33″N 110°27′19″W	Kelly vicinity	Jackson Hole's only surviving building associated with the early outfitter industry, used as a hunting base camp beginning in 1930 by co-owner John Wort (b. 1900), an influential local entrepreneur and community leader.
51	Queen's Laundry Bath House	Queen's Laundry Bath House	July 25, 2001 (#01000790)	Sentinel Meadows, Lower Geyser Basin; 44°33′49″N 110°52′14″W	Yellowstone National Park	Ruins of an 1881 bath house, the first federally-funded visitor facility built in a national park. Also associated with Philetus Norris (1821–1885) and Yellowstone's early years under a civilian superintendent.
52	R Lazy S Ranch		July 2, 2026 (#100012925)	7800 N. Moose-Wilson Rd. 43°35′38″N 110°47′42″W	Wilson	1909 homestead that became a dude ranch in 1936, a family ranch in 1941, then the new base of a relocated dude ranch in 1972—encapsulating local patterns of settlement and recreation, with 37 contributing properties also noted for their western vernacular architecture.
53	Ramshorn Dude Ranch Lodge	Ramshorn Dude Ranch Lodge	August 19, 1998 (#98001041)	1 Ditch Creek Rd. 43°40′13″N 110°35′49″W	Grand Teton National Park	Circa-1935 lodge noted for its characteristic dude ranch log architecture, workmanship, and layout. Now part of the Teton Science Schools.
54	Rosencrans Cabin Historic District		August 6, 1980 (#80004056)	U.S.F.S. Rd. off U.S. Route 26/287; 43°49′59″N 110°20′49″W	Moran vicinity	Five-building ranger station built circa 1915, noted for its fine log architecture, long use by the U.S. Forest Service, and association with early ranger Rudolf "Rosie" Rosencrans (1875–1970).
55	Snake River Land Company Residence and Office	Snake River Land Company Residence and Office	July 7, 2006 (#98001036)	Off U.S. Route 191, ¼ mile north of Moran; 43°50′33″N 110°30′47″W	Grand Teton National Park	1927 house with two outbuildings, noted for its late vernacular architecture and use 1930–1950 as the headquarters of the Snake River Land Company, the front behind which John D. Rockefeller Jr. bought land for park expansion.
56	Snake River Ranch		November 26, 2004 (#04001089)	5700 Snake River Ranch Rd. 43°33′47″N 110°48′06″W	Wilson	Large, state-of-the-art cattle ranch established in 1929, with 24 contributing properties. A functionally typical ranch distinctive for its economic success and fine architecture by internationally prominent architects.
57	Squirrel Meadows Guard Station		October 4, 1990 (#90000149)	Road 032; 44°03′47″N 111°01′19″W	Alta vicinity	1934 patrol cabin (one of only two Wyoming examples of a standard plan) and outhouse representative of U.S. Forest Service administrative architecture of the 1930s—an era of rapid expansion. Now a public rental cabin.
58	St. John's Episcopal Church and Rectory	St. John's Episcopal Church and Rectory	December 1, 1978 (#78002834)	132 N. Glenwood St. 43°28′54″N 110°45′49″W	Jackson	1916 church and 1911 rectory used as a hostel, school, and library. Noted for their log architecture and central role in the religious, social, and educational life of Jackson Hole.
59	String Lake Comfort Station	String Lake Comfort Station	April 23, 1990 (#90000617)	String Lake Rd. 43°47′20″N 110°43′49″W	Grand Teton National Park	Public restroom built to a standard plan in the second half of the 1930s; representative of Grand Teton's National Park Service rustic architecture of the New Deal.
60	Triangle X Barn	Triangle X Barn	August 19, 1998 (#98001042)	2 Triangle X Ranch Rd. 43°45′53″N 110°34′03″W	Grand Teton National Park	Log barn exhibiting a variety of notching styles, built circa 1928 with some logs from an older unfinished cabin, illustrating the reuse of building materials in frontier settings and the persistence of vernacular architecture at dude ranches.
61	Upper Granite Canyon Patrol Cabin	Upper Granite Canyon Patrol Cabin	August 19, 1998 (#98001043)	Granite Canyon Trail; 43°36′49″N 110°53′52″W	Grand Teton National Park	Backcountry patrol cabin built in 1935, representing National Park Service rustic architecture and the early development of Grand Teton National Park.
62	Van Vleck House and Barn	Van Vleck House and Barn	September 7, 1995 (#95001075)	135 E. Broadway Ave. 43°28′47″N 110°45′37″W	Jackson	Log cabin built 1910–11 and slightly younger barn; rare vestiges of Jackson's initial settlement period in the early 20th century.
63	Ellen G. Walker Shop	Ellen G. Walker Shop	March 10, 2025 (#100011061)	81 S. King St. 43°28′44″N 110°45′39″W	Jackson	1948 women's clothing store established by prominent Wyoming businesswoman Ellen G. Walker (1894–1987).
64	Henry and Estella Weston House	Henry and Estella Weston House	January 3, 2023 (#100008513)	165 E. Broadway Ave. 43°28′47″N 110°45′35″W	Jackson	Small frame house built in 1936 in what is now a highly altered commercial district; emblematic of the rapid growth and typical housing stock of Jackson in the 1920s and 30s.
65	White Grass Dude Ranch	White Grass Dude Ranch	April 23, 1990 (#90000613)	1168 Whitegrass Ranch Rd. 43°39′26″N 110°46′26″W	Grand Teton National Park	Former cattle ranch that became Jackson Hole's longest-lived dude ranch, in operation 1919–1985, exemplifying and influencing the local industry, with 13 contributing properties.
66	White Grass Ranger Station Historic District	White Grass Ranger Station Historic District	April 23, 1990 (#90000614)	100 Whitegrass Ranger Station Rd. 43°39′19″N 110°46′54″W	Grand Teton National Park	Grand Teton National Park's only remaining 1930s horse patrol station, with four contributing properties exhibiting pre-New Deal National Park Service rustic architecture.
67	Wilson Commercial Historic District		July 23, 2025 (#100012032)	Main St. & WYO Highway 22; 43°29′53″N 110°52′28″W	Wilson	Eight contributing properties built 1931–1974, reflecting Wilson's gradual development from a homestead offering various services into a defined commercial corridor along a state highway.
68	Wort Hotel	Wort Hotel	December 9, 1999 (#99001507)	50 N. Glenwood St. 43°28′48″N 110°45′48″W	Jackson	First luxury hotel in Jackson Hole, built in 1941 as the centerpiece of the Wort family's influential efforts to develop the area as a tourist destination.

== Former listings ==
	Name on the Register	Image	Date listed	Date removed	Location	City or town	Description
1	Leek's Lodge	Leek's Lodge	September 5, 1975 (#75000216)	April 15, 2014	Leeks Marina Rd. 43°55′49″N 110°38′21″W	Grand Teton National Park	1926 main building of an early-20th-century resort. Destroyed by fire in 1998, leaving only the stone chimney.

== See also ==
- List of National Historic Landmarks in Wyoming
- National Register of Historic Places listings in Wyoming
- National Register of Historic Places listings in Grand Teton National Park
- National Register of Historic Places listings in Yellowstone National Park
