= START Bus =

Public bus system in Wyoming

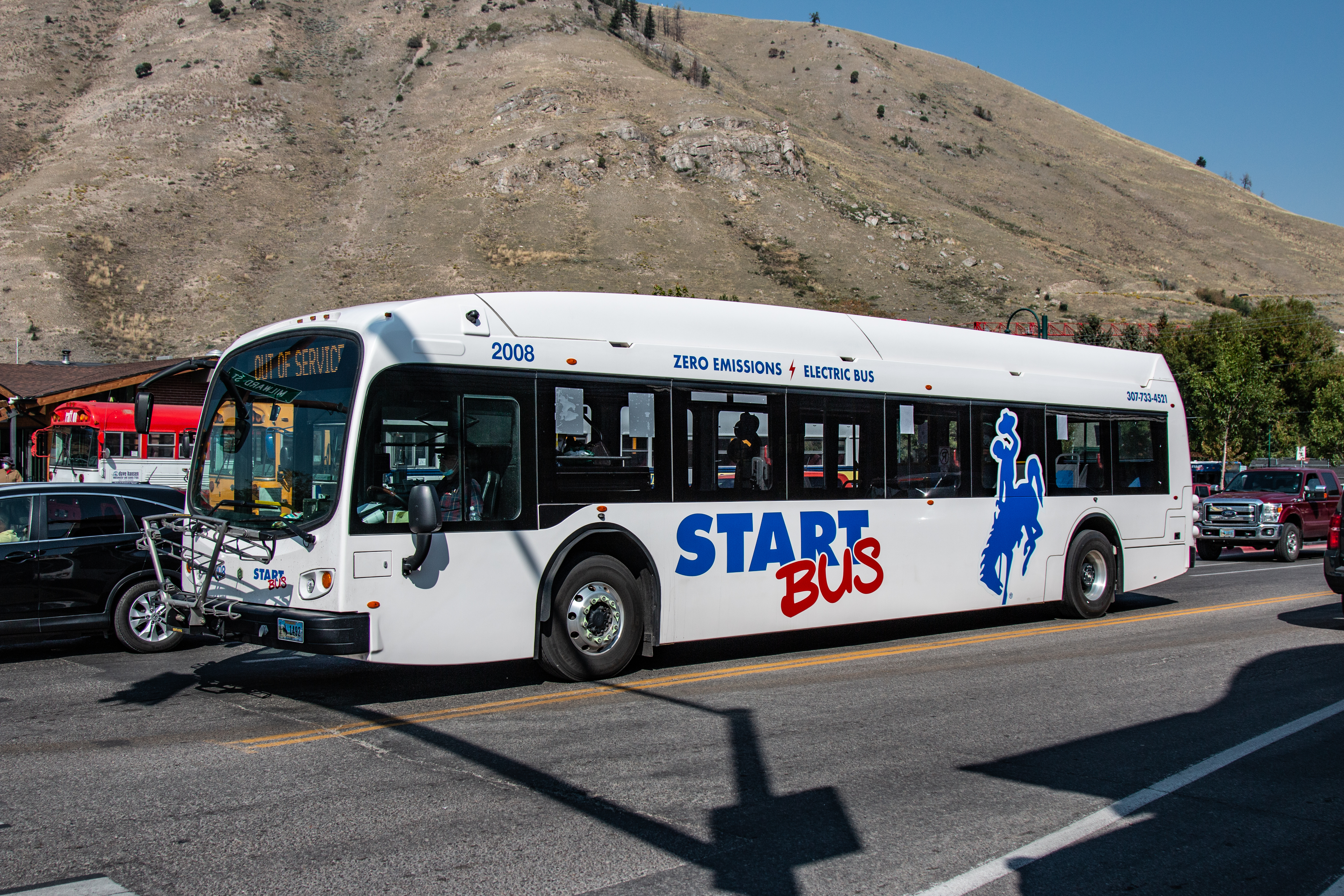
- START Bus Proterra ZX5 on Millward St in downtown Jackson
- Parent: Town of Jackson
- Founded: 1987
- Headquarters: Jackson, Wyoming
- Service area: Teton County, Wyoming; Teton County, Idaho; Lincoln County, Wyoming
- Service type: Local bus; Commuter bus
- Routes: 5,8(Winter)
- Stops: 74
- Fleet: 30
- Daily ridership: 2,450 (2013 average)
- Operator: Town of Jackson
- Chief executive: Susan Mick, Chair of Board of Directors
- Website: startbus.com

START Bus (Southern Teton Area Rapid Transit) is a public bus system serving Jackson, Wyoming, and nearby areas including Teton Village, Star Valley and Teton Valley, Idaho. It is owned and operated by the Town of Jackson with funding from local, county, and federal governments.

START Bus was founded in 1987 to provide transportation for skiers between downtown Jackson and Jackson Hole Mountain Resort in Teton Village. Today, in addition to transporting skiers to the ski resort, it serves commuters and provides bus service within the town of Jackson.

START does not currently serve the Jackson Hole Airport. The Town of Jackson instead offers free parking in its downtown parking garage and an $8 shuttle operated by Alltrans through a partnership called Ride2Fly. This program ended December 1, 2015, leaving no public transportation option to and from the Jackson Hole Airport.

In November 2013, START Bus was awarded $8 million from the United States Department of Transportation to build an indoor bus storage and maintenance facility.

== Routes ==
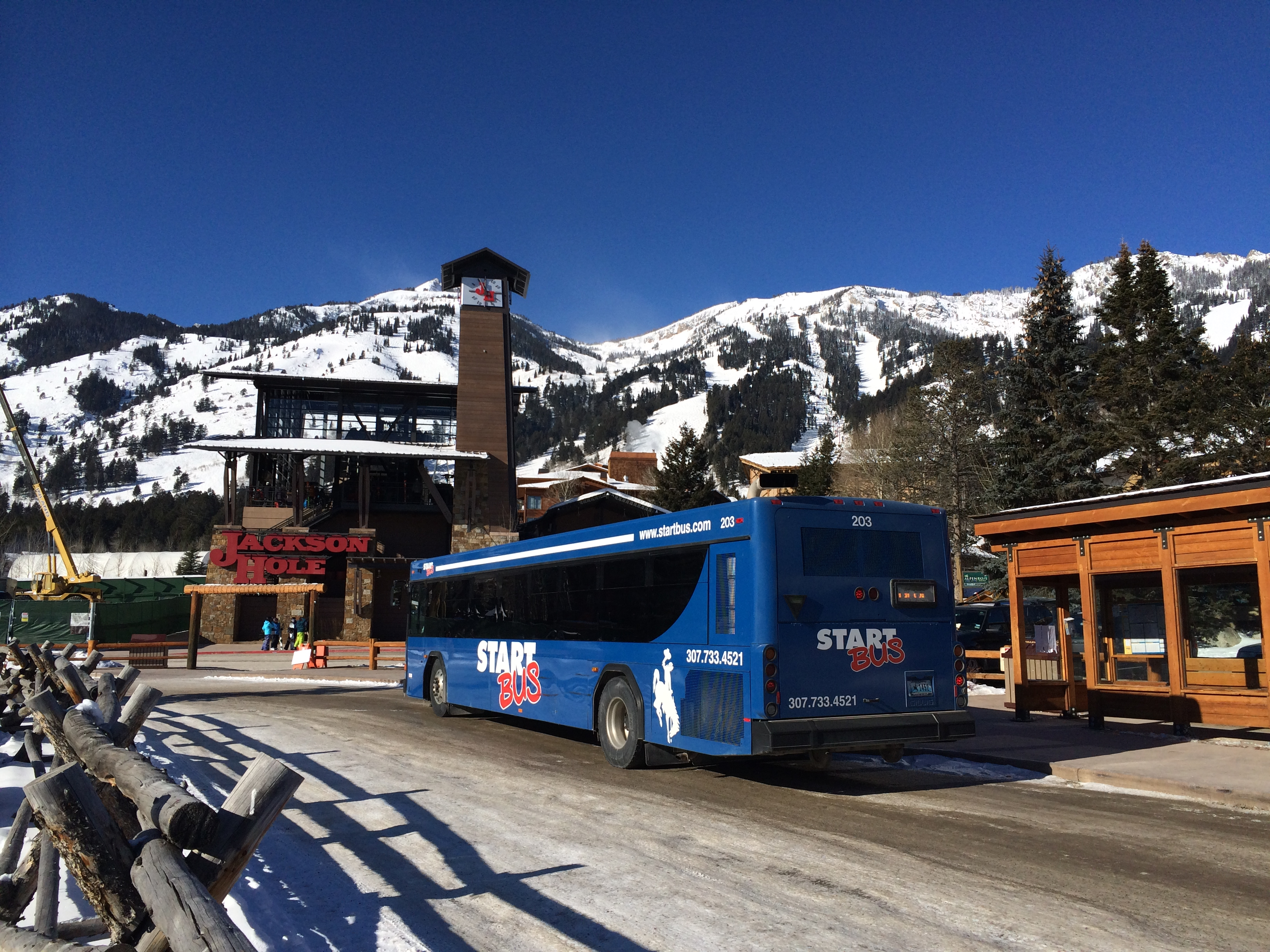
START Gillig Low Floor in Teton Village

START operates 8 bus routes during the peak winter season including 4 routes between the Town of Jackson and the Jackson Hole Mountain Resort in Teton Village. In the spring, summer and fall, START operates 5 routes with only one route to Teton Village.

- Town Shuttle 1 – Service within Jackson city limits. Operates every half-hour year-round.
- Town Shuttle 2 – Service in the core of Jackson along Snow King Avenue. Operates every half-hour year-round.
- Route 20 Green Line – Early morning and late night service between Jackson and Teton Village in the winter and all day service in the spring, summer and fall.
- Route 26 Blue Line – Winter daytime service between Jackson and Teton Village.
- Route 24 Red Line – Winter daytime service between East Jackson and Teton Village.
- Route 22 Yellow Line – Winter daytime service between Jackson and Teton Village.
- Route 30 Teton Valley – Year-round weekday commuter service over Teton Pass between Jackson and Driggs with stops at Wilson and Victor
- Route 40 Star Valley – Year-round weekday commuter service between Jackson and Etna with stops at Hoback and Alpine

== Fares ==
START Buses are free within Jackson City Limits and between the Teton Village Transit Center at Stilson Ranch and Teton Village. From Jackson to Teton Village the fare is $3 each way, reduced to $1 for travel exclusively on Moose Wilson Road. The commuter routes are $8 each way. Multi-ride and monthly passes are available and many employers provide free or reduced passes to their employees.

== See also ==
- List of bus transit systems in the United States
