= Moose–Wilson Road =

Highway in Wyoming, United States

Wyoming Highway 390
- Moose–Wilson Road
- Moose–Wilson Road highlighted in red

Route information
- Maintained by WYDOT
- Length: 15 mi (24 km) 7.7 miles (12.39 km) as WY 390

Major junctions
- South end: WYO 22 in Wilson
- Teton Village Road in Teton Village
- North end: GTNP Park Headquarters in Moose

Location
- Country: United States
- State: Wyoming
- Counties: Teton

Highway system
- Wyoming State Highway System; Interstate; US; State
| ← WYO 387 | → WYO 391 |

Moose–Wilson Road is a road in the U.S. state of Wyoming; the southern 7.70 miles (12.39 km) of the road outside of Grand Teton National Park is Wyoming Highway 390 (WYO 390). The road runs about 15 miles (24 km) through the Jackson Hole valley from its intersection with WYO 22 east of Wilson on the south to Moose in Grand Teton National Park on the north end.

== Route description ==
The road is the primary route from Jackson, Wyoming to Teton Village and the Jackson Hole Mountain Resort, which is located just south of the national park border. The area along the road to the ski area was originally ranch land, but it has been progressively developed over the years.

After entering the park, the road narrows and winds its way through a forested area along the edge of the mountains. A number of trailheads are accessible from the road, including the Death Canyon / Phelps Lake trailhead located about 5 miles (8.0 km) from the northern terminus of the state designation. The road's terminus is the park's headquarters and visitor center.

== Major intersections ==
The entire route is in Teton County.

| Location | mi | km | Destinations | Notes |
|---|---|---|---|---|
| Wilson | 0.0 | 0.0 | WYO 22 (Teton Pass Highway) – Jackson, Wilson | Southern terminus of WYO 390 and Moose–Wilson Road |
| Teton Village | 6.6 | 10.6 | Teton Village Road | |
| Teton Village | 7.7 | 12.4 | Range Road | Northern terminus of WYO 390, entering Grand Teton National Park |
| Moose | 14.6 | 23.5 | To Teton Park Road / US 26 / US 89 / US 191 | |
| Moose | 15.0 | 24.1 | Park Headquarters / Visitor Center | Northern terminus of Moose–Wilson Road |
1.000 mi = 1.609 km; 1.000 km = 0.621 mi

== See also ==
- Moose Wilson Road, Wyoming, a census designated place
