= KJNT =

- Jackson, Wyoming; United States
- Frequency: 1490 kHz

Ownership
- Owner: Ted W. Austin, Jr.

History
- First air date: June 29, 2011

Technical information
- Licensing authority: FCC
- Facility ID: 161525
- Class: C
- Power: 1,000 watts
- Transmitter coordinates: 43°28′28″N 110°46′7″W
- Translator: 99.7 K259CP (Hoback Junction)

Links
- Public license information: Public file; LMS

KJNT (1490 AM) is a radio station licensed to cover Jackson, Wyoming, United States. The station is currently owned by Ted W. Austin, Jr.

The station has faced several operational hurdles common to small-market AM broadcasting in mountainous terrain. In mid-2015, KJNT was forced to go silent due to significant transmitter failures. During this period, the station was briefly put up for sale as the ownership sought a partner to assist with technical repairs and site upgrades.

More recently, the station was involved in a Consent Decree with the FCC in September 2024. The agreement settled an investigation into the station's failure to maintain its Online Public Inspection File, a regulatory requirement for all licensed broadcasters.

KJNT is a part of Ted Austin's Snake River Broadcasting and Madison Radio Partners holdings. In September 2023, the ownership group expanded its footprint by acquiring several stations from Northeast Broadcasting's Jackson Radio Group, including KIXM (Victor, ID) and KDAD (Victor, ID). This move integrated KJNT into a larger cluster that provides a variety of formats across the Wyoming-Idaho border.
