= Wyoming Highway 22 =

State highway in Teton County, Wyoming, United States

Wyoming Highway 22
- Teton Pass Highway
- WYO 22 highlighted in red

Route information
- Maintained by WYDOT
- Length: 17.494 mi (28.154 km)

Major junctions
- West end: SH-33 at the Idaho state line near Victor, ID
- WYO 390 on the Wilson-Moose Wilson Road line
- East end: US 26 / US 89 / US 189 / US 191 in Jackson

Location
- Country: United States
- State: Wyoming
- Counties: Teton

Highway system
- Wyoming State Highway System; Interstate; US; State
| ← US 20 | → WYO 24 |

Wyoming Highway 22 (WYO 22), also known as the Teton Pass Highway, is a 17.494-mile (28.154 km) state highway in Teton County, Wyoming, United States. It connects Idaho State Highway 33 (SH-33) at the Idaho-Wyoming state line with U.S. Routes 26 / U.S. Route 89 / U.S. Route 189 / U.S. Route 191 (US 26 / US 89 / US 189 / US 191) in Jackson.

== Route description ==
WYO 22 begins at the west end of SH-33 on the Idaho-Wyoming state line in the Caribou–Targhee National Forest. (SH-33 heads west toward Victor, Ashton, and Idaho Falls.) From its western terminus, WYO 22 proceeds southeast for 6.4 miles (10.3 km) along the north bank of Trail Creek as it climbs over 1,700 feet (520 m) to the Teton Pass, which has an elevation of 8,435 feet (2,571 m) above sea level. At Teton Pass, WYO 22 leaves the Caribou–Targhee National Forest and enters the Bridger–Teton National Forest.

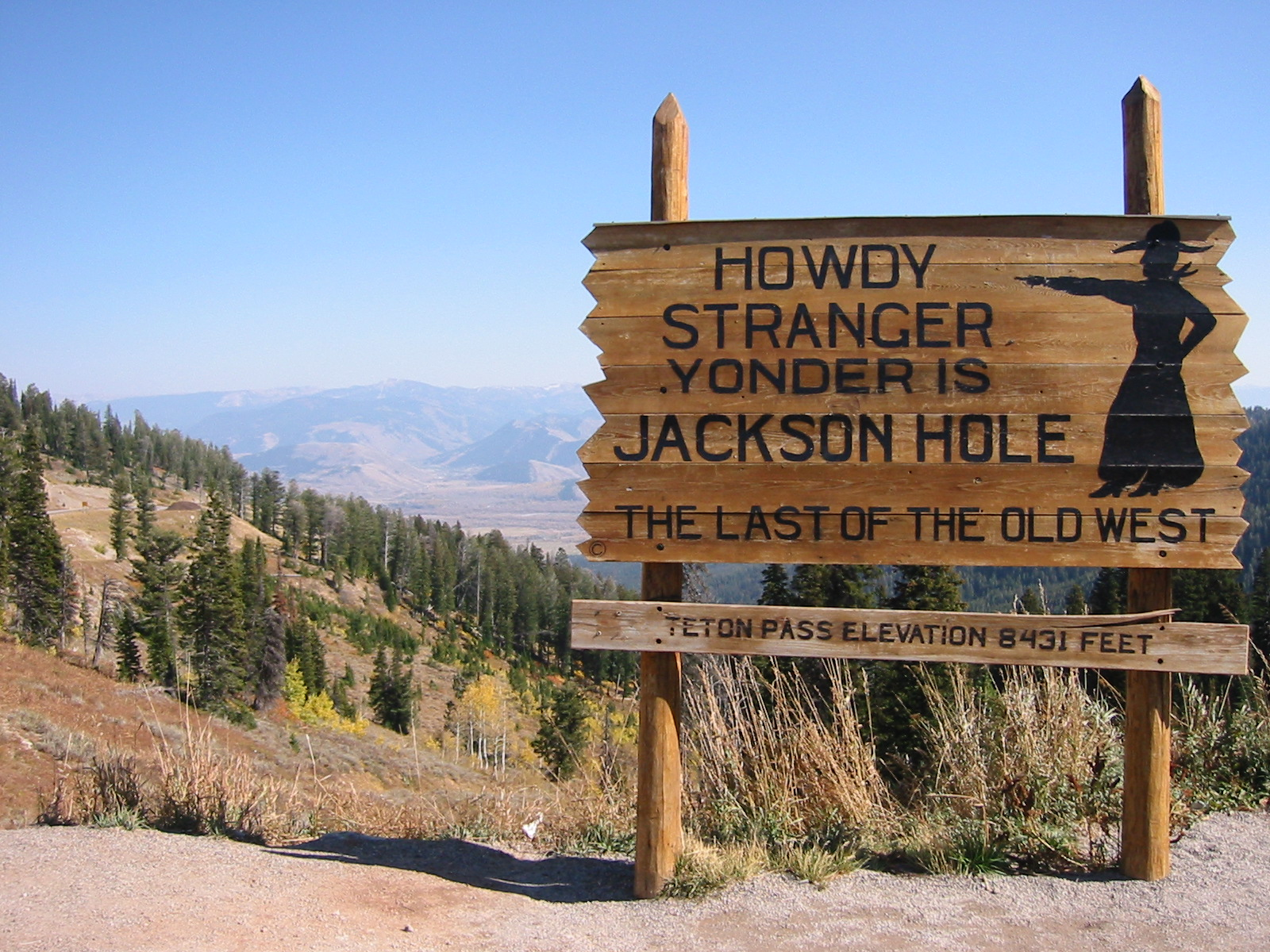
Teton Pass summit sign

East of the Teton Pass, WYO 22 runs along the border of the census-designated place (CDP) Wilson as it begins its nearly 2,000 feet (610 m) descent to Jackson on a winding easterly course. Approximately 1.8 miles (2.9 km) farther east, WYO 22 enters Wilson and then, roughly 2.2 miles (3.5 km) later, leaves the Bridger–Teton National Forest. About 2.4 miles (3.9 km) farther east, after crossing Fish Creek, WYO 22 begins running along the border of Wilson and the CDP of Moose Wilson Road.

Shortly thereafter, at about 13.51 miles (21.74 km) along its route, WYO 22 connects with the southern end of Wyoming Highway 390 (WYO 390 / Moose-Wilson Road) at a T intersection. (WYO 390 heads north through Moose Wilson Road and then on toward Teton Village and Moose.) Quickly thereafter, WYO 22 leaves both Wilson and Wilson Moose Road as it crosses the Snake River.

East of the Snake River, WYO 22 continues a winding east-southeasterly course for just under 4 miles (6.4 km) to enter Jackson and promptly reach its eastern terminus at US 26 / US 89 / US 189 / US 191 (West Broadway) at a T intersection. (US 26 / US 89 / US 189 / US 191 heads north through Jackson and on toward Teton National Park and Yellowstone National Park. It heads south toward Hoback Junction and Pinedale.)

== History ==
WYO 22 used to connect to former Alternate US 20, which began at U.S. Highway 20 in Sugar City, Idaho, following SH-33 until the state line, then connected with WYO 22. Alternate US 20 used to end at the state line, where it was redesignated as WYO 22, as Wyoming did not extend the route into the state. If that route had been extended, it would have taken over the entire route of WYO 22, to then overlap US 26 until it reached U.S. Highway 20 in Shoshoni.

On June 8, 2024, WYO 22 suffered a “catastrophic” failure when a portion of the road collapsed in a landslide at milepost 12.8 (43.5035°N 110.9756°W), less than five miles (8 km) by air from the Idaho border. A 600-foot (180 m) detour, constructed by a contractor of the Wyoming Department of Transportation, was opened to traffic on June 28, 2024. The detour has a sharper curvature and a grade of 11.2 percent (the original road built in the 1960s had a 10 percent grade), with a reduced speed limit of 20 miles per hour (32 km/h), but the former 60,000 pounds (27,000 kg) gross vehicle weight restriction remains.

== Major intersections ==
Actual mile markers increase from east to west.

The entire route is in Teton County.

| Location | mi | km | Destinations | Notes |
|---|---|---|---|---|
| | 0.000 | 0.000 | SH-33 west – Victor, Ashton, Idaho Falls | Continuation west into Idaho from western terminus |
| | 0.000 | 0.000 | Idaho-Wyoming state line | Western terminus 6,690 ft (2,040 m) |
| Wilson | 6.779 | 10.910 | Teton Pass, 8,435 ft (2,571 m) | |
| Wilson | 12.094 | 19.463 | Bridge over the Fish Creek | |
| Wilson–Moose Wilson Road line | 13.439 | 21.628 | WYO 390 north (Moose–Wilson Road) – Teton Village, Moose | Southern end of WYO 390; T intersection |
| Wilson–Moose Wilson Road line | 13.739 | 22.111 | Bridge over the Snake River | |
| | 16.834 | 27.092 | Spring Gulch Rd north | |
| Jackson | 17.494 | 28.154 | US 26 east / US 89 north / US 189 north / US 191 north (West Broadway) – Teton National Park, Yellowstone National Park US 26 west / US 89 south / US 189 south / US 191 south (West Broadway) – Hoback Junction, Pinedale | Eastern terminus T intersection 6,155 ft (1,876 m) |
1.000 mi = 1.609 km; 1.000 km = 0.621 mi

== See also ==
- List of state highways in Wyoming
