= Jackson micropolitan area, Wyoming–Idaho =

Area defined by the United States Census Bureau

Jackson Micropolitan Area Jackson, WY–ID USA
- Micropolitan Statistical Area
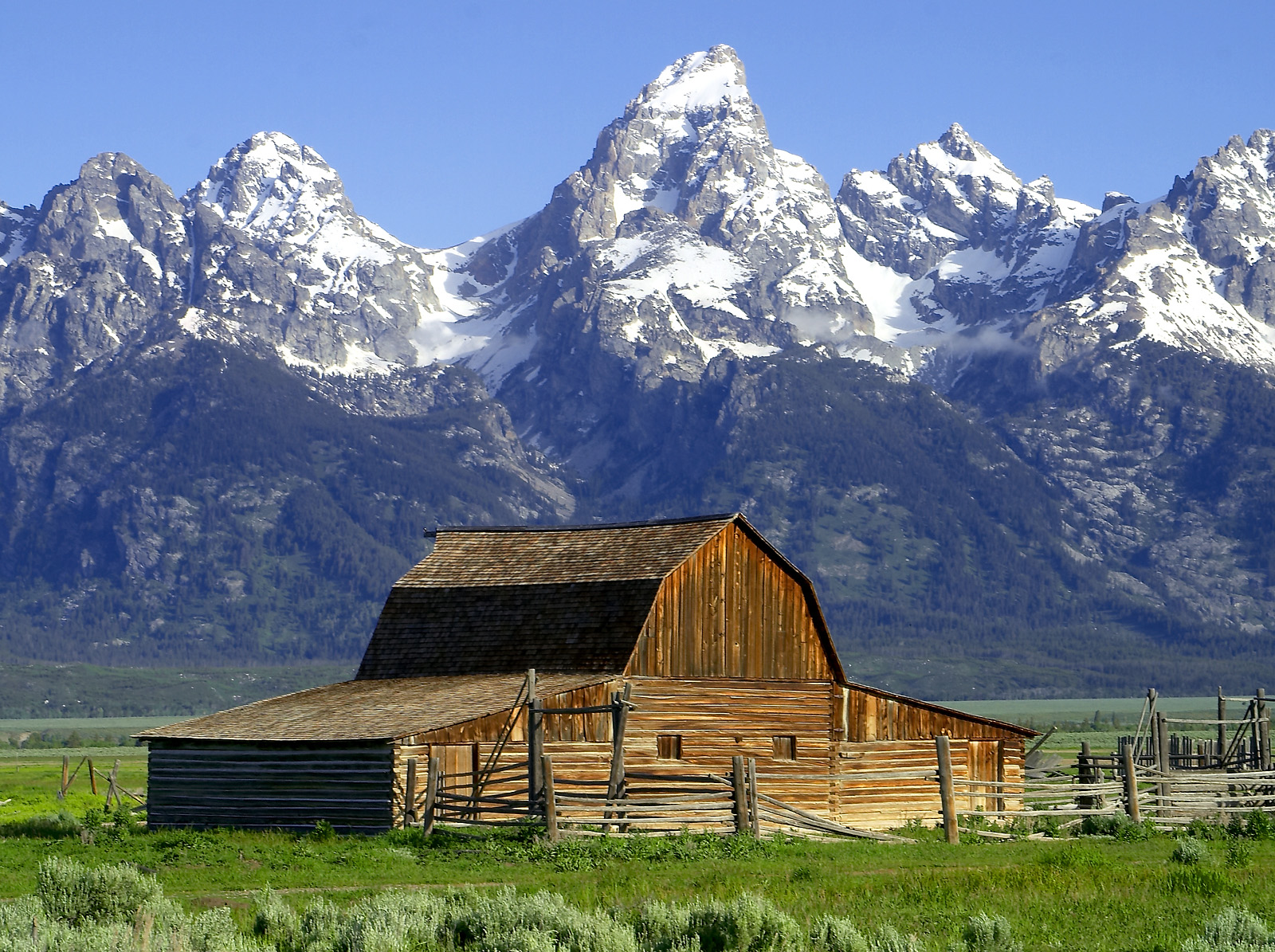
- The John Moulton Barn and the Teton Range
Map of Jackson, WY–ID μSA
Jackson, WY–ID μSA
Town of Jackson
Yellowstone National Park
Grand Teton National Park
- Country: United States
- State: Wyoming; Idaho
- Time zone: UTC−7 (MST)
  - Summer (DST): UTC−6 (MDT)

The Jackson Micropolitan Statistical Area, as defined by the United States Census Bureau, is an area consisting of two counties, one in Wyoming and one in Idaho, anchored by the town of Jackson.

As of the 2000 census, the area had a population of 24,250 (though a July 1, 2008 estimate placed the population at 29,209). The 2010 Census revealed that the population had grown to 31,464.

== Counties ==
- Teton County, Wyoming
- Teton County, Idaho

== Communities ==
- Alta, Wyoming (census-designated place)
- Driggs, Idaho
- Hoback, Wyoming (census-designated place)
- Jackson, Wyoming (principal town)
- Kelly, Wyoming (unincorporated)
- Moose, Wyoming (census-designated place is called Moose Wilson Road, Wyoming)
- Moran Junction, Wyoming (unincorporated)
- Rafter J Ranch, Wyoming (census-designated place)
- South Park, Wyoming (census-designated place)
- Teton Village, Wyoming (census-designated place)
- Tetonia, Idaho
- Victor, Idaho
- Wilson, Wyoming (census-designated place)

== Demographics ==
As of the census of 2000, there were 24,250 people, 9,766 households, and 5,638 families residing within the μSA. The racial makeup of the μSA was 93.03% White, 0.15% African American, 0.54% Native American, 0.45% Asian, 0.08% Pacific Islander, 4.63% from other races, and 1.12% from two or more races. Hispanic or Latino of any race were 7.79% of the population.

The median income for a household in the μSA was $48,291, and the median income for a family was $54,882. Males had a median income of $33,440 versus $25,688 for females. The per capita income for the μSA was $28,019.

== Media ==
The Jackson μSA is served by the following radio stations:

- KSGT (1340 AM) -- Country music
- KUWJ (90.3 FM) -- Wyoming Public Radio
- KIXM (92.3 FM) -- CHR-Pop
- KJAX (93.3 FM) -- Country music
- KZJH (95.3 FM) -- Alternative rock and classic rock
- KMTN (96.9 FM) -- Adult album alternative
- KWFO-FM (102.1 FM) -- Country music
- KDAD (103.7 FM) -- Classic country

== See also ==
- Wyoming census statistical areas
- Idaho census statistical areas
