= Teton Pass =

Mountain pass west of Jackson, Wyoming, USA

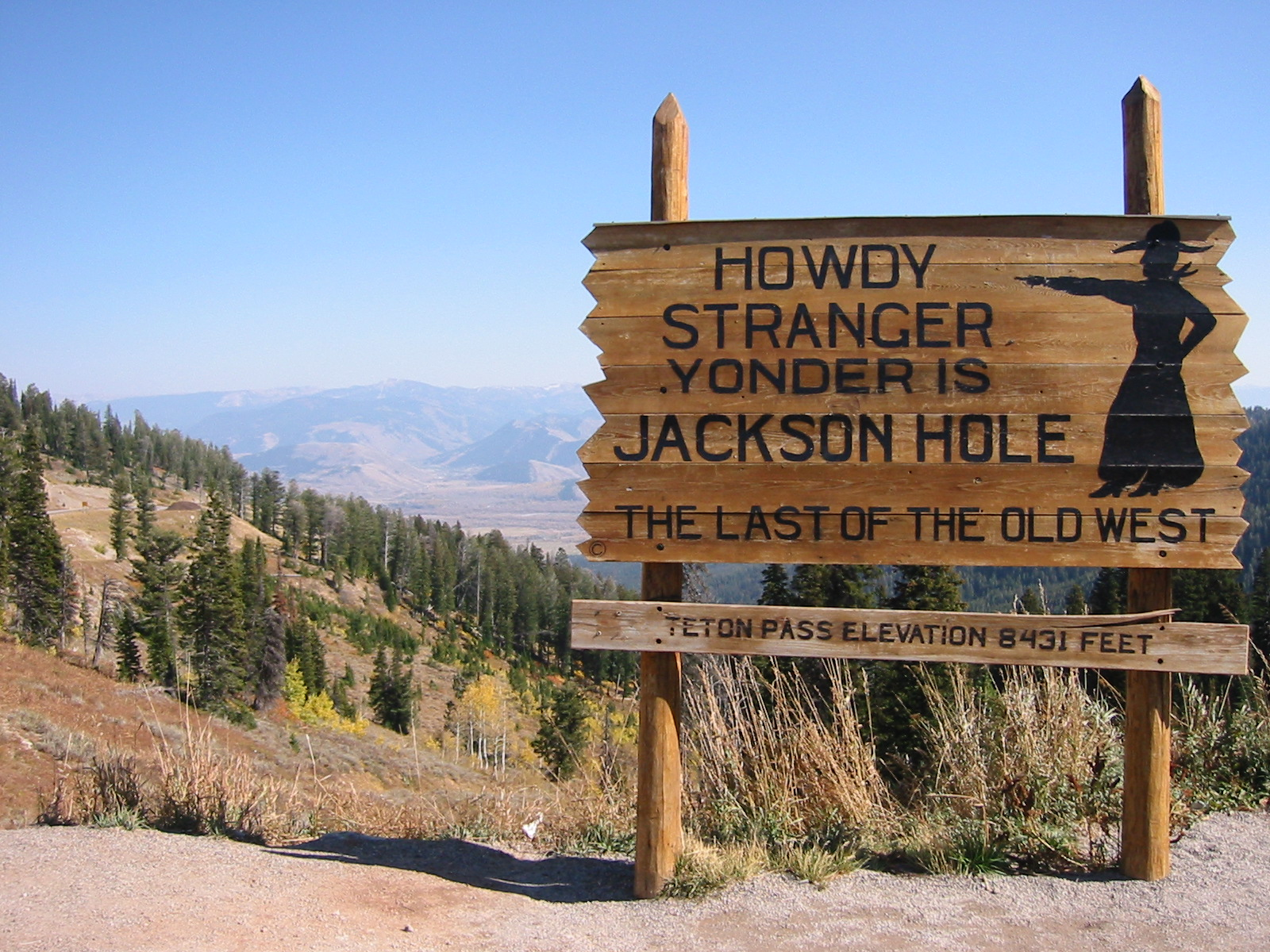
- Sign at Teton Pass looking towards Jackson Hole

- Location within the United States Location within Wyoming
- Elevation: 8,431 ft (2,570 m)
- Traversed by: WYO 22 (to SH-33)

Third Approach
- Location: Teton County, Wyoming, U.S.
- Range: Teton Range, Rocky Mountains
- Coordinates: 43°29′51″N 110°57′19″W
- Topo map: USGS Teton Pass

Teton Pass is a high mountain pass in the western United States, located at the southern end of the Teton Range in western Wyoming, between Wilson and Victor, Idaho. At an elevation of 8,431 feet (2,570 m) above sea level, the pass provides access from the Jackson Hole valley in Wyoming to the Teton Valley of eastern Idaho, including the access route to Grand Targhee Resort through Driggs, Idaho. To the south of the pass lies the Snake River Range.

The Teton Pass highway in Wyoming is designated as State Highway 22 and the pass is approximately eleven miles (18 km) out of Jackson. The maximum grade on the road is 10%, and several avalanche slide paths traverse the road along its length, including Glory Bowl slide area. During the winter months, the road is often closed in the early mornings for avalanche control by the Wyoming Department of Transportation. The area is popular for backcountry skiing, snowboarding, and mountain biking.

The pass is a few miles south of Grand Teton National Park; parts of the route to the pass are located in the Caribou-Targhee National Forest and in the Bridger-Teton National Forest. The small town of Wilson sits at the base of the east side of the pass, while Teton Village and the Jackson Hole Mountain Resort ski area are northeast of the pass.

At the state line at approximately 6,690 feet (2,040 m), it becomes Idaho State Highway 33 and continues northwest to Victor, then north to Driggs.

== 2024 collapse ==
On the morning of June 6, 2024, large cracks formed in the road near milepost 12.8 of the Teton Pass highway. The road was temporarily closed with the hope that the road could be patched. However, two days later on June 8, the cracked section of the Teton Pass highway collapsed.

Wyoming Governor Mark Gordon declared an emergency in the region, citing the significant impact the collapse had on commuters and the local residents and economy. The impact on commuters was significant, as the alternate route between Jackson and Victor, Idaho requires a >60 mile (97 km) detour.

On June 28, the highway reopened with a slight detour while work continues.
