= Game Creek =

Game Creek may refer to:

- Game Creek, Alaska, a census-designated place
- Game Creek (New Jersey), a tributary of the Salem River
- Game Creek (Teton County, Wyoming), a stream
