= Hardeman Barns =

- U.S. National Register of Historic Places
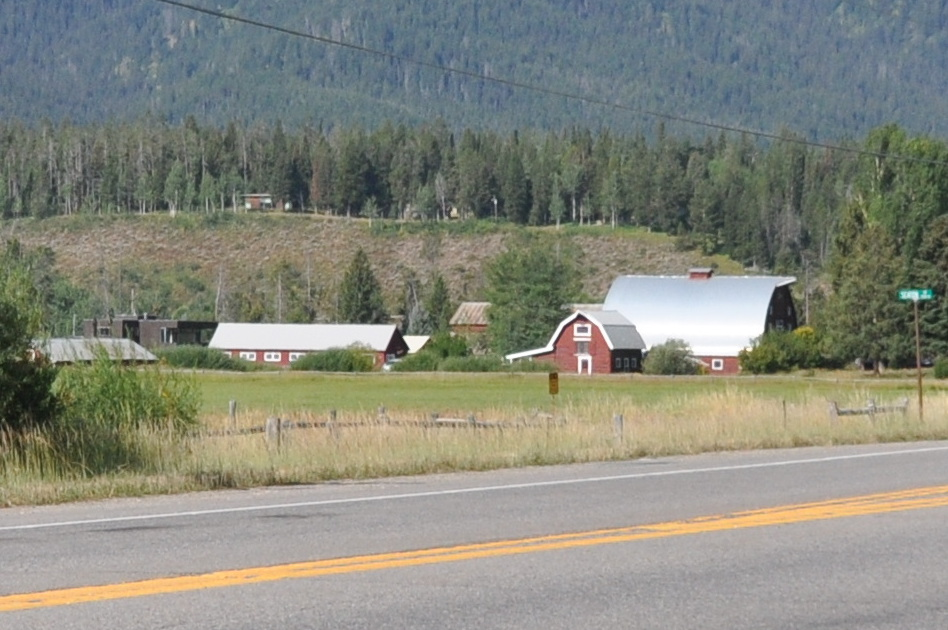

- Location within Wyoming Location within the United States
- Location: 5450 W. WY 22, Wilson, Wyoming, Teton County, Wyoming
- Coordinates: 43.4978°N 110.8699°W
- NRHP reference No.: 15000190
- Added to NRHP: April 28, 2015

The Hardeman Barns, in Wilson in Teton County, Wyoming, were listed on the National Register of Historic Places in 2015.

The main barn has a Gothic arch shape, and was designed and built by Wesley Bircher.

The barns with 27 acres property were sold to the Teton Raptor Center in 2017.
