= Darwin Ranch =

- U.S. National Register of Historic Places
- U.S. Historic district
- Location within Wyoming Location within the United States
- Location: 1 Kinky Creek Rd., Teton County, Wyoming
- Nearest city: Cora, Wyoming
- Coordinates: 43°24′44″N 110°09′41″W
- MPS: Ranches, Farms, and Homesteads in Wyoming, 1860-1960 MPS
- NRHP reference No.: 100005445
- Added to NRHP: April 27, 2021

The Darwin Ranch in Teton County, Wyoming near Cora, Wyoming is a guest ranch which was listed on the National Register of Historic Places in 2021.

== Description ==
It is a remote inholding within Bridger-Teton National Forest and provides easy access to forest lands and to the Gros Ventre Wilderness.

It has rental log cabins which, in 2021, command rental rates around $6,000/week.

== History ==
It was home of Fred Dorwin, a trader and fur trapper, and came to be called Darwin Ranch following appearance of it as that, by a typo, on a map.

It was managed for more than 50 years by Loring Woodman, after his parents purchased the ranch in 1964.

The property includes 15 log buildings and 9 structures. The buildings and structures were "all hand-constructed with logs, that are a combination of historic and a few modern structures designed to match the original buildings. Buildings on the site include the main lodge, guest cabins, and working ranch outbuildings. The site is surrounded by pine-tree covered mountains, with Kinky Creek and the Gros Ventre River winding through the property."

The property was deemed significant "for its representation of historic events related to Commerce and Settlement. As a homestead property, the ranch is an excellent example of early settlement in the American West. Early ranch residents supplemented their income in order to maintain the place with trapping in the surrounding mountains; an important form of early white settlement. The Darwin Ranch has more recently been sustained, though, as a guest or “dude” ranch, also an important commerce example. Guest ranches have long been a popular form of recreation. In the case of the Darwin Ranch, recreation is also extended to the use of the property by wealthy families for private seasonal enjoyment. Both uses of the ranch, as a commercial guest ranch and for private use, are important examples of how the commercial landscape of Teton County and other scenic areas in Wyoming developed to modern day."

It was also deemed significant for "its excellent example of Western Craftsman Architecture. The buildings and structures, both historic and more modern, maintain a high level of location, design, setting, materials, workmanship, feeling, and association for this unique western architecture. The combined western architecture with the traditional use of commerce from the settlement homestead era, create an excellent example of a significant historic property."

== Climate ==
According to the Köppen Climate Classification system, Darwin Ranch has a subarctic climate, abbreviated "Dfc" on climate maps. The hottest temperature recorded in was 87 °F (31 °C) on July 12, 2002, July 12, 2026, and July 13, 2026, while the coldest temperature recorded was −53 °F (−47 °C) on December 30, 1978 and January 1, 1979.

Climate data for Darwin Ranch, Wyoming, 1991–2020 normals, extremes 1974–present
Month	Jan	Feb	Mar	Apr	May	Jun	Jul	Aug	Sep	Oct	Nov	Dec	Year
Record high °F (°C)	49 (9)	51 (11)	62 (17)	70 (21)	78 (26)	83 (28)	87 (31)	85 (29)	82 (28)	74 (23)	62 (17)	50 (10)	87 (31)
Mean maximum °F (°C)	41.0 (5.0)	43.2 (6.2)	49.9 (9.9)	58.5 (14.7)	68.7 (20.4)	76.1 (24.5)	80.4 (26.9)	79.4 (26.3)	75.0 (23.9)	65.5 (18.6)	51.5 (10.8)	40.7 (4.8)	81.1 (27.3)
Mean daily maximum °F (°C)	26.4 (−3.1)	28.7 (−1.8)	36.2 (2.3)	42.8 (6.0)	53.9 (12.2)	64.0 (17.8)	72.1 (22.3)	70.9 (21.6)	62.4 (16.9)	48.3 (9.1)	34.5 (1.4)	25.3 (−3.7)	47.1 (8.4)
Daily mean °F (°C)	10.4 (−12.0)	12.3 (−10.9)	20.7 (−6.3)	29.5 (−1.4)	39.8 (4.3)	47.7 (8.7)	53.8 (12.1)	52.3 (11.3)	45.0 (7.2)	33.6 (0.9)	20.4 (−6.4)	10.2 (−12.1)	31.3 (−0.4)
Mean daily minimum °F (°C)	−5.6 (−20.9)	−4.1 (−20.1)	5.2 (−14.9)	16.1 (−8.8)	25.8 (−3.4)	31.5 (−0.3)	35.5 (1.9)	33.7 (0.9)	27.6 (−2.4)	18.8 (−7.3)	6.3 (−14.3)	−4.8 (−20.4)	15.5 (−9.2)
Mean minimum °F (°C)	−32.1 (−35.6)	−30.4 (−34.7)	−21.1 (−29.5)	−5.1 (−20.6)	11.2 (−11.6)	21.5 (−5.8)	27.2 (−2.7)	24.4 (−4.2)	14.6 (−9.7)	−0.3 (−17.9)	−19.6 (−28.7)	−31.8 (−35.4)	−37.1 (−38.4)
Record low °F (°C)	−53 (−47)	−49 (−45)	−40 (−40)	−21 (−29)	−9 (−23)	10 (−12)	15 (−9)	15 (−9)	−2 (−19)	−22 (−30)	−46 (−43)	−53 (−47)	−53 (−47)
Average precipitation inches (mm)	1.07 (27)	1.12 (28)	1.24 (31)	1.39 (35)	1.67 (42)	1.82 (46)	1.20 (30)	1.39 (35)	1.88 (48)	1.52 (39)	1.19 (30)	1.23 (31)	16.72 (422)
Average snowfall inches (cm)	14.5 (37)	15.7 (40)	16.0 (41)	13.3 (34)	5.2 (13)	1.4 (3.6)	0.0 (0.0)	0.0 (0.0)	1.9 (4.8)	8.6 (22)	15.1 (38)	16.9 (43)	108.6 (276.4)
Average precipitation days (≥ 0.01 in)	9.3	8.8	9.5	10.2	11.1	10.1	8.1	8.7	8.2	8.1	8.6	10.5	111.2
Average snowy days (≥ 0.1 in)	8.6	8.4	7.8	7.0	2.9	0.7	0.0	0.0	0.8	4.3	7.7	9.4	57.6
Source 1: NOAA
Source 2: National Weather Service

== See also ==
- National Register of Historic Places listings in Teton County, Wyoming
