= Rafter J Ranch, Wyoming =

- CDP
- Location within the state of Wyoming
- Coordinates: 43°25′54″N 110°47′33″W
- Country: United States
- State: Wyoming
- County: Teton

Area
  - Total: 0.66 sq mi (1.7 km^{2})
  - Land: 0.66 sq mi (1.7 km^{2})
  - Water: 0 sq mi (0.0 km^{2})
- Elevation: 6,063 ft (1,848 m)

Population (2010)
  - Total: 1,075
  - Density: 1,600/sq mi (630/km^{2})
- Time zone: UTC-7 (Mountain (MST))
  - Summer (DST): UTC-6 (MDT)
- Area code: 307
- FIPS code: 56-63100
- GNIS feature ID: 2409121

Rafter J Ranch is a census-designated place (CDP) in Teton County, Wyoming, United States. The population was 1,075 at the 2010 census. It is part of the Jackson, WY–ID Micropolitan Statistical Area.

== Geography ==
According to the United States Census Bureau, the CDP has a total area of 0.7 square mile (1.7 km^{2}), all land.

== Demographics ==
As of the census of 2000, there were 1,138 people, 432 households, and 304 families residing in the CDP. The population density was 1,736.2 inhabitants per square mile (670.4/km^{2}). There were 466 housing units at an average density of 711.0 per square mile (274.5/km^{2}). The racial makeup of the CDP was 97.36% White, 0.35% African American, 0.18% Native American, 0.79% Asian, 0.18% from other races, and 1.14% from two or more races. Hispanic or Latino of any race were 1.85% of the population.

There were 432 households, out of which 39.4% had children under the age of 18 living with them, 61.6% were married couples living together, 6.9% had a female householder with no husband present, and 29.4% were non-families. 16.9% of all households were made up of individuals, and 3.7% had someone living alone who was 65 years of age or older. The average household size was 2.63 and the average family size was 2.99.

In the CDP, the population was spread out, with 26.5% under the age of 18, 6.9% from 18 to 24, 34.3% from 25 to 44, 28.4% from 45 to 64, and 4.0% who were 65 years of age or older. The median age was 37 years. For every 100 females, there were 110.7 males. For every 100 females age 18 and over, there were 109.0 males.

The median income for a household in the CDP was $63,199, and the median income for a family was $65,781. Males had a median income of $37,125 versus $31,771 for females. The per capita income for the CDP was $28,078. About 6.2% of families and 5.2% of the population were below the poverty line, including 6.1% of those under age 18 and none of those age 65 or over.

== Education ==
Public education in the community of Rafter J Ranch is provided by Teton County School District #1.
