= Alan Hirschfield =

American film studio executive

- Born: Alan James Hirschfield; October 10, 1935; New York City, New York, U.S.
- Died: January 15, 2015 (aged 79); Wilson, Wyoming, U.S.
- Education: University of Oklahoma (BA); Harvard University (MA)
- Occupation: Media executive
- Known for: CEO of Columbia Pictures; Chairman of 20th Century Fox
- Spouse: Berte Schindelheim
- Children: 3

Alan James Hirschfield (October 10, 1935 – January 15, 2015) was an American film studio executive. Hirschfield was the CEO of Columbia Pictures from 1973 to 1978 and the chairman of 20th Century Fox from 1982 until 1986. Outside of the film industry, Hirschfield helped Clive Davis establish Arista Records in the 1970s.

== Early life and education ==
Hirschfield was born to a Jewish family in New York City on October 10, 1935, to Norman and Betty Hirschfield. The family moved to Oklahoma City when he was three-years old, where his father worked for Allen & Company's natural gas operations. Hirschfield received a bachelor's degree from the University of Oklahoma and a master's degree from Harvard Business School.

== Career ==
After school, Hirschfield went to work for Allen & Company (he was a close friend with its founder Charles Allen Jr.) and after Allen & Company took a financial stake in the film studio Warner Bros., Hirschfield was appointed financial vice president.

In 1973, again after Allen & Co took a financial stake in Columbia Pictures, Hirschfield was appointed CEO. In 1978, Hirschfield was forced out of Columbia after being pressured by members of the board of directors, chiefly Herb Allen, into the disastrous reinstating of David Begelman, a studio executive who had embezzled $61,000 from Columbia, despite being vehemently against it. In 1981, Hirschfield was hired by Marvin Davis to be the chairman of 20th Century Fox; he resigned in 1984 and was replaced by Barry Diller. From 1990 to 1992, Hirschfield was a co-CEO and investment banker for the former Financial News Network. He was also the co-CEO of the Data Broadcasting Corp from 1992 to 2000.

The Begelman embezzlement and its aftermath were the subject of the best-selling 1982 non-fiction book Indecent Exposure by David McClintick.

In 1992, he opposed his friend, attorney Gerry Spence's decision to defend Randy Weaver on charges following the Ruby Ridge siege.

== Personal life and death ==
In 1962, Hirschfield married Berte Schindelheim; they had three children: Scott Hirschfield; Marc Hirschfield; and Laura Hirschfield. Hirschfield died from natural causes at his home in Wilson, Wyoming, on January 15, 2015, at the age of 79.

Hirschfield was also a prolific collector of Native American art. The collection includes items from a variety of tribes and cultures from the Plains and Plateau regions as well as from the Northwest and Southwest. The 2012 publication, Living with American Indian Art: The Hirschfield Collection, provides an in depth examination of the collection and its history.
