= Teton County School District Number 1 =

School district in Wyoming, United States

Teton County School District No. 1 is a public school district based in Jackson, Wyoming, United States.

== Geography ==
Teton County School District No. 1 serves all of Teton County (in previous eras, this excluded the Yellowstone National Park portion, which was not part of any district), including the following communities:

- Incorporated places
  - Town of Jackson
- Census-designated places (Note: All census-designated places are unincorporated.)
  - Alta
  - Hoback
  - Moose Wilson Road
  - Rafter J Ranch
  - South Park
  - Teton Village
  - Wilson
- Unincorporated places
  - Kelly
  - Moose
  - Moran

As of 2014 the portion of Yellowstone Park in the county and Grand Teton National Park are in this district.

== Schools ==
=== High schools ===
- Grades 9-12
  - Jackson Hole High School
  - Summit High School (Alternative)

=== Middle school ===
- Grades 6-8
  - Jackson Hole Middle School

=== Elementary schools ===
- Grades K-5
  - Jackson Elementary School
  - Colter Elementary School
  - Kelly Elementary School
  - Moran Elementary School
  - Munger Mountain Elementary School
  - Wilson Elementary School
- Grades K-6
  - Alta Elementary School

== Student demographics ==
The following figures are as of October 1, 2008.

- Total District Enrollment: 2,294
- Student enrollment by gender
  - Male: 1,168 (50.92%)
  - Female: 1,126 (49.08%)
- Student enrollment by ethnicity
  - White (not Hispanic): 1,693 (73.80%)
  - Hispanic: 546 (23.80%)
  - Asian or Pacific Islander: 39 (1.70%)
  - American Indian or Alaskan Native: 9 (0.39%)
  - Black (not Hispanic): 7 (0.31%)

== See also ==
- List of school districts in Wyoming
