= Rosencrans Cabin Historic District =

Historic district in Wyoming, United States

- U.S. National Register of Historic Places
- U.S. Historic district
- Location within Wyoming Location within the United States
- Nearest city: Moran, Wyoming
- Coordinates: 43°50′0″N 110°20′44″W
- Built: 1915
- Architect: Rudolf (Rosie) Rosencrans
- NRHP reference No.: 80004056
- Added to NRHP: August 6, 1980

The Rosencrans Cabin is part of a small historic district comprising five log buildings on three acres in Bridger-Teton National Forest, just east of Grand Teton National Park. The cabin was used by Rudolph "Rosie" Rosencrans, who played a role in the development of Teton National Forest and who later became a U.S. Forest Service administrator in the early 20th century. Rosencrans was buried at this location.

Rudolf "Rosie" Rosencrans was a native of Austria, graduating from the University of Vienna and qualified as an ocean navigator. He first visited Jackson Hole in 1900 and returned in 1903 to become a ranger in the Teton Division of the Yellowstone Timberland Reserve. Rosencrans built the first ranger station in the district, which was replaced in 1915 with the present complex. Rosencrans retired from the Forest Service in 1928 because of failing eyesight, and died in 1970 at 94.

Located to the west of Rosie's Ridge, the log cabin at the center of the district is about 33 feet (10 m) by 22 feet (6.7 m). The cabin contains a kitchen on the west side, with a bedroom and bathroom in an enclosed porch on the north side. The living room features a wood-burning stove. Another bedroom is in a lean-to addition on the east side.

Other buildings in the district include two log storage buildings, a log horse barn, and a privy. Rosencrans' grave is to the northeast of the barn, enclosed by a pole fence.

The cabin and surrounding structures are near the Forest Service's Old Blackrock Office, which was also associated with Rosencrans.

The district was placed on the National Register of Historic Places in 1980.
