= Squirrel Meadows Guard Station =

United States historic place in Targhee National Forest

- U.S. National Register of Historic Places
- Location within Wyoming Location within the United States
- Location: Ashton, Idaho
- Coordinates: 44°3′48″N 111°1′14″W
- Built: 1934
- Architect: Region 4 USFS
- NRHP reference No.: 90000149
- Added to NRHP: October 4, 1990

The Squirrel Meadow Guard Station is a ranger station in the backcountry of Targhee National Forest in Wyoming. The original facility was established in 1907, with the present structures built in 1934. The log cabin station is an example of a standard US Forest Service backcountry patrol structure.

The site comprises a log cabin and an outhouse. A second cabin belonging to the state of Wyoming is nearby, and while compatible in design, is not included in the historic designation. The cabin was built using Forest Service Standard Plans R4-7 (cabin) and R4-70 (outhouse). It is one of only two R4-7 cabins in Wyoming. The cabin is a two-room structure with a kitchen at the west end, a living space at the east end, and a screened porch at the far east end. Wall and roof construction uses lodgepole pine logs. A galvanized roof has been installed over the original wood roof shingles. A well with a hand pump in front of the cabin dates to the 1980s. The stove in the kitchen area is a wood-burning cooking stove. There is a wood-burning stove in the living area for heat.

The Squirrel Meadows Cabin is rented to the public as a visitor accommodation.
