= Craig Thomas Discovery and Visitor Center =

Visitor center in Wyoming

Coordinates: 43°39′11.9″N 110°43′4.8″W

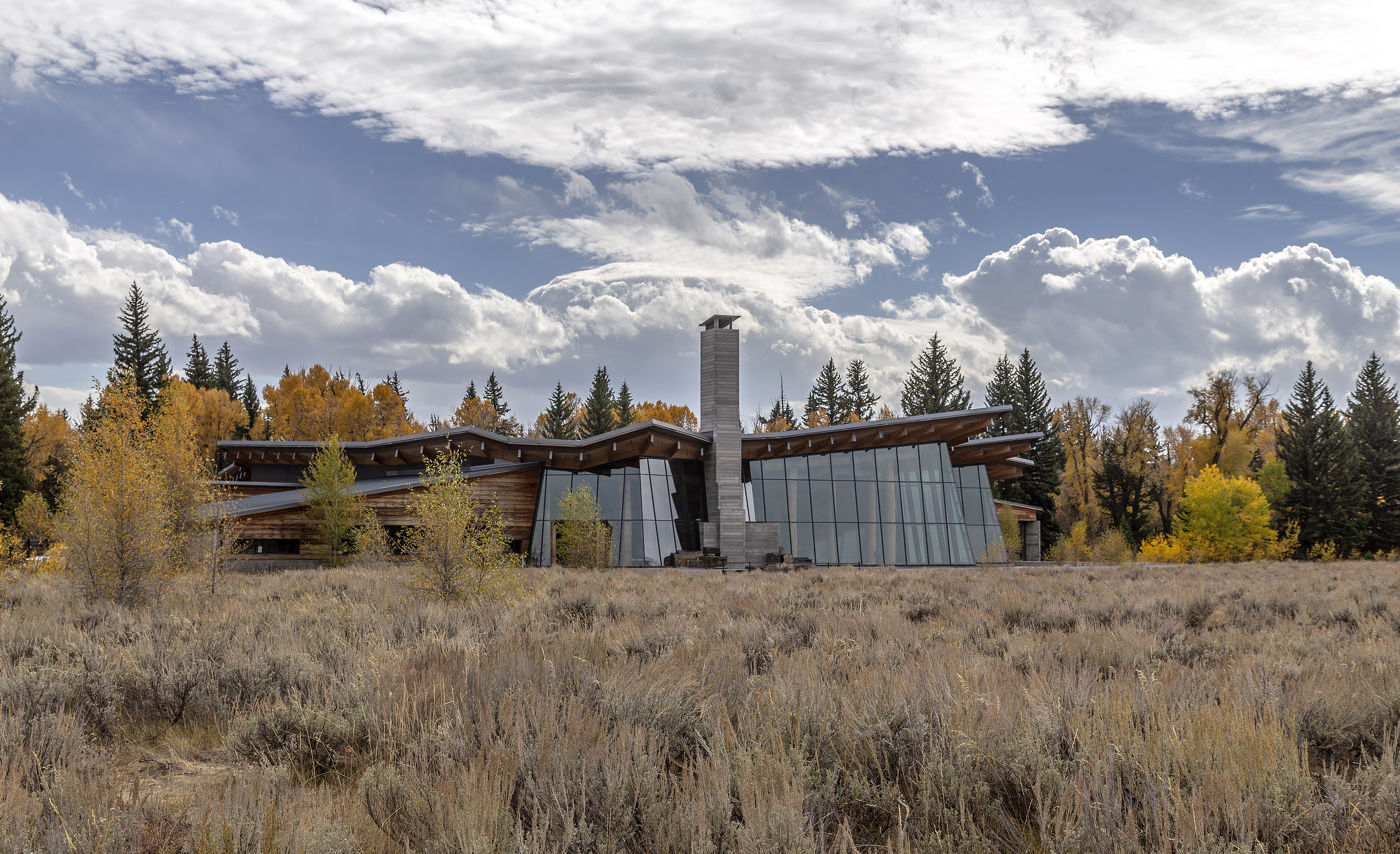
Craig Thomas Discovery and Visitor Center opened in 2007

The Craig Thomas Discovery and Visitor Center is located in Grand Teton National Park in the U.S. state of Wyoming. The visitor center is open from early spring until the fall.

Opened in 2007 to replace an old and inadequate facility, the Craig Thomas Discovery and Visitor Center was built with a combination of federal grants and private donations and is adjacent to the park headquarters in Moose, Wyoming. Fund raising efforts for an adjoining 154-seat auditorium were nearing completion as of 2011. Exhibits include the park's natural history, mountaineering and Western artifacts.
