= South Park, Wyoming =

- CDP
- Location within the state of Wyoming
- Coordinates: 43°24′25″N 110°46′16″W
- Country: United States
- State: Wyoming
- County: Teton

Area
  - Total: 11.7 sq mi (30 km^{2})
  - Land: 11.7 sq mi (30 km^{2})
  - Water: 0.0 sq mi (0 km^{2})
- Elevation: 6,056 ft (1,846 m)

Population (2010)
  - Total: 1,731
  - Density: 148/sq mi (57.1/km^{2})
- Time zone: UTC-7 (Mountain (MST))
  - Summer (DST): UTC-6 (MDT)
- Area code: 307
- FIPS code: 56-71947
- GNIS feature ID: 2408769

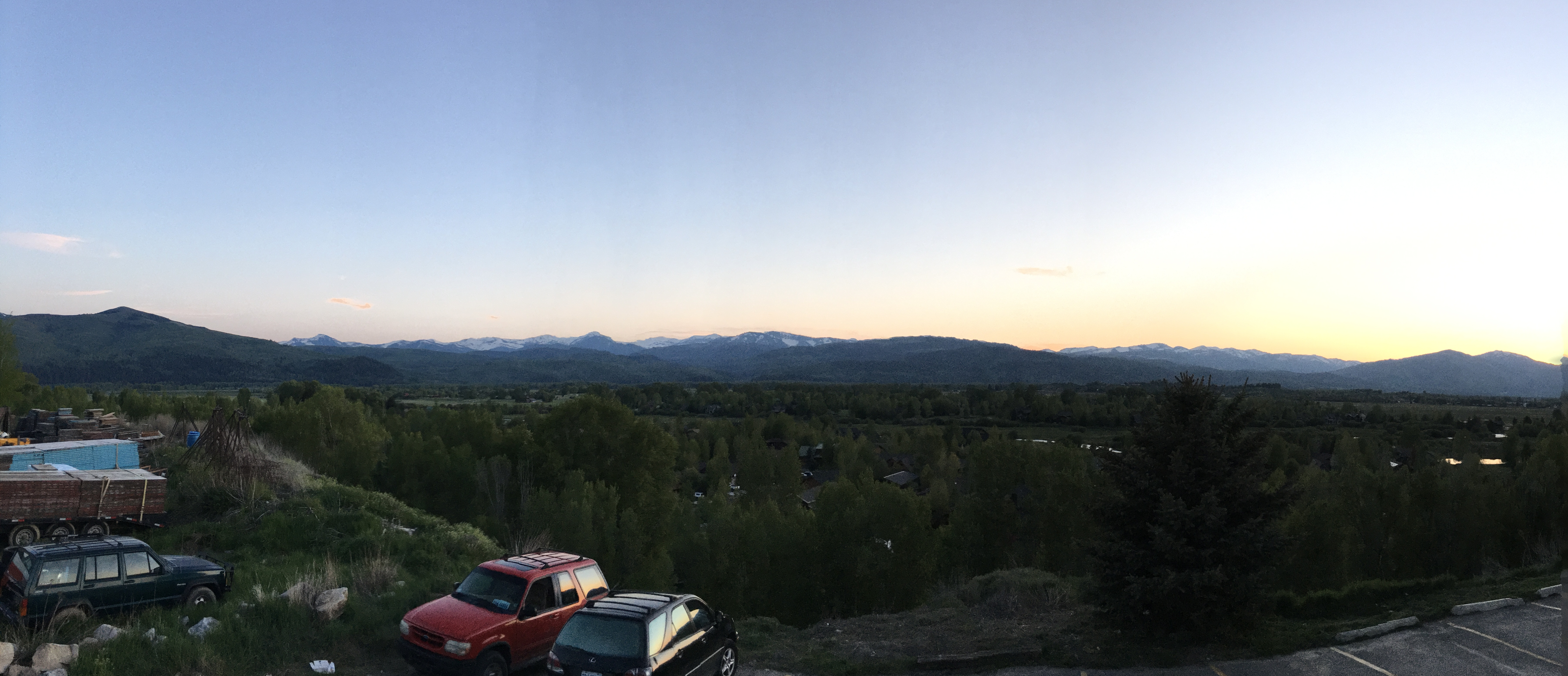
South Park

South Park is a census-designated place (CDP) in Teton County, Wyoming, United States. The population was 1,731 at the 2010 census. It is part of the Jackson, WY–ID Micropolitan Statistical Area.

== Geography ==
According to the United States Census Bureau, the CDP has a total area of 11.7 square miles (30.3 km^{2}), all land.

== Demographics ==
As of the census of 2000, there were 864 people, 350 households, and 234 families residing in the CDP. The population density was 75.9 inhabitants per square mile (29.3/km^{2}). There were 392 housing units at an average density of 34.4 per square mile (13.3/km^{2}). The racial makeup of the CDP was 97.57% White, 0.12% Native American, 0.12% Pacific Islander, 0.12% from other races, and 2.08% from two or more races. Hispanic or Latino of any race were 0.69% of the population.

There were 350 households, out of which 32.3% had children under the age of 18 living with them, 58.3% were married couples living together, 6.9% had a female householder with no husband present, and 32.9% were non-families. 20.0% of all households were made up of individuals, and 3.1% had someone living alone who was 65 years of age or older. The average household size was 2.47 and the average family size was 2.91.

In the CDP, the population was spread out, with 24.1% under the age of 18, 4.5% from 18 to 24, 33.6% from 25 to 44, 31.9% from 45 to 64, and 5.9% who were 65 years of age or older. The median age was 38 years. For every 100 females, there were 100.0 males. For every 100 females age 18 and over, there were 102.5 males.

The median income for a household in the CDP was $63,864, and the median income for a family was $70,625. Males had a median income of $42,837 versus $33,836 for females. The per capita income for the CDP was $32,458. About 4.6% of families and 3.6% of the population were below the poverty line, including none of those under age 18 and 22.2% of those age 65 or over.

== Education ==
Public education in the community of South Park is provided by Teton County School District #1.
