= Game Creek (Teton County, Wyoming) =

- U.S. National Register of Historic Places
- Nearest city: Address restricted, Jackson, Wyoming vic.
- NRHP reference No.: 100004708
- Added to NRHP: December 2, 2019

Game Creek is a stream in Teton County, Wyoming. It is also the name of a 2019 listing on the National Register of Historic Places.

The National Register listing is for an archeological site that was investigated in 2001 and subsequently. The site was investigated given plans for highway construction in the area. An extensive report was published in 2017.

Teton County Parks and Recreation reports on grooming of cross-country ski trails in the Game Creek area and other areas.

A grizzly bear was reported in Game Creek in 2017.
