= Queen's Laundry Bath House =

- U.S. National Register of Historic Places
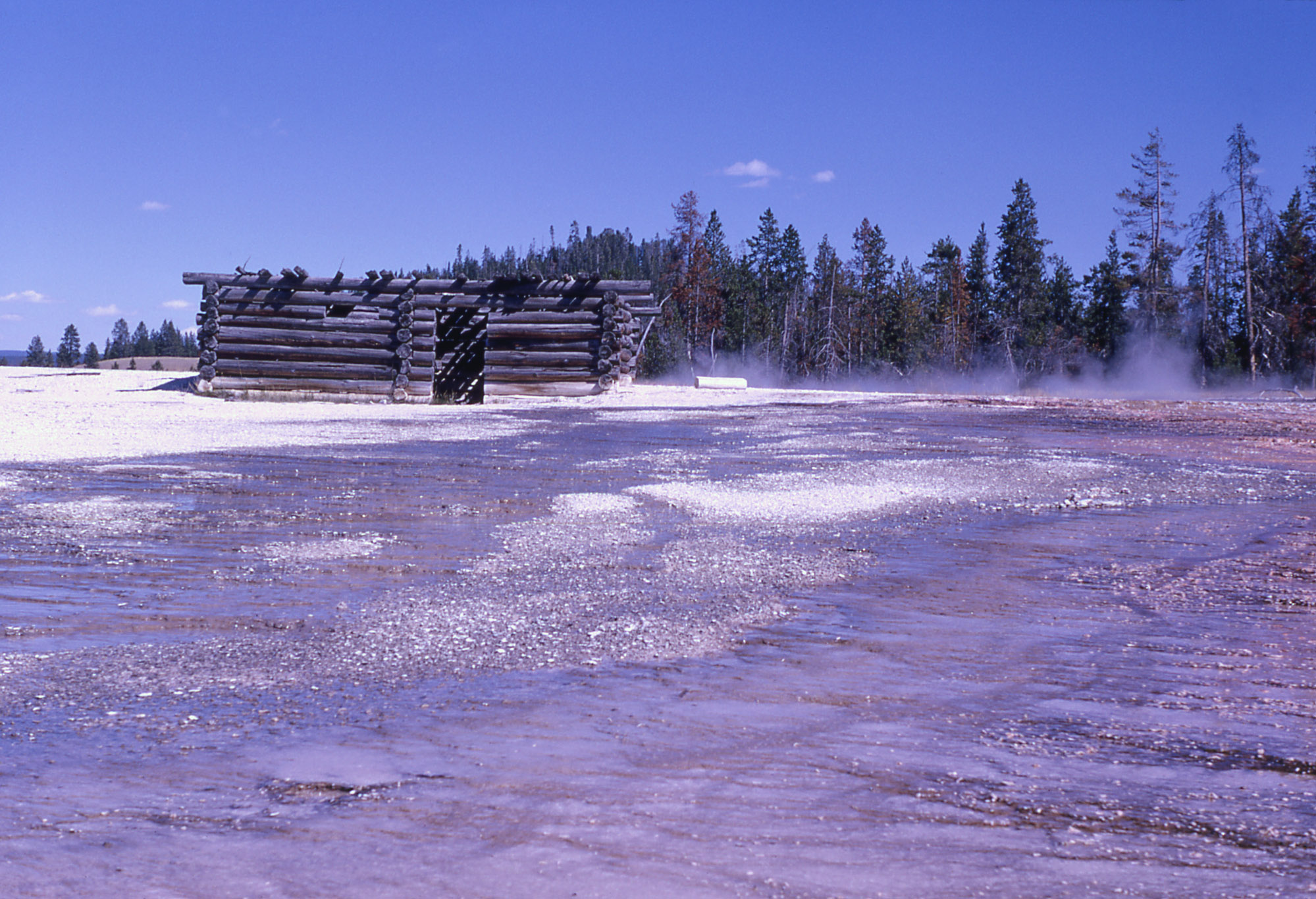
- Queen's Laundry Bathhouse in 1964

- Location within Wyoming Location within the United States
- Location: Yellowstone National Park, Wyoming
- Coordinates: 44°33′49″N 110°52′14″W
- Built: 1881
- NRHP reference No.: 01000790
- Added to NRHP: July 25, 2001

The Queen's Laundry Bath House is a ruinous structure in Yellowstone National Park. The log building sits on the edge of the Queen's Laundry thermal feature in the Lower Geyser Basin. The water at this location is somewhat cooler than the norm, allowing early tourists to bathe. Begun by Yellowstone park superintendent Philetus Norris, the bath house was intended to have two rooms and a dirt-covered roof, but was never completed. Begun in 1881, it may be the oldest extant park visitor structure in the National Park Service system.

The ruins are located near the western end of Sentinel Meadows on a travertine mound formed by Queen's Laundry Spring. The structure measures 8.16 feet (2.49 m) by 19 feet (5.8 m), and had a low shed roof. The log walls were vee-notched. The roof structure is incomplete and gradually deteriorating, and was intended to be covered with earth.. The interior comprises two rooms of approximately equal size, which are in the process of gradually being covered by hot springs deposits.

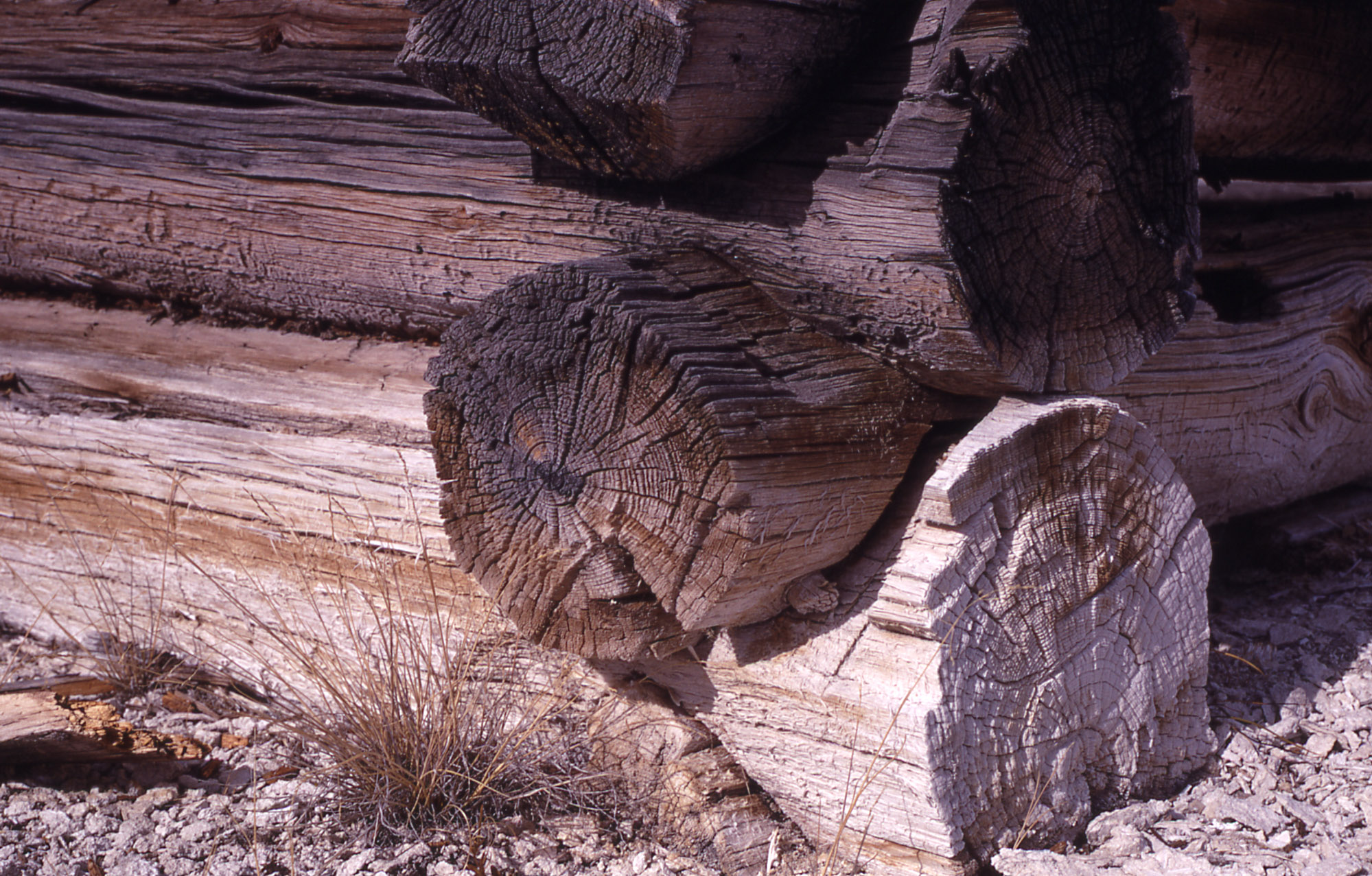
Silicified logs at the Queen's Laundry Bath House, 1969

In his 1881 annual report, Superintendent Norris proposed the construction of the bath house for public use. After the structure was partly built, Superintendent Patrick H. Conger took over management and declined to pursue its completion. The park proposed removing it entirely in 1964, but opted to retain it as the only example of a park structure from Yellowstone's early period of civilian management.
