= KDAD =

- Victor, Idaho; United States
- Frequency: 103.7 MHz
- Branding: 103.7 The Range

Programming
- Format: Classic Country

Ownership
- Owner: Jackson Radio Group, Inc.

History
- First air date: 2004; 22 years ago
- Former call signs: KKTN (2004–2006); KXMP (2006); KVRG (2006–2016)
- Call sign meaning: Daddy

Technical information
- Licensing authority: FCC
- Facility ID: 88087
- Class: C3
- ERP: 821 watts
- HAAT: 331 meters (1,086 ft)
- Transmitter coordinates: 43°29′27″N 110°57′16″W

Links
- Public license information: Public file; LMS

KDAD (103.7 FM) is a radio station broadcasting a classic country format. Licensed to Victor, Idaho, United States, the station is owned by Jackson Radio Group, Inc.

== History ==
The station first signed on the air in 2004. Since its inception, the frequency has undergone several identity changes to align with shifting market demands in the Teton region: KKTN, the original call sign assigned on October 13, 2004. KXMP, briefly held in 2006. KVRG, adopted on November 1, 2006, and held for a decade. Finally, KDAD, adopted on September 8, 2016. This final adoption marked its transition to the "Range" branding and its current country identity. On August 1, 2022, the FCC’s Media Bureau entered into a Consent Decree with the licensees associated with Northeast Broadcasting Company, resolving an investigation into unauthorized transfers of control and the failure to file required ownership and renewal documentation.

The investigation centered on the death of the stations' ultimate owner, Edward Silberberg, and the subsequent failure of the company to notify the FCC or seek approval for the transfer of control to his estate. The FCC found that the stations continued to operate for several years after the owner's death without the legal transfer of the licenses to the heirs or executors, a violation of Section 310(d) of the Communications Act. The company failed to file biennial ownership reports and maintain the Online Public Inspection Files for several stations, including KDAD and KIXM.

In September 2023, KDAD was part of an ownership transfer in the Jackson market. Northeast Broadcasting's Jackson Radio Group sold the station to Ted Austin’s Madison Radio Partners LLLP for $150,000. This acquisition was completed alongside sister station KIXM (iMix 92.3).
