= Moose Wilson Road, Wyoming =

- Census-designated place
- Location within the state of Wyoming
- Coordinates: 43°30′55″N 110°50′34″W
- Country: United States
- State: Wyoming
- County: Teton

Area
  - Total: 6.98 sq mi (18.1 km^{2})
  - Land: 6.7 sq mi (17 km^{2})
  - Water: 0.28 sq mi (0.73 km^{2})
- Elevation: 6,194 ft (1,888 m)

Population (2020)
  - Total: 1,661
  - Density: 250/sq mi (96/km^{2})
- Time zone: UTC-7 (Mountain (MST))
  - Summer (DST): UTC-6 (MDT)
- Area code: 307
- FIPS code: 56-54402
- GNIS feature ID: 2408865

Moose Wilson Road is a census-designated place (CDP) in Teton County, Wyoming, United States. The population was 1,661 at the 2020 census. It is part of the Jackson, WY–ID Micropolitan Statistical Area.

== Geography ==
The Moose Wilson Road CDP includes the area around the Moose post office, private inholdings on the east side of the Snake River, and extends as far north as Shadow Mountain.

== Demographics ==
Historical population
Census	Pop.	Note	%±
2000	1,439		—
2010	1,821		26.5%
2020	1,661		−8.8%

As of the census of 2000, there were 1,439 people, 625 households, and 351 families residing in the CDP. The population density was 214.1 inhabitants per square mile (82.7/km^{2}). There were 1,183 housing units at an average density of 176.0 per square mile (68.0/km^{2}). The racial makeup of the CDP was 96.94% White, 0.21% African American, 0.28% Native American, 0.35% Asian, 1.18% from other races, and 1.04% from two or more races. Hispanic or Latino of any race were 2.02% of the population.

There were 625 households, out of which 24.6% had children under the age of 18 living with them, 50.6% were married couples living together, 3.8% had a female householder with no husband present, and 43.7% were non-families. 28.0% of all households were made up of individuals, and 2.4% had someone living alone who was 65 years of age or older. The average household size was 2.30 and the average family size was 2.79.

In the CDP, the population was spread out, with 19.1% under the age of 18, 6.5% from 18 to 24, 34.3% from 25 to 44, 32.7% from 45 to 64, and 7.4% who were 65 years of age or older. The median age was 39 years. For every 100 females, there were 111.9 males. For every 100 females age 18 and over, there were 115.6 males.

The median income for a household in the CDP was $56,842, and the median income for a family was $114,552. Males had a median income of $43,750 versus $35,938 for females. The per capita income for the CDP was $71,291. About 2.0% of families and 5.5% of the population were below the poverty line, including 3.2% of those under age 18 and none of those age 65 or over.

== Education ==
Public education in the community of Moose Wilson Road is provided by Teton County School District #1.
