= KIXM =

- Victor, Idaho; United States
- Broadcast area: Jackson Hole
- Frequency: 92.3 MHz
- Branding: iMix 92.3

Programming
- Format: Top 40 (CHR)

Ownership
- Owner: Jackson Radio Group, Inc.
- Sister stations: KHAT, KIMX, KRQU, KYAP

History
- Former call signs: KMQS (1997–2006); KYPT (2006–2006); KRVQ (2006–2010)

Technical information
- Licensing authority: FCC
- Facility ID: 87972
- Class: C3
- ERP: 820 watts
- HAAT: 331 meters (1,086 ft)
- Transmitter coordinates: 43°29′27″N 110°57′16″W
- Translator: 101.7 K269GA (Wilson)

Links
- Public license information: Public file; LMS
- Webcast: Listen Live
- Website: https://www.imixjackson.com

KIXM (92.3 FM, "iMix 92.3") is a radio station broadcasting a Top 40 (CHR) format. Licensed to Victor, Idaho, United States, the station is owned by Jackson Radio Group, Inc.

== History ==
The station was originally assigned the call sign KMQS on August 14, 1997.

For much of its recent history, KIXM was part of Northeast Broadcasting’s Jackson Radio Group. In September 2023, the station was part of a major market realignment when it was sold to veteran broadcaster Ted Austin.

Austin acquired KIXM for $250,000 through his entity Snake River Broadcasting LLLP. The deal was a package that included sister station KDAD (Classic Country), which was purchased through Austin's Madison Radio Partners LLLP. This move solidified the "iMix" brand under local regional management after years of out-of-state ownership.
