= Wilson, Wyoming =

- CDP
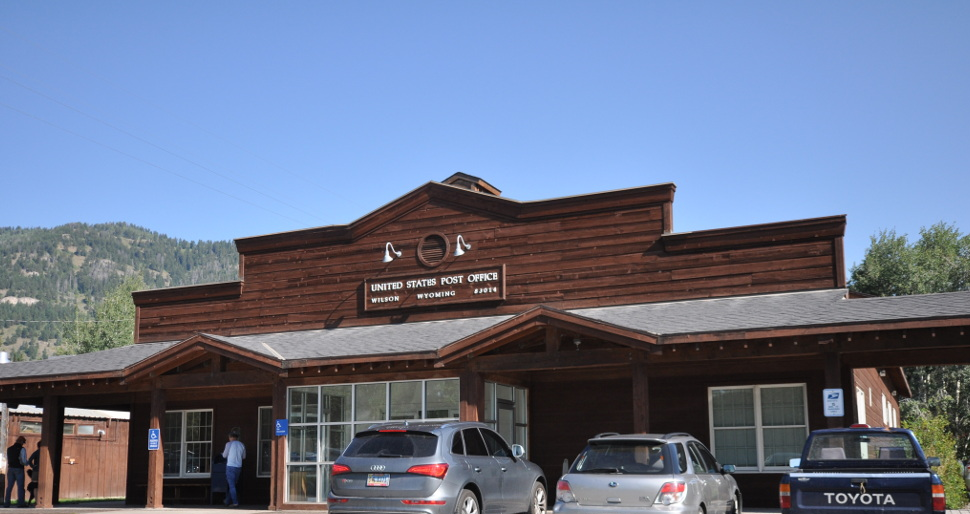
- Wilson, Wyoming Post Office, August 2017

- Location within Wyoming
- Coordinates: 43°29′11″N 110°52′45″W
- Country: United States
- State: Wyoming
- County: Teton

Area
  - Total: 23.44 sq mi (60.7 km^{2})
  - Land: 22.96 sq mi (59.5 km^{2})
  - Water: 0.48 sq mi (1.2 km^{2})
- Elevation: 6,148 ft (1,874 m)

Population (2020)
  - Total: 1,567
  - Density: 68.25/sq mi (26.35/km^{2})
- Time zone: UTC-7 (Mountain (MST))
  - Summer (DST): UTC-6 (MDT)
- ZIP code: 83014
- Area code: 307
- FIPS code: 56-83765
- GNIS feature ID: 1604543

Wilson is a census-designated place (CDP) in Teton County, Wyoming, United States. The population was 1,567 at the 2020 census, up from 1,482 in 2010. It is part of the Jackson, WY–ID Micropolitan Statistical Area.

Wilson was pioneered in 1889 by Elijah Nicholas Wilson, known for having lived with the Shoshone Indians as a boy in the 1850s. His book, The White Indian Boy, describes his experiences, including his time as a rider for the Pony Express. The town was later named in his honor. It sits at the base of Teton Pass, just northwest of Jackson on State Highway 22.

== Geography ==
Wilson is located at 43°29′11″N 110°52′45″W (43.4863, -110.8793). At an elevation of 6,148 feet (1,874 m) above sea level.

According to the United States Census Bureau, the CDP has a total area of 23.44 square miles (60.7 km^{2}), 22.96 square miles (59.5 km^{2}) of it land and 0.5 square miles (1.3 km^{2}) of it water (2.05%).

== Demographics ==
As of the census of 2000, there were 1,294 people, 563 households, and 305 families residing in the CDP. The population density was 56.0 inhabitants per square mile (21.6/km^{2}). There were 706 housing units, at an average density of 30.5 per square mile (11.8/km^{2}). The racial makeup of the CDP was 97.68% White, 0.08% African American, 0.15% Native American, 0.46% Asian, 0.54% from other races, and 1.08% from two or more races. Hispanic or Latino of any race were 1.00% of the population.

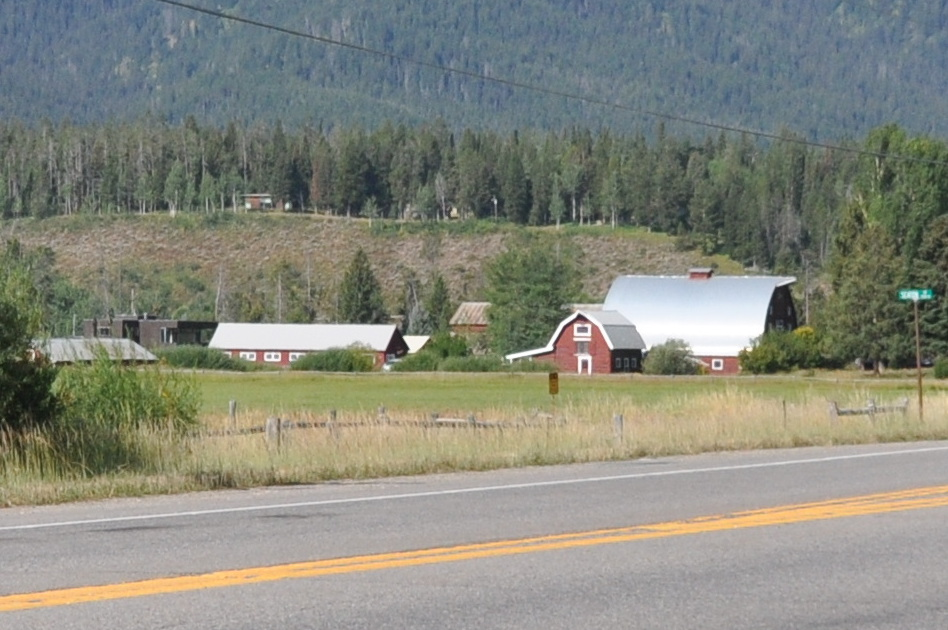
Hardeman Barns along Wyoming Highway 22 in Wilson, August 2017

There were 563 households, out of which 25.2% had children under the age of 18 living with them. 47.6% were married couples living together, 3.7% had a female householder with no husband present, and 45.8% were non-families. 28.6% of all households were made up of individuals, and 2.7% had someone living alone who was 65 years of age or older. The average household size was 2.27 and the average family size was 2.86.

In the CDP, the population was spread out, with 20.9% under the age of 18, 4.3% from 18 to 24, 39.1% from 25 to 44, 28.3% from 45 to 64, and 7.4% who were 65 years of age or older. The median age was 37 years. For every 100 females, there were 117.1 males. For every 100 females age 18 and over, there were 120.0 males.

The median income for a household in the CDP was $69,327, and the median income for a family was $93,354. Males had a median income of $30,455 versus $61,635 for females. The per capita income for the CDP was $65,489. None of the families and 6.4% of the population were living below the poverty line, including none under eighteen and none over 64.

According to IRS data, Wilson, Wyoming is ranked No.1 in the U.S. in adjusted average gross income ($296,778).

== Education ==
Public education in the community is provided by Teton County School District #1. Local schools include Wilson Elementary School (grades K-5), Jackson Hole Middle School (grades 6-8), and Jackson Hole High School (grades 9-12).

== Notable people ==
- Alan Hirschfield – film studio executive, CEO of Columbia Pictures (1973–1978), chairman of 20th Century Fox (1982–1986)
- Tommy Moe – Olympic gold medal downhill skier
- Jimmy Chin – American climber, mountaineer, skier, director, and photographer
- Hansjörg Wyss – Swiss billionaire
- Vince Lee – American architect, climber, mountaineer, Andean explorer, environmentalist
- Dick Cheney – 46th vice president of the United States
- Amy Wyss – Swiss billionaire
- Liz Cheney – American attorney and politician

== Other ==
The commercial area is centered mainly around the Fish Creek plaza. Community events take place in the Owen Bircher park, which includes an ice rink and horse corrals.

== See also ==
- List of census-designated places in Wyoming
