= Hoback, Wyoming =

- CDP
- Location of Hoback, Wyoming
- Coordinates: 43°18′57″N 110°46′20″W
- Country: United States
- State: Wyoming
- County: Teton

Area
  - Total: 44.35 sq mi (114.9 km^{2})
  - Land: 43.45 sq mi (112.5 km^{2})
  - Water: 0.9 sq mi (2.3 km^{2})
- Elevation: 5,879 ft (1,792 m)

Population (2010)
  - Total: 1,176
  - Density: 27.07/sq mi (10.45/km^{2})
- Time zone: UTC-7 (Mountain (MST))
  - Summer (DST): UTC-6 (MDT)
- Area code: 307
- FIPS code: 56-37945
- GNIS feature ID: 2408392

Hoback is a census-designated place (CDP) in southern Teton County, Wyoming, United States. The population was 1,176 at the 2010 census. It is part of the Jackson, WY–ID Micropolitan Statistical Area. The town is named for John Hoback, a mountain man who guided the Astor party through the area in 1811.

== Geography ==
According to the United States Census Bureau, the CDP has a total area of 44.35 square miles (114.9 km^{2}), of which 43.46 square miles (112.5 km^{2}) is land and 0.9 square mile (2.32 km^{2}) (2.0%) is water.

== Demographics ==
As of the census of 2000, there were 1,453 people, 577 households, and 386 families residing in the CDP. The population density was 8.2 inhabitants per square mile (3.2/km^{2}). There were 678 housing units at an average density of 3.8 per square mile (1.5/km^{2}). The racial makeup of the CDP was 96.77% White, 0.62% Native American, 0.41% Asian, 0.83% from other races, and 1.38% from two or more races. Hispanic or Latino of any race were 2.62% of the population.

There were 577 households, out of which 32.2% had children under the age of 18 living with them, 60.0% were married couples living together, 4.3% had a female householder with no husband present, and 33.1% were non-families. 19.6% of all households were made up of individuals, and 2.9% had someone living alone who was 65 years of age or older. The average household size was 2.52 and the average family size was 2.95.

In the CDP, the population was spread out, with 22.9% under the age of 18, 6.3% from 18 to 24, 35.6% from 25 to 44, 29.4% from 45 to 64, and 5.8% who were 65 years of age or older. The median age was 39 years. For every 100 females, there were 117.5 males. For every 100 females age 18 and over, there were 117.9 males.

The median income for a household in the CDP was $64,679, and the median income for a family was $80,387. Males had a median income of $36,613 versus $35,023 for females. The per capita income for the CDP was $32,753. None of the families and 3.3% of the population were living below the poverty line, including no under eighteens and 8.6% of those over 64.

== Education and Public Services ==
Public education in the community of Hoback is provided by Teton County School District #1.

In 2023 Hoback area residents created the Hoback Junction Water and Sewer District. This was in response to dangerously high levels of nitrate in the wells in the area. In 2024 the District raised funds sufficient to build a community water system -- including the placing of hydrants for fire suppression. The system is anticipated to come on line in 2027.

== See also ==
- List of census-designated places in Wyoming
