= Teton Village, Wyoming =

- CDP
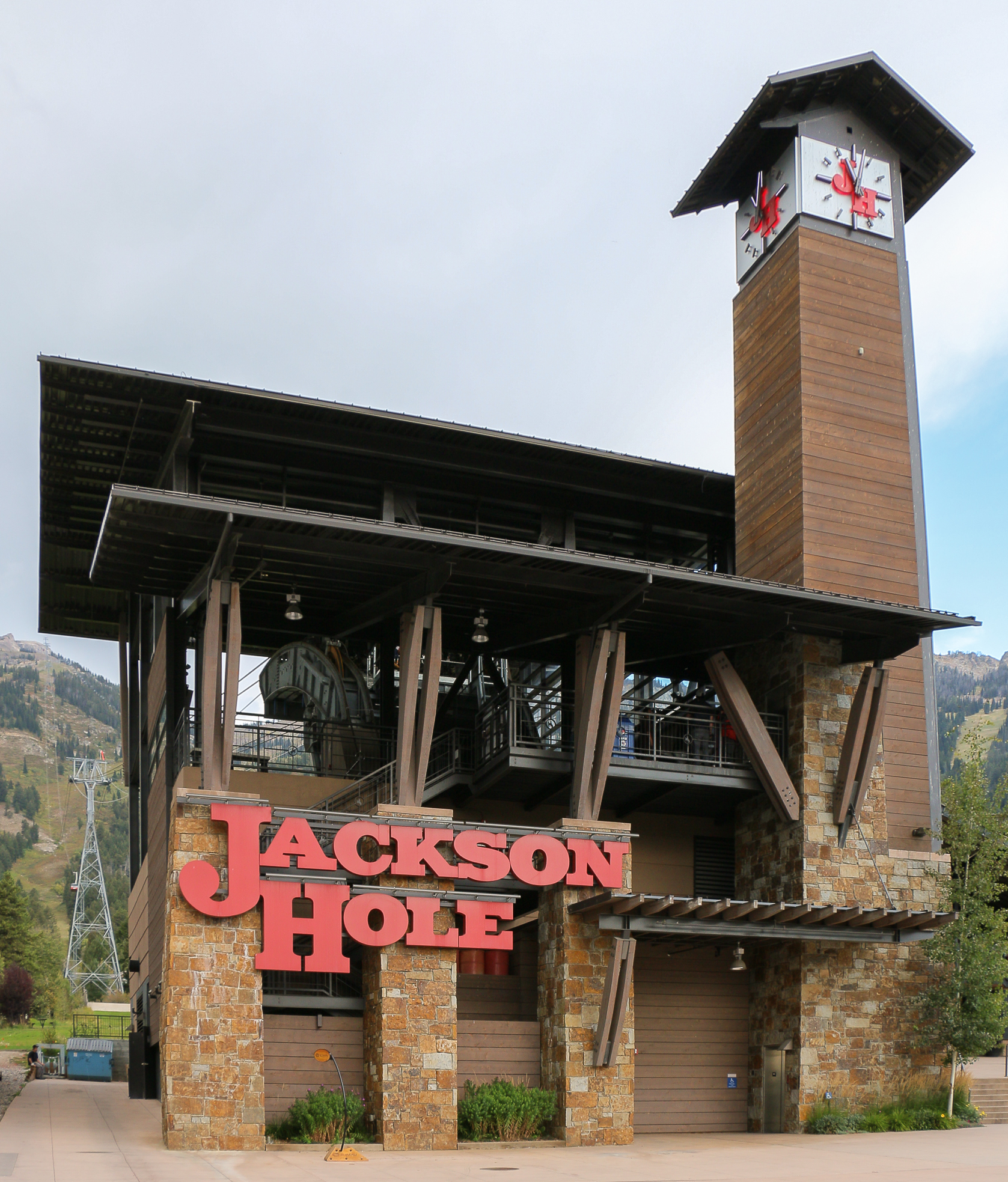
- Clock tower and tram station in Teton Village

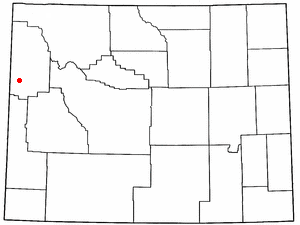
- Location of Teton Village, Wyoming
- Coordinates: 43°35′11″N 110°49′36″W
- Country: United States
- State: Wyoming
- County: Teton

Area
  - Total: 5.8 sq mi (14.9 km^{2})
  - Land: 5.8 sq mi (14.9 km^{2})
  - Water: 0 sq mi (0.0 km^{2})
- Elevation: 6,329 ft (1,929 m)

Population (2020)
  - Total: 517
  - Density: 89.9/sq mi (34.7/km^{2})
- Time zone: UTC-7 (Mountain (MST))
  - Summer (DST): UTC-6 (MDT)
- ZIP code: 83025
- Area code: 307
- FIPS code: 56-75935
- GNIS feature ID: 1603585

Teton Village is a census-designated place (CDP) in Teton County, Wyoming, United States. The population was 517 at the 2020 census. The village surrounds the base of the Jackson Hole Mountain Resort. It is accessed from nearby Jackson and the surrounding area via the Moose-Wilson Road (WYO 390).

Teton Village is part of the Jackson micropolitan area.

== Geography ==
Teton Village is located at 43°35′11″N 110°49′36″W (43.586405, -110.826729).

According to the United States Census Bureau, the CDP has a total area of 5.7 square miles (14.9 km^{2}), all land.

== Demographics ==
At the 2000 census there were 175 people, 88 households, and 44 families in the CDP. The population density was 34.9 inhabitants per square mile (13.5/km^{2}). There were 396 housing units at an average density of 79.1 per square mile (30.5/km^{2}). The racial makeup of the CDP was 98.86% White and 1.14% Asian. Hispanic or Latino of any race were 1.71%.

Of the 88 households 15.9% had children under the age of 18 living with them, 45.5% were married couples living together, 4.5% had a female householder with no husband present, and 50.0% were non-families. 36.4% of households were one person and 8.0% were one person aged 65 or older. The average household size was 1.99 and the average family size was 2.68.

The age distribution was 13.1% under the age of 18, 7.4% from 18 to 24, 27.4% from 25 to 44, 32.0% from 45 to 64, and 20.0% 65 or older. The median age was 47 years. For every 100 females, there were 116.0 males. For every 100 females age 18 and over, there were 108.2 males.

The median household income was $80,000 and the median family income was $151,480. Males had a median income of $100,000 versus $22,917 for females. The per capita income for the CDP was $66,928. None of the families and 5.9% of the population were living below the poverty line.

== Education ==
Public education in the community of Teton Village is provided by Teton County School District #1.

== Notable person ==
- Lincoln Chafee, former governor and Senator of Rhode Island
