= Teton County, Wyoming =

County in Wyoming, United States

- County
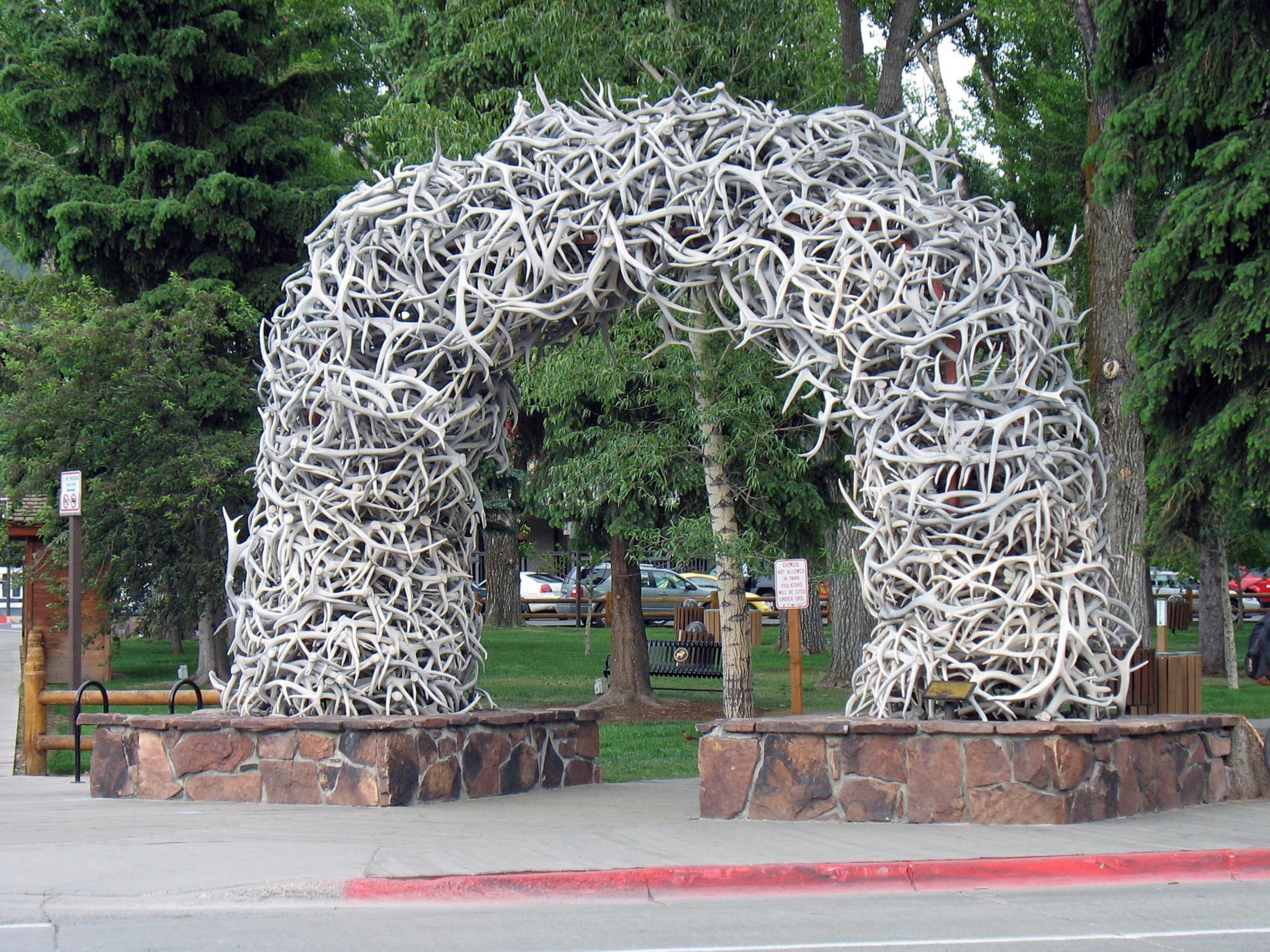
- George Washington Memorial Park (Jackson, Wyoming)

- Flag

- Location within the U.S. state of Wyoming
- Coordinates: 43°55′N 110°34′W
- Country: United States
- State: Wyoming
- Founded: February 15, 1921 (authorized); 1922 (organized)
- Named for: Teton Range
- Seat: Jackson
- Largest town: Jackson

Area
  - Total: 4,216 sq mi (10,920 km^{2})
  - Land: 3,995 sq mi (10,350 km^{2})
  - Water: 221 sq mi (570 km^{2}) 5.2%

Population (2020)
  - Total: 23,331
  - Estimate (2025): 23,333 ▲
  - Density: 5.840/sq mi (2.255/km^{2})
- Time zone: UTC−7 (Mountain)
  - Summer (DST): UTC−6 (MDT)
- Congressional district: At-large

Teton County is a county in the U.S. state of Wyoming. As of the 2020 United States census, the population was 23,331. Its county seat is Jackson. Its west boundary line is also the Wyoming state boundary shared with Idaho and the southern tip of Montana. Teton County is part of the Jackson, WY-ID Micropolitan Statistical Area. Teton County contains the Jackson Hole ski area, all of Grand Teton National Park, and 40.4% of Yellowstone National Park's total area, including over 96.6% of its water area (largely in Yellowstone Lake).

== History ==
Teton County was created on February 15, 1921, from a portion of Lincoln County. Its governing organization was completed in 1922. The county was named for the Teton Range. The county was created because the inhabitants lived too far away from Kemmerer, the county seat of Lincoln County. The creation of the county required a special act of the Wyoming Legislature, because the area was too poor and had too few people to qualify for county status under the normal requirements.

== Geography ==
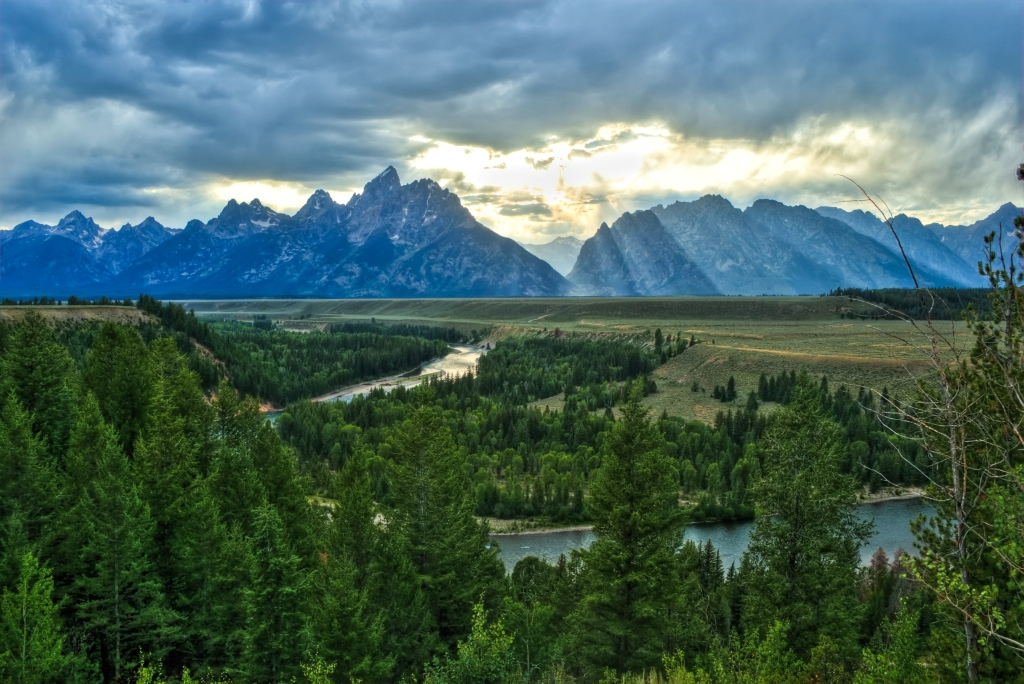
Snake River Overlook and the Teton Range, Teton County

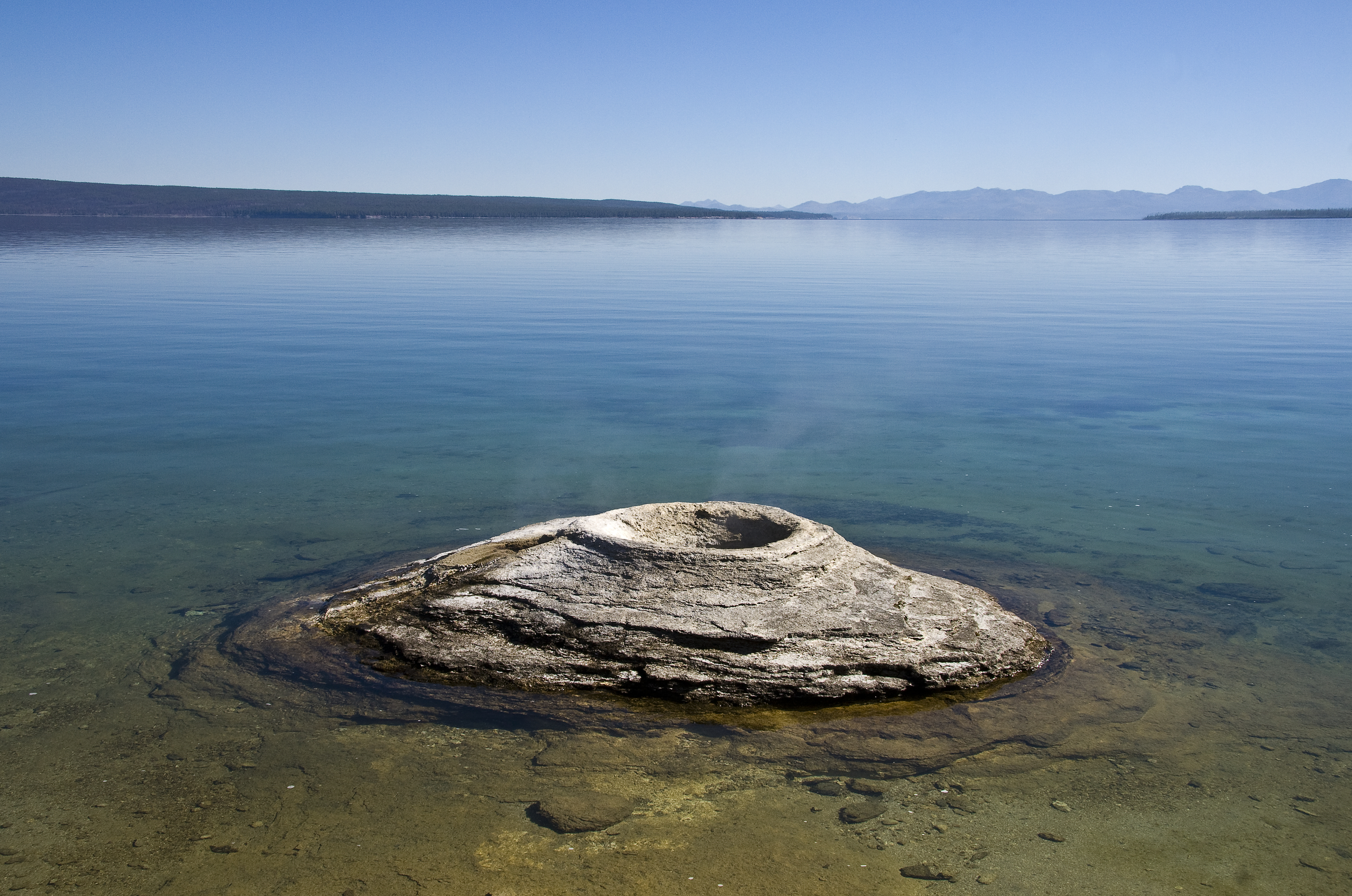
Fishing Cone Geyser and Yellowstone Lake

According to the US Census Bureau, the county has a total area of 4,216 square miles (10,920 km^{2}), of which 3,995 square miles (10,350 km^{2}) is land and 221 square miles (570 km^{2}) (5.2%) is water.

=== Adjacent counties ===
- Park County – northeast
- Fremont County – east
- Sublette County – southeast
- Lincoln County – south
- Bonneville County, Idaho – southwest
- Teton County, Idaho – southwest
- Fremont County, Idaho – west
- Gallatin County, Montana – northwest

=== National protected areas ===
- Bridger-Teton National Forest (part)
- Caribou-Targhee National Forest (part)
- Grand Teton National Park
- John D. Rockefeller Memorial Parkway
- National Elk Refuge
- Shoshone National Forest (part)
- Yellowstone National Park (part)

== Demographics ==
Historical population
| Census | Pop. | Note | %± |
|---|---|---|---|
| 1930 | 2,003 | | — |
| 1940 | 2,543 | | 27.0% |
| 1950 | 2,593 | | 2.0% |
| 1960 | 3,062 | | 18.1% |
| 1970 | 4,823 | | 57.5% |
| 1980 | 9,355 | | 94.0% |
| 1990 | 11,172 | | 19.4% |
| 2000 | 18,251 | | 63.4% |
| 2010 | 21,294 | | 16.7% |
| 2020 | 23,331 | | 9.6% |
| 2025 (est.) | 23,333 | | 0.0% |
US Decennial Census; 1870–2000 2010–2016

=== 2020 census ===
As of the 2020 census, the county had a population of 23,331. Of the residents, 19.6% were under the age of 18 and 16.0% were 65 years of age or older; the median age was 40.0 years. For every 100 females there were 104.8 males, and for every 100 females age 18 and over there were 104.4 males.

Teton County, Wyoming – Racial and ethnic composition Note: the US Census treats Hispanic/Latino as an ethnic category. This table excludes Latinos from the racial categories and assigns them to a separate category. Hispanics/Latinos may be of any race.
| Race / Ethnicity (NH = Non-Hispanic) | Pop 2000 | Pop 2010 | Pop 2020 | % 2000 | % 2010 | % 2020 |
|---|---|---|---|---|---|---|
| White alone (NH) | 16,668 | 17,505 | 18,754 | 91.33% | 82.21% | 80.38% |
| Black or African American alone (NH) | 25 | 32 | 49 | 0.14% | 0.15% | 0.21% |
| Native American or Alaska Native alone (NH) | 86 | 76 | 66 | 0.47% | 0.36% | 0.28% |
| Asian alone (NH) | 97 | 228 | 309 | 0.53% | 1.07% | 1.32% |
| Pacific Islander alone (NH) | 6 | 13 | 3 | 0.03% | 0.06% | 0.01% |
| Other race alone (NH) | 12 | 39 | 99 | 0.07% | 0.18% | 0.42% |
| Mixed race or Multiracial (NH) | 172 | 210 | 756 | 0.94% | 0.99% | 3.24% |
| Hispanic or Latino (any race) | 1,185 | 3,191 | 3,295 | 6.49% | 14.99% | 14.12% |
| Total | 18,251 | 21,294 | 23,331 | 100.00% | 100.00% | 100.00% |

The racial makeup of the county was 82.3% White, 0.2% Black or African American, 0.8% American Indian and Alaska Native, 1.4% Asian, 6.1% from some other race, and 9.2% from two or more races. Hispanic or Latino residents of any race comprised 14.1% of the population.

There were 9,609 households in the county, of which 27.3% had children under the age of 18 living with them and 21.2% had a female householder with no spouse or partner present. About 27.2% of all households were made up of individuals and 9.0% had someone living alone who was 65 years of age or older.

There were 13,233 housing units, of which 27.4% were vacant. Among occupied housing units, 58.7% were owner-occupied and 41.3% were renter-occupied. The homeowner vacancy rate was 1.3% and the rental vacancy rate was 5.6%.

=== 2010 census ===
As of the 2010 United States census, there were 21,294 people, 8,973 households, and 4,938 families in the county. The population density was 5.3 people per square mile (2.0 people/km^{2}). There were 12,813 housing units at an average density of 3.2 units per square mile (1.2 units/km^{2}). The racial makeup of the county was 88.4% white, 1.1% Asian, 0.5% American Indian, 0.2% black or African American, 0.1% Pacific islander, 8.1% from other races, and 1.6% from two or more races. Those of Hispanic or Latino origin made up 15.0% of the population. In terms of ancestry, 22.2% were German, 14.9% were English, 13.0% were Irish, and 11.1% were American.

Of the 8,973 households, 25.5% had children under the age of 18 living with them, 45.7% were married couples living together, 5.6% had a female householder with no husband present, 45.0% were non-families, and 29.2% of all households were made up of individuals. The average household size was 2.34 and the average family size was 2.89. The median age was 36.9 years.

The median income for a household in the county was $70,271 and the median income for a family was $90,596. Males had a median income of $40,594 versus $36,715 for females. The per capita income for the county was $42,224. About 5.1% of families and 8.2% of the population were below the poverty line, including 15.5% of those under age 18 and 0.8% of those age 65 or over.

=== 2000 census ===
As of the 2000 United States census there were 18,251 people, 7,688 households, and 4,174 families in the county. The population density was 5 people per square mile (1.9 people/km^{2}). There were 10,267 housing units at an average density of 3 units per square mile (1.2 units/km^{2}). The racial makeup of the county was 93.59% White, 0.15% Black or African American, 0.53% Native American, 0.54% Asian, 0.03% Pacific Islander, 3.93% from other races, and 1.22% from two or more races. 6.49% of the population were Hispanic or Latino of any race. 19.2% were of German, 14.2% English, 11.7% Irish and 6.7% American ancestry.

There were 7,688 households, out of which 25.60% had children under the age of 18 living with them, 45.30% were married couples living together, 5.70% had a female householder with no husband present, and 45.70% were non-families. 27.30% of all households were made up of individuals, and 3.70% had someone living alone who was 65 years of age or older. The average household size was 2.36 and the average family size was 2.89.

The county population contained 19.90% under the age of 18, 9.80% from 18 to 24, 38.30% from 25 to 44, 25.00% from 45 to 64, and 6.90% who were 65 years of age or older. The median age was 35 years. For every 100 females, there were 114.30 males. For every 100 females age 18 and over, there were 115.50 males.

The median income for a household in the county was $54,614, and the median income for a family was $63,916. Males had a median income of $34,570 versus $29,132 for females. The per capita income for the county was $38,260. About 2.80% of families and 6.00% of the population were below the poverty line, including 5.70% of those under age 18 and 4.40% of those age 65 or over.

== Economy ==
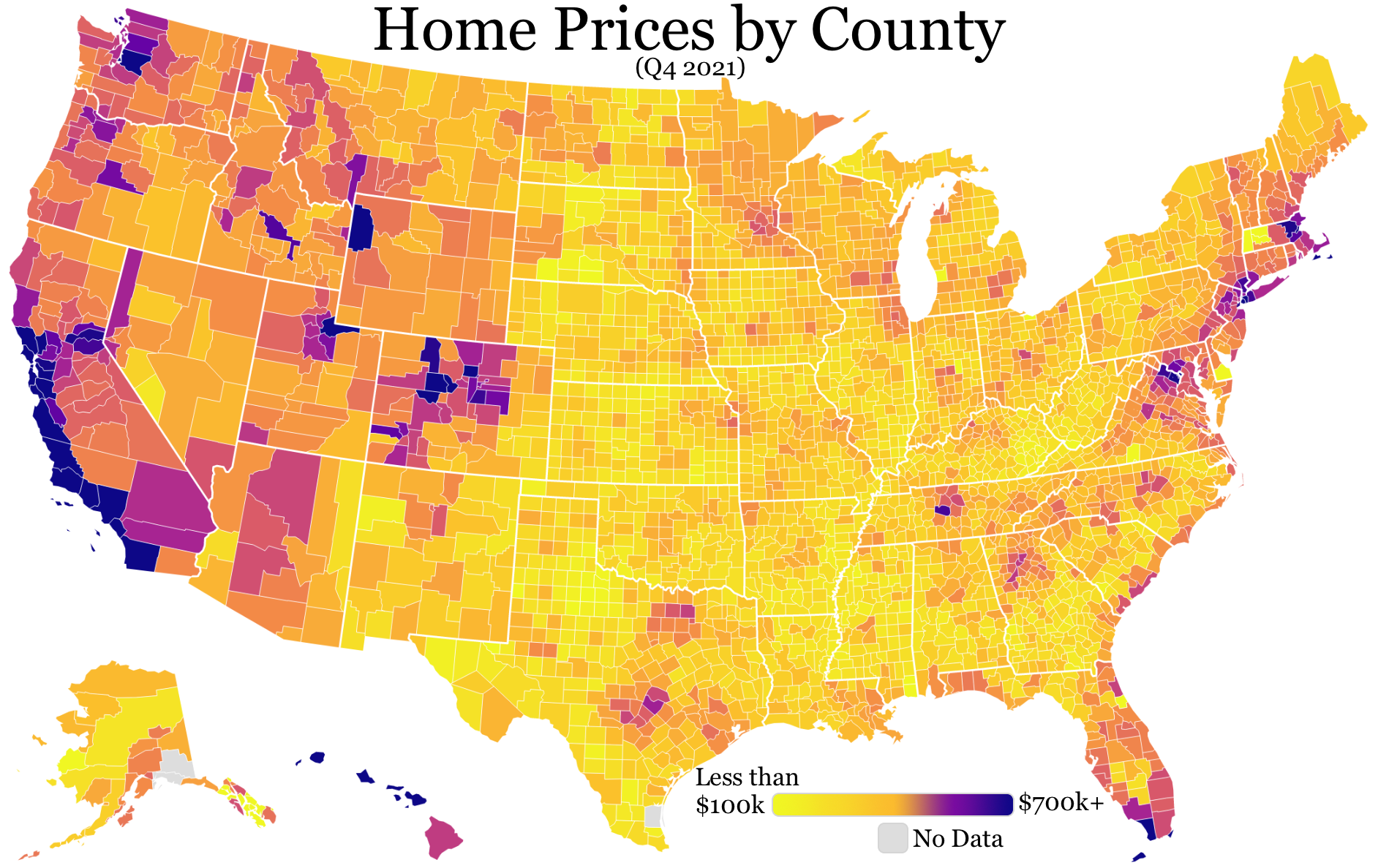
Home prices by county (2021) <$100,000 $200,000 $300,000 $400,000 $500,000 $600,000 $700,000+

Teton County is one of the highest-income counties in the United States. A 2019 Bloomberg L.P. report (citing Bureau of Economic Analysis figures) found that Teton had the highest average incomes per capita of any county in the United States, at $252,000. This was partly attributed to the high incomes of Jackson Hole residents, where property owners include Bill Gates.

As of the fourth quarter of 2021, the median home price in Teton County was $1,060,093, an increase of 17.8% from the prior year.

== Communities ==
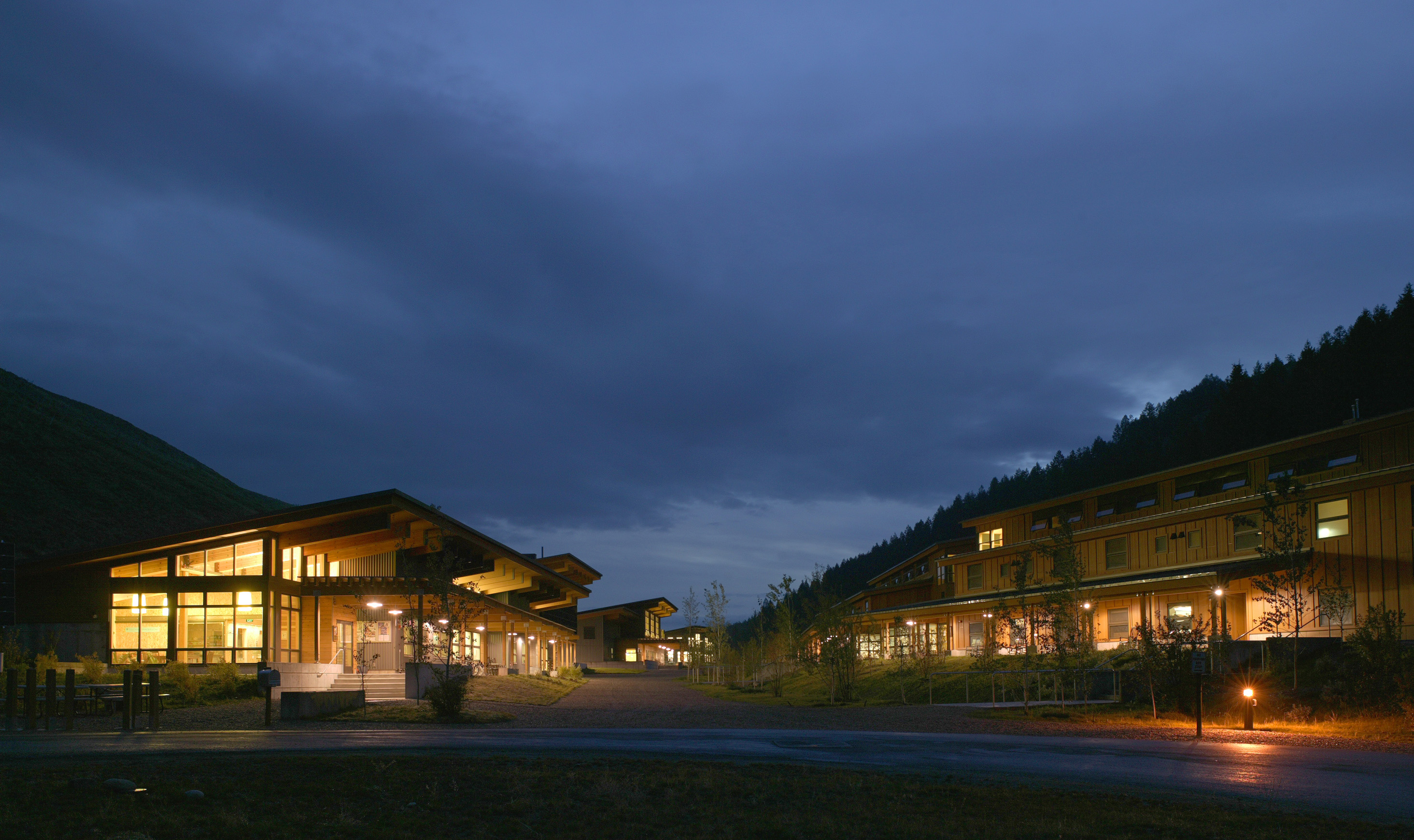
The Jackson Hole Mountain Academy, Jackson campus

=== Town ===
- Jackson (county seat)

=== Census-designated places ===
- Alta
- Hoback
- Kelly
- Moose Wilson Road
- Rafter J Ranch
- South Park
- Teton Village
- Wilson

=== Unincorporated communities ===
- Moran
- Moose

== Politics ==
Liz Skalka of the Huffpost described Teton as a "liberal county" in August 2022. Previously a staunchly Republican county, which produced Governor and U.S. Senator Clifford Hansen, a mass immigration of wealthy liberals from the West Coast has made Teton County the most Democratic county in Wyoming, which has either been the most, or second most republican state on the presidential level this century. The only Republican presidential candidate to win Teton County since 1992 was George W. Bush in 2000, who had county resident Dick Cheney on the ticket. In 2004, Teton was the only Wyoming county won by John Kerry over George W. Bush. In 2008, Barack Obama carried Teton County by a 23.6 percentage point margin over John McCain, even as McCain won statewide by a 32.2-point margin over Obama, his widest margin in any state. Albany County, which includes the University of Wyoming at Laramie, was the only other county in the state to back Obama. In the 2016 election, Hillary Clinton beat Donald Trump by 57.9%–31.1%.

In 2020, Joe Biden beat Donald Trump by 37.5%, the largest margin for a Democrat ever in the county. In 2024, it was the only county to vote for Democrat Kamala Harris, despite Trump winning 71.6% of the vote in Wyoming, the highest vote share ever won in the state.

Despite being reliably Democratic at the presidential level, the county has continued to vote for Republican candidates for the governorship, only voting for Democrats once in 2018 since Dave Freudenthal's 2006 landslide. Most recently, Teton voted for Republicans Mark Gordon and Eric Barlow for governor in 2022 and 2026, respectively, due to historic underperformances by their Democratic challengers. At the Senate level, the county is more reliably Democratic, having last voted Republican in 2014 when a red wave powered Mike Enzi's reelection to a fourth term in office.

United States presidential election results for Teton County, Wyoming
| Year | Republican | | Democratic | | Third party(ies) | |
| Year | No. | % | No. | % | No. | % |
|---|---|---|---|---|---|---|
| 1924 | 342 | 54.63% | 173 | 27.64% | 111 | 17.73% |
| 1928 | 495 | 64.29% | 270 | 35.06% | 5 | 0.65% |
| 1932 | 406 | 36.41% | 699 | 62.69% | 10 | 0.90% |
| 1936 | 501 | 37.06% | 795 | 58.80% | 56 | 4.14% |
| 1940 | 623 | 46.05% | 728 | 53.81% | 2 | 0.15% |
| 1944 | 637 | 56.07% | 499 | 43.93% | 0 | 0.00% |
| 1948 | 719 | 55.78% | 556 | 43.13% | 14 | 1.09% |
| 1952 | 1,166 | 78.62% | 317 | 21.38% | 0 | 0.00% |
| 1956 | 1,089 | 77.73% | 312 | 22.27% | 0 | 0.00% |
| 1960 | 1,158 | 66.51% | 583 | 33.49% | 0 | 0.00% |
| 1964 | 1,081 | 52.76% | 968 | 47.24% | 0 | 0.00% |
| 1968 | 1,419 | 69.25% | 461 | 22.50% | 169 | 8.25% |
| 1972 | 2,182 | 70.03% | 810 | 25.99% | 124 | 3.98% |
| 1976 | 2,667 | 67.40% | 1,204 | 30.43% | 86 | 2.17% |
| 1980 | 3,004 | 57.64% | 1,361 | 26.11% | 847 | 16.25% |
| 1984 | 3,487 | 67.85% | 1,565 | 30.45% | 87 | 1.69% |
| 1988 | 3,616 | 61.02% | 2,217 | 37.41% | 93 | 1.57% |
| 1992 | 2,854 | 34.05% | 3,120 | 37.22% | 2,408 | 28.73% |
| 1996 | 3,918 | 43.54% | 4,042 | 44.92% | 1,038 | 11.54% |
| 2000 | 5,454 | 52.29% | 4,019 | 38.53% | 958 | 9.18% |
| 2004 | 5,124 | 45.11% | 5,972 | 52.58% | 263 | 2.32% |
| 2008 | 4,565 | 37.07% | 7,472 | 60.67% | 279 | 2.27% |
| 2012 | 4,858 | 42.38% | 6,213 | 54.20% | 393 | 3.43% |
| 2016 | 3,921 | 31.05% | 7,314 | 57.92% | 1,392 | 11.02% |
| 2020 | 4,341 | 29.58% | 9,848 | 67.10% | 488 | 3.32% |
| 2024 | 4,134 | 31.12% | 8,748 | 65.84% | 404 | 3.04% |

== Education ==
Teton County School District Number 1 is the school district for the entire county.

In prior eras, a portion of the county was not in any school district.

Central Wyoming College has an outreach center in Jackson that offers select post-secondary courses.

== See also ==
- National Register of Historic Places listings in Teton County, Wyoming
- Wyoming
  - List of cities and towns in Wyoming
  - List of counties in Wyoming
  - Wyoming statistical areas
