= Teton Dam =

Dam in Idaho, US that collapsed in 1976

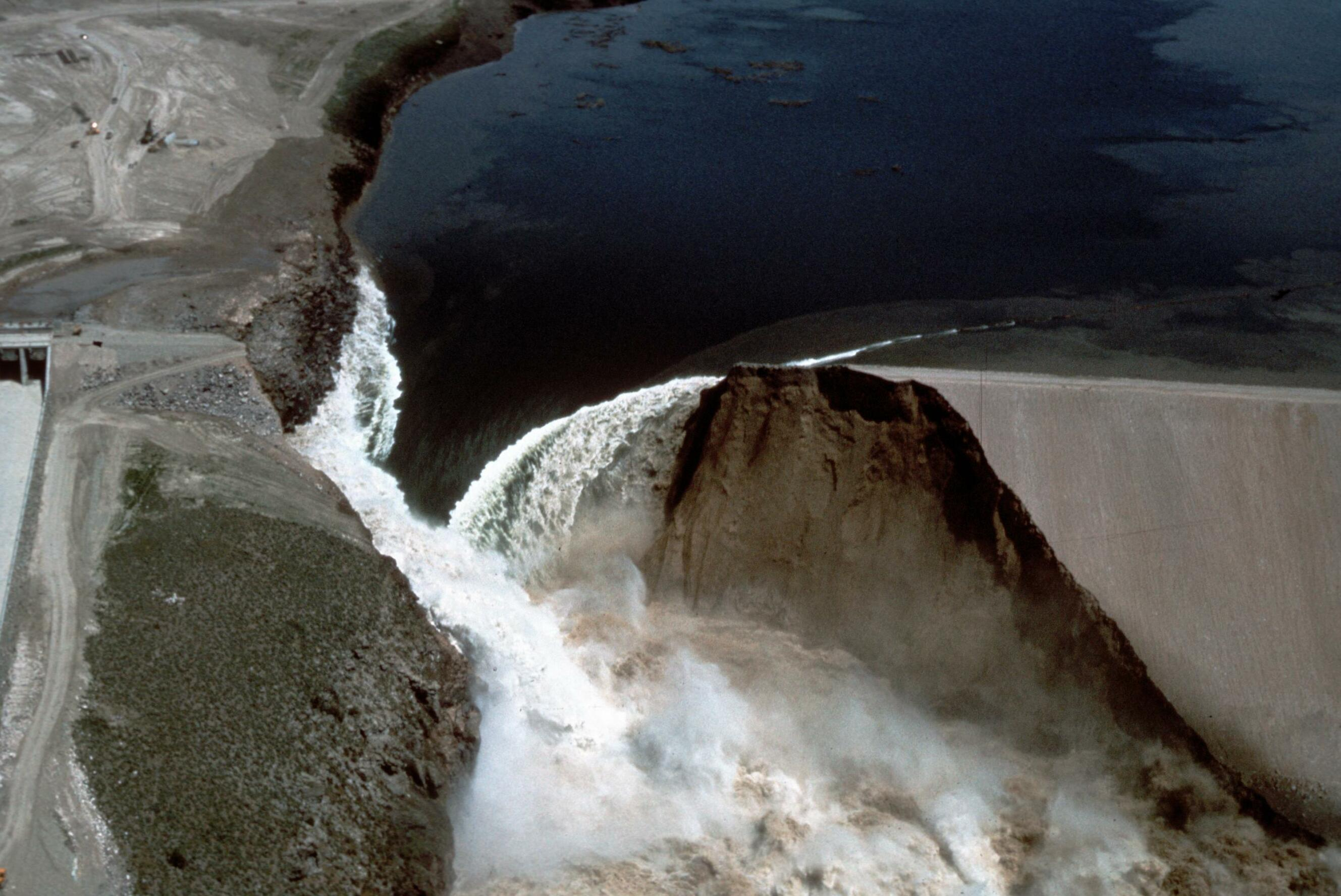
- Dam failure on June 5, 1976

- Location in the United States Location in Idaho
- Official name: Teton Dam
- Country: United States
- Location: Fremont & Madison counties, Idaho
- Coordinates: 43°54′35″N 111°32′21″W
- Purpose: Flood control, irrigation
- Construction began: 1972
- Opening date: 1976; 50 years ago
- Demolition date: June 5, 1976 (failure)
- Construction cost: $48,825,000 ($276 million in 2025)
- Owner: U.S. Bureau of Reclamation

Dam and spillways
- Type of dam: Embankment dam
- Impounds: Teton River
- Height: 305 ft (93 m)
- Length: 3,100 ft (940 m)
- Width (base): 1,700 ft (520 m)

Reservoir
- Creates: Teton Reservoir
- Total capacity: 288,250 acre-feet (355,550,000 m^{3})
- Normal elevation: 5,320 ft (1,620 m) AMSL

The Teton Dam was an earthen dam in the western United States, on the Teton River in eastern Idaho. It was built by the U.S. Bureau of Reclamation, one of eight federal agencies authorized to construct dams. Located between Fremont and Madison counties, it suffered a catastrophic failure on June 5, 1976, as it was filling for the first time.

The collapse of Teton Dam killed 11 people and 16,000 livestock. The dam cost about $100 million to build and the federal government paid over $300 million in claims arising from its failure. Total damage estimates reached $2 billion. The dam has not been rebuilt.

== History and geology ==
Interest in building a dam in the eastern Snake River Plain had arisen for many years to control spring runoff and provide a more constant water supply in the summer. The area had suffered a severe drought in 1961, followed by severe flooding in 1962. The Bureau of Reclamation proposed the Teton Dam in 1963 and Congress passed, without opposition, an authorizing bill the following year. The planned dam was to be an earthen structure 310 feet (94 m) high and 0.6 miles (1.0 km) long, creating a reservoir 17 miles (27 km) in length. The impounded water would be used to generate hydroelectric power. An environmental impact statement was issued for the dam in 1971, but it did not raise the possibility of a collapse. Lack of funding and site preparation work and questions surrounding the required environmental impact statement stalled the project. Barely 14 pages long, the statement quickly drew the ire of opponents of the project.

On September 27, 1971, several environmental and conservation groups filed a lawsuit in Idaho District Court to stop the construction. Opponents of the dam questioned the project's justifications. They argued that damming a wild and scenic river would result in the destruction of its trout fishery and other wildlife habitat and "replace a unique resource with a vulgar one." The suit questioned the economic return on the investment, the bureau's compliance with the National Environmental Policy Act, and the geologic soundness of the dam's location. Concerns over the seismic conditions of the dam site delayed the bid process pending further review by the Department of the Interior. Pressure from Idaho's congressional delegation stopped the review, and in spite of the lawsuit, bids were taken in Idaho Falls on October 29, 1971. The $39 million contract was awarded in December 1971 to Morrison-Knudsen Co. of Boise, assisted by Peter Kiewit Sons Co. of Omaha, Nebraska. In spite of the lawsuit, work began in February 1972. After various motions, amended complaints, attempted injunctions, and appeals, the suit was dismissed on December 23, 1974.

The eastern Snake River Plain is underlain almost entirely by basalt erupted from large shield volcanos on top of rhyolitic ash-flow tuff and ignimbrites. The Huckleberry Ridge Tuff, a late-Cenozoic volcanic rock, is 1.9 million years old. The dam site is composed of basalt and rhyolite, both of which are considered unsuitable for dam construction because of their high permeability. This was confirmed by long-term pump-in tests at rates of 165 to 460 US gal (620 to 1,740 L) per minute. Test cores, drilled by engineers and geologists employed by the Bureau of Reclamation, showed that the canyon rock at the dam site is highly fissured and unstable, particularly on the right side (as one faces the direction of flow). The widest fissures were determined to be 1.7 inches (4.3 cm) wide. The bureau planned to seal these fissures by injecting grout into the rock under high pressure to create a grout curtain in the rock.

In addition, an investigation of the area by geologists of the U.S. Geologic Survey indicated that it was seismically active; five earthquakes had occurred within 30 miles (50 km) of the dam site in the previous five years, two of which had been of significant magnitude. This information was provided to the Bureau of Reclamation in a memorandum, but the geologists' concerns were considerably watered down in the 6-month redrafting process before the USGS sent the final version of the memo to the USBR in July 1973.

In 1973, when the dam was only half built, but almost $5 million had already been spent on the project, large, open fissures were encountered during excavation of the keyway trench near the right end of the dam, about 700 ft (210 m) from the canyon wall. The two largest, near-vertical fissures trended generally east–west and extended more than 100 ft (30 m) below the bottom of the key trench. Some of the fissures were lined with calcite, and rubble filled others. Several voids, as much as 6 in (15 cm) wide, were encountered 60 to 85 ft (18 to 26 m) below the ground surface beyond the right end of the dam and grout curtain. The largest fissures were actually caves. One of them was 11 feet (3.4 m) wide and 100 feet (30 m) long. Another one was 9 feet (2.7 m) wide in places and 190 ft (60 m) long. These were not grouted because they were beyond the keyway trench and beyond the area where the bureau had decided grouting was required. This necessitated using twice as much grouting as had been originally anticipated; the total injected grout included 496,515 ft^{3} (14,060 m^{3}) of Portland cement, 82,364 ft^{3} (2,332 m^{3}) of sand, 132,000 lb (60 t) of bentonite, and 418,000 lb (190 t) of calcium chloride, injected into 118,179 ft (36.021 km) of drilled holes.

Later, the report of a committee of the House of Representatives, which investigated the dam's collapse, felt that the discovery of the caves should have been sufficient for the Bureau of Reclamation to doubt its ability to fill them in with grout, but this did not happen. Even after the dam had failed, the bureau continued to insist that the grouting was appropriate.

In December 1972, concerned about the geological conditions of the Teton River Canyon, USGS geologist David Schleicher wrote about the Teton Dam while it was still under construction, "A final point is that flooding in response to seismic or other failure of the dam—probably most likely at the time of highest water—would make the flood of February 1962 look like small potatoes. Since such a flood could be anticipated, we might consider a series of strategically placed motion-picture cameras to document the process."

== Filling ==
The dam was completed in November 1975 and filling the reservoir began at the standard rate of one foot (30 cm) a day. However, snows were heavy that winter, and five months later, the project's construction engineer requested permission to double the filling rate to deal with the additional spring run-off, while continuing to inspect for leaks and monitor the groundwater. A month later, though monitoring showed that groundwater was flowing a thousand times faster than had been originally anticipated, the filling rate was doubled again, to 4 feet (1.2 m) a day.

On June 3 and 4, 1976, three small springs were discovered downstream of the dam, although the water running through the leaks was clear and such leaks are not unexpected for an earthen dam. At the time, the reservoir was almost at capacity, with a maximum depth of 240 feet (73 m). The only structure that had been initially prepared for releasing water was the emergency outlet works, which could carry just 850 cubic feet per second (24 m^{3}/s). The main outlet works and spillway gates were not yet in service; the gates were cordoned off by steel walls while they were being painted.

== Collapse and flood ==
Breach of Teton Dam, June 5, 1976

Large amounts of mud are now spilling down the face of the dam, unchecked by the efforts of the bulldozer operators. The outlet works at the foot of the dam are flooding with muddy water.

The dam is now breached and muddy water flows violently over the dam face.

The breach has now widened to nearly its full extent. The outlet works are completely inundated with muddy water.

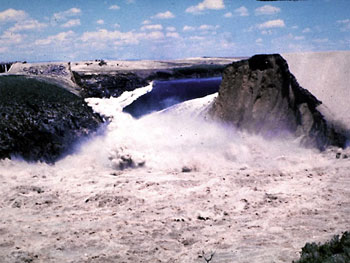
The reservoir emptying through the failed dam

On Saturday, June 5, 1976, at 7:30 am MDT, a muddy leak appeared, suggesting sediment was in the water, but engineers did not believe there was a problem. By 9:30 am, the downstream face of the dam had developed a wet spot, which began to discharge water at 20 to 30 cubic feet per second (570 to 850 L/s), and the embankment material began to wash out. Crews with bulldozers were sent to plug the leak, but were unsuccessful. Local media appeared at the site, and at 11:15 am officials told the county sheriff's office to evacuate downstream residents. Work crews were forced to flee on foot as the widening gap, now larger than a swimming pool, swallowed their equipment. The operators of two bulldozers caught in the eroding embankment were pulled to safety with ropes.

At 11:55 am MDT (UTC−17:55), the crest of the dam sagged and collapsed into the reservoir; two minutes later, the remainder of the right-bank third of the main dam wall disintegrated. Over 2,000,000 cubic feet per second (57,000 m^{3}/s) (many times the average flow rate of Niagara Falls and greater than the average flow of any river in the world except the Amazon) of sediment-filled water emptied through the breach into the remaining 6 miles (10 km) of the Teton River canyon, after which the flood spread out and shallowed on the Snake River Plain. By 8:00 pm, the reservoir had completely emptied, although over two-thirds of the dam wall remained standing.

== Cause ==
Study of the dam's environment and structure placed blame for the collapse on the permeable loess soil used in the core and on fissured (cracked) rhyolite in the abutments of the dam that allowed water to seep around and through the earth-fill dam. The permeable loess was found to be cracked. The combination of these flaws is thought to have allowed water to seep through the dam and to lead to internal erosion, called piping, that eventually caused the dam's collapse.

An investigating panel had quickly identified piping as the most probable cause of the failure, then focused its efforts on determining how the piping started. Two mechanisms were possible. The first was the flow of water under highly erodible and unprotected fill, through joints in unsealed rock beneath the grout cap and development of an erosion tunnel. The second was "cracking caused by differential strains or hydraulic fracturing of the core material." The panel was unable to determine whether one or the other mechanism occurred, or a combination:

The fundamental cause of failure may be regarded as a combination of geological factors and design decisions that, taken together, permitted the failure to develop.

A wide-ranging controversy ensued from the dam's collapse. According to the Bureau of Reclamation, bureau engineers assess all reclamation dams under strict criteria established by the Safety of Dams program. Each structure is periodically reviewed for resistance to seismic activity, for internal faults, and for physical deterioration. The dam safety program identified two other dangerous dams – Fontenelle, which very nearly failed 11 years earlier, when it was filled, in a manner similar to the Teton Dam, and again in May 1985; and the Jackson Lake Dam, which would have failed during an earthquake on the nearby Teton Fault.

== Deaths, damage, and property claims ==
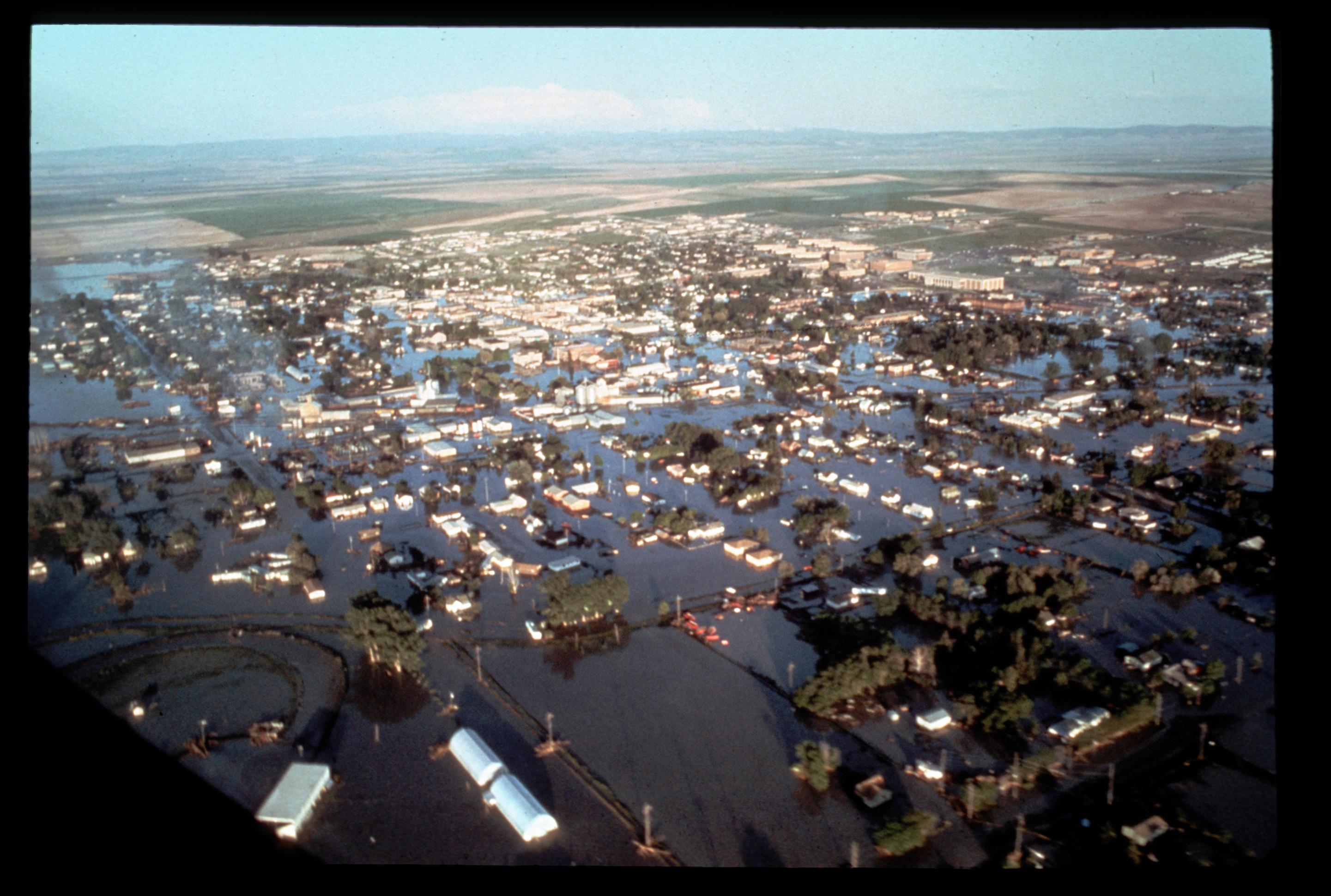
Rexburg flooded

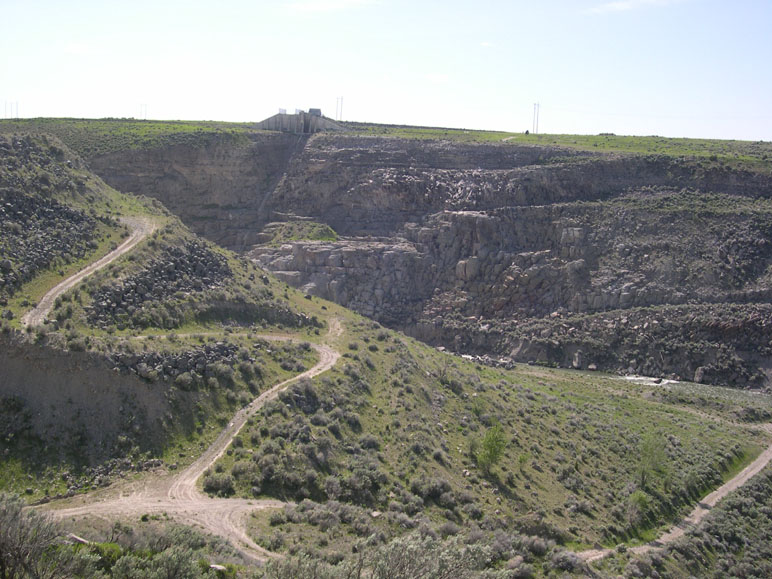
Teton Dam ruins in 2004

Teton Canyon ends about six miles (10 km) below the dam site, where the river flows onto the Snake River Plain. When the dam failed, the flood struck several communities immediately downstream, particularly Wilford at the terminus of the canyon, Sugar City, Salem, Hibbard, and Rexburg. Thousands of homes and businesses were destroyed. The small agricultural communities of Wilford and Sugar City were wiped from the river bank. Five of the 11 deaths attributed to the flood occurred in Wilford. The similar community of Teton, on the south bank of the river, is on a modest bench and was largely spared. One Teton resident was fishing on the river at the time of the dam failure and was drowned. An elderly woman living in the city of Teton died as a result of the evacuation.

An estimated 80% of existing structures were damaged in the Hibbard and Rexburg area, whose population was about 10,000. The Teton River flows through the industrial, commercial, and residential districts of north Rexburg. Much of the damage in the area was done by thousands of logs dislodged from a lumber yard. Dozens of them hit a bulk gasoline-storage tank a few hundred yards away. The gasoline ignited and sent flaming slicks adrift on the racing water. The force of the logs and cut lumber and the subsequent fires practically destroyed the town.

The flood waters traveled west along the route of the Henrys Fork of the Snake River, around both sides of the Menan Buttes, damaging the community of Roberts. The city of Idaho Falls, even further down on the flood plain, had time to prepare. At the older American Falls Dam downstream, engineers increased discharge by less than 5% before the flood arrived. That dam held and the flood was effectively over, but tens of thousands of acres of land near the river were stripped of fertile topsoil.

The force of the failure destroyed the lower part of the Teton River, washing away riparian zones and reducing the canyon walls. This damaged the stream's ecology and hurt the native Yellowstone cutthroat trout population. The force of the water and excessive sediment also damaged stream habitat in the Snake River and some tributaries, as far downstream as the Fort Hall bottoms.

Debris clean-up began immediately and took the remainder of the summer. Rebuilding of damaged property continued for several years. Within a week of the disaster, President Gerald Ford requested a $200 million appropriation for initial payments for damages, without assigning responsibility for Teton Dam's failure.

The Bureau of Reclamation set up claims offices in Rexburg, Idaho Falls, and Blackfoot. By January 4, 1977, seven months after the disaster, victims had filed over 4,800 claims totaling $194 million and the federal government had paid 3,813 of those claims worth $93.5 million. The claims program was originally scheduled to end in July 1978, but continued until January 1987, when the federal government had paid 7,563 claims for a total amount of $322 million.

Reconstruction of the Teton Dam has been discussed over the years, but no plans have been made for its rebuilding.

Footage and interviews are featured in Catastrophe-No Safe Place (1980), hosted by Charles Bronson and Jill Ireland.

== See also ==
- Great Sheffield Flood
- St. Francis Dam, a concrete dam near Los Angeles, which failed in 1928 resulting in over 400 deaths
- Fontenelle Dam, an earthen dam in southwest Wyoming, which partially failed in 1965 but remains in operation
