= Fontenelle =

Fontenelle may refer to:

== Places ==
=== France ===
- Fontenelle, Aisne, in the Aisne department
- Fontenelle-en-Brie, in the Aisne department
- Fontenelle, Côte-d'Or, in the Côte-d'Or department
- Fontenelle, Territoire de Belfort, in the Territoire de Belfort department
- Fontenelle-Montby, in the Doubs department

=== United States ===
- Fontenelle, Wyoming
- Fontenelle Dam, on the Green River in Wyoming
  - Fontenelle Reservoir
- Fontenelle Forest, in Bellevue, Nebraska
- Fontenelle Park, a public park in North Omaha, Nebraska
- Fontenelle's Post, in Nebraska Territory
- Hotel Fontenelle, a demolished hotel in Omaha, Nebraska
- Logan Fontenelle Housing Project, Omaha, Nebraska
- Logan Fontenelle Middle School, Bellevue, Nebraska

=== Other places ===
- Fontenelle (crater), a crater on the Moon

== People ==
- Bernard Le Bovier de Fontenelle (1657–1757), French writer
- Guy Éder de La Fontenelle (1573–1602), house of Beaumanoir, Catholic League partisan, bandit in western Brittany
- Desiderius of Fontenelle (died 700), Frankish saint of the late 7th century
- Logan Fontenelle (1825–1855), chief of the Omaha Tribe
- Louisa Fontenelle (1769–1799), actress and singer who played in London and Scotland, then joined the Boston Theatre
- Lucien Fontenelle (1800–1840), prominent fur trader in the Nebraska area

== See also ==
- Fontanella (disambiguation)
- Fontanelle (disambiguation)
- Fontenelle Abbey (disambiguation)
- La Fontenelle (disambiguation)
