= Middle Butte =

Cryptodome in Idaho, United States

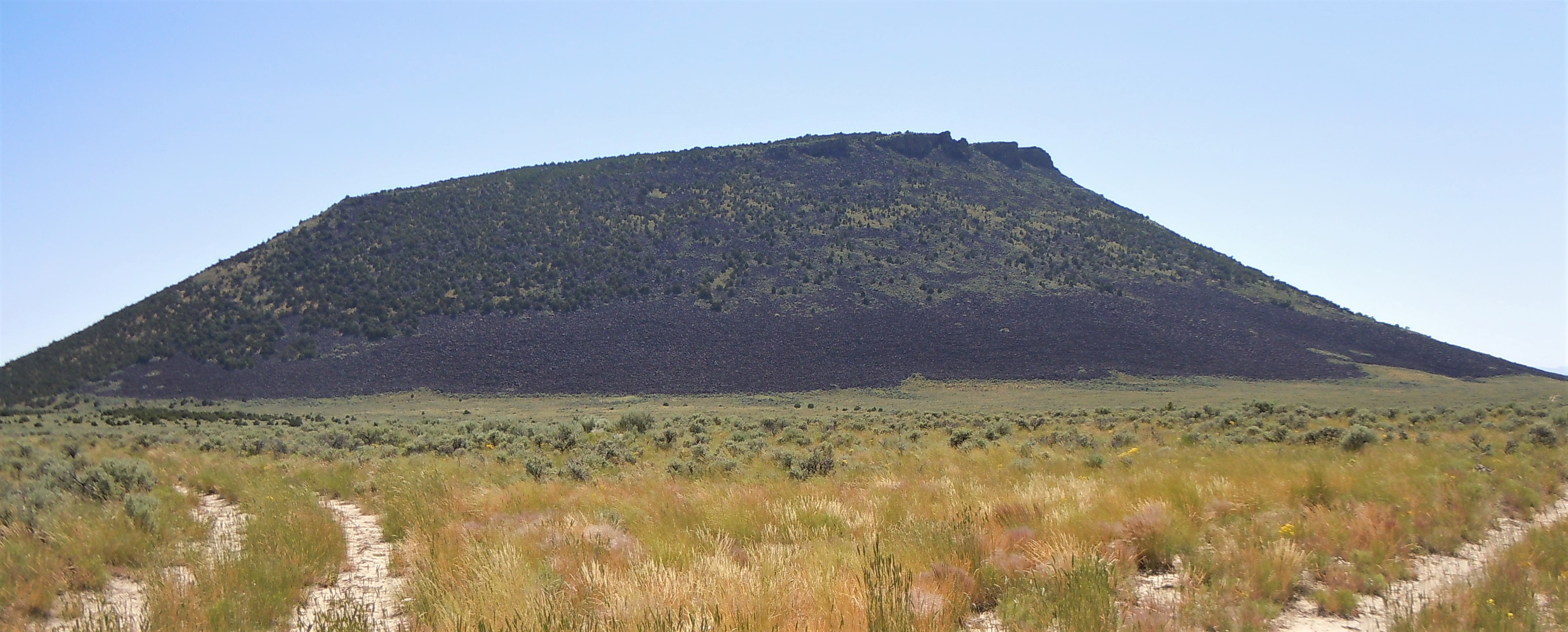
- Northeast aspect

Highest point
- Elevation: 6,391 ft (1,948 m)
- Prominence: 1,061 ft (323 m)
- Parent peak: East Butte (6,572 ft)
- Isolation: 3.73 mi (6.00 km)
- Coordinates: 43°29′26″N 112°44′18″W

Geography
- Location within Idaho Location within the United States
- Country: United States of America
- State: Idaho
- County: Bingham
- Parent range: Snake River Plain; Rocky Mountains
- Topo map: USGS Middle Butte

Geology
- Rock age: Quaternary
- Mountain type: Cryptodome
- Rock type: Basalt

Middle Butte is a 6,391-foot elevation (1,948 m) summit located in Bingham County, Idaho, United States.

== Description ==
Middle Butte is situated 40 miles east of Craters of the Moon National Monument and Preserve, 35 miles west of the community of Idaho Falls, and can be seen from Highway 20 midway between Idaho Falls and Arco at milepost 271. Middle Butte, so named because it is positioned between Big Southern Butte and line parent East Butte, were all landmarks for early explorers and pioneers. Middle Butte is set on land belonging to the Idaho National Laboratory. Topographic relief is modest as the summit rises over 1,000 feet (300 meters) above the Eastern Snake River Plain in one-half mile. This landform's toponym has been officially adopted by the United States Board on Geographic Names. Lewis and Clark recorded seeing Middle Butte during their 1805 expedition, noting its unusual shape in their journals.

== Geology ==
Middle Butte is a cryptodome composed of basalt which formed when an underlying mass of rhyolitic magma pushed up overlying layers of basalt of the Snake River Plain, but the magma never broke the surface. This manner of formation is different than that of East Butte where rhyolitic magma did break through the surface layer of basalt.

== Climate ==
Middle Butte is located in a cold semi-arid climate zone with warm summers and cold winters (Köppen BSk). Winter temperatures can drop below 0 °F with wind chill factors below −20 °F. Precipitation is relatively sparse.

== Gallery ==
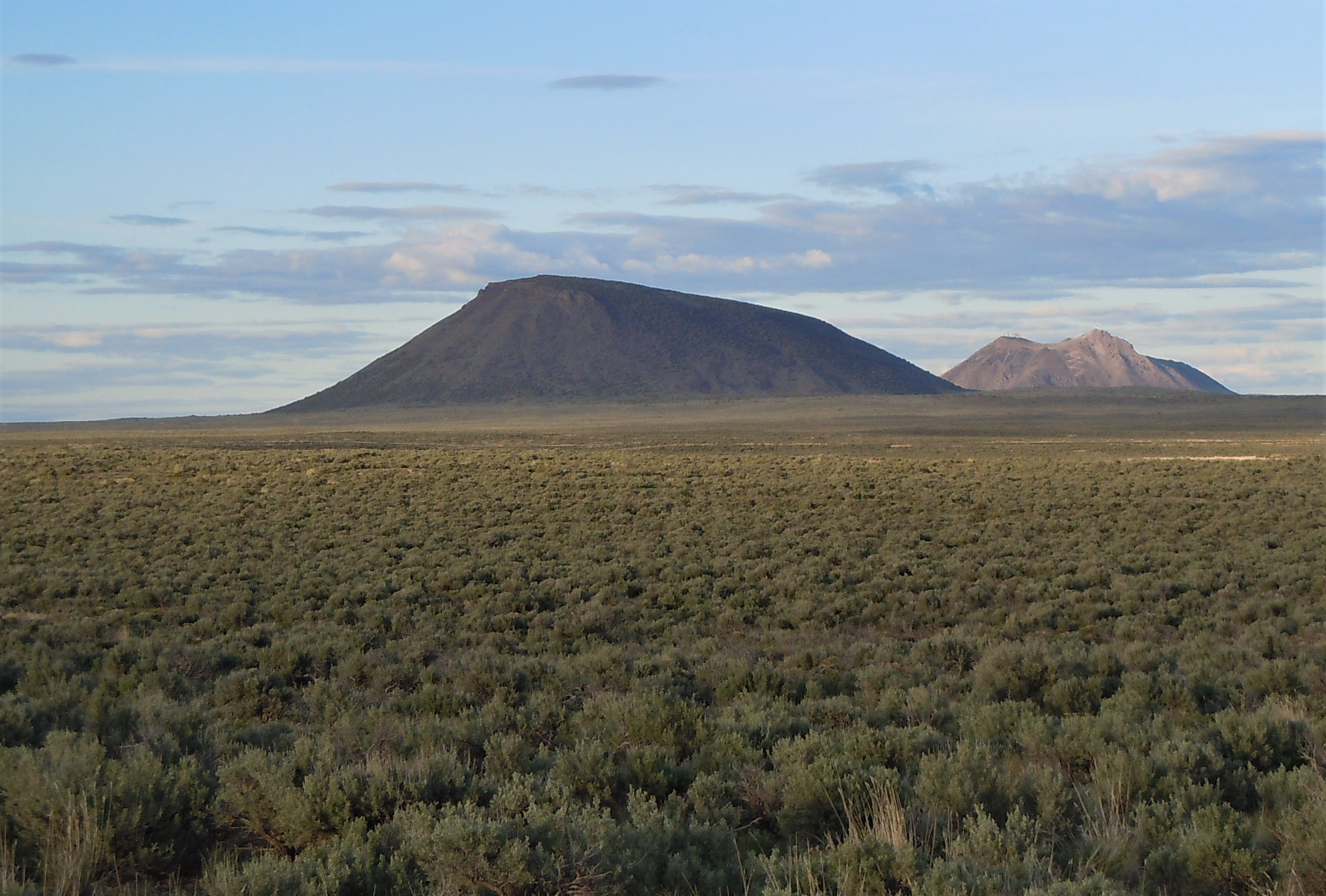
West aspect of Middle Butte centered with East Butte in the distance

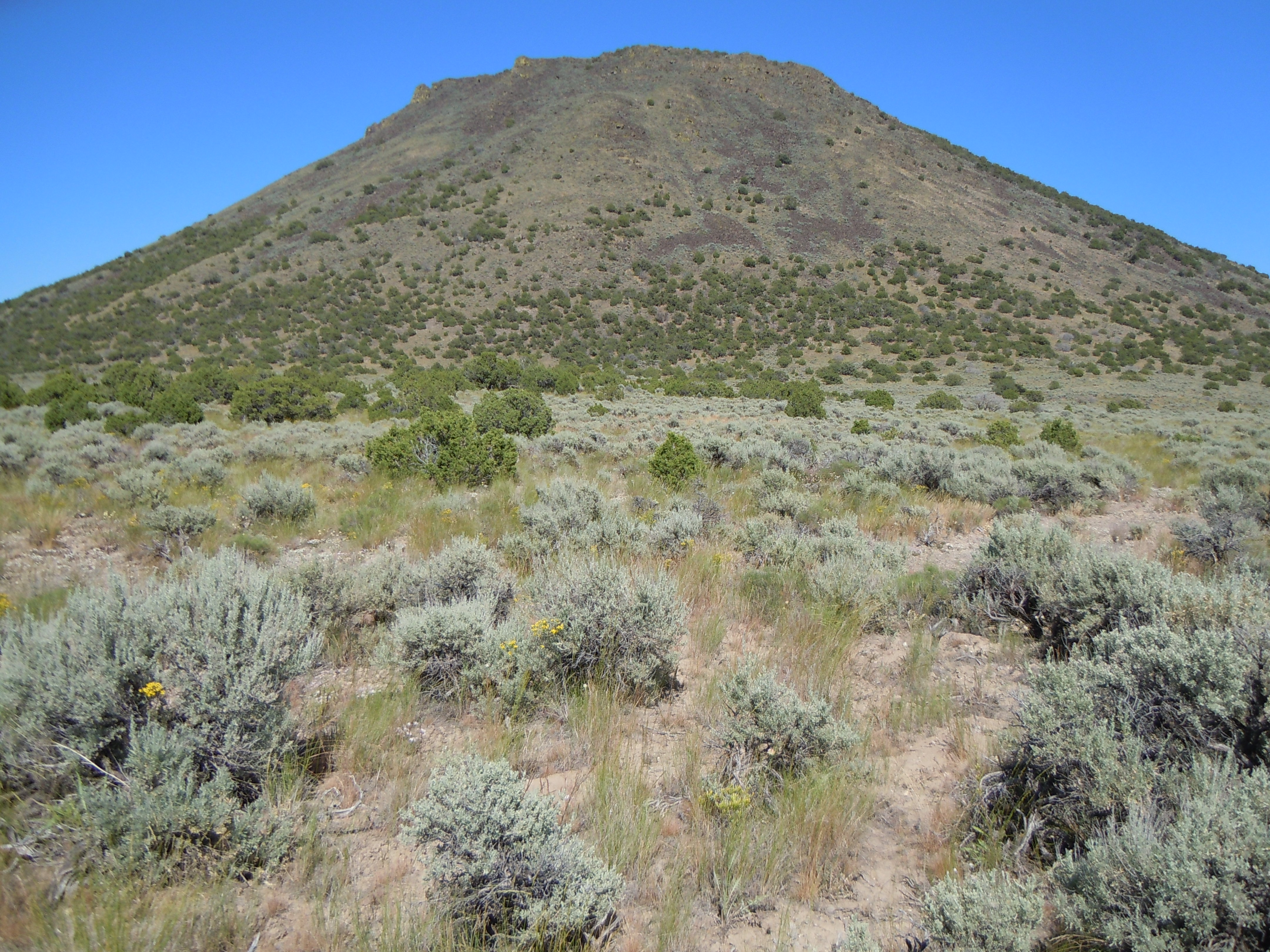
West slope

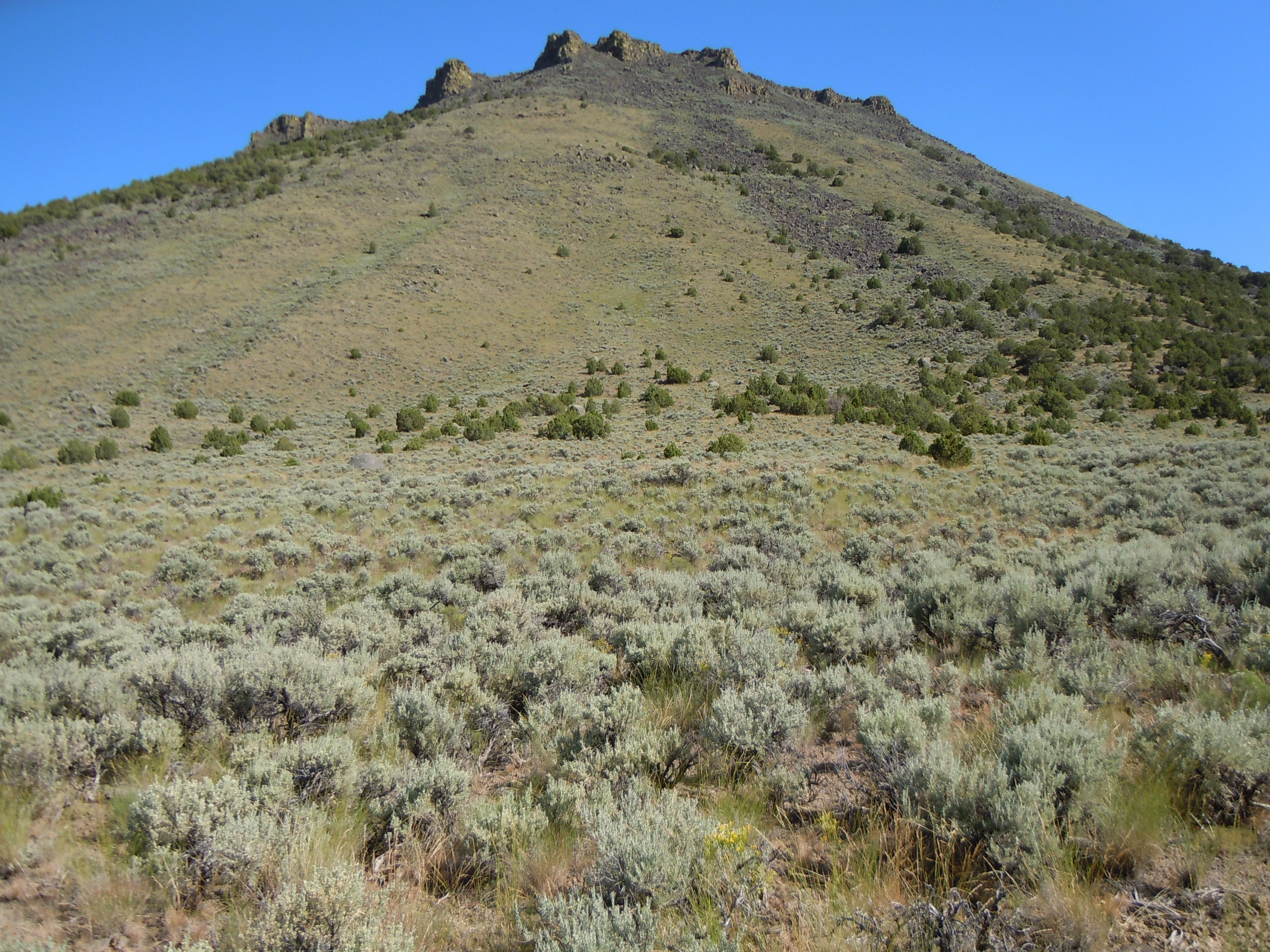
Northwest slope

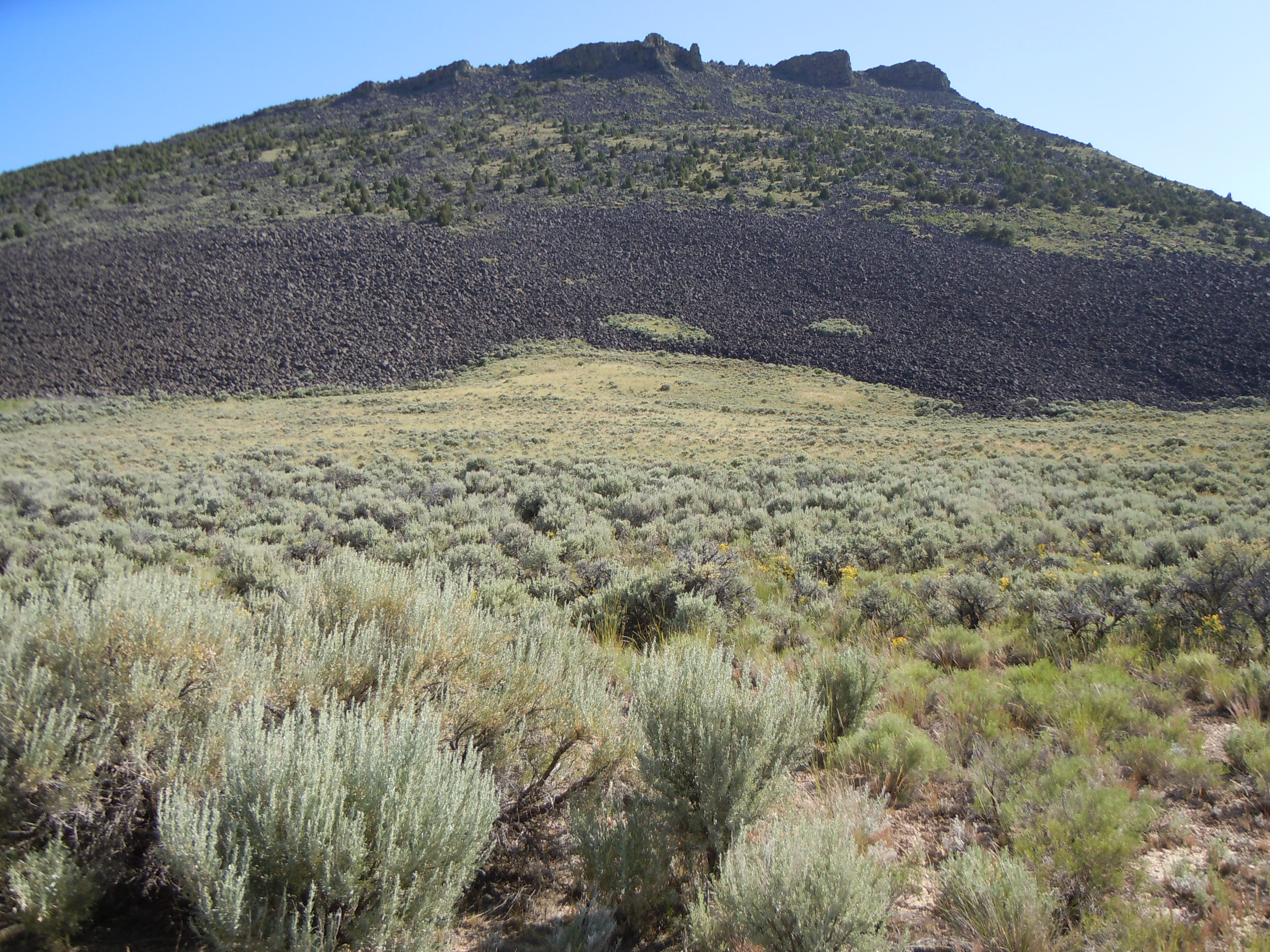
North slope

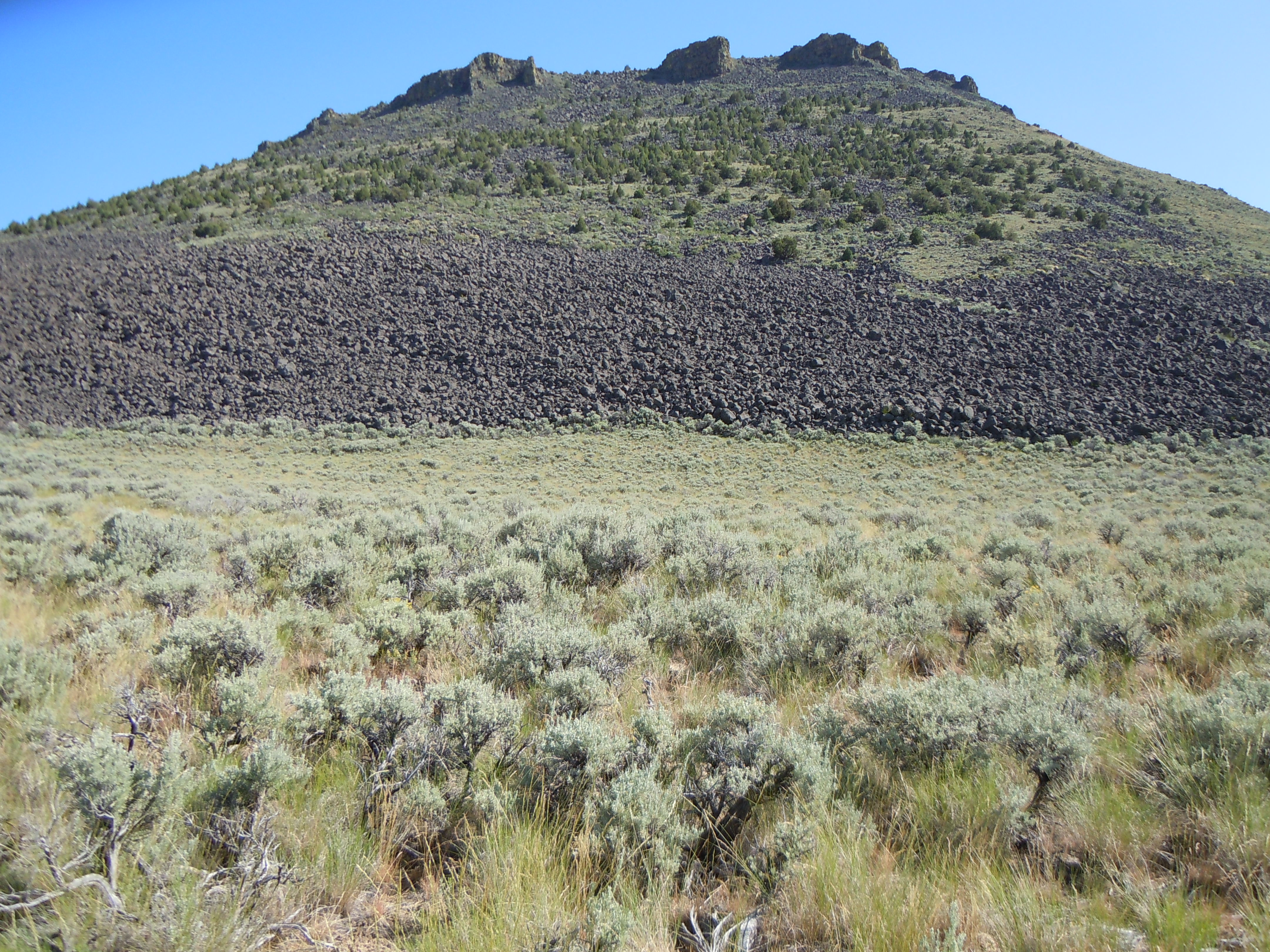
North slope with juniper above, and sagebrush in foreground

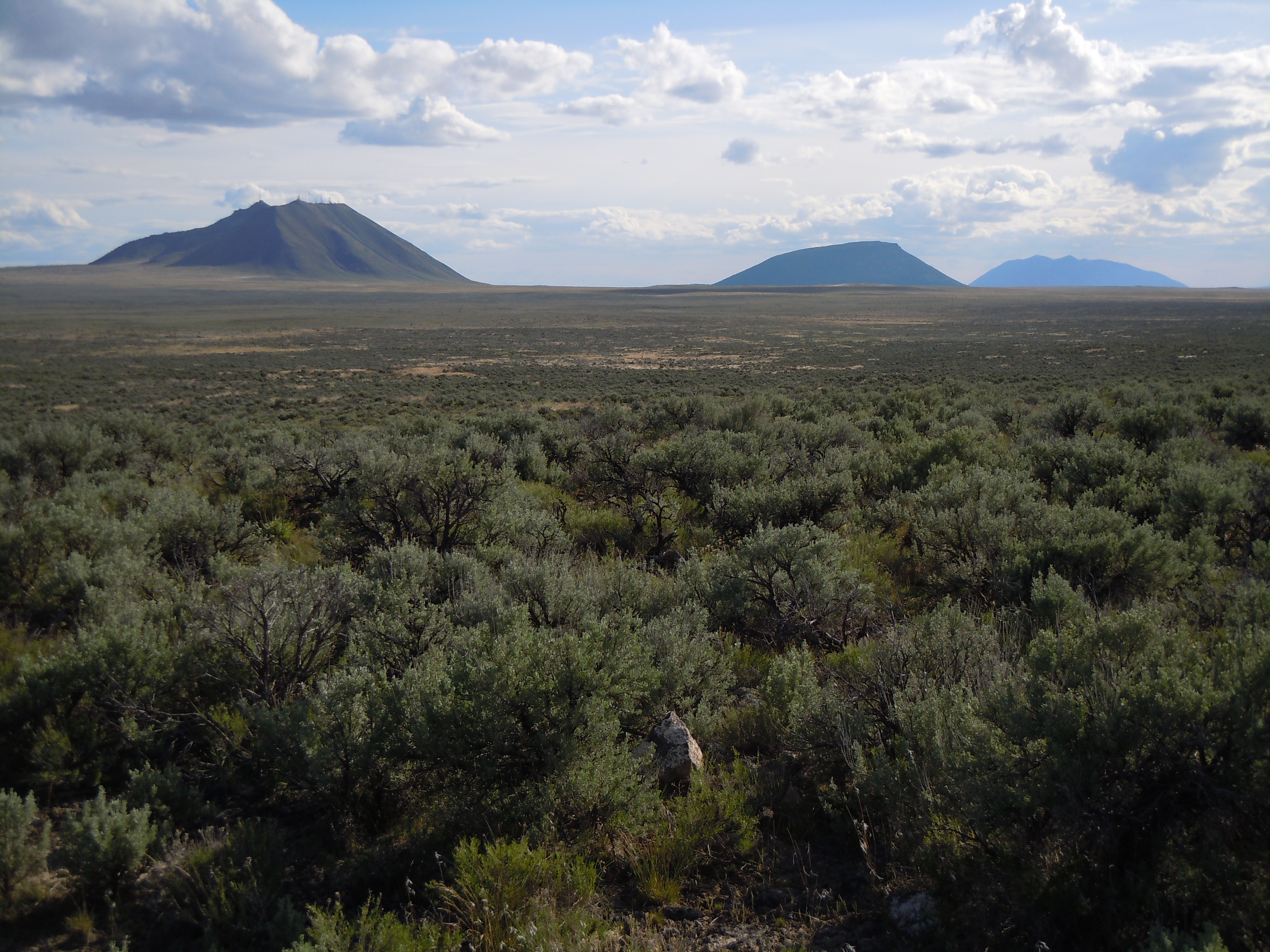
Left to right: East Butte, Middle Butte, Big Southern Butte

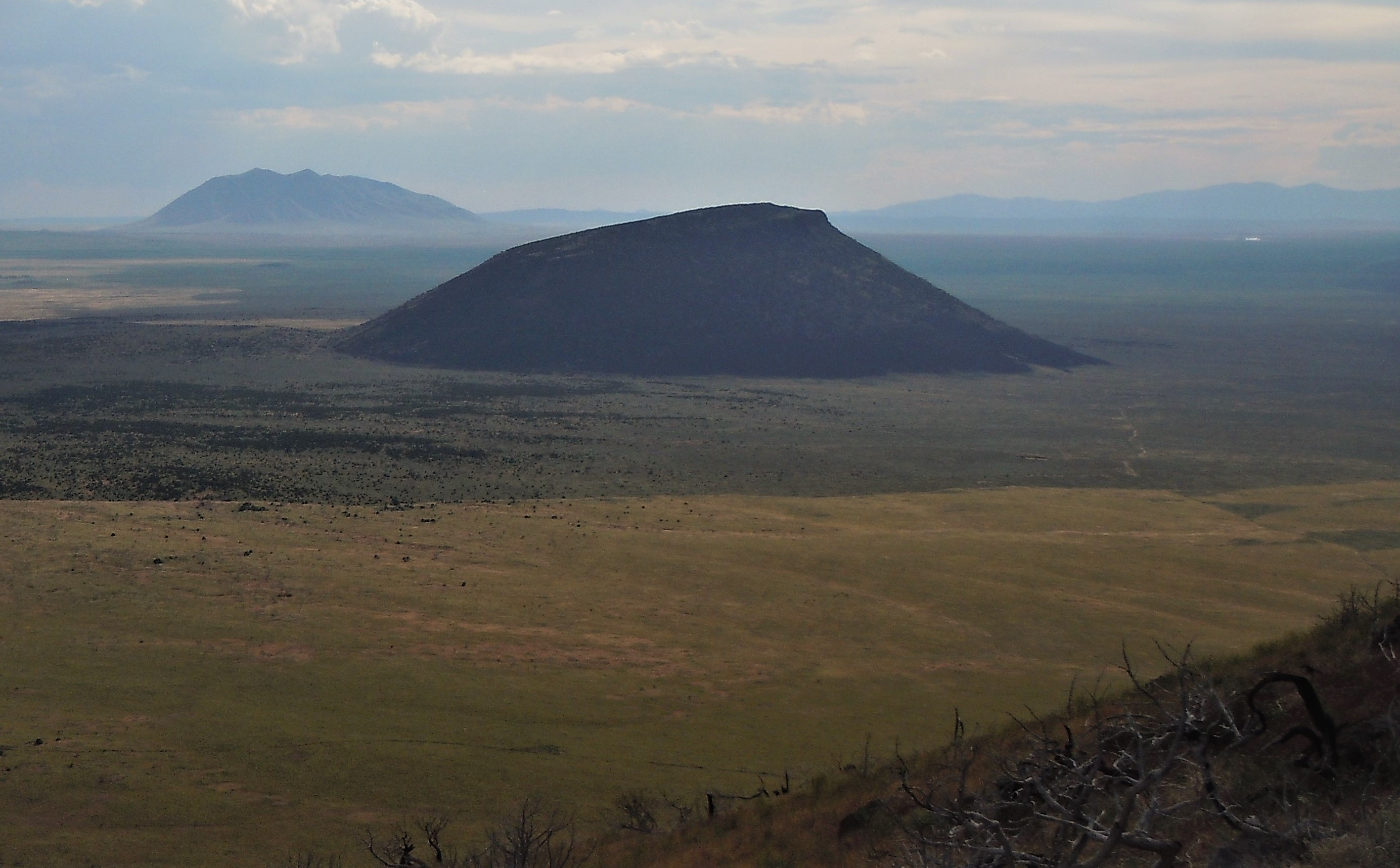
Middle Butte (center) and Big Southern Butte (upper left) rise above the Snake River Plain as seen from East Butte

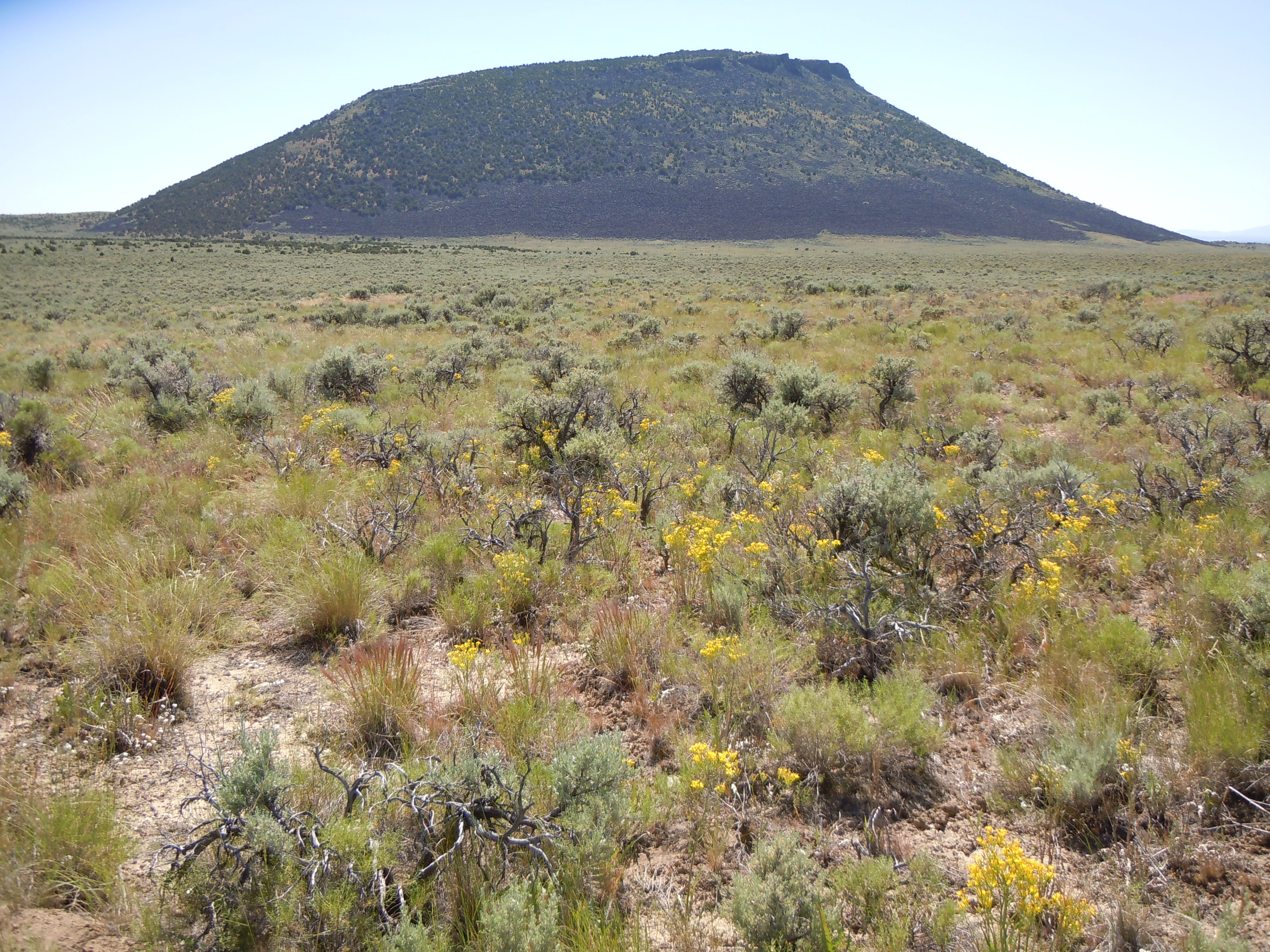
Northeast aspect

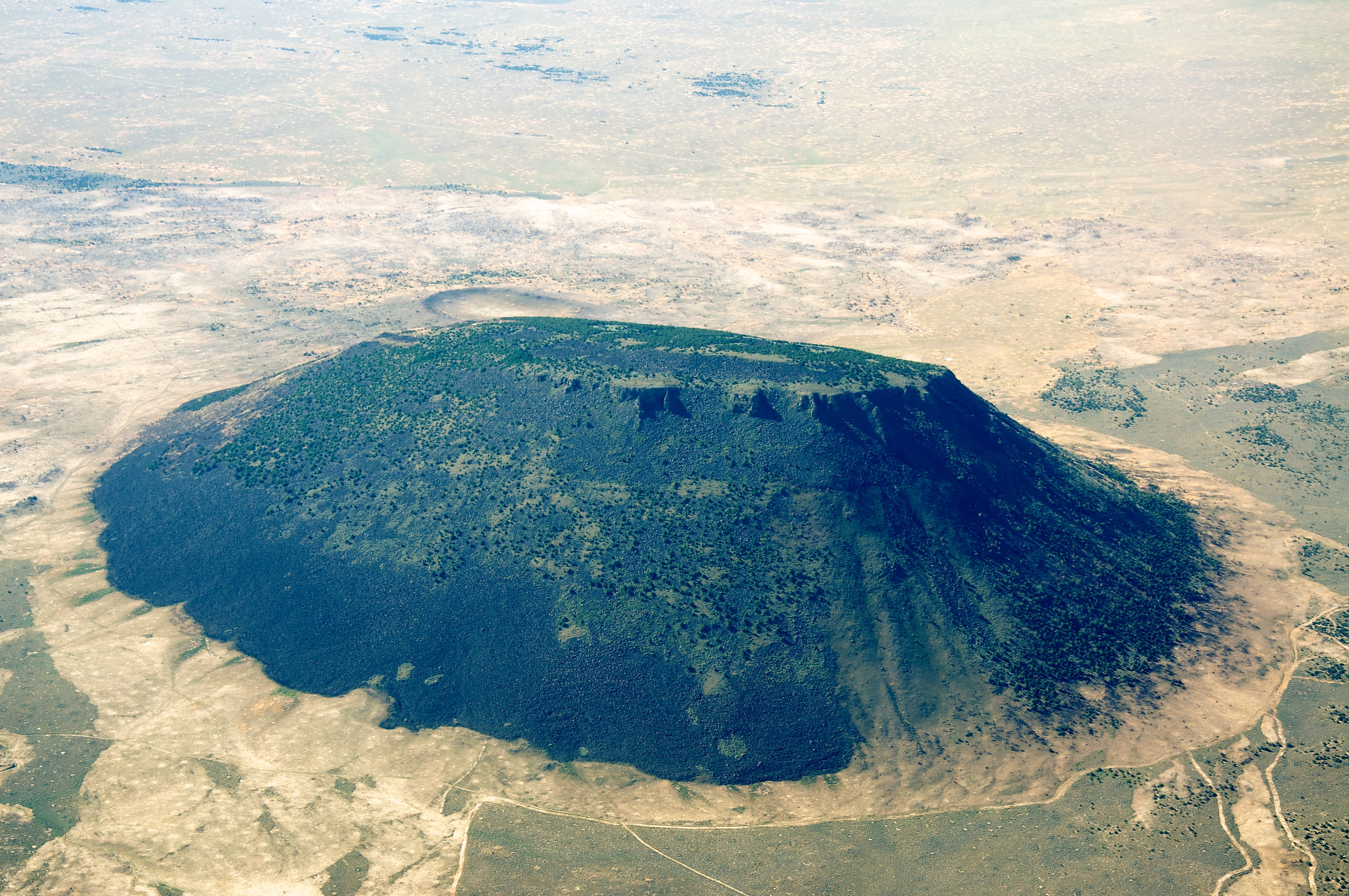
Aerial view

== See also ==
- List of mountain peaks of Idaho
