= East Butte =

Lava dome in Idaho, United States

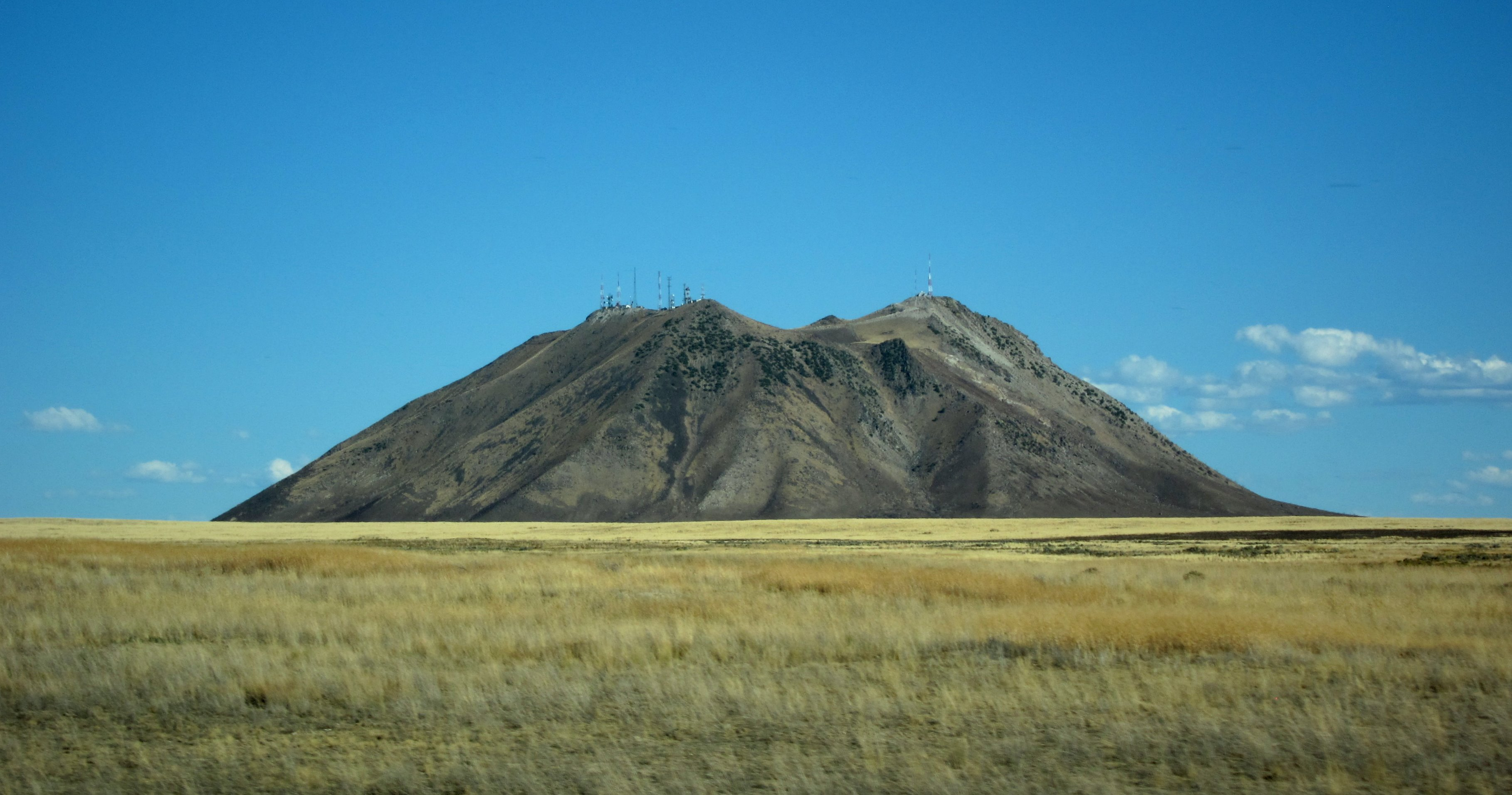
- West-northwest aspect

Highest point
- Elevation: 6,572 ft (2,003 m)
- Prominence: 1,542 ft (470 m)
- Parent peak: Big Southern Butte (7,550 ft)
- Isolation: 19.33 mi (31.11 km)
- Coordinates: 43°30′05″N 112°39′45″W

Geography
- Location within Idaho Location within the United States
- Country: United States of America
- State: Idaho
- County: Bingham
- Parent range: Snake River Plain; Rocky Mountains
- Topo map: USGS Little Butte SW

Geology
- Rock age: 600,000 years old
- Mountain type: Lava dome
- Rock type: Rhyolite

East Butte is a 6,572-foot elevation (2,003 m) summit located in Bingham County, Idaho, United States.

== Description ==
East Butte and line parent Big Southern Butte were major landmarks for early explorers and pioneers. The remote mountain is situated over 40 miles east of Craters of the Moon National Monument and Preserve, 32 miles west of the community of Idaho Falls, and can be seen from Highway 20 midway between Idaho Falls and Arco at milepost 274. East Butte is set on land belonging to the Idaho National Laboratory so access is restricted even though a road leads to multiple radio towers at the top. Topographic relief is modest as the summit rises over 1,200 feet (370 meters) above the Eastern Snake River Plain in one mile. This landform's toponym has been officially adopted by the United States Board on Geographic Names.

== Geology ==
East Butte is a lava dome composed of aphanitic rhyolite. It formed around 600,000 years ago as sialic magma flowed through a conduit in the basalt plain which surrounds the peak.

== Climate ==
East Butte is located in a cold semi-arid climate zone with warm summers and cold winters (Köppen BSk). Winter temperatures can drop below 0 °F with wind chill factors below −20 °F. Precipitation is relatively sparse.

== Gallery ==
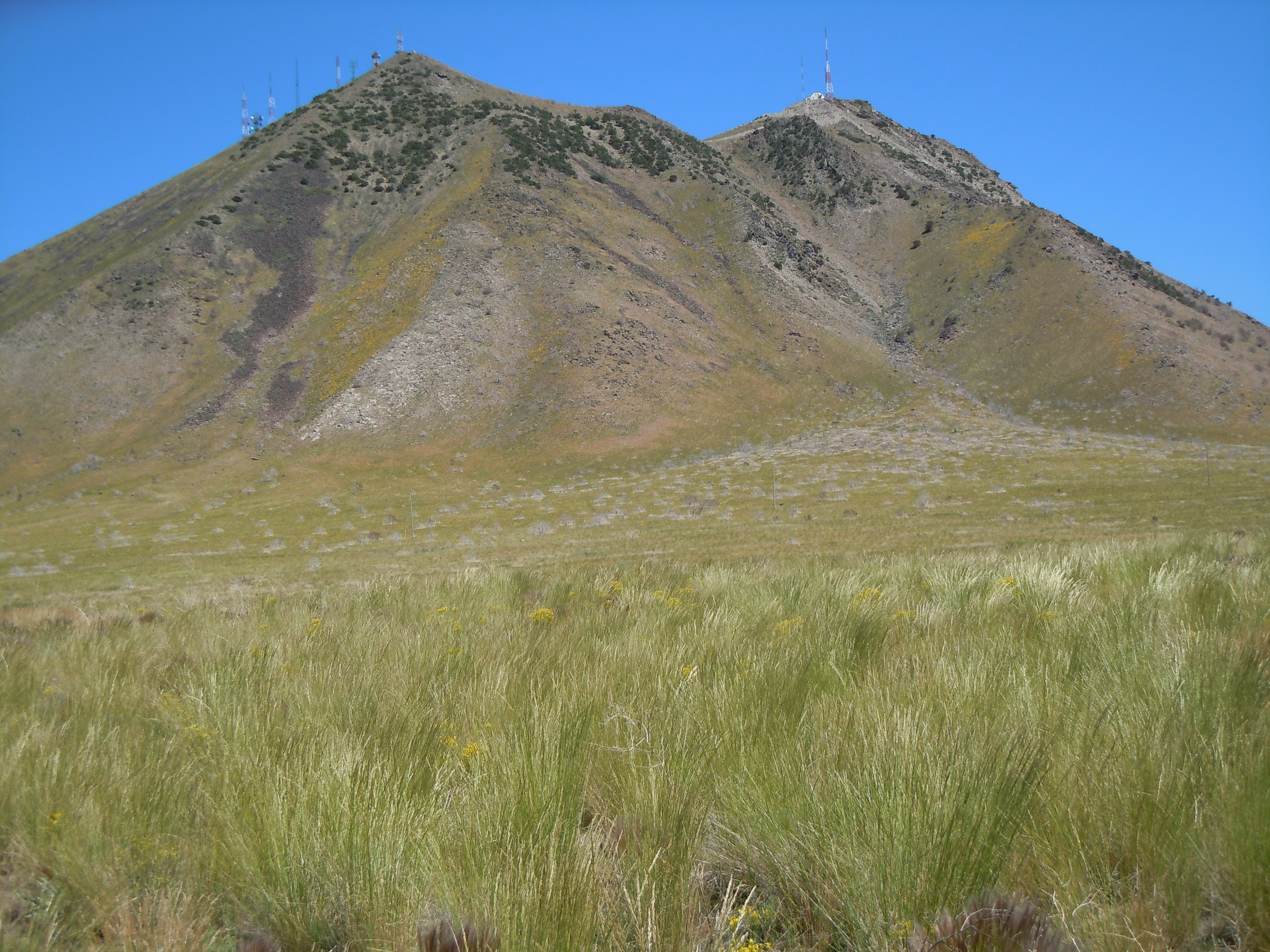
Northwest aspect

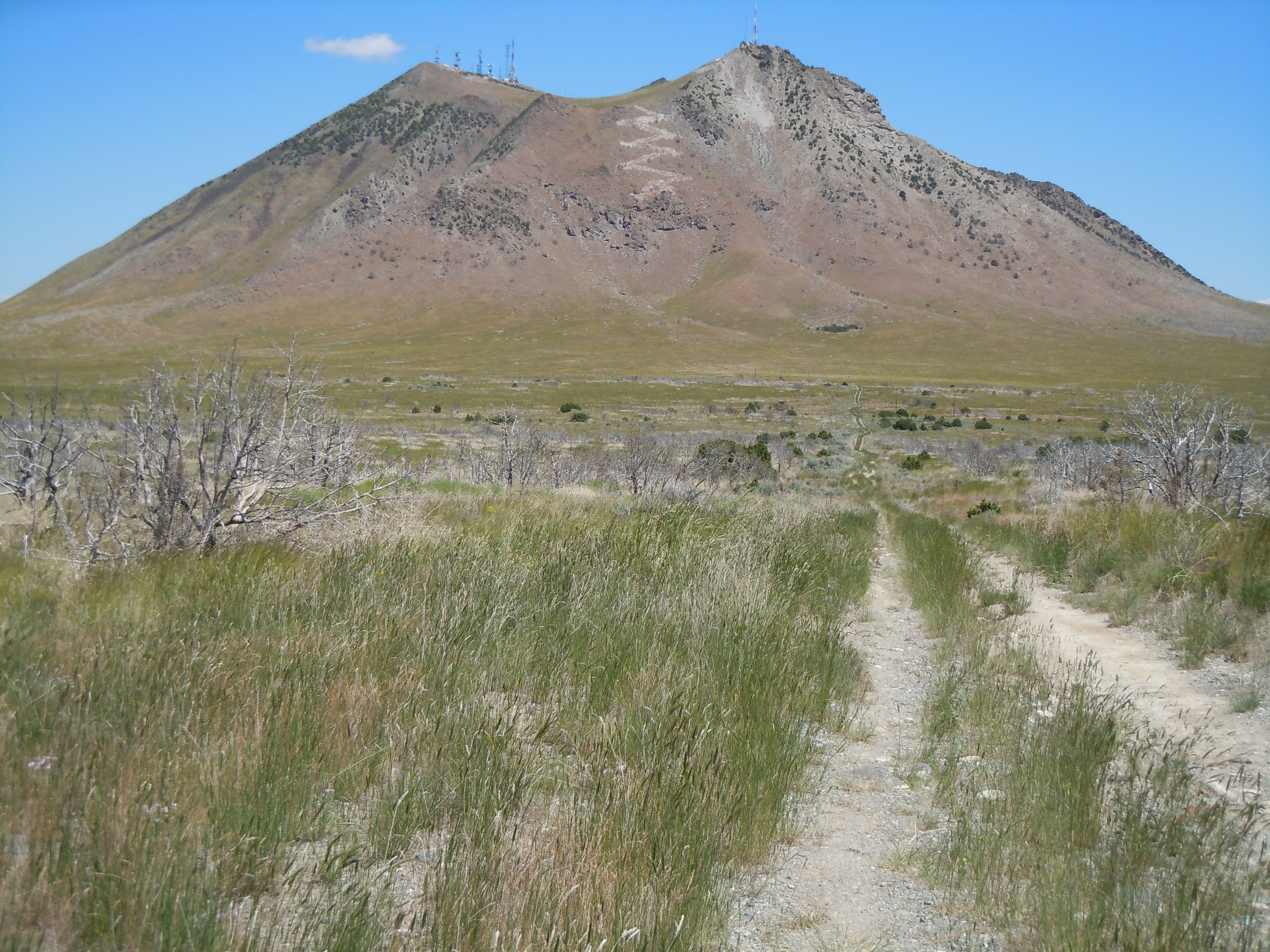
Southwest aspect

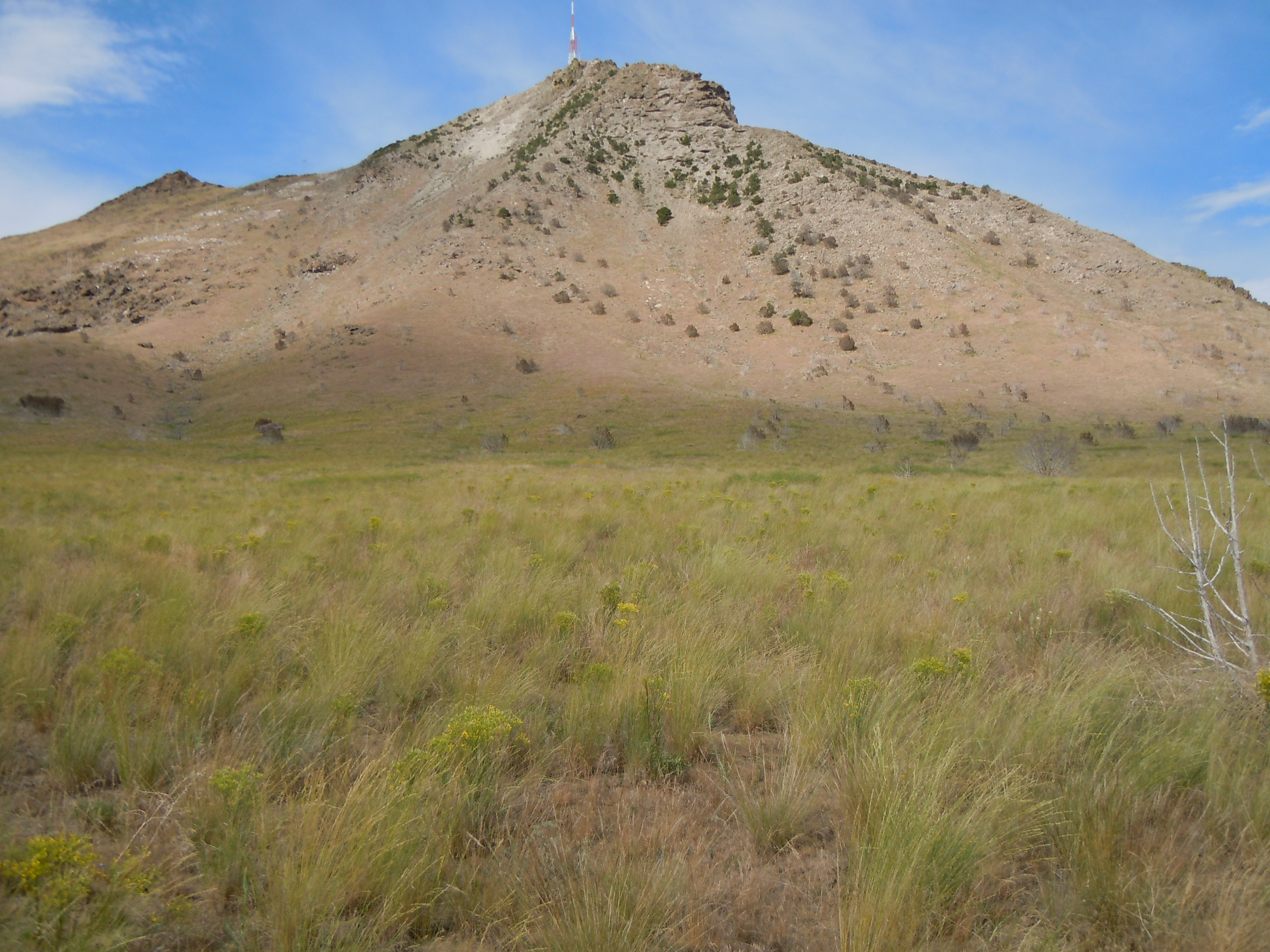
South aspect

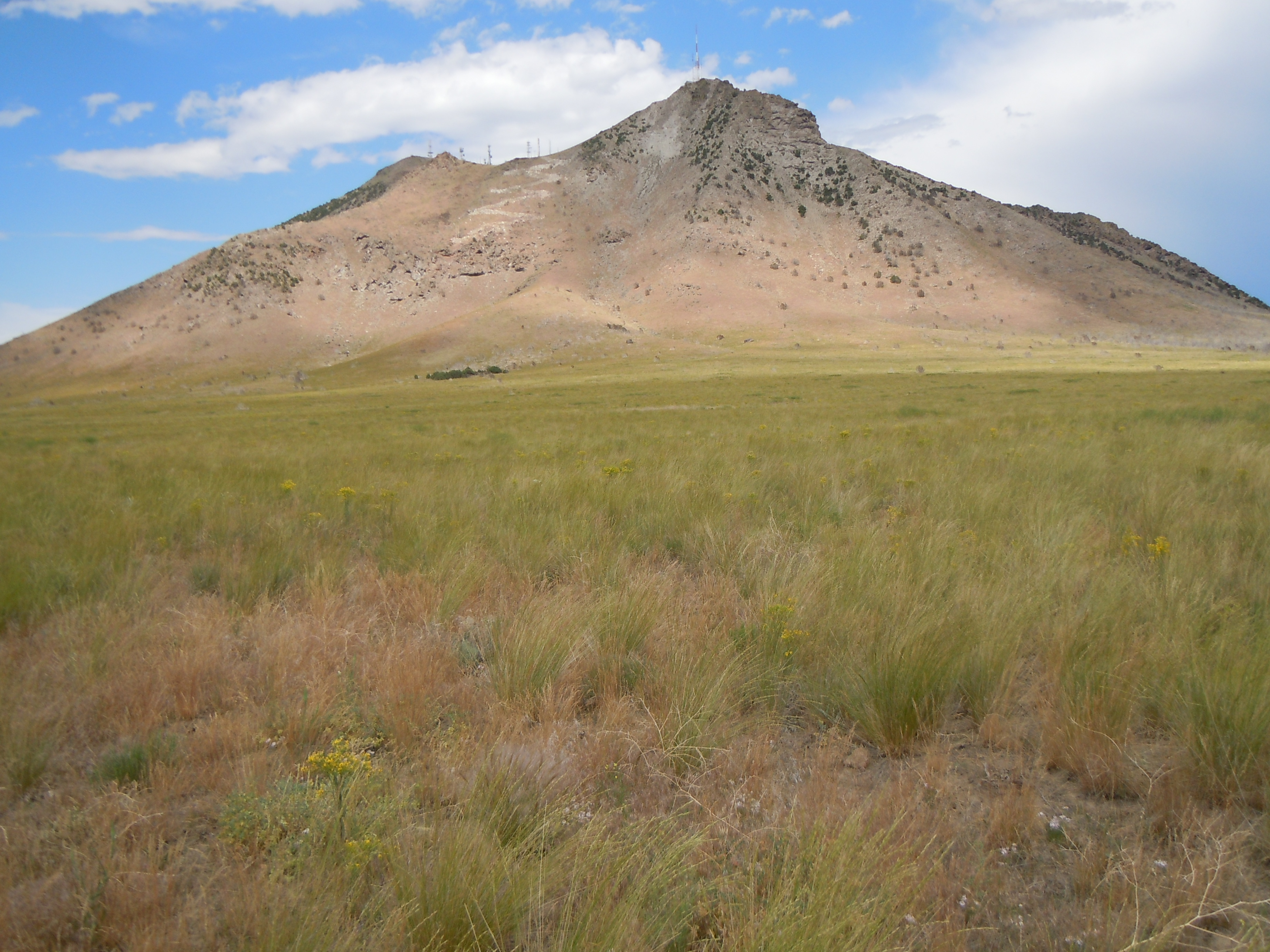
Southwest aspect

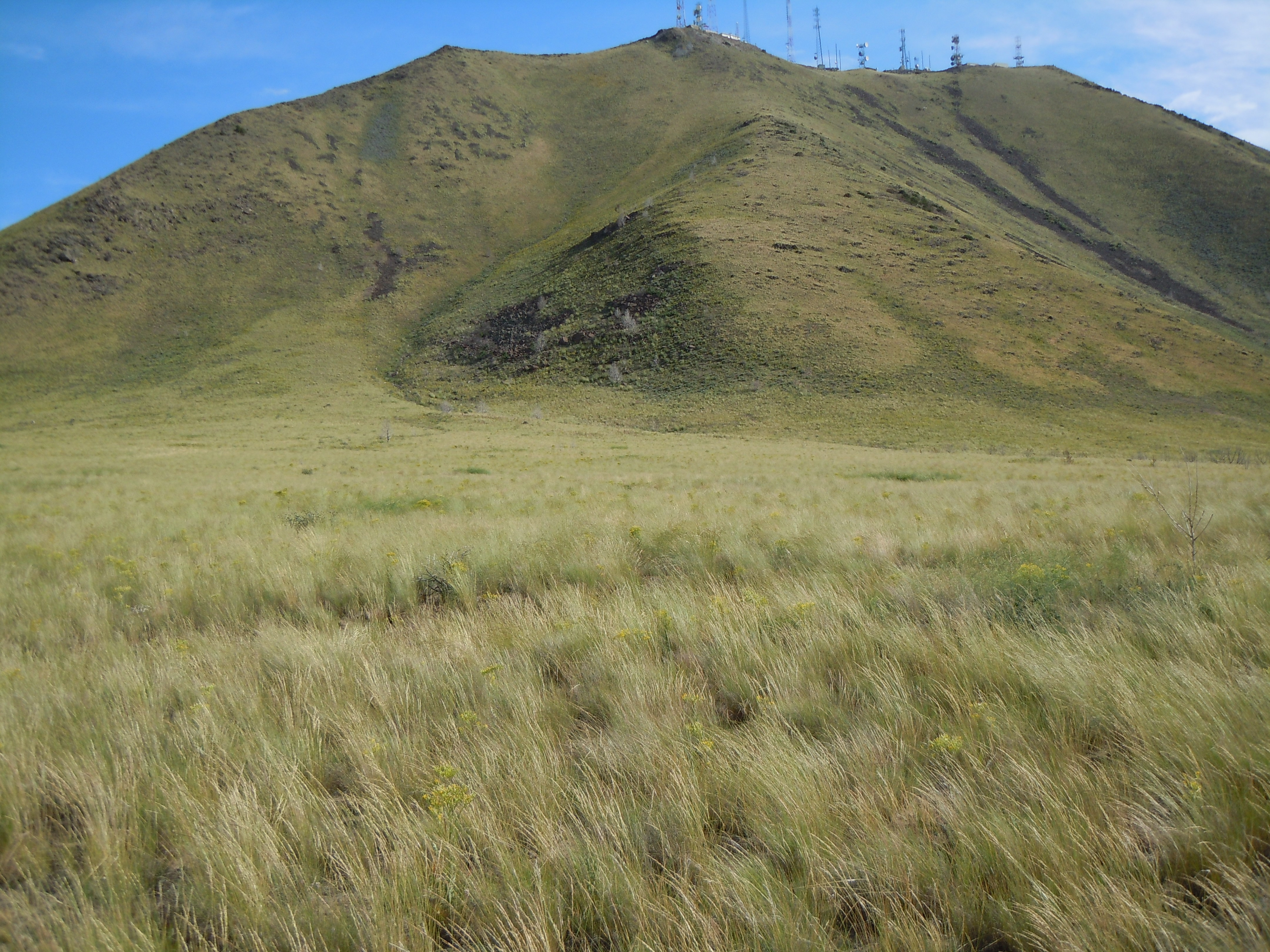
North aspect

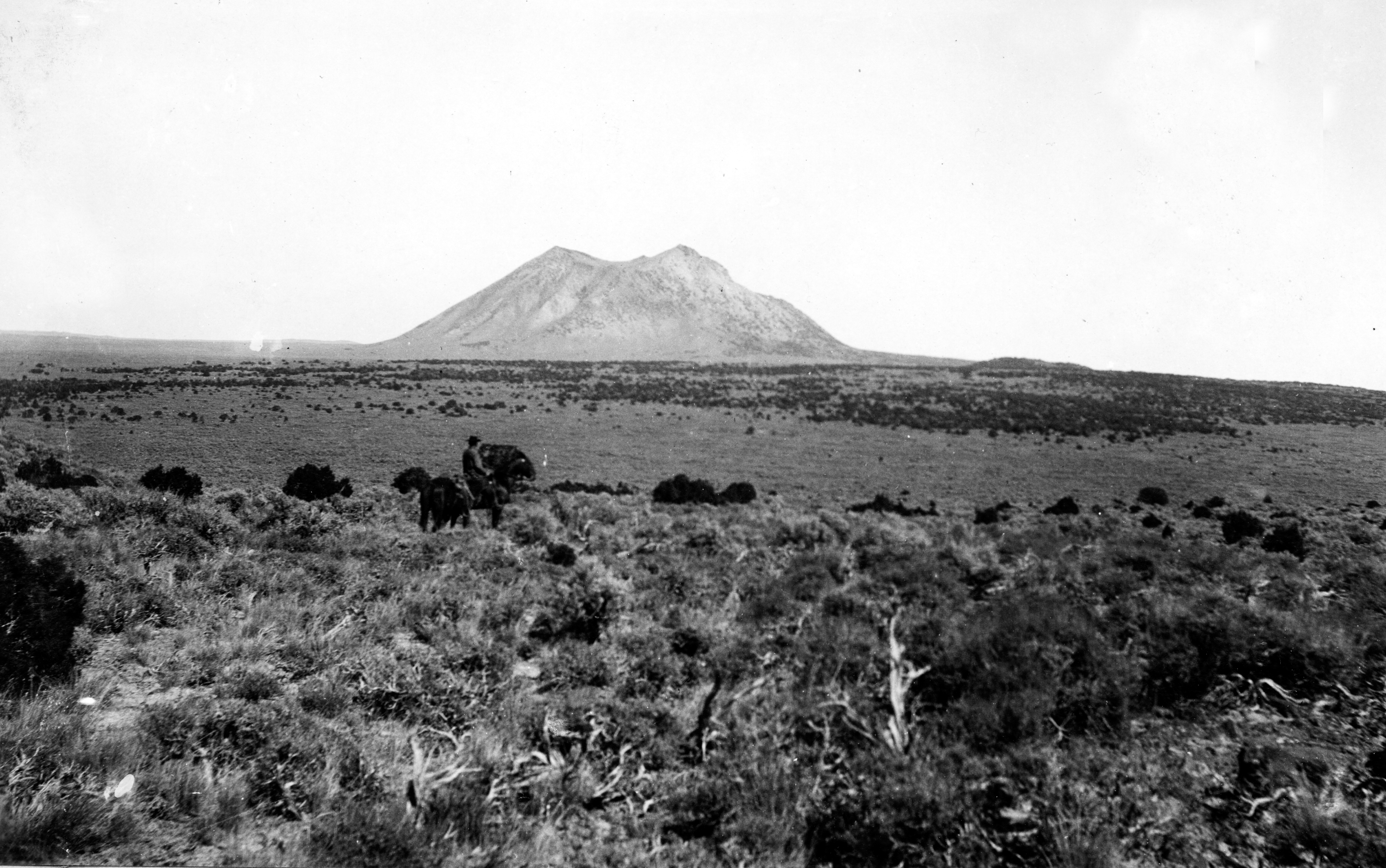
East Butte, 1901

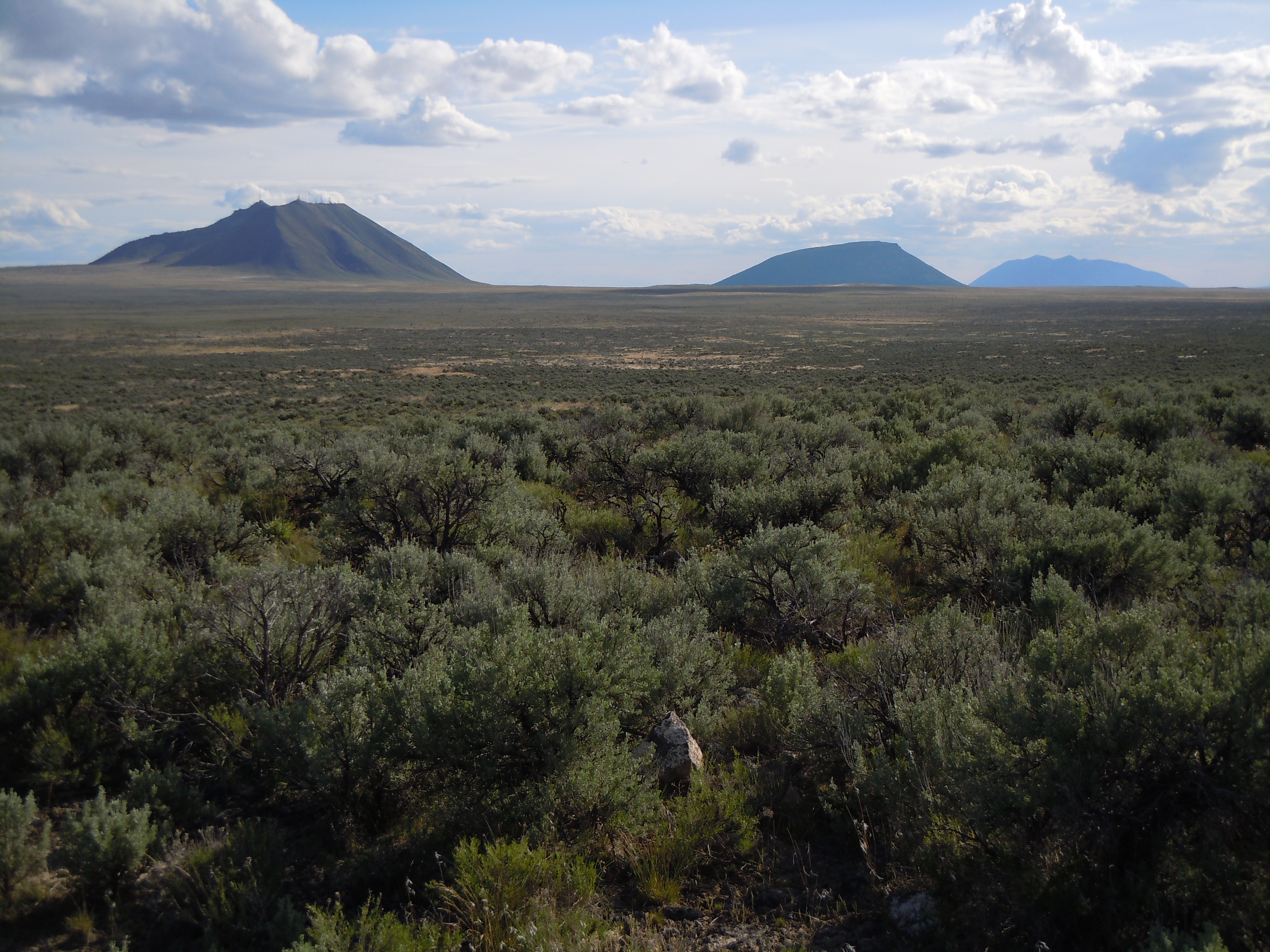
Left to right: East Butte, Middle Butte, Big Southern Butte

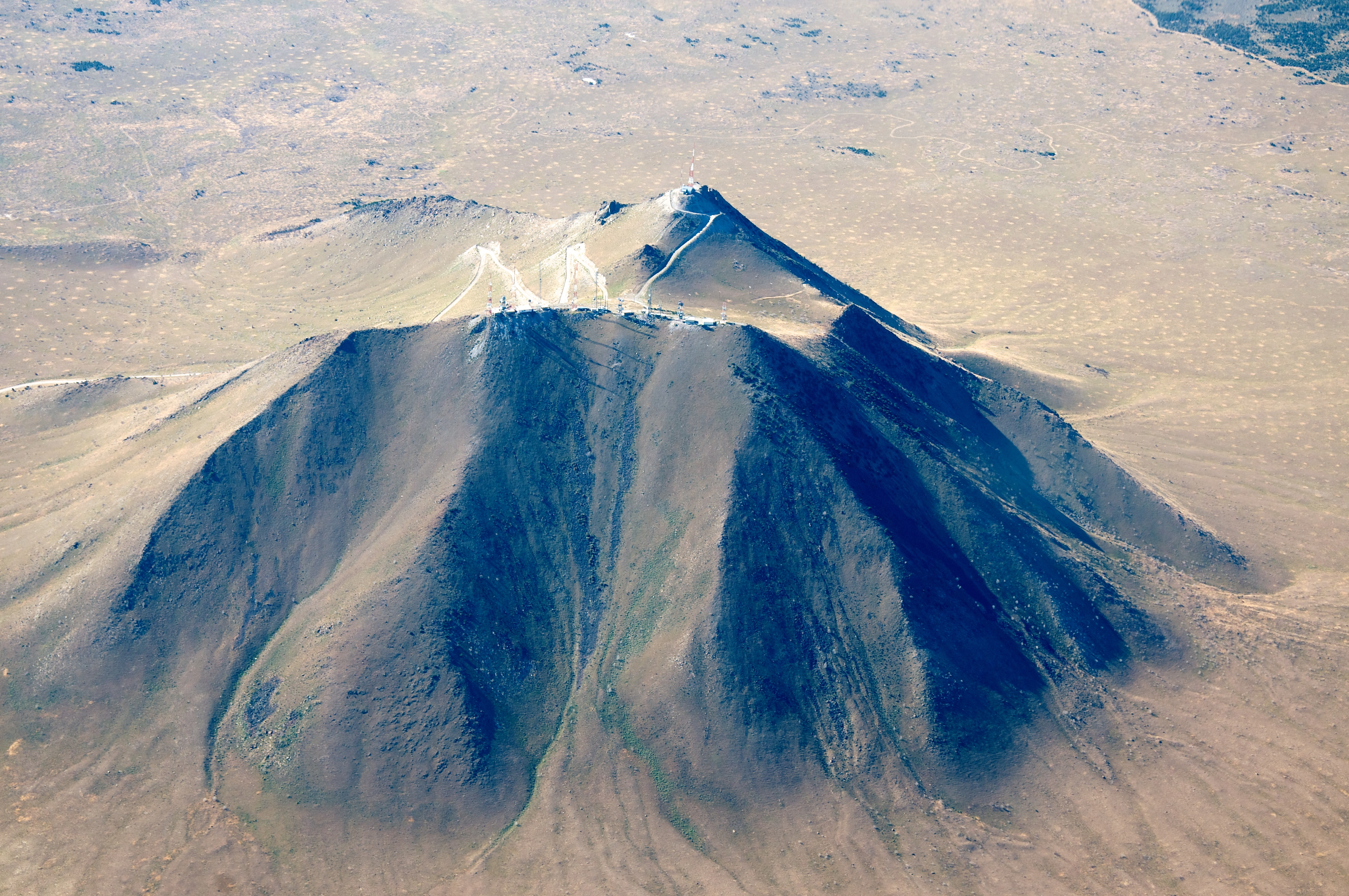
Aerial, looking south

== See also ==
- Middle Butte
- List of mountain peaks of Idaho
