= Seedskadee Project =

Water management on the Green River in Wyoming

Coordinates: 42°04′09″N 110°08′10″W

The Seedskadee Project is a water resources development project of the U.S. Bureau of Reclamation. The project focuses on the upper Green River in western Wyoming, storing the river's waters in Fontenelle Reservoir. The project is associated with the Colorado River Storage Project, retaining the waters of the Green for use in the upper Colorado Basin. Water held behind Fontenelle Dam, built from 1961 to 1968, is used for hydroelectric power generation and industrial use. The reservoir supports recreational use.

As originally conceived, the Seedskadee Project was planned to provide irrigation water for the high desert of western Wyoming. Authorized in 1956 with other elements of the Colorado River Storage Project, construction of the irrigation elements of the project were suspended in 1962 for study of the economics of high-altitude irrigation. The 512-acre (207 ha) Seedskadee Development Farm was established as a pilot operation to explore irrigation methods in cooperation with the U.S. Department of Agriculture and the University of Wyoming. As it became apparent that potential crops were limited to livestock fodder, precluding high-value crops that could provide a high return on investment, the attractiveness of irrigation faded. The farm operated until 1972 and has not operated since. The project chiefly protects Wyoming's water rights and provides water to mining and power generation activities in the Green River, Wyoming area.

== See also ==
- Seedskadee National Wildlife Refuge, established to mitigate wildlife habitat loss resulting from the construction of the Fontenelle Reservoir and Flaming Gorge Reservoir
