= Fontenelle Dam =

Dam on the Green River in Wyoming

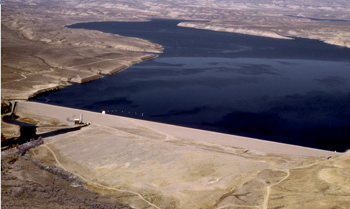
- Interactive map of Fontenelle Dam
- Location: Lincoln and Sweetwater counties, Wyoming, USA
- Coordinates: 42°01′42.4″N 110°03′37.9″W
- Construction began: 1961
- Opening date: 1964
- Operator: U.S. Bureau of Reclamation

Dam and spillways
- Type of dam: Zoned earthfill
- Impounds: Green River
- Height: 139 feet (42 m)
- Length: 5,421 feet (1,652 m)
- Dam volume: 5,265,000 yd^{3} (4,025,000 m^{3})
- Spillway type: Gated spillway
- Spillway capacity: 20,200 cu ft/s (570 m^{3}/s)

Reservoir
- Creates: Fontenelle Reservoir
- Total capacity: 345,360 acre-feet (426.00 GL)
- Catchment area: 4,156 mi^{2} (10,760 km^{2})

Power Station
- Hydraulic head: 121 ft (37 m)
- Turbines: 1 x 10 MW Francis-type
- Installed capacity: 10 MW

Fontenelle Dam was built between 1961 and 1964 on the Green River in southwestern Wyoming. The 139-foot (42 m) high zoned earthfill dam impounds the 345,360-acre-foot (0.42600 km^{3}) Fontenelle Reservoir. The dam and reservoir are the central features of the Seedskadee Project of the U.S. Bureau of Reclamation, which manages the Fontenelle impoundment primarily as a storage reservoir for the Colorado River Storage Project. The dam suffered a significant failure in 1965, when the dam's right abutment developed a leak. Emergency releases from the dam flooded downstream properties, but repairs to the dam were successful. However, in 1983 the dam was rated "poor" under Safety Evaluation of Existing Dams (SEED) criteria, due to continuing seepage, leading to an emergency drawdown. A concrete diaphragm wall was built through the core of the dam to stop leakage.

== Use ==
Initially conceived as a storage reservoir for irrigation water, the project was suspended for a time in 1962 to pursue a study of high-altitude irrigation methods. The results of the studies caused the cancellation of many irrigation features for the project. The primary project rationale evolved to support Wyoming water rights in the Colorado River basin, retaining water that would otherwise go downstream to states in the lower Colorado basin. The dam provides power generation as a secondary feature. One motivation for the deferral of irrigation activities was the discovery of trona in the southern portion of the proposed irrigated region. As the extraction of trona was a higher-value activity, the removal of those lands from the project made the irrigation project nonviable.

== Construction ==
Development of the upper Green River basin was included in a 1946 Bureau of Reclamation report on the Colorado River basin. A 1950 supplementary report dealt with details of the proposed Seedskadee Project, followed by another addendum in 1953. The Colorado River Storage Project, including the Seedskadee Project, was authorized by Congress in 1956. Initial planning was completed in 1959, and amended in 1961 to increase the capacity of Fontenelle Reservoir to 345,400 acre-feet (0.4260 km^{3}), making the construction of a powerplant feasible. Work was stopped on irrigation infrastructure in 1962. The dam featured unusually large outlet works, capable of discharging 18,000 cu ft/s (510 m^{3}/s) (compared with a spillway capacity of 20,200 cu ft/s (570 m^{3}/s)) because the outlet works could be increased in size at lower cost than the spillway.

The first element of construction at Fontenelle Dam was the building of the Fortenelle community, the base camp for construction, with work starting in 1961 to build prefabricated relocatable houses for dam workers. The contract for the base camp was awarded to and completed by the D.H. Butcher & Co. construction company. The construction contract for the dam was awarded on June 13, 1961, to Foley Brothers, Inc. and the Holland Construction Company of St. Paul, Minnesota, with construction starting on June 30, at a cost of $7.9 million. The surface of the bedrock at the dam's base was found to be fragmented so the cut-off trench intended to preclude water infiltrating under the dam was deepened by 6 feet (1.8 m). The exposed rock was not prepared or smoothed with concrete. The foundation grouting required an unusually large amount of material to fill cracks in the upper 65 feet (20 m), with additional grouting required at the right abutment and outlet works. Work on the dam was completed by the end on 1963, with final completion on April 24, 1964. Work on the powerplant started in 1963, with completion in 1965.

== Partial failure ==
Problems with the embankment became apparent in May 1964, when part of the backfill slid into the stilling basin downstream, attributed to too-fast lowering of the reservoir level. When the reservoir had filled to 10% of capacity, seepage became apparent at the dam's base, with further seepage observed about 4,000 feet (1,200 m) below the dam from shale outcroppings. In July 1965 another slide occurred in the area of the stilling basin.

A significant leak appeared on September 3, 1965, at the west abutment, starting as a wet spot that grew with time. The weakened downstream face lost 10,000 cubic yards (7,600 m^{3}) of material that slid into the stilling basin, accompanied by continuing water flow, a condition known as "hydraulic piping." Work began the next day to lower the reservoir, with a 24-hour watch on the dam. The wet spot became a waterspout, flowing at a rate of between 10 and 12 million gallons per day.

On September 6 a 15-foot (4.6 m) by 20-foot (6.1 m) sinkhole developed on the upstream face of the dam's crest, which workers immediately filled with riprap bulldozed from the nearby dam surface into the hole. The hole was 30 feet (9.1 m) deep, with the bottom 11 feet (3.4 m) below the level of the reservoir, with only 45 feet (14 m) of dam structure remaining between the sinkhole and the downstream face. Further collapse could have created a breach in the dam, leading to total failure. Leakage did not increase during the incident. The emergency release of water flooded areas along the Green River downstream, damaging ranches and homes. The unusually large outlet works allowed the reservoir to be drawn down by as much as 4 feet (1.2 m) per day, a measure not available eleven years later at Teton Dam.

The reservoir was drawn down further during the remainder of the year, and work began on repairs to the embankment, along with an intensive program of pressure-grouting at the abutment and down the centerline of the dam embankment. Work continued through 1966, with a complete replacement of the right abutment embankment. The reservoir was partly refilled in the spring of 1967 to check the efficacy of the grouting work, which consumed 200,000 cubic feet (5,700 m^{3}) of grout. Water was released through the power penstock with the turbine and generator removed while the outlet works were repaired. Twenty-three observation wells were drilled at this time. The reservoir was fully refilled in the summer of 1968.

Subsequent evaluations described failure as "narrowly averted." The near-failure was not widely reported, but did cause organizations, other than the Bureau of Reclamation, to change their design and construction practices for embankment dams. The Bureau of Reclamation concluded that water used in mixing concrete was contaminated with trona. The Bureau concluded that the sodium carbonate in the trona accelerated setting of the grout in the original grout curtain, leaving it weak and fissured.

== Safety evaluation ==
As a result of the catastrophic failure of the closely similar Teton Dam under much the same circumstances in 1976, the Safety Evaluation of Existing Dams (SEED) program was initiated in the late 1970s and early 1980s. The 1983 report on Fontenelle Dam rated the dam "poor," the second-lowest rating. The report noted increasing seepage, similar in nature to the seepage that caused the 1965 failure. Plans were advanced in 1984 to build a 600-foot (180 m) long concrete wall at the east canal outlet works to evaluate its efficacy. However, in May 1985, operators initiated an emergency drawdown of the reservoir after deciding that the dam was "in very serious distress." With the fast drawdown, slumping appeared on the upstream face. The reservoir was entirely drained. In September work began on the trenching of an 840-foot (260 m) test section of 24-inch (61 cm) thick concrete diaphragm wall into the core of the dam, using the "Hydrofraise" system of grout trenching, extending 40 feet (12 m) to 50 feet (15 m) below the base of the dam into bedrock. The reservoir was to be kept empty in 1986, but heavy spring runoff carried logs and tumbleweeds into the reservoir, clogging the outlet works. The reservoir partially filled, preventing flooding in the town of Green River, but creating anxiety about possible failure of the dam, which was retaining fifty feet of water, rising at times five feet in a day. An environmental assessment of the repair program noted that the only alternative was an intentional and permanent breaching of the center section of the dam, leaving local industries without water. The test section of wall was completed, and a full-length wall was considered, but the completed section appeared to have solved the leakage problem.

== See also ==
- Teton Dam, a similar design which failed catastrophically in 1976 under similar circumstances after a leak developed at the dam's abutment when the reservoir was filled.
