= Big Southern Butte =

Mountain in the United States of America

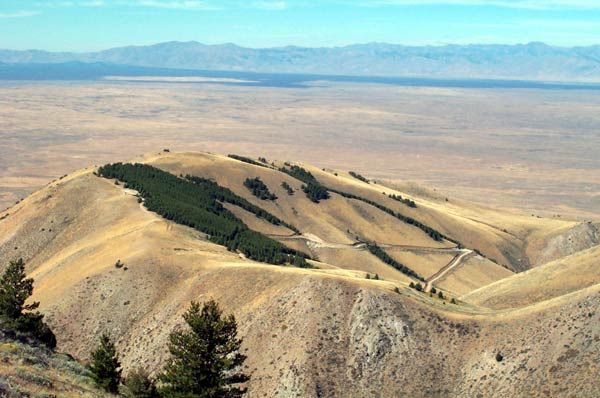
- Big Southern Butte

Highest point
- Elevation: 7,550 ft (2,300 m)
- Prominence: 2,380 ft (730 m)
- Coordinates: 43°24′05″N 113°01′26″W

Geography
- Location: Butte County, Idaho, United States
- Topo map: USGS Big Southern Butte

Geology
- Rock age: 300,000 years
- Mountain type: Lava dome

U.S. National Natural Landmark
- Designated: 1976

Big Southern Butte is the largest and youngest (300,000 years old) of three rhyolitic domes formed over a million years near the center of the Eastern Snake River Plain in the U.S. state of Idaho. It is one of the largest volcanic domes on Earth. It rises approximately 2500 vertical feet (762 m) above the lava plain in southern Butte County, east of Craters of the Moon National Monument.

Big Southern Butte consists of two coalesced lava domes with a base diameter of 6.5 kilometres (4.0 mi) and a combined volume of approximately 8 cubic kilometres (1.9 cu mi).

== See also ==
- East Butte
- Middle Butte

== Gallery ==
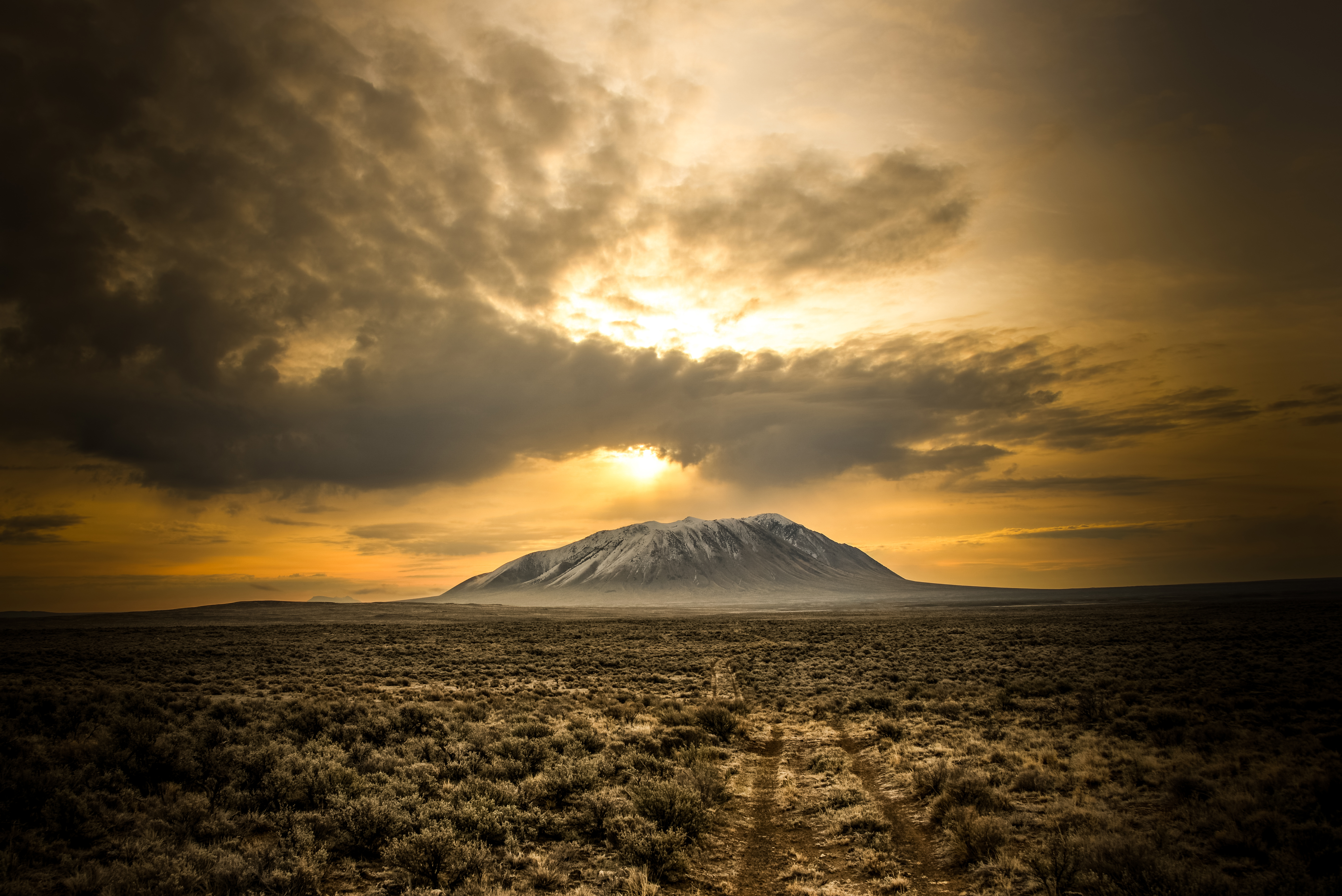
Big Southern Butte

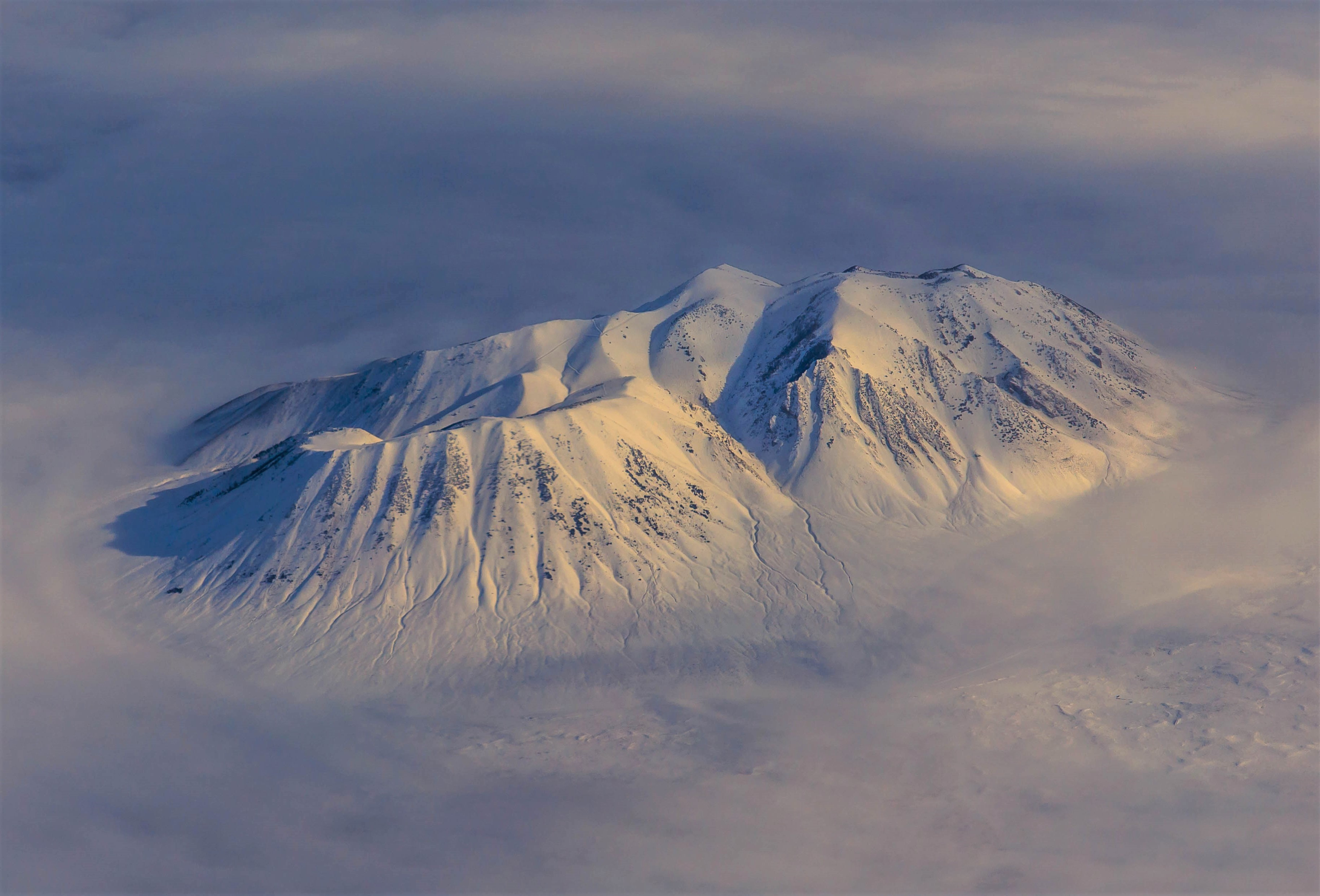
Aerial view from southwest

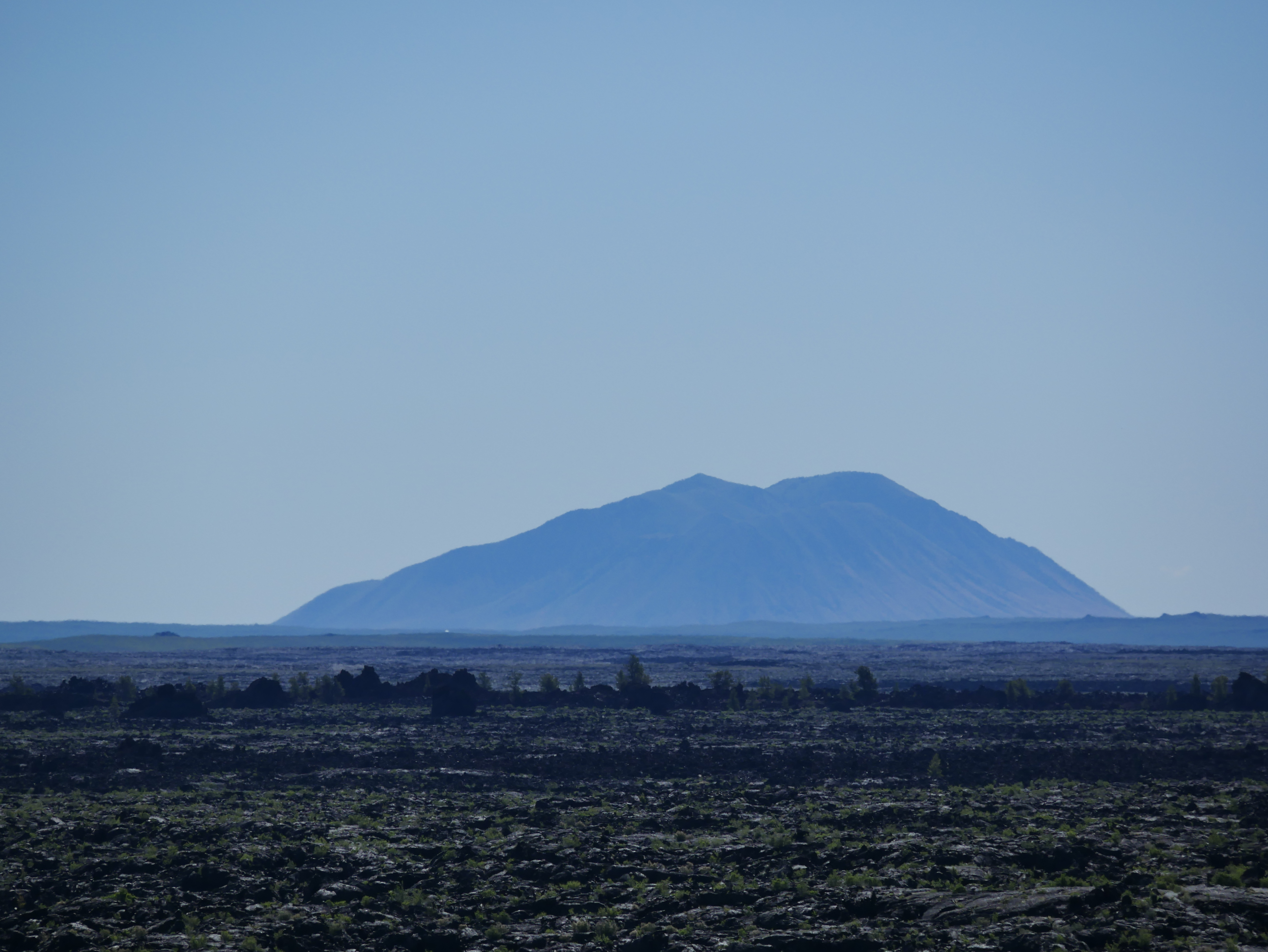
from Craters of the Moon
