= Fontanelle (disambiguation) =

A fontanelle is a soft spot on an infant human skull.

- Anterior fontanelle
- Posterior fontanelle
- Sphenoidal fontanelle (or Pterion)
- Mastoid fontanelle (or Asterion (anatomy))

Fontanelle may also refer to:

== Places ==
Italy

- Fontanelle, Campello sul Clitunno
- Fontanelle, Montichiari
- Fontanelle, Veneto
- Fontanelle cemetery, Naples

United States

- Fontanelle, Iowa
- Fontanelle, Nebraska
- Fontanel Mansion, a log home in Nashville, Tennessee

== Other uses ==
- Fontanelle (album), a 1992 album by Babes in Toyland
- Fontanelle, a 2002 novel by Meir Shalev
- Nasone or fontanella (plural fontanelle), a type of drinking fountain found in Rome, Italy

== See also ==
- Fontanella (disambiguation)
- Fontenelle (disambiguation)
