= Fontenelle Abbey (disambiguation) =

Fontenelle Abbey, or Abbey of Saint Wandrille, is a Benedictine monastery in Saint-Wandrille-Rançon, Seine-Maritime, France

Fontenelle Abbey may also refer to:

- Fontenelle Abbey (Nord), former Cistercian nunnery in Maing, Nord, France
- Fontenelles Abbey, former Augustinian monastery in La Roche-sur-Yon, Vendée, France

== See also ==
- Fontenelle (disambiguation)
