= Fontanella =

Fontanella may refer to:

- Fontanella, Austria
- Fontanella, Lombardy, a comune in the Province of Bergamo, Italy
- Nasone, or fontanella, a type of drinking fountain found in Rome, Italy

== People with the surname ==
- Francesc Fontanella (1622-1685?), Catalan poet, dramatist, and priest
- Mario Fontanella (born 1989), Italian footballer
- Vittorio Fontanella (born 1953), Italian middle-distance runner

== See also ==
- Fontanelle (disambiguation)
- Fontenelle (disambiguation)
