= La Fontenelle =

La Fontenelle is the name of two communes in France:

- La Fontenelle, Ille-et-Vilaine
- La Fontenelle, Loir-et-Cher

== See also ==
- Fontenelle (disambiguation)
- Guy Éder de La Fontenelle - infamous 16th century bandit in Brittany, France during the wars of the Holy League.
