= Grout curtain =

Barrier in construction

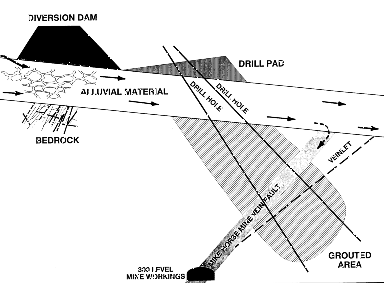
A schematic of a grout curtain, see drill holes and grouted area.

A grout curtain is a barrier that protects the foundation of a dam from seepage and can be made during initial construction or during repair. Additionally, it can be used to strengthen foundations and contain spills.

== Characteristics ==
A grout curtain usually consists of a row of vertically drilled holes filled with pressurized grout, a process commonly known as pressure grouting. The holes are drilled in intervals and in such a way that they cross each other, creating a curtain.

== Method ==
Grout is injected with grouting jets, which use a high-pressure fluid stream (i.e., slurry or water) to erode a cavity in the soil.

== See also ==
- Levee
- Dam failure
