= Fontenelle Reservoir =

Water storage on the Green River in Wyoming

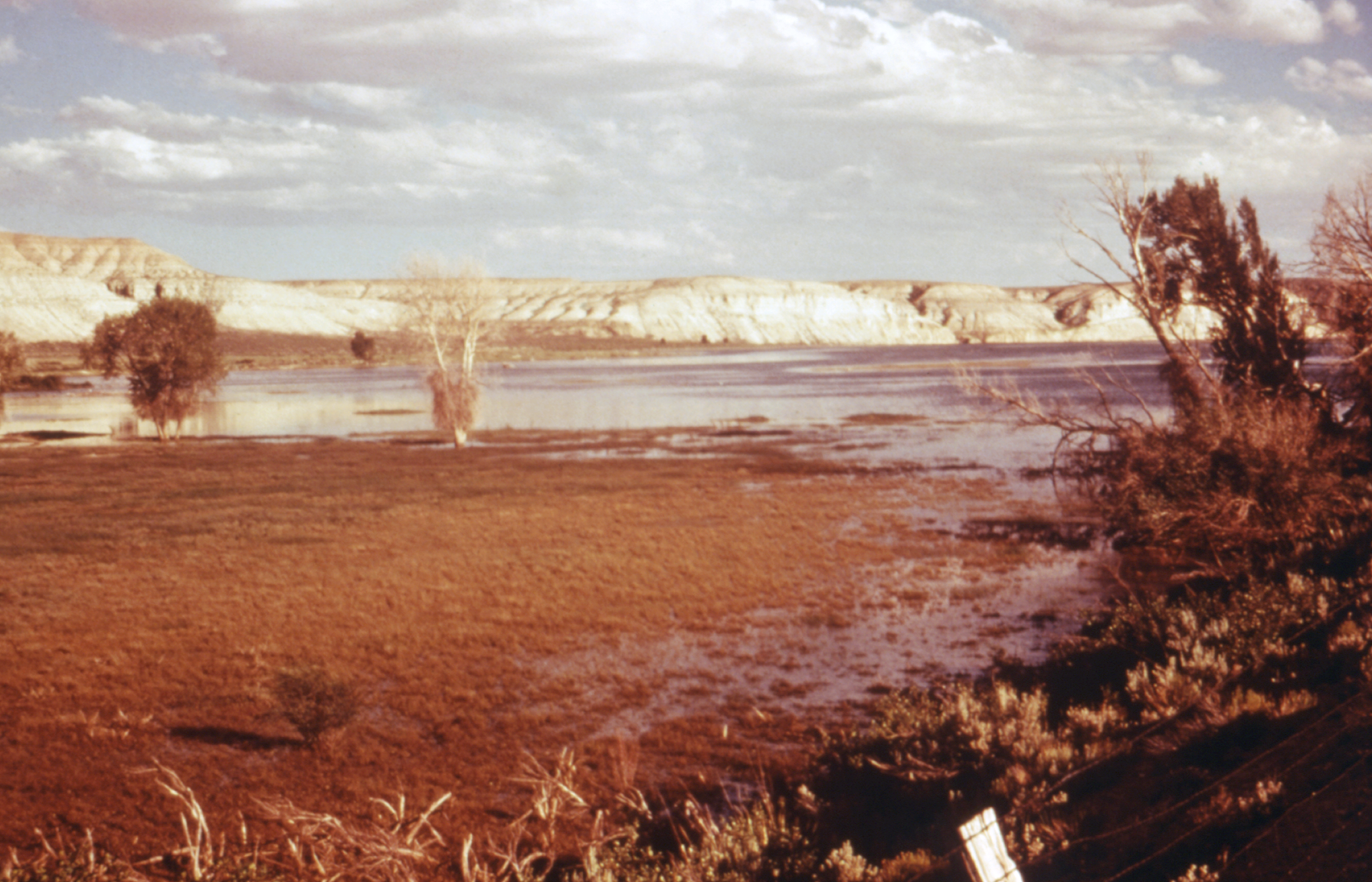
- Fontenelle Reservoir in 1972

- Location within Wyoming Location within the United States
- Location: Lincoln / Sweetwater counties, Wyoming, USA
- Coordinates: 42°02′00″N 110°04′00″W
- Type: reservoir
- Primary inflows: Green River
- Primary outflows: Green River
- Catchment area: 4,156 sq mi (10,760 km^{2})
- Basin countries: United States
- Max. length: 20 mi (32 km)
- Surface area: 8,000 acres (3,200 ha)
- Water volume: 345,360 acre⋅ft (0.42600 km^{3})
- Surface elevation: 6,509 ft (1,984 m)

Fontenelle Reservoir is an artificial reservoir located in southwest Wyoming. It lies almost entirely within Lincoln County, although the east end of the Fontenelle Dam and a tiny portion of the reservoir are actually in northwestern Sweetwater County. Impounded by Fontenelle Dam, the reservoir acts primarily as a storage reservoir for the U.S. Bureau of Reclamation's Colorado River Storage Project, retaining Wyoming water in the state as a means of asserting Wyoming's water rights, with a secondary purpose of power generation. Water from Fontenelle Reservoir is used in local industries such as mining and power generation. Although initially projected to provide irrigation water for agriculture, the irrigation component was downgraded after difficulties with efficient irrigation in Wyoming's high semi-desert became apparent.

Plagued by chronic leakage problems at the dam, the reservoir was hurriedly emptied in 1965 and 1986 amid concerns about dam failure. The reservoir has facilities for recreation, with boat launching ramps and campgrounds. Fishing is available for brown, cutthroat and rainbow trout.

The land used for the Fontenelle Reservoir and dam was previously the Stepp Ranch, owned by one of the few black ranching families in Wyoming in the 1960s. The Stepps fought for their land in court, but ultimately lost. The land had been in the Stepp family since the turn of the 20th century.

== See also ==
- List of largest reservoirs of Wyoming
- Black Pioneers, Images of the Black Experience on the North American Frontier
