= Teton Valley, Idaho =

Coordinates: 43°42′N 111°06′W

The Teton Valley
- Region
- Nickname: The Quiet Side of the Tetons
- Interactive map of The Teton Valley
- Country: United States
- State: Idaho, Wyoming
- Region: Teton
- Elevation: 6,200 ft (1,900 m)

Population (2000)
  - Total: 6,399
- Time zone: UTC-7 (Mountain (MST))
  - Summer (DST): UTC-6 (Mountain (MST))
- Area codes: 307, 208

Teton Valley is located on the west slope of the Teton Mountain Range in the western United States. Sometimes known as "The quiet side of the Tetons", it is composed of the cities of Victor, Idaho, Driggs, Idaho, Tetonia, Idaho, and Alta, Wyoming. The valley's economy is based in agriculture and ranching, with a shifting emphasis towards recreational tourism. Teton Valley has a unique climate and geology, as well as a wide variety of attractions including national parks and opportunities for wildlife viewing, fishing, hiking, horseback riding, skiing and participating in the arts.

== History ==
Teton Valley is marked by three cycles of volcanic activity that occurred in the last 2.1 million years. These eruptions made the valley a rich environment for plant and animal life.

The area was initially populated by the Shoshone-Bannock and Northern Paiute Indian tribes. Lewis and Clark travelled across the area in 1805.

Teton Valley was also the site of the annual Rocky Mountain Fur Rendezvous in 1829 and 1832. At the Rendezvous, trappers from the Rockies would go to sell their furs and traders would come in to provide supplies. Indian tribes such as the Flathead and Nez Perce would also attend the rendezvous. In the summer of 1832, a battle was fought between the trappers, Flatheads and Nez Perce with the Blackfeet Indian Tribe near Victor, Idaho.

In 1834, Pierre-Jean De Smet held the first religious service in the West in Teton Valley.

Teton Valley is informally known as Pierre's Hole in honor of "le grand Pierre" Tivanitagon, a Hudson's Bay Company trader said to be of Iroquois descent, who was killed in a battle with Blackfoot Indians in 1827.

From 1841 to 1868, over 300,000 whites migrated over the South Pass, about 150 miles south of Teton Valley. The migrations were due to the California Gold Rush of 1849 and the movements of the Mormons to avoid religious persecution. The migrating groups took over lands that belonged to the Bannock, Nez Perce and Blackfeet. The Nez Perce tribe retreated towards Canada only to be captured short of the border.

The completion of the transcontinental railroad and the Homestead Act of 1862 brought many settlers into Teton Valley. Many of the present day inhabitants of Teton Valley are fifth generation descendants of the early settlers.

== Demographics ==
As of the census of 2000, there were 6399 people (Teton County and Alta, Wyoming combined), 2,219 households, and 1,464 families residing in Teton Valley. There were 2,813 housing units in Teton Valley. The racial makeup of the county was 91.81% White, 0.16% Black or African American, 0.52% Native American, 0.22% Asian, 0.22% Pacific Islander, 6.31% from other races, and 0.77% from two or more races. 11.03% of the population were Hispanic or Latino of any race.

There were 2,219 households, out of which 39.30% had children under the age of 18 living with them, 60.70% were married couples living together, 5.85% had a female householder with no husband present, and 29.30% were non-families. 21.10% of all households were made up of individuals, and 5.05% had someone living alone who was 65 years of age or older. The average household size was 2.86 and the average family size was 3.36.

In Teton Valley, the population was widely distributed with 31.80% under the age of 18, 8.10% from 18 to 24, 33.80% from 25 to 44, 18.90% from 45 to 64, and 7.50% who were 65 years of age or older. The median age was 36 years. For every 100 females there were 113.4 males. For every 100 females age 18 and over, there were 114.70 males.

The median income for a household in Teton Valley was $49,269, and the median income for a family was $51,883. Males had a median income of $35,374 versus $20,675 for females. The per capita income for Teton Valley was $29,229. About 10.6% of families and 14.90% of the population were below the poverty line, including 21.10% of those under age 18 and 7.90% of those age 65 or over.

== Climate ==
Teton Valley has an average annual precipitation at the 6,100 ft. level of 15.9 inches (2004). The average snowfall is 73.7 inches. In July, the highest average daily maximum temperature is 81.7 °F (27.6 °C). In January, the lowest average daily minimum temperature registers at 6.4 °F (−14.2 °C). The driest month is November and the wettest is June.

== Geology ==
Teton Valley is located within the Wyoming Overthrust Belt System. Teton Valley is a mountainous region brought about by uplifts, faults, fault blocks, alluvial deposits and erosion by streams to create steep narrow canyons.

Teton Valley has a wide variety of soils. The surface is primarily composed of coarse loams and soils weathered from igneous and sedimentary sources.

== Attractions ==
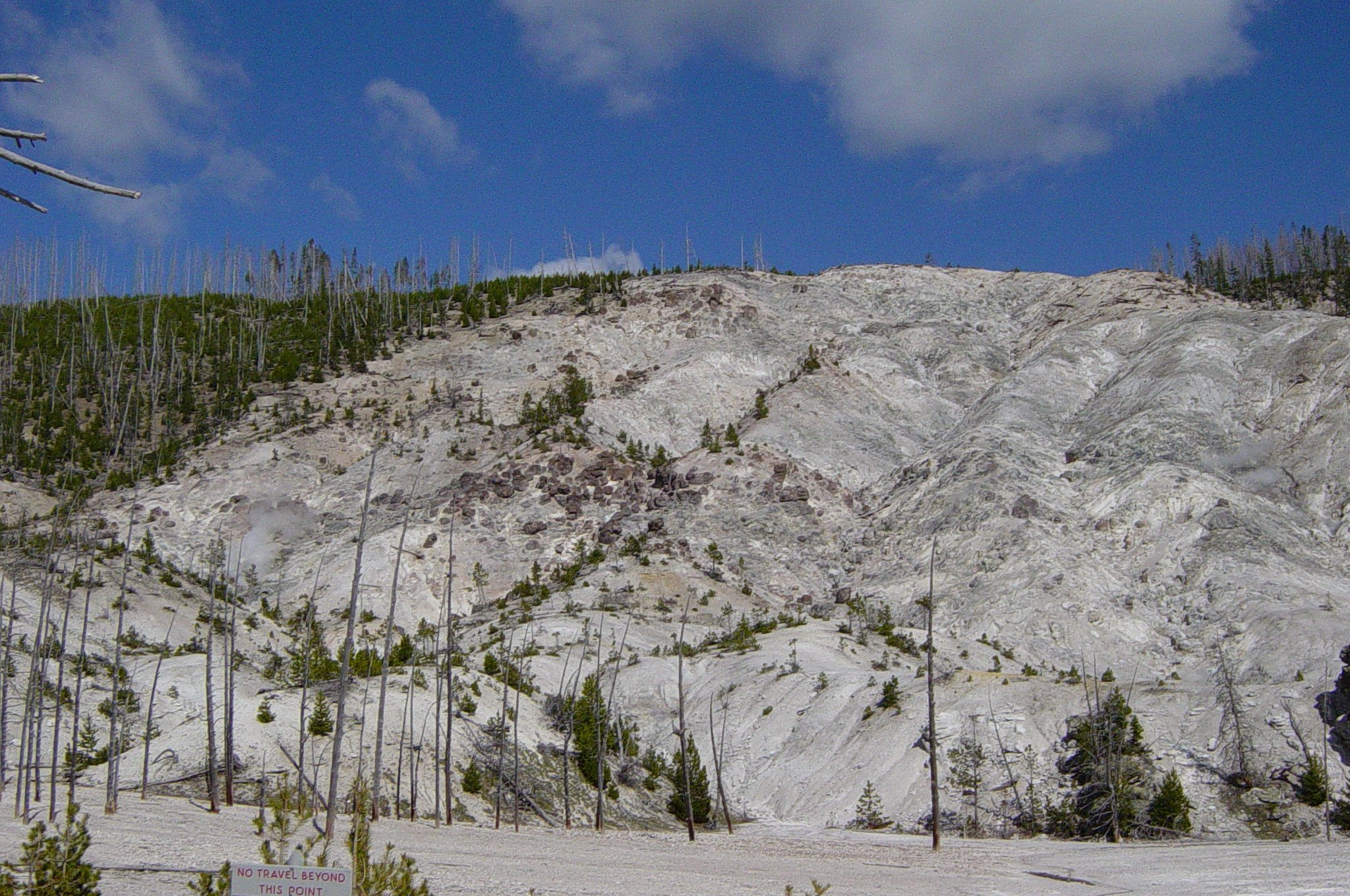
Mountain located in Yellowstone National Park.

National Parks:

Teton Valley is located near Yellowstone National Park and Grand Teton National Park.

Wildlife:

Teton Valley is the home of many different species of animals, including the bald eagle, black bears, cougars, wolverines, and grizzly bears.

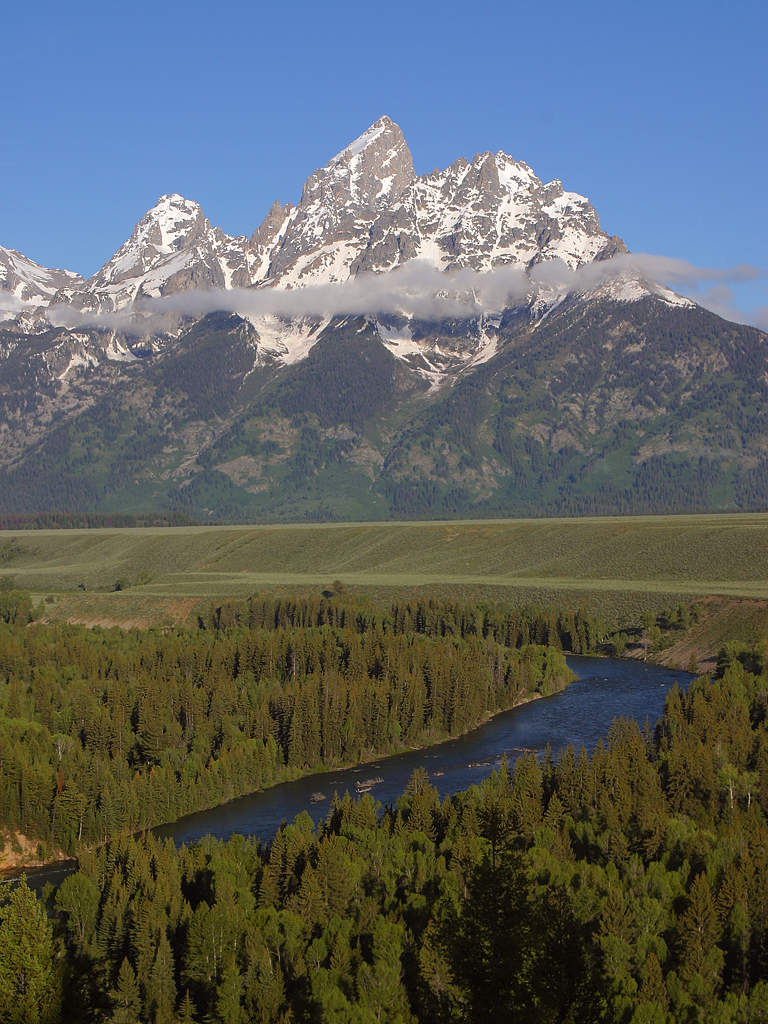
Upper Snake River passing by the Grand Tetons.

Fishing:

Teton Valley is located near the south fork of the Snake River, a common place to fish wild trout.

Palisades Lake is located near Teton Valley.

Hiking and Horseback Riding:

The Grand Teton Mountains provide many hiking and horseback riding opportunities, including into Grand Teton National Park. The Big Hole Mountains provide hiking to the west, as does the Snake River Range to the south. On the north side of the valley, there is access to Yellowstone's southwestern corner trails.

Skiing:

Grand Targhee offers a place for residents or visitors to ski during the winter months. Located in the Caribou-Targhee National Forest, the main gateway to Grand Teton and Yellowstone National Parks.

Arts:

Residing in Teton Valley are sculptors, glass blowers, landscape painters, musicians, actors, film makers, wood carvers and furniture makers. Teton Valley is the home of the Teton Valley Historical museum.

== Transportation ==
Vehicles:

Teton Valley has three main paved highways:

- State Highway 33 from Madison County to the Wyoming State Line
- State Highway 32 from Fremont County line south to its intersection with State Highway 33
- State Highway 31 from Victor City to Bonneville County line

Aviation:

Teton Valley has no regularly scheduled passenger carrying flights, however, the Driggs-Reed Memorial Airport, (IATA: DIJ, ICAO: KDIJ, FAA LID: DIJ) is located in Driggs, Idaho.
