= Amanda Otto =

U.S. musher and sled dog racer

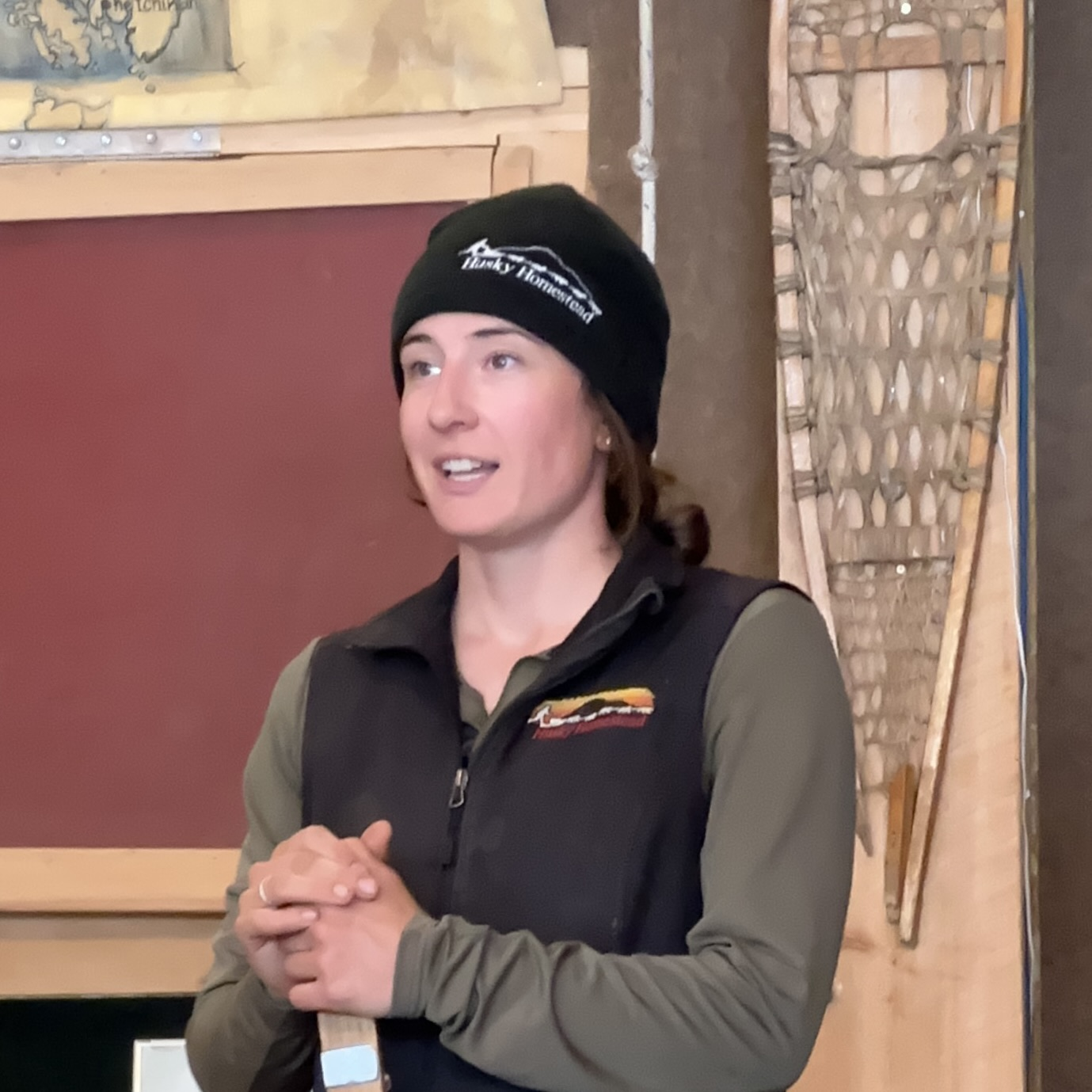
- Otto in 2023
- Born: 1994 or 1995 (age 30–31)

Amanda Otto is an American musher and sled dog racer. In 2022, she made her rookie run with a team of Alaskan huskies in the Iditarod, and in 2023, placed second in the Yukon Quest, where she was cited by race organizers and race veterinarians, in a rare unanimous decision, for exemplary treatment of her dogs.

== Early life and education ==
Otto grew up in Pocatello and Victor, Idaho. She is the granddaughter of Jim Otto, a member of the Pro Football Hall of Fame. At age 8 she had her first experience with mushing at the American Dog Derby. She participated in dog agility competitions.

Her family moved to Idaho's Teton Valley, where she graduated from Teton High School in 2012. She attended Biola University on a soccer scholarship, captaining the team her senior year and graduating in 2016 with a degree in journalism, and planned to play professionally until an injury ended her soccer career.

== Mushing career ==
After college, Otto moved to Alaska in 2016 to become a dog handler, eventually working for Jeff King at his Husky Homestead kennel, where, as of 2022, she was kennel manager. Under his mentorship, she raced in the Copper Basin 300, the Willow 300, and the Alpine 200 in 2021 to qualify for the Iditarod. She raced in the Iditarod for the first time in 2022, finishing 27th of 49 entries.

In 2023, Otto placed second in the Yukon Quest Alaska, finishing in 4 days, 11 hours, and 17 minutes. Her team was in such good condition at the end of the race, still yelping and pulling, that she was awarded the Vet's Choice Award for exemplary treatment of her dogs by the race organizers and veterinary team in the first unanimous decision in race history.

Otto competed in the 2024 Iditarod, leaving Anchorage on March 2, 2024, with her Husky Homestead team of 15 dogs. Except for one dog she borrowed from a friend for the race, all of the dogs on Otto's team were raised by her. On March 13, nine days, 18 hours, 24 minutes, and 33 seconds after the official start in Willow, Otto finished the race in eighth place with 12 dogs. Of the 29 mushers who finished, Otto was among four women who finished in the top 10, the most in Iditarod history. For her eighth-place finish, Otto took home $27,450 in winnings.
