= Spencer Nead =

American football player (born 1977)

No. 47
- Positions: Fullback, tight end

Personal information
- Born: November 3, 1977 (age 49); Tacoma, Washington, U.S.
- Listed height: 6 ft 4 in (1.93 m)
- Listed weight: 259 lb (117 kg)

Career information
- High school: Teton (Driggs, Idaho)
- College: BYU
- NFL draft: 2003: 7th round, 234th overall pick

Career history
- New England Patriots (2003)*; St. Louis Rams (2003); Atlanta Falcons (2004)*
- * Offseason or practice squad member only

Awards and highlights
- Second-team All-Mountain West (2002)

Career NFL statistics
- Receptions: 1
- Receiving yards: 6
- TDs: 0
- Stats at Pro Football Reference

Spencer Nead (born November 3, 1977) is an American former professional football player who was a fullback and tight end in the National Football League (NFL). He was selected by the New England Patriots in the seventh round of the 2003 NFL draft. He played college football for the BYU Cougars.

Nead was also a member of the St. Louis Rams and Atlanta Falcons.

== Early life ==
Nead played high school football at Teton High School in Driggs, Idaho. He earned all-state honors his junior and senior seasons at both wide receiver and linebacker. He was also named all-state in basketball his senior year, helping Teton High advance to the state championship.

== College career ==
Nead first played college football at Ricks College. He garnered first-team All-Western State Football League and junior college All-American recognition his sophomore year.

Nead then transferred to played for the BYU Cougars as a tight end. He started all 14 games in 2001, catching 22 receptions for 266 yards and five touchdowns, earning honorable mention All-Mountain West Conference honors. He totaled 40 receptions for 449 yards and one touchdown in 2002, garnering second-team All-Mountain West honors.

== Professional career ==
Pre-draft measurables
Height	Weight	Arm length	Hand span	40-yard dash	10-yard split	20-yard split	20-yard shuttle	Three-cone drill	Vertical jump	Broad jump	Bench press
6 ft 4 1/2 in (1.94 m)	259 lb (117 kg)	31 1/8 in (0.79 m)	9 1/2 in (0.24 m)	4.88 s	1.67 s	2.83 s	4.34 s	7.37 s	28.5 in (0.72 m)	8 ft 6 in (2.59 m)	19 reps
All values from NFL Combine

=== New England Patriots ===
Nead was selected by the New England Patriots in the seventh round, with the 234th overall pick, of the 2003 NFL draft. He officially signed with the team on July 21, 2003. He was waived by the Patriots on August 20, 2003.

=== St. Louis Rams ===
Nead signed with the St. Louis Rams on August 25, 2003. He was waived on September 15, signed to the team's practice squad on September 17, promoted to the active roster again on September 26, waived on September 30, signed to the practice squad again on October 2, promoted to the active roster on October 11, waived on December 9, and signed to the practice squad on December 11, 2003. Overall, Nead played in 10 games for the Rams during the 2003 season, catching one pass for six yards, fumbling once, returning two kicks for 27 yards, and recording seven solo tackles and one assisted tackle.

Neal signed a reserve/future contract with the Rams on January 16, 2004. He was waived on June 4, 2004.

=== Atlanta Falcons ===
Nead was signed by the Atlanta Falcons on June 14, 2004. He was waived by the Falcons on July 30, 2004.

== Personal life ==
His brother Kelley played tight end for the University of Idaho.
