= Teton River =

Teton River may refer to:

- Teton River (Montana), a tributary of the Missouri River in Montana, U.S.
- Teton River (Idaho), a tributary of the Snake River in Wyoming and Idaho, U.S.

== See also ==
- Tieton River
