= Canyon Creek (Teton River tributary) =

Stream in Idaho, U.S.

Coordinates: 43°55′01″N 111°27′46″W

Canyon Creek (middle right) joining with the Teton River

Canyon Creek is a stream in the U.S. state of Idaho. It is a tributary of the Teton River.

Canyon Creek was named for the deep canyon through which it flows.
