= Driggs–Reed Memorial Airport =

Airport in Idaho, United States

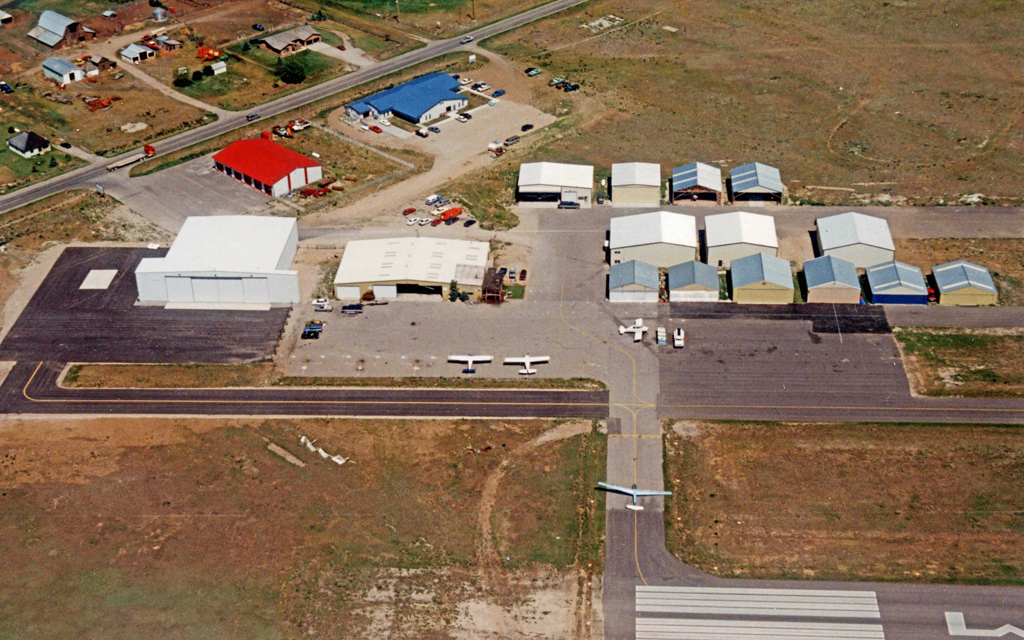
- Hangar complex in 1994
- IATA: none; ICAO: KDIJ; FAA LID: DIJ

Summary
- Airport type: Public
- Owner: City of Driggs
- Serves: Teton County, Idaho, U.S.
- Elevation AMSL: 6,229 ft (1,899 m)
- Coordinates: 43°44′33″N 111°05′51″W
- Website: driggsairport.org
- Interactive map of Driggs–Reed Memorial Airport

Runways
Direction	Length		Surface
Direction	ft	m	Surface
4/22	7,300	2,225	Asphalt

Statistics (2013)
- Aircraft operations: 8,000
- Based aircraft: 90
- Source: Federal Aviation Administration

Driggs–Reed Memorial Airport (ICAO: KDIJ, FAA LID: DIJ, formerly U59) is a city-owned public-use airport in the western United States, located at Driggs in Teton County, Idaho. This airport is included in the FAA's National Plan of Integrated Airport Systems for 2009–2013, which categorized it as a general aviation facility.

Although many U.S. airports use the same three-letter location identifier for the FAA and IATA, this facility is assigned DIJ by the FAA but has no designation from the IATA (which assigned DIJ to Dijon Airport in Dijon, France).

== Facilities and aircraft operations ==
Driggs–Reed Memorial Airport covers an area of 184 acres (0.74 km^{2}) at an elevation of 6,229 feet (1,899 m) above sea level. It has one runway designated 4/22 with an asphalt surface measuring 7,300 by 100 feet (2,225 by 30 m).

For the 12-month period ending July 8, 2013, the airport had 8,000 aircraft operations, an average of 22 per day: 86.3% general aviation and 13.7% air taxi. At that time there were 90 aircraft based at this airport: 69% single-engine, 6% multi-engine, 12% jet, 2% helicopter and 11% glider.

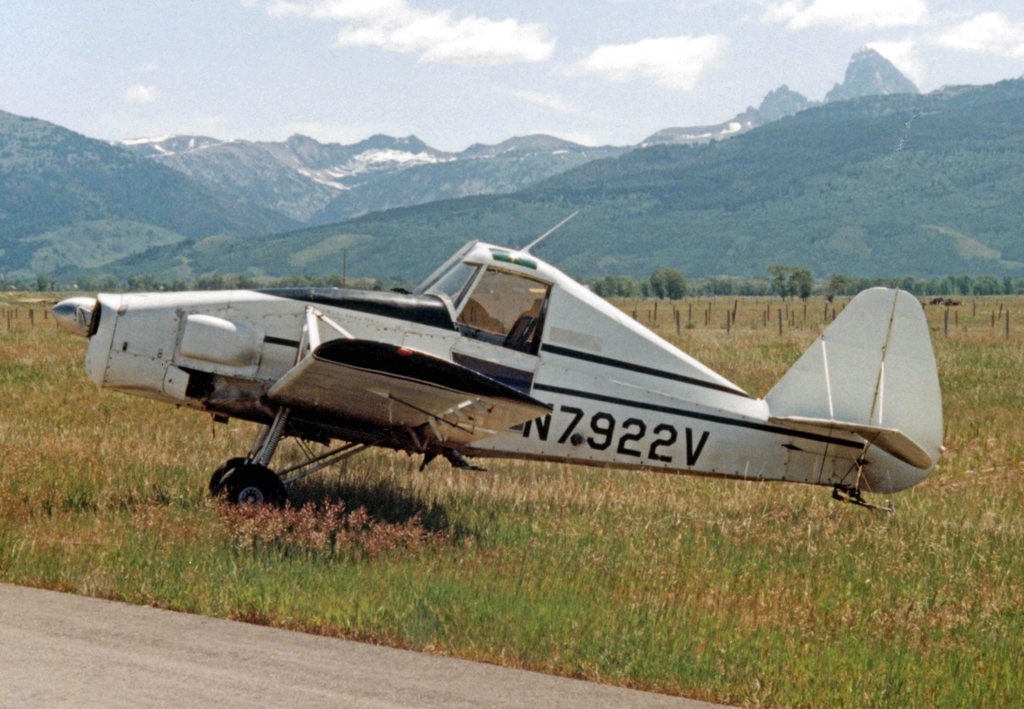
Utility aircraft at Driggs Airport showing surrounding topography.

== See also ==
- List of airports in Idaho
