= Bitch Creek =

- Location within Idaho Location within the United States

Location
- Country: United States
- State: Wyoming and Idaho
- Region: Fremont County, Idaho/Teton County, Idaho

Physical characteristics
- Source: Convergence of North Bitch Creek and South Bitch Creek
  - coordinates: 43°59′2.007″N 110°58′48.7308″W
- Mouth: Teton River (Idaho)
  - coordinates: 43°55′26.5722″N 111°17′20.1696″W

Bitch Creek is a stream in southeastern Idaho and western Wyoming in the United States. The creek begins at the merger of two forks, North Bitch Creek, and South Bitch Creek, in western Wyoming. Before crossing into Idaho, it is joined by Crater Creek and Jackpine Creek. It serves as the border between Fremont County and Teton County once entering Idaho. It empties into the Teton River northwest of Driggs. Excluding the forks, it is about 15 miles (24 km) long.

A previous alternate name for this waterway was North Fork Teton River.

The name is said to be a corruption of the French word "biche" (which means doe), and French trappers originally named the waterway "Anse de Biche."
