= Grand Targhee Resort =

Ski resort in Wyoming, United States

- Location in Wyoming Grand Targhee Resort (the United States)
- Location: Alta, Wyoming, U.S.
- Nearest city: Driggs, Idaho
- Coordinates: 43.789°N 110.957°W
- Vertical: 2,454 ft (748 m)
- Top elevation: 9,862 ft (3,006 m)
- Base elevation: 7,408 ft (2,258 m)
- Skiable area: 3,000 acres (12.1 km^{2}) (1,000 acres (4 km^{2}) reserved for cat skiing)
- Trails: 93
- Longest run: 2.7 miles (4.3 km)
- Lift system: 6 (1 surface): 2 High-Speed Quads; 1 High-Speed Six Pack; 2 Quads; 1 Magic carpet
- Terrain parks: 2
- Snowfall: 500 inches (1,270 cm)
- Snowmaking: 5%
- Night skiing: none
- Website: grandtarghee.com

Grand Targhee Resort is a ski resort in the western United States, located in western Wyoming in the Caribou-Targhee National Forest, near Alta, the closest town to the resort. It is 42 miles (68 km) northwest of Jackson and is accessible only from the west, through Driggs, Idaho. The border with Idaho is less than five miles (8 km) due west.

The resort has lodging, a spa, retail stores, and conference facilities. On the west side of the famous Teton Range, it is located eight miles (13 km) northwest of the Grand Teton, and the majority of the slopes at Grand Targhee face west.

== Activities ==
The ski resort has one high-speed six-pack, two high-speed quads, two fixed-grip quads, and one magic carpet. Its base is located at 7,851 feet (2,393 m), with its vertical drop being 2,270 feet (690 m). Its 2,602 acres of terrain is rated 10% beginner, 70% intermediate, 15% advanced, and 5% expert. There are also Nordic skiing trails, snowshoeing, snowcat adventures, and other activities. The longest trail at the resort is Teton Vista Traverse at 2.7 miles (4.3 km).

It averages over 500 inches (41.7 ft; 12.7 m) of snowfall per season, which ranks it among the top five ski resorts in North America. It is located 670 miles (1,080 km) inland and the snow that falls is nearly always powder snow. The reason for the abundant snowfall is twofold. First, the area is on the west slope or "wet" side of the Teton Range, topped by Grand Teton at 13,775 feet (4,199 m) and, second, because there is a moisture channel through the Rocky Mountains formed by the Snake River Plain in Idaho that channels moisture from the Pacific Ocean to the west slope of the Tetons.

The resort has two terrain parks as of January 2016.

Summertime offers scenic chairlift rides, kids camps, music festivals, a bluegrass festival, and 70+ miles of cross-country and downhill bike trails. Grand Targhee is also in close proximity to Yellowstone National Park.

== History ==
The original inhabitants of this area were the Shoshone, Bannock, Blackfoot, and Crow tribes. The Teton Range was called the Tee-Win-At by the Shoshone Indians, meaning "high pinnacles".

By 1867, Chief Targhee was known as “the great head chief of all the Bannock people”. He led his people through a period in which they were forced from their traditional nomadic ways and into a life of hard labor and farming on the newly created Fort Hall Reservation. Chief Targhee was admired for his strong character and integrity, and was honored by Euro-Americans and Native Americans alike. He held the peace while his people suffered from starvation and abuse resulting from the actions of both the United States and Idaho Territorial governments. He was killed by members of the Crow tribe while hunting for food in the winter of 1871/72. Upon his death, the Bannock fractured into several bands bent on war with the Euro-Americans that eventually led to the demise of a significant proportion of the Bannock.

Grand Targhee Resort's name includes both a reference to Grand Teton Mountain and Chief Targhee. A national forest, a mountain pass, a creek, and a dog bear his name, as does the resort itself.

=== Ski resort ===
The locals of Teton Valley were instrumental in establishing Grand Targhee Resort. In 1966, Grand Targhee, Inc. was formed by east Idahoans. One of the goals of the 900+ members was to benefit the community and the economy of the region. The resort opened 57 years ago on December 26, 1969, with the Bannock and Shoshone lifts, Targhee Lodge, and day lodge. The resort was officially dedicated by Idaho Governor Don Samuelson six weeks later on February 2, 1970.

The Sioux Lodge opened in 1971 and the original Master Plan under the Special Use Permit called for eventually developing the resort to a 6,000 skiers per day lift capacity, 475 accommodation units, including buildings up to five stories and included plans for a trailer park, golf courses, and snowmobile trails over 1,200 acres (4.9 km^{2}). The original plan never materialized.

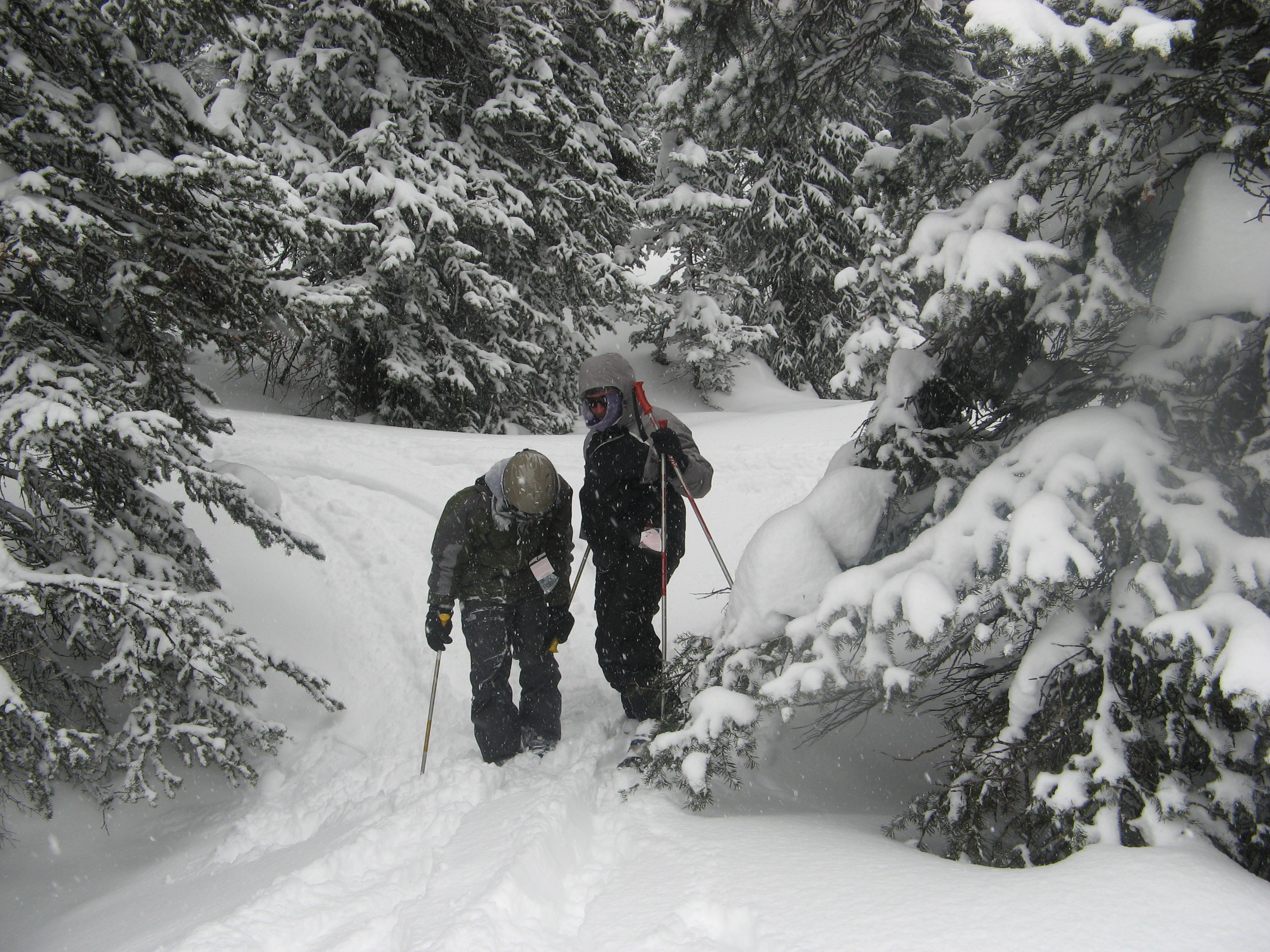
Deep powder among the trees on March 27, 2008

Prior to its fourth ski season, Grand Targhee was purchased in October 1973 by Bill Robinson, a plastics manufacturer from Cincinnati. Though primarily an absentee owner, Robinson and his family loved the area, bought a home in Driggs, and visited frequently throughout the years.

In 1987, Grand Targhee Resort was purchased and operated by Mory and Carol Bergmeyer. The Bergmeyers improved the resort facilities, added new guest activities and expanded the reputation of Targhee while continuing its dedication to family, quality and the sensitive balance between people and the great outdoors. In 1988, the Bergmeyers changed the resort's policy to allow snowboards on the hill. In March 1990, the Rendezvous day lodge was destroyed by fire.

Booth Creek Ski Holdings, Inc., a corporation run by CEO George Gillett, Jr., purchased Grand Targhee in March 1997. In June 2000, George and Rose Gillett, along with their four sons, purchased Grand Targhee from Booth Creek Ski Holdings.

In 1997, the resort's first high-speed detachable quad chair, Dreamcatcher, replaced Bannock, and the Shoshone double chair was replaced with a fixed-grip quad. Through a land exchange in 2004, the Gilletts acquired ownership of Grand Targhee's base area. Planning has begun for the future development of Grand Targhee Resort including an expansion of Peaked Mountain facilities and a proposed expanded base area with more lodging units. In the summer of 2016, the Blackfoot double chair was torn down to make way for the new Blackfoot highspeed quad chairlift.

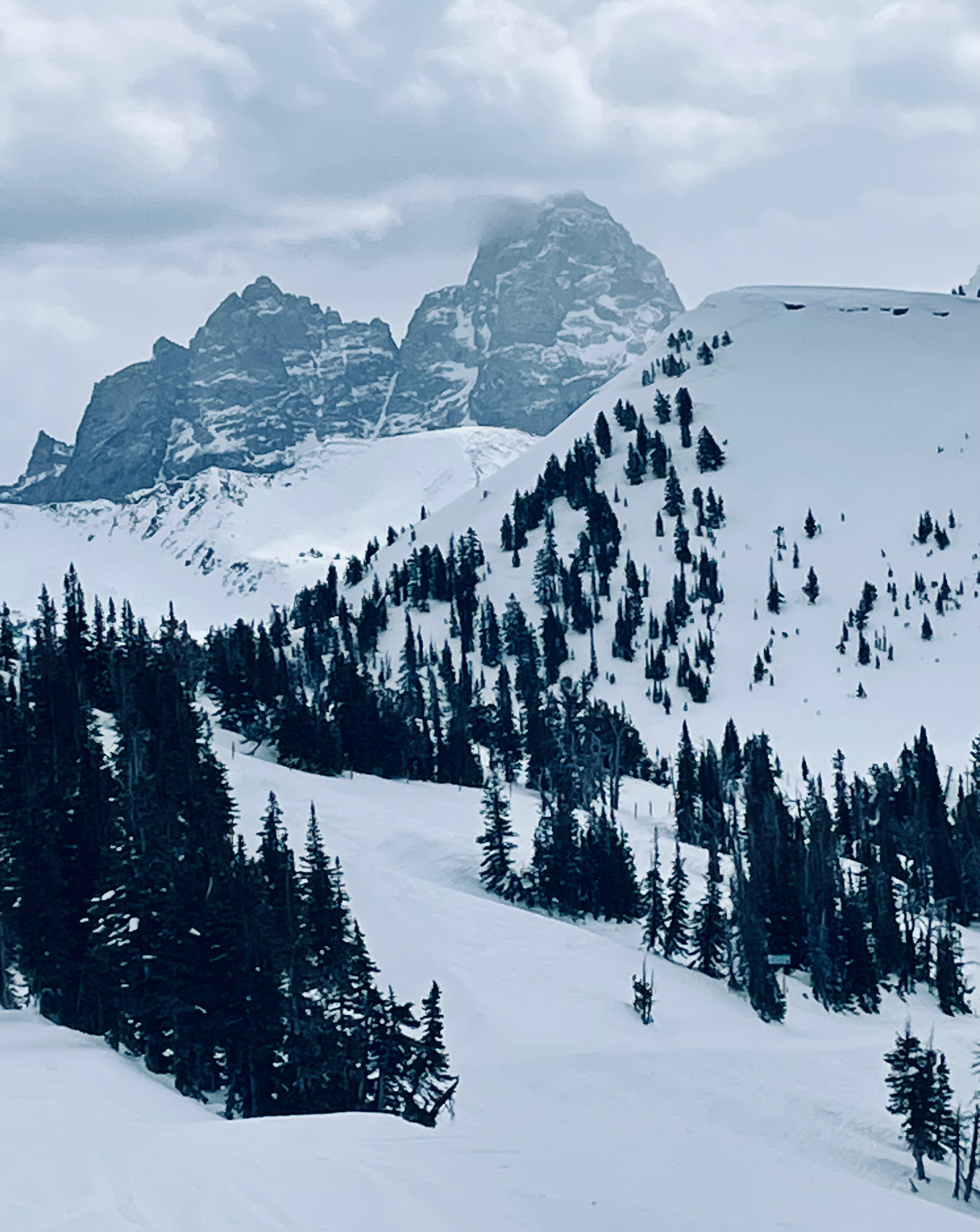
Grand Teton as seen from the slopes of Grand Targhee, March 2024.

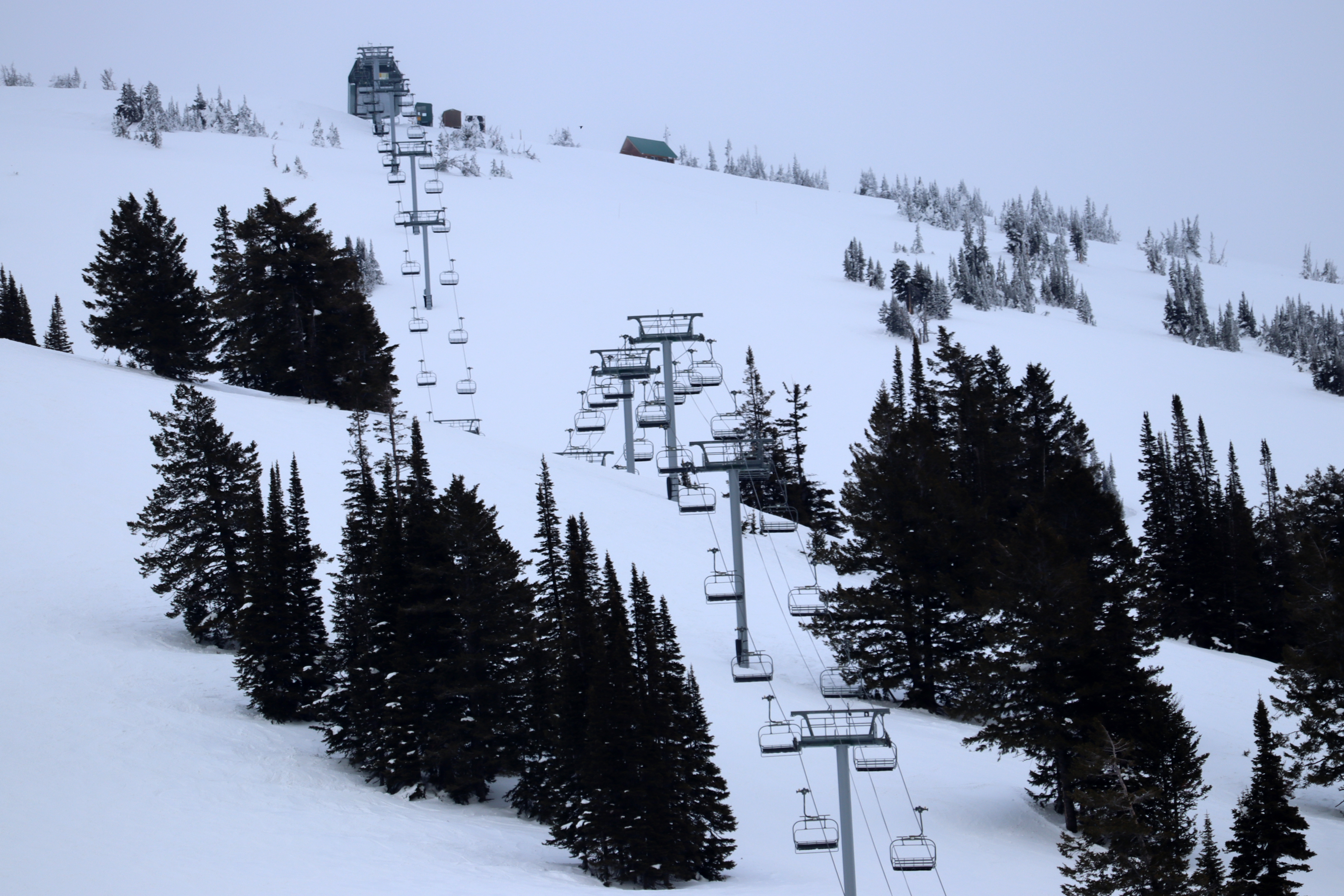
Dreamcatcher lift at Grand Targhee, March 2024

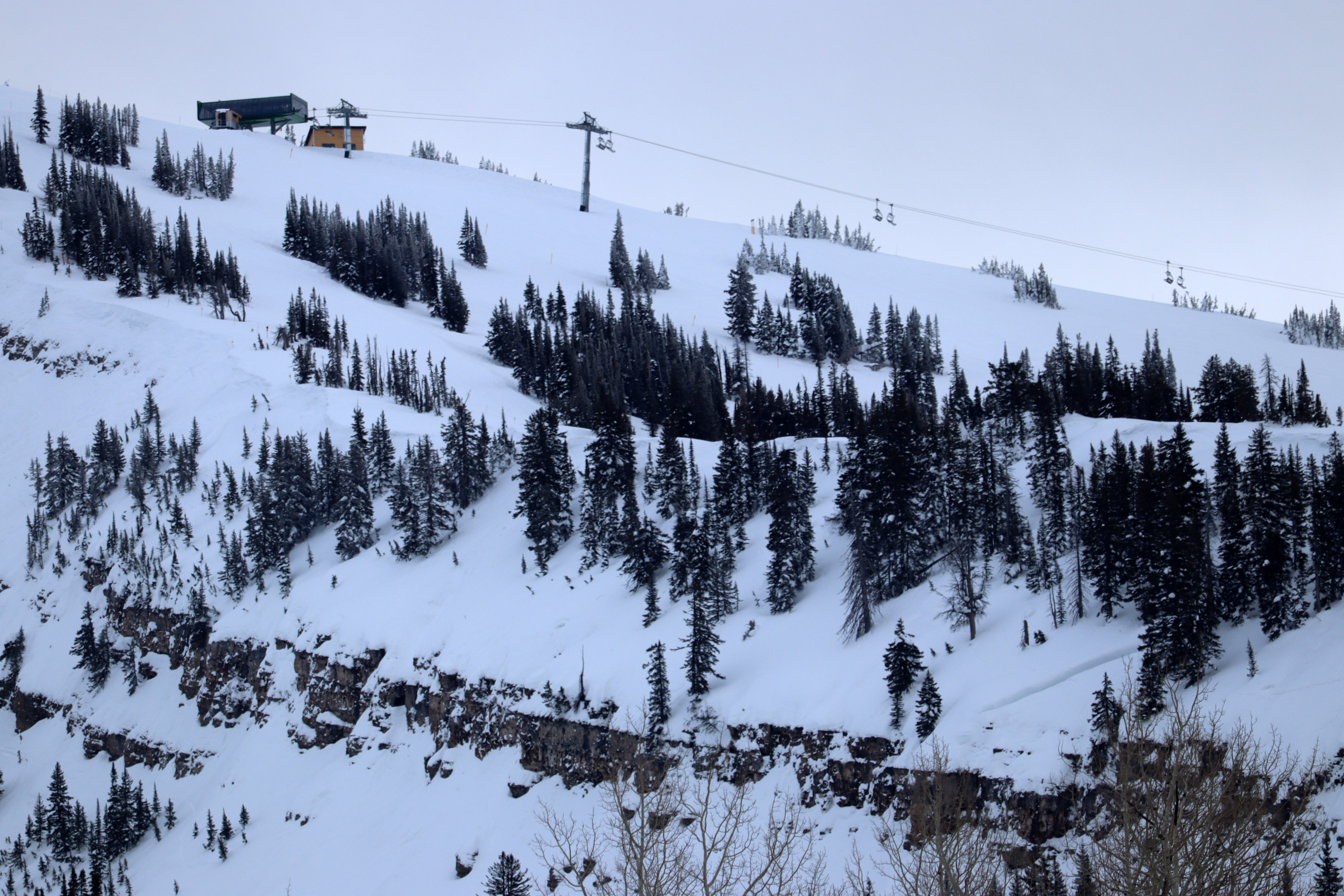
Colter lift at Grand Targhee, March 2024

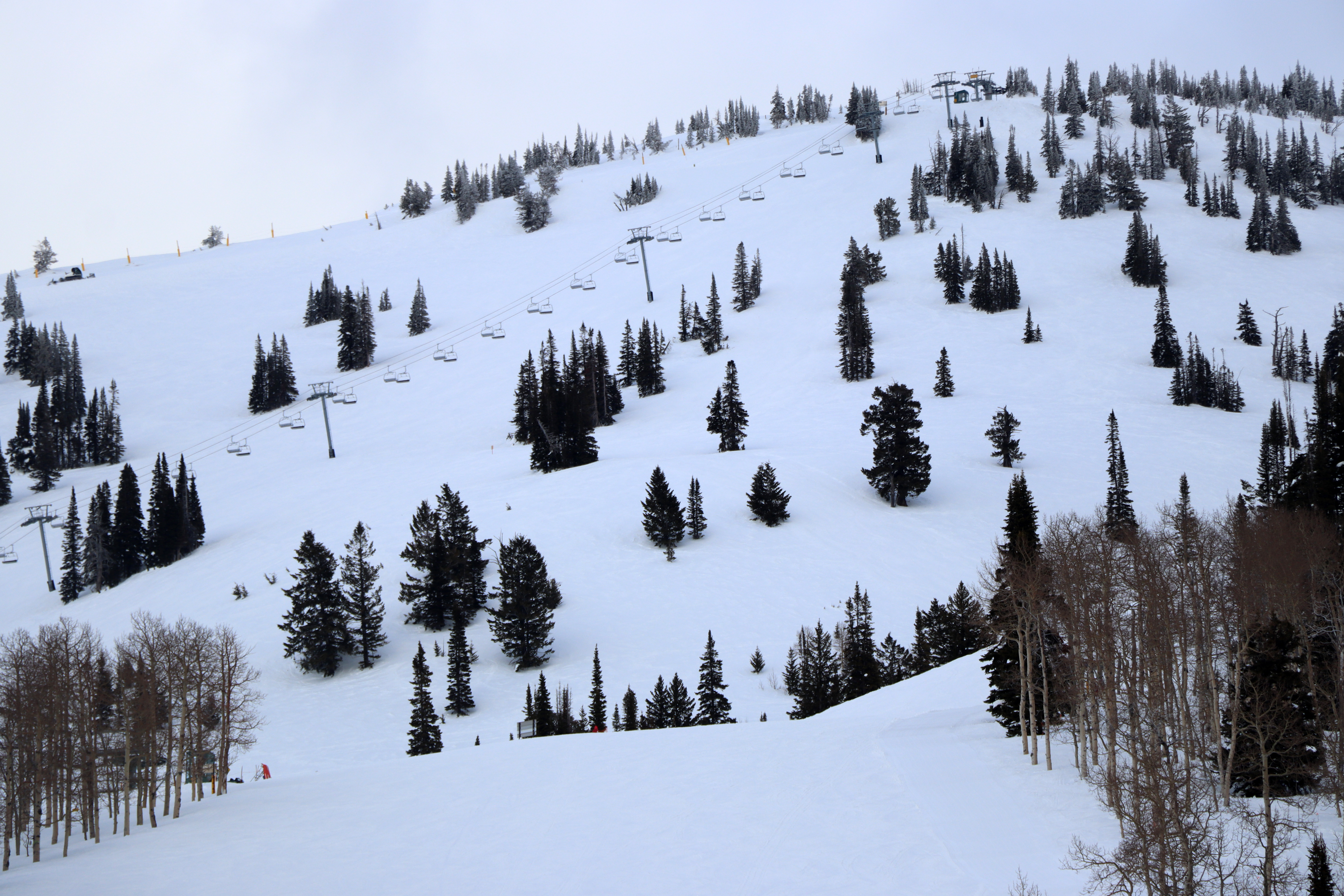
Blackfoot lift at Grand Targhee, March 2024

=== Stick of Truth ===
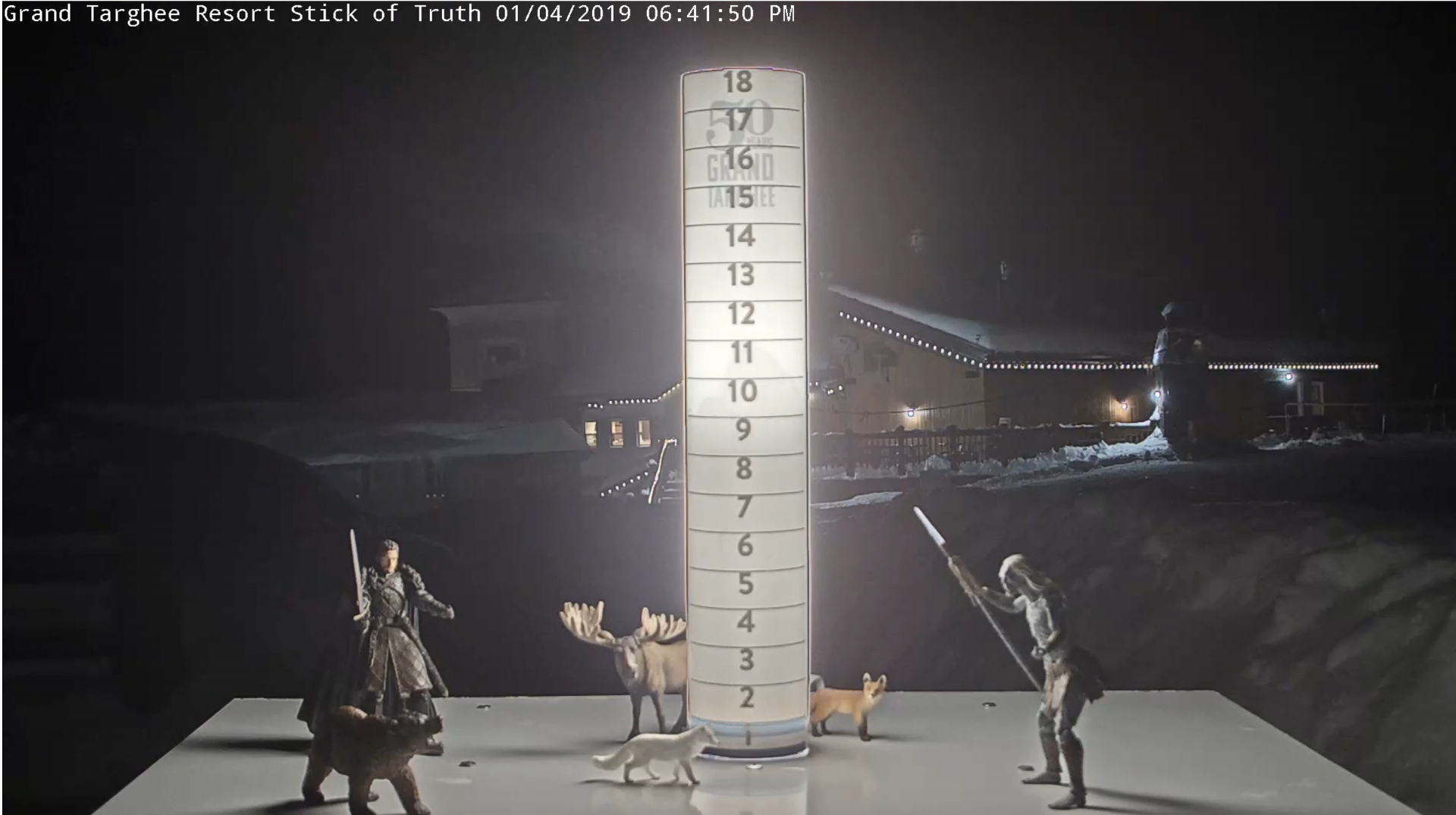
Stick of Truth at Grand Targhee Resort from webcam

The Stick of Truth is a snow depth indicator at the resort, first installed in November 2018.

Unlike snow condition data from SNOTEL, the Truth gauge is simple and non-electronic—except for night lighting. It consists of a 18-inch (46 cm) measuring stick (calibrated in inches) on a platform to accumulate snowfall, and a webcam. The platform is cleared of snow and ice daily so that the gauge shows snow depth delivered in the last (up to) 24 hours.

Since its inception, the platform often has few whimsical plastic figurines from a collection of hundreds.

The webcam shows a live view and is available on the resort's Snow Report page, the See Jackson Hole website, as well as on YouTube.

== Climate ==
Climate data for Grand Targhee, Wyoming, 2007–2020 normals: 9260ft (2822m)
Month	Jan	Feb	Mar	Apr	May	Jun	Jul	Aug	Sep	Oct	Nov	Dec	Year
Record high °F (°C)	55 (13)	50 (10)	53 (12)	64 (18)	69 (21)	76 (24)	82 (28)	77 (25)	73 (23)	65 (18)	54 (12)	46 (8)	82 (28)
Mean maximum °F (°C)	41.6 (5.3)	40.9 (4.9)	45.9 (7.7)	55.8 (13.2)	63.6 (17.6)	70.0 (21.1)	73.6 (23.1)	72.9 (22.7)	67.9 (19.9)	57.1 (13.9)	48.2 (9.0)	38.9 (3.8)	74.2 (23.4)
Mean daily maximum °F (°C)	26.7 (−2.9)	26.6 (−3.0)	33.3 (0.7)	39.5 (4.2)	49.5 (9.7)	56.8 (13.8)	65.6 (18.7)	64.0 (17.8)	55.8 (13.2)	41.5 (5.3)	32.1 (0.1)	23.8 (−4.6)	42.9 (6.1)
Daily mean °F (°C)	19.7 (−6.8)	19.7 (−6.8)	25.9 (−3.4)	31.1 (−0.5)	40.6 (4.8)	48.5 (9.2)	57.7 (14.3)	56.3 (13.5)	48.5 (9.2)	35.0 (1.7)	25.7 (−3.5)	17.5 (−8.1)	35.5 (2.0)
Mean daily minimum °F (°C)	12.7 (−10.7)	12.8 (−10.7)	18.5 (−7.5)	22.6 (−5.2)	31.8 (−0.1)	40.3 (4.6)	49.8 (9.9)	48.5 (9.2)	41.2 (5.1)	28.6 (−1.9)	19.3 (−7.1)	11.2 (−11.6)	28.1 (−2.2)
Mean minimum °F (°C)	−7.1 (−21.7)	−3.6 (−19.8)	1.9 (−16.7)	7.3 (−13.7)	16.4 (−8.7)	27.1 (−2.7)	39.6 (4.2)	37.1 (2.8)	26.1 (−3.3)	12.5 (−10.8)	1.1 (−17.2)	−8.0 (−22.2)	−10.9 (−23.8)
Record low °F (°C)	−19 (−28)	−15 (−26)	−5 (−21)	−3 (−19)	9 (−13)	22 (−6)	30 (−1)	29 (−2)	20 (−7)	−1 (−18)	−15 (−26)	−21 (−29)	−21 (−29)
Average precipitation inches (mm)	6.53 (166)	4.08 (104)	4.60 (117)	5.50 (140)	4.53 (115)	3.33 (85)	1.13 (29)	1.75 (44)	3.18 (81)	4.67 (119)	5.28 (134)	5.15 (131)	49.73 (1,265)
Source 1: XMACIS2
Source 2: NOAA (Precipitation)
