= Antoine Godin =

Antoine Godin (c. 1805–1836), was "an Iroquois half-breed" Canadian fur trapper and explorer, is noted primarily for the public murder of a Gros Ventre chief which led to a battle between fur traders and Indians in Pierre's Hole, now called the Teton Basin, in eastern Idaho.

Initially employed by the British Northwest Fur Company, Godin and his father Thyery were among the Iroquois Indians hired because of skills as trappers, hunters and boatmen. From the Montreal area, Godin and his father may have been among forty mostly Iroquois recruits that Joseph LaRocque, of the Northwest Fur Company, brought from Canada to the Rocky Mountains and the Northwest in 1817. In 1821 the Northwest Fur Company and their employees merged with the Hudson's Bay Company.

Antoine Godin was probably born prior to 1810, as he is mentioned in the 1825 journal of Hudson's Bay officer Peter Skene Ogden in the northern Rocky Mountains. At this time, Thyery Godin had already left his British employer to join American fur trappers at the urging of Johnson Gardner, an associate of William H. Ashley. The Americans promised those who defected from the British higher prices for their furs as well as lower charges for goods and supplies. This campaign resulted in twenty-three Iroquois and Canadian freeman, and their fur caches, joining the Americans. Instead of simply deserting, Antoine Godin met with Ogden to request a release from his obligation to the Hudson's Bay Company. Ogden wrote ...being a worthless scamp, I gave him his liberty...

In either 1828 or 1830, Godin's father was slain by Blackfoot Indians, leaving Antoine with a vindictive hatred for all Blackfeet and their allies.

While traveling to the 1832 rendezvous at Pierre's Hole, Godin and his party came across trapper Thomas Fitzpatrick, emaciated with his feet bare, and his clothing in shreds, traveling without horse or equipment. Fitzpatrick had been attacked and robbed several weeks earlier by Blackfeet when he had ridden ahead of a pack train to alert the rendezvous of their eminent arrival. Godin brought Fitzpatrick in to the rendezvous at a time when many had given Fitzpatrick up for dead.

By 1834 an entry in one of Fort Hall, Idaho's account books indicates that Godin was employed by Nathaniel Wyeth. The note stated that Godin was not reliable, and should have only limited credit. Other entries in the account book show that Godin was a meat hunter for the fort from 1834 to mid-1836.

On May 22, 1836, Godin was invited to trade for furs by a Metis man named James Bird, but was shot without warning by one of Bird's Blackfoot companions prior to trading. Although unable to save Godin, men from the fort were able to retrieve his personal effects. Godin's blanket, rifle, and other goods were shown as credits towards his account in the fort's ledger on May 23, 1836.

== Battle at Pierre's Hole ==
At the close of the 1832 rendezvous, Godin joined a brigade led by Milton Sublette. The group of over forty men included Nathaniel Wyeth and eleven of his men. On the morning of the second day after leaving rendezvous, a large group with pack animals were observed approaching the camp. Initially there was no alarm, for this group was assumed to be an American Fur Company supply train led by Lucien Fontenelle, which had failed to arrive in time for the rendezvous. As the group came closer, it became apparent they were a party of between 150 and 200 Gros Ventre Indians, including women and children, who were moving the location of their village. Because they were in transit with their families, this group was not seeking a fight with the mountain men. Signs were made for peace, and one of the chiefs rode forward, as did Antoine Godin and Baptiste Dorian, a Flathead "breed". According to The Adventures of Captain Bonneville, written by Washington Irving, Godin apparently saw this as a chance to avenge the death of his father. Coming even with the chief, Godin grasped the man's rifle and called to Dorian to shoot the chief, which Dorian did. The two then stole the chief's bright red blanket and raced back to the trapper brigade. (Bonneville, "Chapter 6") This murder initiated the "Battle of Pierre's Hole", which resulted in deaths and injuries to both sides.
