= Alta, Wyoming =

- CDP
- Location of Alta, Wyoming
- Coordinates: 43°45′14″N 111°00′13″W
- Country: United States
- State: Wyoming
- County: Teton

Area
  - Total: 8.3 sq mi (21 km^{2})
  - Land: 8.3 sq mi (21 km^{2})
  - Water: 0.0 sq mi (0 km^{2})
- Elevation: 6,440 ft (1,960 m)

Population (2020)
  - Total: 429
  - Density: 52/sq mi (20/km^{2})
- Time zone: UTC-7 (Mountain (MST))
  - Summer (DST): UTC-6 (MDT)
- ZIP code: 83414
- Area code: 307
- FIPS code: 56-01985
- GNIS feature ID: 1597199

Alta is a census-designated place (CDP) in Teton County, Wyoming, United States. The population was 429 at the 2020 census. It is part of the Jackson, WY–ID Micropolitan Statistical Area, and it is located between Driggs, Idaho and the Grand Targhee ski resort.

== Geography ==
Alta is located just east of the Idaho state line, approximately 5 miles (8 km) east of Driggs, at an elevation of 6,440 feet (1,963 m) above sea level.

According to the United States Census Bureau, the CDP has a total area of 8.3 square miles (21 km^{2}), all land.

== Climate ==
According to the Köppen Climate Classification system, Alta has a warm-summer humid continental climate, abbreviated "Dfb" on climate maps. The hottest temperature recorded in Alta was 98 °F (37 °C) on July 12, 2026, while the coldest temperature recorded was −46 °F (−43 °C) on February 9, 1933.

Climate data for Alta, Wyoming, 1991–2020 normals, extremes 1909–present
Month	Jan	Feb	Mar	Apr	May	Jun	Jul	Aug	Sep	Oct	Nov	Dec	Year
Record high °F (°C)	58 (14)	60 (16)	69 (21)	79 (26)	87 (31)	92 (33)	98 (37)	95 (35)	90 (32)	81 (27)	69 (21)	64 (18)	98 (37)
Mean maximum °F (°C)	43.1 (6.2)	45.5 (7.5)	54.2 (12.3)	65.5 (18.6)	76.6 (24.8)	83.8 (28.8)	87.7 (30.9)	87.3 (30.7)	82.7 (28.2)	71.7 (22.1)	57.0 (13.9)	44.9 (7.2)	89.0 (31.7)
Mean daily maximum °F (°C)	29.0 (−1.7)	32.0 (0.0)	40.0 (4.4)	48.1 (8.9)	60.1 (15.6)	69.1 (20.6)	78.8 (26.0)	78.2 (25.7)	68.5 (20.3)	53.3 (11.8)	38.5 (3.6)	28.3 (−2.1)	52.0 (11.1)
Daily mean °F (°C)	20.4 (−6.4)	22.7 (−5.2)	30.4 (−0.9)	37.7 (3.2)	47.8 (8.8)	55.7 (13.2)	63.7 (17.6)	62.7 (17.1)	54.1 (12.3)	41.8 (5.4)	29.2 (−1.6)	20.0 (−6.7)	40.5 (4.7)
Mean daily minimum °F (°C)	11.8 (−11.2)	13.5 (−10.3)	20.8 (−6.2)	27.3 (−2.6)	35.5 (1.9)	42.3 (5.7)	48.5 (9.2)	47.2 (8.4)	39.7 (4.3)	30.2 (−1.0)	19.8 (−6.8)	11.7 (−11.3)	29.0 (−1.7)
Mean minimum °F (°C)	−9.1 (−22.8)	−5.9 (−21.1)	2.4 (−16.4)	12.5 (−10.8)	21.9 (−5.6)	29.7 (−1.3)	37.5 (3.1)	35.4 (1.9)	25.5 (−3.6)	13.4 (−10.3)	−1.1 (−18.4)	−8.7 (−22.6)	−15.0 (−26.1)
Record low °F (°C)	−42 (−41)	−46 (−43)	−24 (−31)	−15 (−26)	8 (−13)	20 (−7)	26 (−3)	10 (−12)	6 (−14)	−13 (−25)	−32 (−36)	−42 (−41)	−46 (−43)
Average precipitation inches (mm)	2.49 (63)	1.84 (47)	2.10 (53)	2.49 (63)	3.01 (76)	2.31 (59)	1.38 (35)	1.38 (35)	1.85 (47)	2.06 (52)	1.93 (49)	2.14 (54)	24.98 (633)
Average snowfall inches (cm)	21.7 (55)	16.2 (41)	15.3 (39)	13.5 (34)	2.5 (6.4)	0.3 (0.76)	0.0 (0.0)	0.0 (0.0)	0.5 (1.3)	5.9 (15)	15.8 (40)	21.7 (55)	113.4 (287.46)
Average precipitation days (≥ 0.01 in)	9.3	7.8	8.7	9.2	9.9	8.0	5.1	6.0	6.2	6.9	7.9	8.6	93.6
Average snowy days (≥ 0.1 in)	7.5	6.1	5.5	4.2	1.2	0.2	0.0	0.0	0.1	1.9	4.9	6.8	38.4
Source 1: NOAA
Source 2: National Weather Service

== Demographics ==
As of the census of 2000, there were 400 people, 141 households, and 104 families residing in the CDP. The population density was 3.1 inhabitants per square mile (1.2/km^{2}). There were 181 housing units at an average density of 1.4 per square mile (0.54/km^{2}). The racial makeup of the CDP was 99.25% White and 0.75% Asian. Hispanic or Latino of any race were 0.25% of the population.

There were 141 households, out of which 34.0% had children under the age of 18 living with them, 65.2% were married couples living together, 7.1% had a female householder with no husband present, and 26.2% were non-families. 18.4% of all households were made up of individuals, and 1.4% had someone living alone who was 65 years of age or older. The average household size was 2.84 and the average family size was 3.28.

In the CDP, the population was spread out, with 28.5% under the age of 18, 7.8% from 18 to 24, 22.0% from 25 to 44, 31.0% from 45 to 64, and 10.8% who were 65 years of age or older. The median age was 41 years. For every 100 females, there were 126.0 males. For every 100 females age 18 and over, there were 118.3 males.

The median income for a household in the CDP was $56,750, and the median income for a family was $57,917. Males had a median income of $38,438 versus $19,107 for females. The per capita income for the CDP was $40,680. About 11.4% of families and 16.8% of the population were below the poverty line, including 24.0% of those under age 18 and none of those age 65 or over.

== Education ==
Public education in Alta is provided by Teton County School District #1 at Alta Elementary School (grades K–5). Students in grades six through twelve have the option to attend either the secondary schools in nearby Driggs (Teton School District #401), at Teton High School (9–12) and Teton Middle School (6-8 for Alta residents), or to attend the secondary schools in Jackson, Wyoming, about 40 miles (64 km) away and over 8,431-foot (2,570 m) Teton Pass.

Alta has a public library, a branch of the Teton County Library system.

== Notable residents ==
- Leland Christensen (1959-2022), politician, was born in Alta.
- Jaelin Kauf (b. 1996), Olympic freestyle skier, claims Alta as her home town.
