= Pierre's Hole =

Coordinates: 43.71°N 111.11°W

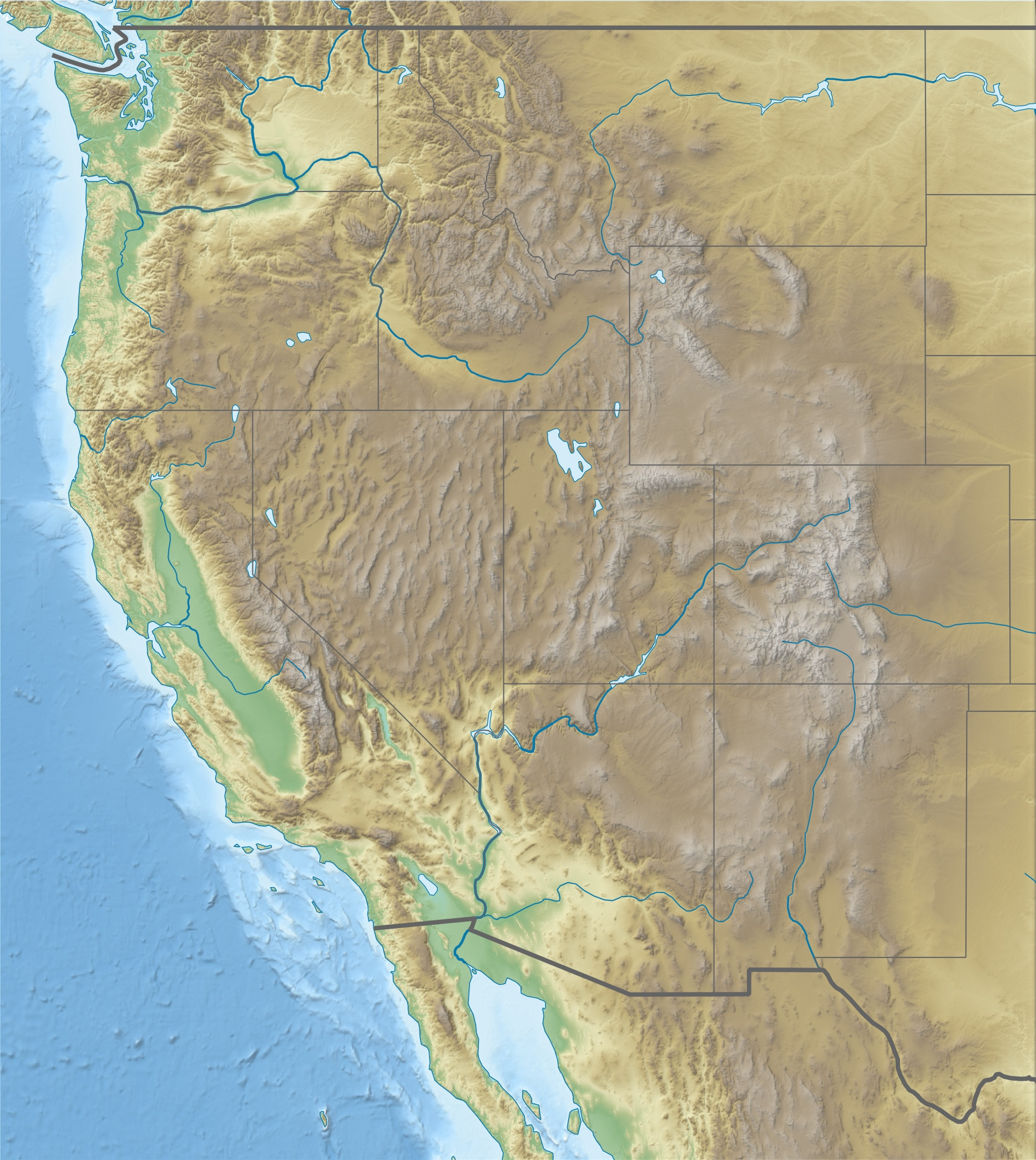
Location in the western United States
Location in Idaho

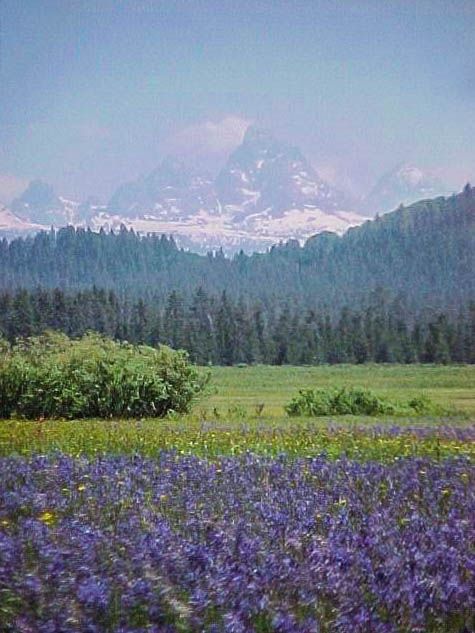
Teton Range from the west, Teton Basin, Idaho

Pierre's Hole is a shallow valley in the western United States in eastern Idaho, just west of the Teton Range in neighboring Wyoming. With an elevation over 6,000 feet (1,830 m) above sea level, it collects the headwaters of the Teton River, and was a strategic center of the fur trade of the northern Rocky Mountains. The nearby Jackson's Hole area in Wyoming is on the opposite side of the Tetons.

Traversed by state highway 33, the valley in Teton County is now known as Teton Basin or Teton Valley. In 1984, it was designated a historic place as the site of the infamous events in the Battle of Pierre's Hole (below), following the well-attended Rendezvous in July 1832.

== Historical overview ==
Explorer and mountain man John Colter, a member of the earlier Lewis and Clark Expedition, asserted that he passed through the valley in 1808. The Teton River flows northward through the mountain meadows of Pierre's Hole and then conjoins Bitch Creek (once known as the North Fork of the Teton) just before it turns west and into Teton Canyon. To mountain men, a large low-lying valley, such as this, with abundant beaver and game was called a "hole". Mountain men preferred these areas of numerous beaver rich streams as they provided ample food and comfortable camping in addition to beaver pelts. Pierre's Hole was named in honor of "le grand Pierre" Tivanitagon, a Hudson's Bay Company trader said to be of Iroquois descent, who was killed in a battle with Blackfoot Indians in 1827.

Pierre's Hole was the site of the huge Rendezvous of 1832. Hundreds of mountain men, trappers, Indians and fur company traders met to sell furs or trade for supplies. At the end of the 1832 rendezvous, an intense battle ensued between a group of Gros Ventre and the party of American trappers aided by their Nez Perce and Flathead allies.

After the fur trade subsided in the 1840s, Teton Basin returned to a quiet summer hunting valley for Native Americans. An Englishman named Richard "Beaver Dick" Leigh came to the Teton region sometime around 1860, and frequently trapped and hunted in Teton Basin and wintered on the lower Teton River near its confluence with the Henry's Fork of the Snake some miles below the basin. Beaver Dick guided F. V. Hayden and his geological survey through the Teton and Yellowstone region in 1872. He guided the Stevenson party in exploration of Teton Basin and the first ascent of the Grand Teton and guided the entire Hayden Expedition in Yellowstone and in Jackson Hole. In honor of his service, Leigh Lake in Grand Teton National Park is named after Richard Leigh and Jenny Lake is named after his Indian wife. Teton Basin, was later settled by Mormon farmers, who used the fertile but elevated valley to graze cattle and raise hay and other feed.

== Rendezvous at Pierre's Hole ==
The 1832 'rendezvous at Pierre's Hole', or 'Rendezvous of 1832' was one of the largest rendezvous held in the Rocky Mountains. The meeting was held at the west foot of the Three Tetons in Teton County, Idaho. The basin was accessed from a trail that reached the Snake River from Green River. The trail then branched off towards Pierre's Hole through a gap between the Big Hole Mountains and the Palisades range.

Indian and mountain man camps extended from Teton Creek on the south end of present-day Driggs, north along the west side of the Teton Mountains to Tetonia. The camps covered an area of seven square miles, or more. It is estimated there were four hundred mountain men, one hundred and eight lodges of Nez Perce, eighty lodges of Flatheads, and over three thousand horses.

=== Purpose of a rendezvous ===
A mountain man rendezvous was a yearly event held in the summer for American fur trappers to gather together, sell their furs, and resupply themselves for another season of trapping. Representatives of eastern fur-trading companies would arrive with pack mules loaded with trade goods to meet the needs of the trappers for the upcoming year. If trappers were employed by a particular company, they turned their furs, mainly beaver, over to the company representative and received their pay, less the amount used to cover what they would need for another trapping season. Profits could purchase additional goods, including whiskey, tobacco, and other luxury items. Free trappers, i.e. men not contracted with a company, could negotiate a purchase price for their accumulated furs.

In general, trappers and merchants settled into a protected valley for two to three weeks. The larger group provided protection from hostile Indians and support during harsh weather. Small hunting groups traveled outward from the valley to obtain meat. The rendezvous would generally include recreation and entertainment, including contests, games and gambling. Most participants had a good time, swapping tall tales and drinking.

=== Trappers in attendance ===
The 1832 rendezvous was well-attended by trappers affiliated with fur companies, independents, and a large number of allied Indians involved in the fur trade, primarily Flathead and Nez Perce. The Rocky Mountain Fur Company had between one hundred and two hundred men, many led by William L. Sublette, gather at the basin. Jean Baptiste Charbonneau, son of Sacagawea ("Pomp or Pompey"), was also in attendance on behalf of the Rocky Mountain Fur Company and participated in the Battle described below. Sublette and his caravan arrived on July 8. Men from the rival American Fur Company, under the leadership of W. H. Vanderburgh and Andrew Drips, also attended. Other small groups of trappers trickled in to Pierre's Hole, including Jim Bridger, known for his tall tales. Many of these companies were from the Colorado Rocky Mountain area.

Other well-known mountain men at the summer meeting included Joe Meek, a veteran of 22 years, and his friend Milton Sublette, brother of William. Thomas Fitzpatrick, known as "Old Broken Hand", had been in the basin earlier in the year, but had backtracked to meet William Sublette. Events turned sour for Fitzpatrick during his return when he met a party of Blackfeet. Presumed dead by his fellows, the injured Fitzpatrick managed to escape captivity and, with the aid of Iroquois "breed" trapper Antoine Godin and some Flathead allies, return to the rendezvous before the pack trains headed back toward the east.

Two men new to the mountains, Nathaniel Jarvis Wyeth of Cambridge, Massachusetts and explorer Captain Benjamin Bonneville (Irving, Chapter VI) made their first appearance at rendezvous that year. Wyeth led a party of Eastern tenderfeet on their way to Oregon to trade in furs and salmon. Bonneville left a description of the rendezvous:

In this valley was congregated the motley populace connected with the fur trade. Here the two rival companies had their encampments, with their retainers of all kinds: traders, trappers, hunters, and half-breeds, assembled from all quarters, awaiting their yearly supplies, and their orders to start off in new directions. Here, also, the savage tribes connected with the trade, the Nez Perces or Chopunnish Indians, and Flatheads, had pitched their lodges beside the streams, and with their squaws, awaited the distribution of goods and finery. There was, moreover, a band of fifteen free trappers, commanded by a gallant leader from Arkansas, named Sinclair, who held their encampment a little apart from the rest. Such was the wild and heterogeneous assemblage, amounting to several hundred men, civilized and savage, distributed in tents and lodges in the several camps. (Irving, Chapter VI)

== Battle of Pierre's Hole ==
- Pierre's Hole 1832 Battle Area Site
- U.S. National Register of Historic Places
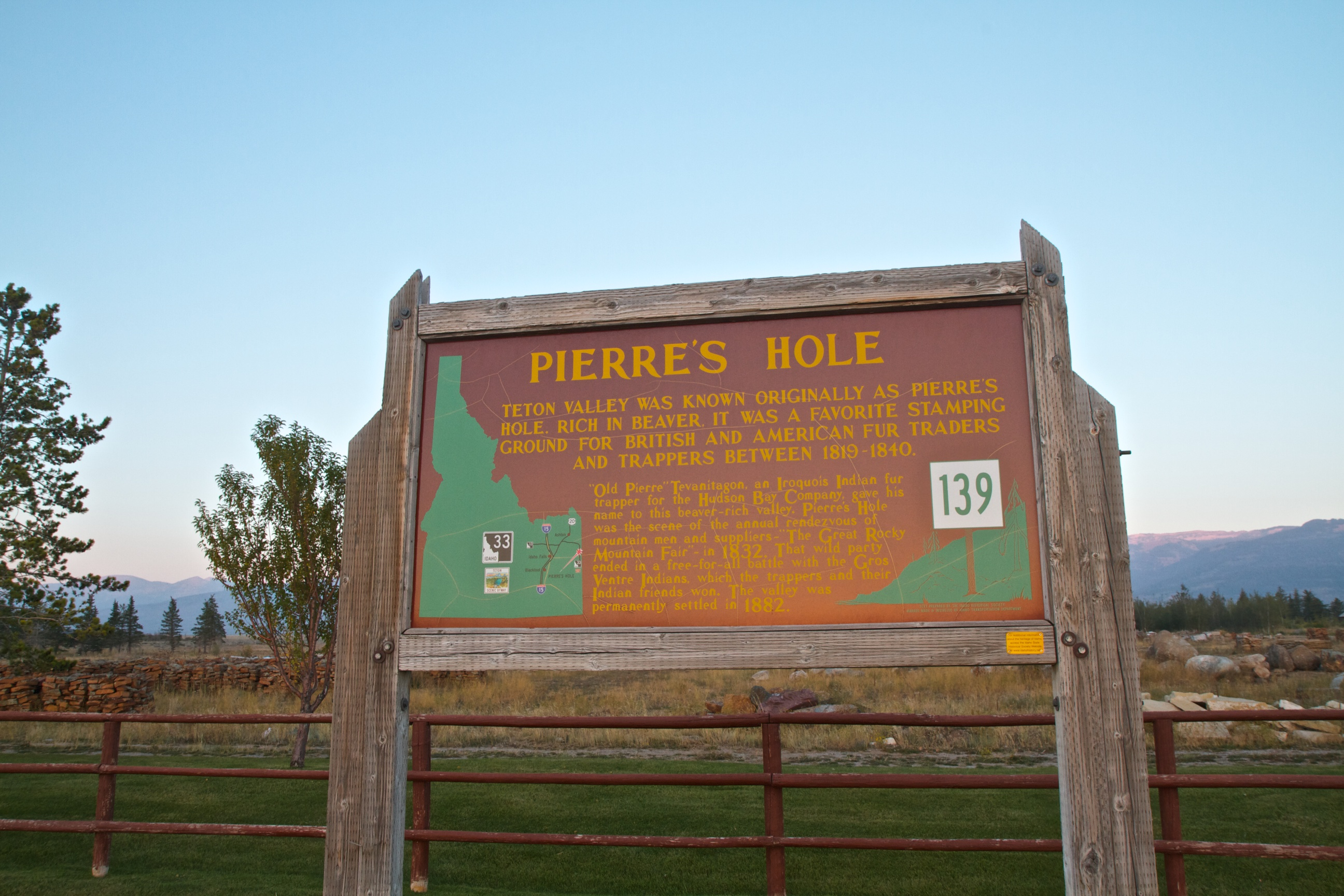

- Location within Idaho Location within the United States
- Nearest city: Driggs, Idaho
- Area: 400 acres (160 ha)
- Built: 1832
- NRHP reference No.: 84001197
- Added to NRHP: September 7, 1984

The Pierre's Hole 1832 Battle Area Site in Teton County, Idaho near Driggs, Idaho was the site of the Battle of Pierre's Hole in 1832. A 400-acre (160 ha) area at the site was listed on the National Register of Historic Places in 1984.

About July 17, the 1832 rendezvous began to break up and fur trappers gradually began to separate into smaller groups. Henry Fraeb and Milton Sublette, with a group of some 100 trappers, planned to head for an area north of the Salt Lake desert. Wyeth and his group of ten or eleven men from New England also set out. These and several other groups briefly traveled together for safety from the Blackfeet.

While in their first night's camp, 8 miles (13 km) south of Pierre's Hole, the combined party was approached by a large migratory group of Gros Ventres – men, women and children with pack animals, traveling from one camping site to another. A chief in the group came forward, apparently in greeting. Antoine Godin and a Flathead Indian "breed" (i.e. a half-breed) companion, sometimes identified as Baptiste Dorian, rode forward, appearing to greet the chief. As the three met, Godin shouted for the Flathead to shoot, which he did, and grabbed the chief's red blanket. The chief fell dead and Godin and the Flathead quickly retreated to the trappers' camp. Some accounts state that Godin paused to take the man's scalp.

The murder provoked an intense battle between the Gros Ventres, with an estimated 250 warriors, and the party of American trappers aided by their Nez Perce and Flathead allies. The badly outnumbered mountain men sent riders to the rendezvous site for aid and prepared the camp for attack. The Gros Ventres took shelter in a swampy thicket of willows and cottonwoods. The Indian women collected fallen trees, throwing them together in a crude fortress.

Aid from the rendezvous camp, under the leadership of William Sublette, including additional Nez Perce and Flatheads, rushed to the scene of the impending battle. In one of five known eye witness accounts, Robert Campbell reported that the newly-arrived William Sublette (the founder of Fort William as one resultant career change because of this battle) made a speech to rouse the men, and he and some 20 trappers, including the experienced Campbell, rushed towards the Indian stronghold in the willows. Milton Sublette took another group and led them against the rear of the ad hoc fort the Gros Ventres had erected. The Flathead and Nez Perce closed on the flanks. Other trappers, including Wyeth and his party, held back and did not participate in the attack. During this initial foray, Milton Sublette was struck by a bullet, which later led to his leg's amputation and, subsequently, his death. The attackers then backed off for a time before renewing hostilities.

The battle raged all day with little gain on either side. As night fell, someone within the Gros Ventres barricade shouted that they had reinforcements, "many Blackfeet", coming. The trappers somehow understood that Gros Ventres reinforcements were attacking the rendezvous camp ground and goods back at Pierre's Hole, and quickly mounted their horses and raced to Pierre's Hole to save their fellow trappers and wealth. However, no hostile Indians had attacked the remnant of the rendezvous. The following morning, returning trappers found the Gros Ventres fortifications abandoned. Thirty horses found nearby included some that had been previously stolen from Sublette's supply train and two that had been taken from Thomas Fitzpatrick during his earlier escape from the Blackfeet.

In the brief but bloody battle at least 26 Gros Ventres were killed, including some women and children, and perhaps a dozen traders and Flatheads. Due to a bullet wound and a broken shoulder, William Sublette returned to the eastern US under the care of Robert Campbell. The party arrived in St. Louis on October 3, 1832. After he recovered, he returned to the east slope of the Rockies to found the trading post and fort sitting aside the gateway to South Pass and the Oregon Country on what was (in 1832 already) being called the Oregon Trail.

== See also ==
- Rocky Mountain Rendezvous — a.k.a. (Trapper's rendezvous)
- Geology of the Grand Teton area
