= Mount Baird =

Mountain in Idaho, United States

- Location within Idaho Location within the United States

Highest point
- Elevation: 10,030 ft (3,060 m)
- Prominence: 1,705 ft (520 m)
- Coordinates: 43°21′46″N 111°05′41″W

Geography
- Location: Caribou-Targhee National Forest, Bonneville County, Idaho, U.S.
- Parent range: Snake River Range
- Topo map: USGS Mount Baird

Climbing
- Easiest route: Scramble

Mount Baird (10,030 feet (3,060 m) is located in the Snake River Range, Caribou-Targhee National Forest, in the U.S. state of Idaho. Mount Baird is the tallest peak in the Snake River Range as well as in Bonneville County, Idaho.
