= Driggs, Idaho =

Driggs
- City
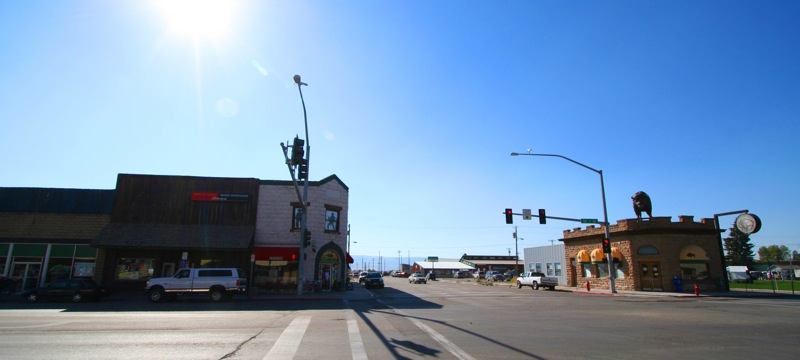
- Driggs in 2006
- Motto: The heart of Teton Valley
- Location of Driggs in Teton County

- Location in Idaho Location in the United States
- Coordinates: 43°44′30″N 111°06′22″W
- Country: United States
- State: Idaho
- County: Teton

Area
  - Total: 2.92 sq mi (7.56 km^{2})
  - Land: 2.92 sq mi (7.56 km^{2})
  - Water: 0 sq mi (0.00 km^{2})
- Elevation: 6,145 ft (1,873 m)

Population (2020)
  - Total: 1,984
  - Estimate (2019): 1,817
  - Density: 623/sq mi (240.5/km^{2})
- Time zone: UTC-7 (Mountain (MST))
  - Summer (DST): UTC-6 (MDT)
- ZIP code: 83422
- Area codes: 208, 986
- FIPS code: 16-22690
- GNIS feature ID: 2410356
- Website: driggsidaho.org

Driggs is a city in the western United States in eastern Idaho and the county seat of Teton County. Part of the Jackson, WY-ID Micropolitan Statistical Area, it is located in Teton Valley, the headwaters of the Teton River. As of the 2020 census, Driggs had a population of 1,984.

Located within city limits is the Driggs-Reed Memorial Airport, a class II airport that can accommodate private aircraft on its 7,300-foot (2,225 m) runway.

== History ==
The Teton Valley was discovered by John Colter in 1808, a member of the Lewis and Clark Expedition (1804–06). It later became known as Pierre's Hole, in honor of "le grand Pierre" Tivanitagon, and hosted the well-attended 1832 Rendezvous, which was followed by the Battle of Pierre's Hole.

Driggs was founded in 1888 by Benjamin Woodbury Driggs, Jr. and Don Carlos Driggs, whose descendants later moved to Arizona (where most live still), and there founded Western Savings and Loan. John Driggs, a descendant of Don Carlos Driggs, later became the mayor of Phoenix, Arizona in the 1970s.

In 2007, National Geographic magazine listed Driggs as one of the 10 best outdoor recreation destinations in the U.S. The Wall Street Journal posited in 2023 that with the expansion of the Grand Targhee Resort 12 miles away in Alta, Wyoming that Driggs could become the next Jackson Hole (much to the dismay of many of its residents).

== Geography ==
According to the United States Census Bureau, the city has a total land area of 2.76 square miles (7.15 km^{2}).

=== Climate ===
This climatic region is typified by large seasonal temperature differences, with warm summers and cold (sometimes severely cold) winters. According to the Köppen Climate Classification system, Driggs has a humid continental climate, abbreviated "Dfb" on climate maps.

Climate data for Driggs, Idaho, 1991–2020 normals, extremes 1904–present
| Month | Jan | Feb | Mar | Apr | May | Jun | Jul | Aug | Sep | Oct | Nov | Dec | Year |
|---|---|---|---|---|---|---|---|---|---|---|---|---|---|
| Record high °F (°C) | 60 (16) | 60 (16) | 72 (22) | 80 (27) | 89 (32) | 95 (35) | 100 (38) | 98 (37) | 96 (36) | 85 (29) | 71 (22) | 65 (18) | 100 (38) |
| Mean maximum °F (°C) | 43.7 (6.5) | 46.4 (8.0) | 56.0 (13.3) | 67.9 (19.9) | 76.8 (24.9) | 83.5 (28.6) | 87.5 (30.8) | 87.4 (30.8) | 82.1 (27.8) | 73.1 (22.8) | 58.9 (14.9) | 46.3 (7.9) | 89.0 (31.7) |
| Mean daily maximum °F (°C) | 32.8 (0.4) | 36.0 (2.2) | 44.3 (6.8) | 53.9 (12.2) | 64.6 (18.1) | 73.2 (22.9) | 82.9 (28.3) | 81.8 (27.7) | 72.7 (22.6) | 58.1 (14.5) | 43.7 (6.5) | 32.8 (0.4) | 56.4 (13.6) |
| Daily mean °F (°C) | 21.0 (−6.1) | 24.2 (−4.3) | 32.3 (0.2) | 40.7 (4.8) | 49.9 (9.9) | 57.2 (14.0) | 65.2 (18.4) | 63.7 (17.6) | 55.5 (13.1) | 43.4 (6.3) | 31.4 (−0.3) | 21.7 (−5.7) | 42.2 (5.7) |
| Mean daily minimum °F (°C) | 9.3 (−12.6) | 12.3 (−10.9) | 20.3 (−6.5) | 27.5 (−2.5) | 35.2 (1.8) | 41.2 (5.1) | 47.5 (8.6) | 45.6 (7.6) | 38.2 (3.4) | 28.7 (−1.8) | 19.0 (−7.2) | 10.5 (−11.9) | 27.9 (−2.2) |
| Mean minimum °F (°C) | −14.5 (−25.8) | −9.9 (−23.3) | 0.2 (−17.7) | 14.1 (−9.9) | 22.2 (−5.4) | 30.4 (−0.9) | 38.1 (3.4) | 35.3 (1.8) | 25.5 (−3.6) | 14.1 (−9.9) | −1.6 (−18.7) | −11.4 (−24.1) | −18.2 (−27.9) |
| Record low °F (°C) | −44 (−42) | −50 (−46) | −30 (−34) | −11 (−24) | 8 (−13) | 21 (−6) | 25 (−4) | 13 (−11) | 9 (−13) | −7 (−22) | −25 (−32) | −40 (−40) | −50 (−46) |
| Average precipitation inches (mm) | 1.95 (50) | 1.07 (27) | 1.37 (35) | 1.90 (48) | 2.30 (58) | 1.97 (50) | 1.06 (27) | 1.23 (31) | 1.47 (37) | 1.77 (45) | 1.52 (39) | 1.74 (44) | 19.35 (491) |
| Average snowfall inches (cm) | 15.7 (40) | 8.7 (22) | 8.8 (22) | 3.7 (9.4) | 0.4 (1.0) | 0.1 (0.25) | 0.0 (0.0) | 0.0 (0.0) | 0.1 (0.25) | 2.6 (6.6) | 9.6 (24) | 19.1 (49) | 68.8 (174.5) |
| Average precipitation days (≥ 0.01 in) | 8.3 | 5.7 | 5.4 | 7.7 | 8.5 | 6.5 | 5.3 | 5.7 | 5.0 | 5.3 | 4.9 | 6.5 | 74.8 |
| Average snowy days (≥ 0.1 in) | 8.1 | 4.1 | 2.9 | 1.7 | 0.2 | 0.0 | 0.0 | 0.0 | 0.0 | 1.2 | 3.7 | 7.2 | 29.1 |
Source 1: NOAA
Source 2: National Weather Service

== Demographics ==
Historical population
| Census | Pop. | Note | %± |
|---|---|---|---|
| 1920 | 683 | | — |
| 1930 | 719 | | 5.3% |
| 1940 | 1,040 | | 44.6% |
| 1950 | 941 | | −9.5% |
| 1960 | 824 | | −12.4% |
| 1970 | 727 | | −11.8% |
| 1980 | 727 | | 0.0% |
| 1990 | 846 | | 16.4% |
| 2000 | 1,100 | | 30.0% |
| 2010 | 1,660 | | 50.9% |
| 2020 | 1,984 | | 19.5% |
| 2019 (est.) | 1,817 | | 9.5% |
U.S. Decennial Census

=== 2020 census ===
As of the 2020 census, Driggs had a population of 1,984. The median age was 33.5 years. 28.0% of residents were under the age of 18 and 10.4% of residents were 65 years of age or older. For every 100 females there were 106.9 males, and for every 100 females age 18 and over there were 107.9 males age 18 and over.

0.0% of residents lived in urban areas, while 100.0% lived in rural areas.

There were 733 households in Driggs, of which 38.3% had children under the age of 18 living in them. Of all households, 43.1% were married-couple households, 23.7% were households with a male householder and no spouse or partner present, and 22.6% were households with a female householder and no spouse or partner present. About 25.8% of all households were made up of individuals and 8.8% had someone living alone who was 65 years of age or older.

There were 961 housing units, of which 23.7% were vacant. The homeowner vacancy rate was 1.8% and the rental vacancy rate was 13.2%.

Racial composition as of the 2020 census
| Race | Number | Percent |
|---|---|---|
| White | 1,380 | 69.6% |
| Black or African American | 10 | 0.5% |
| American Indian and Alaska Native | 26 | 1.3% |
| Asian | 15 | 0.8% |
| Native Hawaiian and Other Pacific Islander | 0 | 0.0% |
| Some other race | 405 | 20.4% |
| Two or more races | 148 | 7.5% |
| Hispanic or Latino (of any race) | 570 | 28.7% |

=== 2010 census ===
As of the census of 2010, there were 1,660 people, 587 households, and 385 families residing in the village. The population density was 601.4 inhabitants per square mile (232.2/km^{2}). There were 873 housing units at an average density of 316.3 per square mile (122.1/km^{2}). The racial makeup of the city was 73.0% White, 0.5% African American, 0.2% Native American, 0.5% Asian, 0.4% Pacific Islander, 23.5% from other races, and 2.0% from two or more races. Hispanic or Latino of any race were 31.6% of the population.

There were 587 households, of which 40.7% had children under the age of 18 living with them, 50.6% were married couples living together, 9.5% had a female householder with no husband present, 5.5% had a male householder with no wife present, and 34.4% were non-families. 22.5% of all of the households were made up of individuals, and 5.2% had someone living alone who was 65 years of age or older. The average household size was 2.82 and the average family size was 3.40.

The median age in the city was 30.6 years. 29.2% of residents were under the age of 18; 9.1% were between the ages of 18 and 24; 33.9% were from 25 to 44; 20.5% were from 45 to 64; and 7% were 65 years of age or older. The gender makeup of the city was 51.4% male and 48.6% female.

=== 2000 census ===
As of the census of 2000, there were 1,100 people, 386 households, and 252 families residing in the city. The population density was 1,054.5 inhabitants per square mile (407.1/km^{2}). There were 449 housing units at an average density of 430.4 per square mile (166.2/km^{2}). The racial makeup of the city was 83.73% White, 0.09% African American, 0.73% Native American, 0.73% Pacific Islander, 13.64% from other races, and 1.09% from two or more races. Hispanic or Latino of any race were 20.55% of the population.

There were 386 households, out of which 38.1% had children under the age of 18 living with them, 51.6% were married couples living together, 7.5% had a female householder with no husband present, and 34.5% were non-families. 23.3% of all households were made up of individuals, and 7.8% had someone living alone who was 65 years of age or older. The average household size was 2.83 and the average family size was 3.44.

The population is spread over various age categories, with 30.5% under the age of 18, 10.8% from 18 to 24, 34.6% from 25 to 44, 15.9% from 45 to 64, and 8.2% who were 65 years of age or older. The median age was 30 years. For every 100 females, there were 112.4 males. For every 100 females age 18 and over, there were 114.3 males.

The median income for a household in the city was $33,750, and the median income for a family was $40,469. Males had a median income of $30,703 versus $19,722 for females. The per capita income for the city was $14,710. About 7.0% of families and 11.2% of the population were below the poverty line, including 6.8% of those under age 18 and 11.6% of those age 65 or over.

== Arts and culture ==
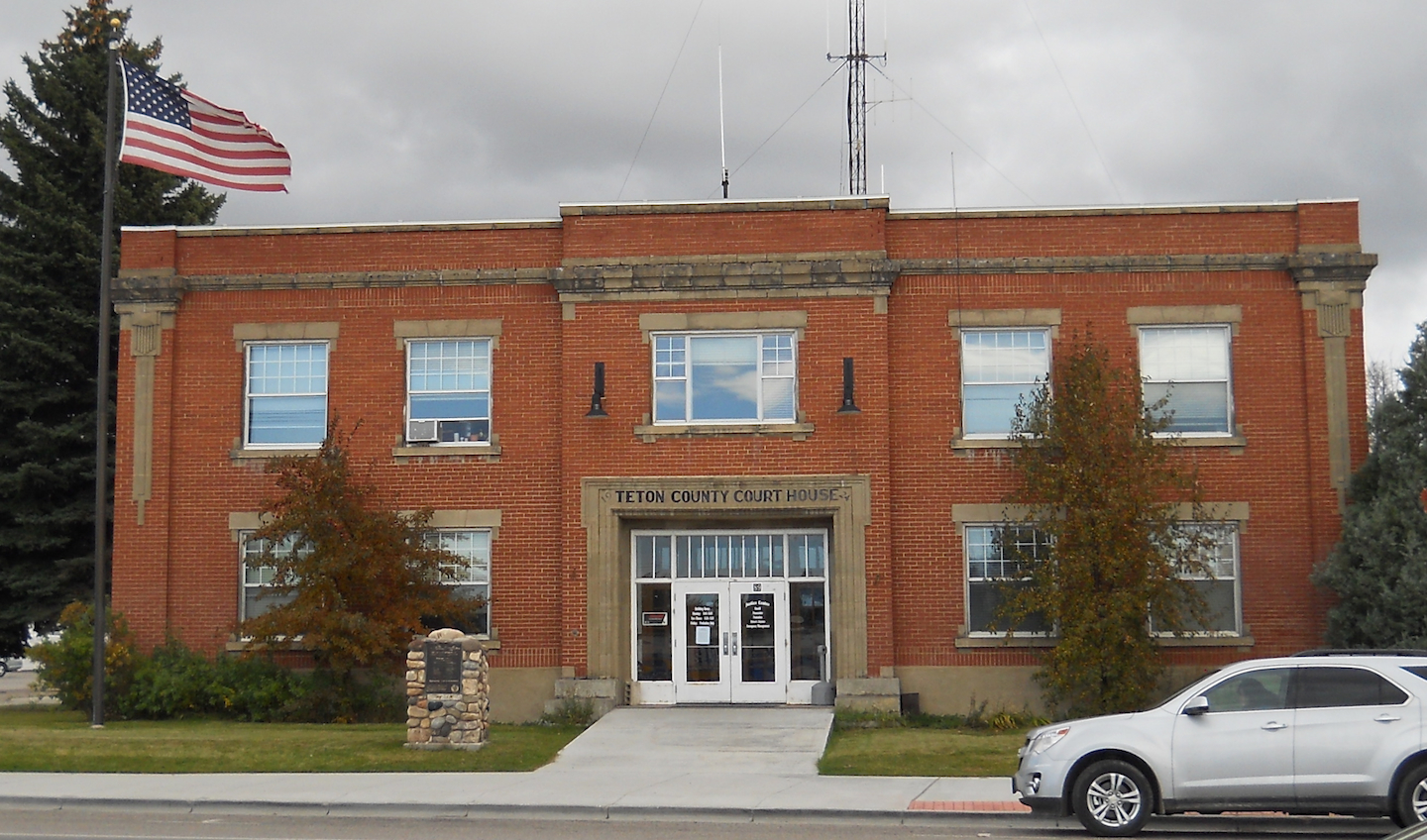
Former Teton County Court House

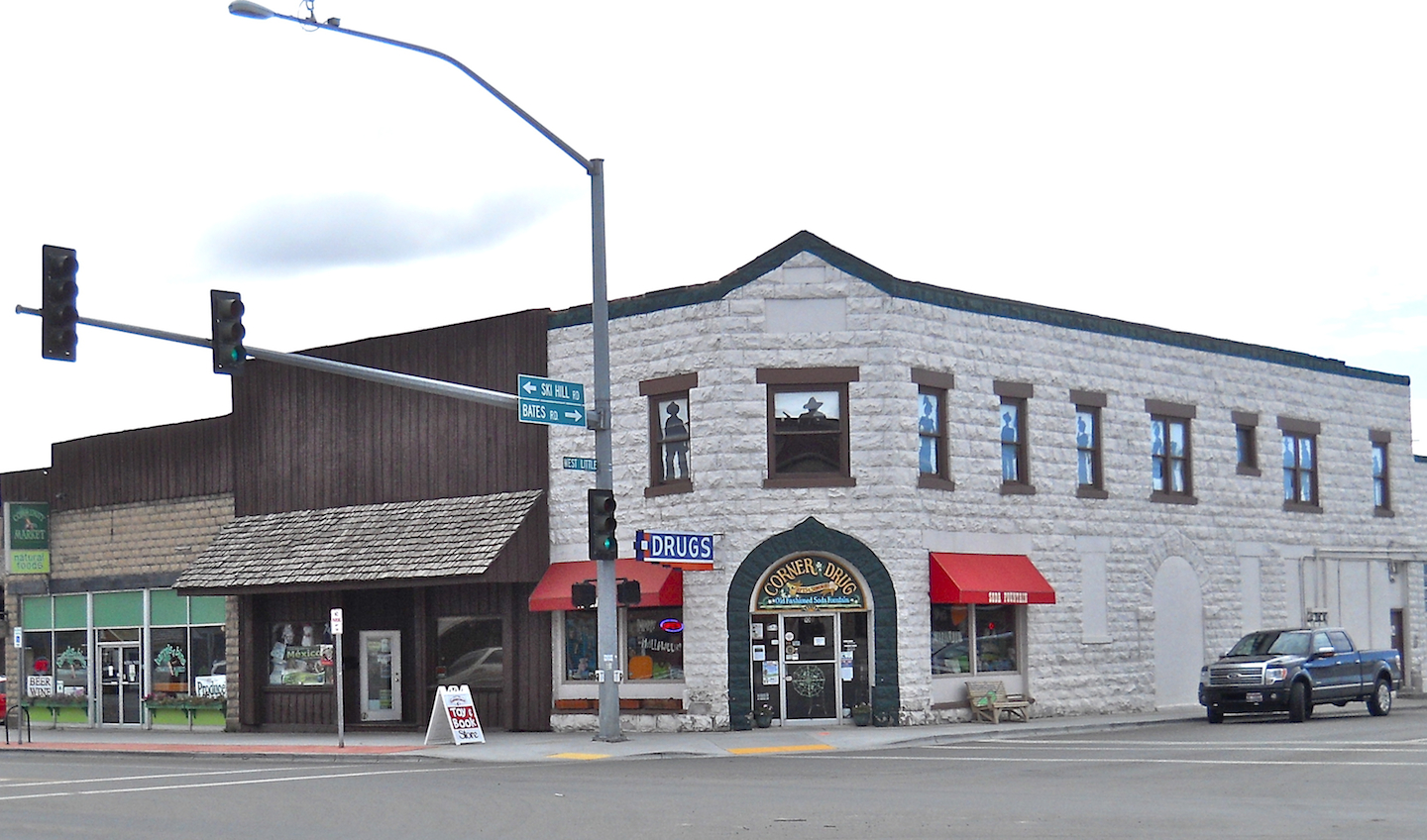
Corner Drug Store

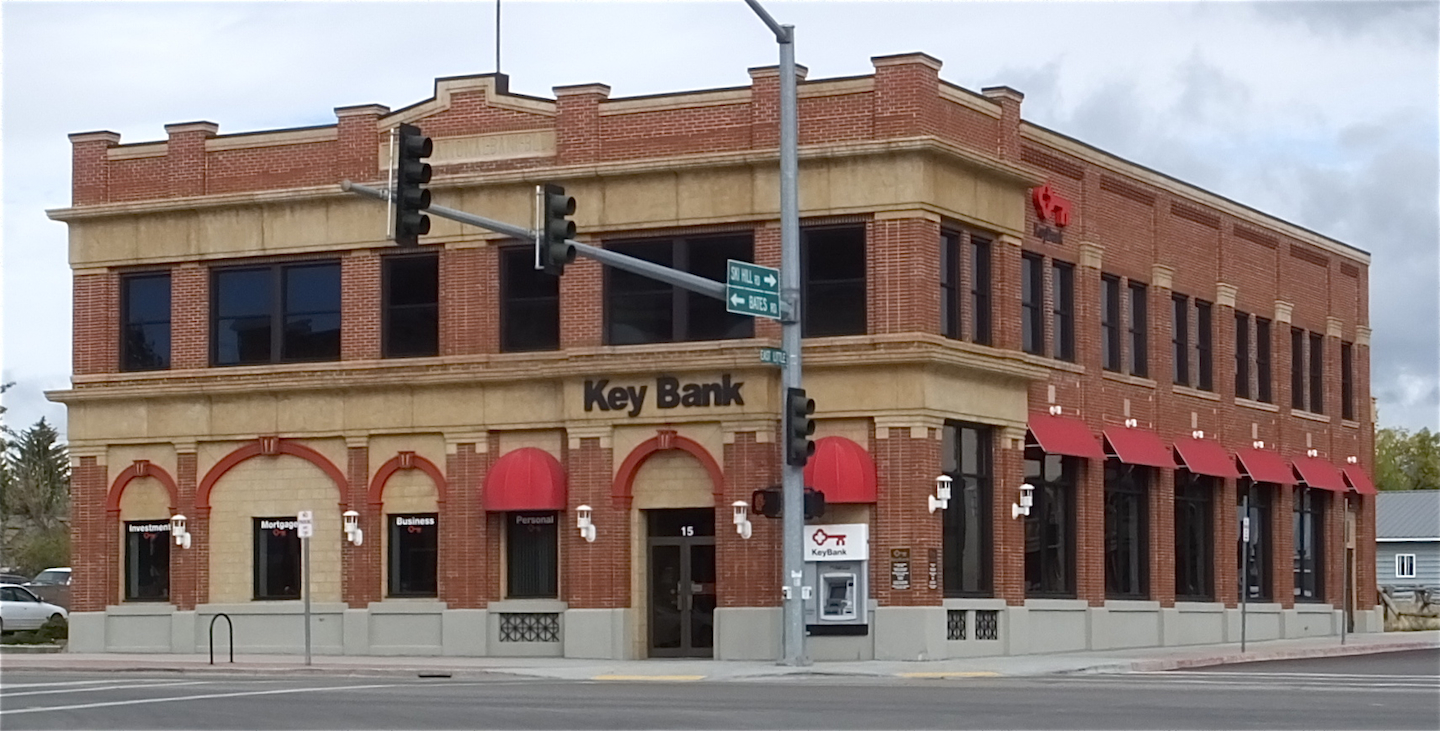
Key Bank

Sites and events in Driggs include:

- an art gallery
- Winter Snowfest, which includes a snow sculpture competition
- Teton Valley Hot Air Balloon Festival
- Shakespeare in the Park
- Plein Air Arts Festival
- Geotourism Center
- "Music on Main", a series of free, outdoor musical concerts during the summer
- SpudFest Family Film and Music Festival at Spud Drive-In Theater (2004-2008)

== Education ==
The public schools of Teton County are operated by Teton School District #401, headquartered in Driggs. The county's only traditional high school (Teton High School), middle school and upper elementary school are in Driggs.

College of Eastern Idaho includes this county in its catchment zone; however this county is not in its taxation zone.

== Infrastructure ==
=== Transportation ===
==== Highway ====
- – SH-33 to Victor (south), and Tetonia (north)

==== Airports ====
- Driggs-Reed Memorial Airport. (IATA: DIJ, ICAO: KDIJ, FAA LID: DIJ)

== Notable people ==
- Hendrika B. Cantwell (1925–2025), clinical professor of pediatrics
- Jeannine Davis-Kimball (1929–2017), archaeologist
- Junius Driggs (1907–1994), banker
- Leon M. Lederman (1922–2018), director of Fermi National Accelerator Laboratory
- Dawn Wells (1938–2020), actress, lived part time in Driggs.
