= Teton River (Idaho) =

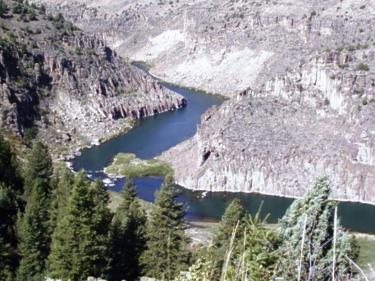
- Teton River in the canyons northeast of Rexburg

- Location of the mouth of the Teton River in Idaho

Location
- Country: United States
- State: Idaho

Physical characteristics
- Source: Confluence of Warm and Drake Creeks
  - location: Near Victor, Teton County
  - coordinates: 43°36′38″N 111°09′16″W
  - elevation: 6,027 ft (1,837 m)
- Mouth: Henrys Fork
  - location: Rexburg, Madison County
  - coordinates: 43°53′56″N 111°50′21″W
  - elevation: 4,829 ft (1,472 m)
- Length: 81.5 mi (131.2 km)
- Basin size: 1,130 sq mi (2,900 km^{2})
- Discharge
  - location: near St. Anthony, 22 mi (35 km) from the mouth
  - average: 829 cu ft/s (23.5 m^{3}/s)
  - minimum: 103 cu ft/s (2.9 m^{3}/s)
  - maximum: 11,000 cu ft/s (310 m^{3}/s)

The Teton River is a 64-mile-long (103 km) tributary of the Henrys Fork of the Snake River in southeastern Idaho in the United States. It drains through the Teton Valley along the west side of the Teton Range along the Idaho-Wyoming border at the eastern end of the Snake River Plain. Its location along the western flank of the Tetons provides the river with more rainfall than many other rivers of the region.

== History ==
At the time of the arrival of the Europeans to the region in the 1820s, the area was inhabited by the Shoshone and various related tribes. The lushness of the Teton Basin provided prime area for the fur trade, attracting many other tribes to the region, including the Nez Perce, Flathead and the Gros Ventre. At the time, the basin was part of the disputed Oregon Country. The resulting friction between the trading groups led to recurring skirmishes in the basin. In 1832, a trade rendezvous gone awry resulted in the Battle of Pierre's Hole between the Gros Ventre and a party of American trappers, led by William Sublette and aided by their Nez Perce and Flathead allies. In the brief but bloody battle at least twenty-six Gros Ventres were killed, including women and children, and perhaps a dozen whites and Flatheads. Sublette received severe injuries and returned east to the United States for medical care.

The most famous modern incident along the river occurred on June 5, 1976 when the earthen Teton Dam in Teton Canyon collapsed, killing 11 people in the valley below. The force of water due to the dam failure destroyed the lower part of the Teton River, washing away riparian zones and reducing the canyon walls. This seriously damaged the stream ecology, and the native cutthroat trout population has been endangered. The force of the water and excessive sediment also damaged stream habitat in the Snake River and some tributaries.

== Watershed ==
Aerial view of the Teton River and Canyon Creek tributary flowing west

The Teton River watershed drains 1,133 square miles (2,930 km^{2}), 806 square miles (2,090 km^{2}) in Idaho and 327 square miles (850 km^{2}) in Wyoming. The river mainstem is formed near Victor in Teton County, Idaho, near the Wyoming state line, by the confluence of Warm Creek (Trail Creek watershed) and Drake Creek. It is joined by several additional creeks that descend from surrounding Teton, Big Hole, and Snake River mountain ranges. The majority of flows to the Teton River come from tributaries draining the western flank of the Tetons, including Trail, Fox, Teton, and South Leigh creeks. Trail Creek descends along Highway 22 from the Caribou-Targhee National Forest in Idaho, meeting the other creeks from the south. The river flows north in a slow meandering course through a broad flat valley called the Teton Basin (formerly known as "Pierre's Hole"), flanked by the Teton Range to the east and the Big Hole Mountains to the west. Much of the river's upper course in the Teton Basin is surrounded by extensive wetlands.

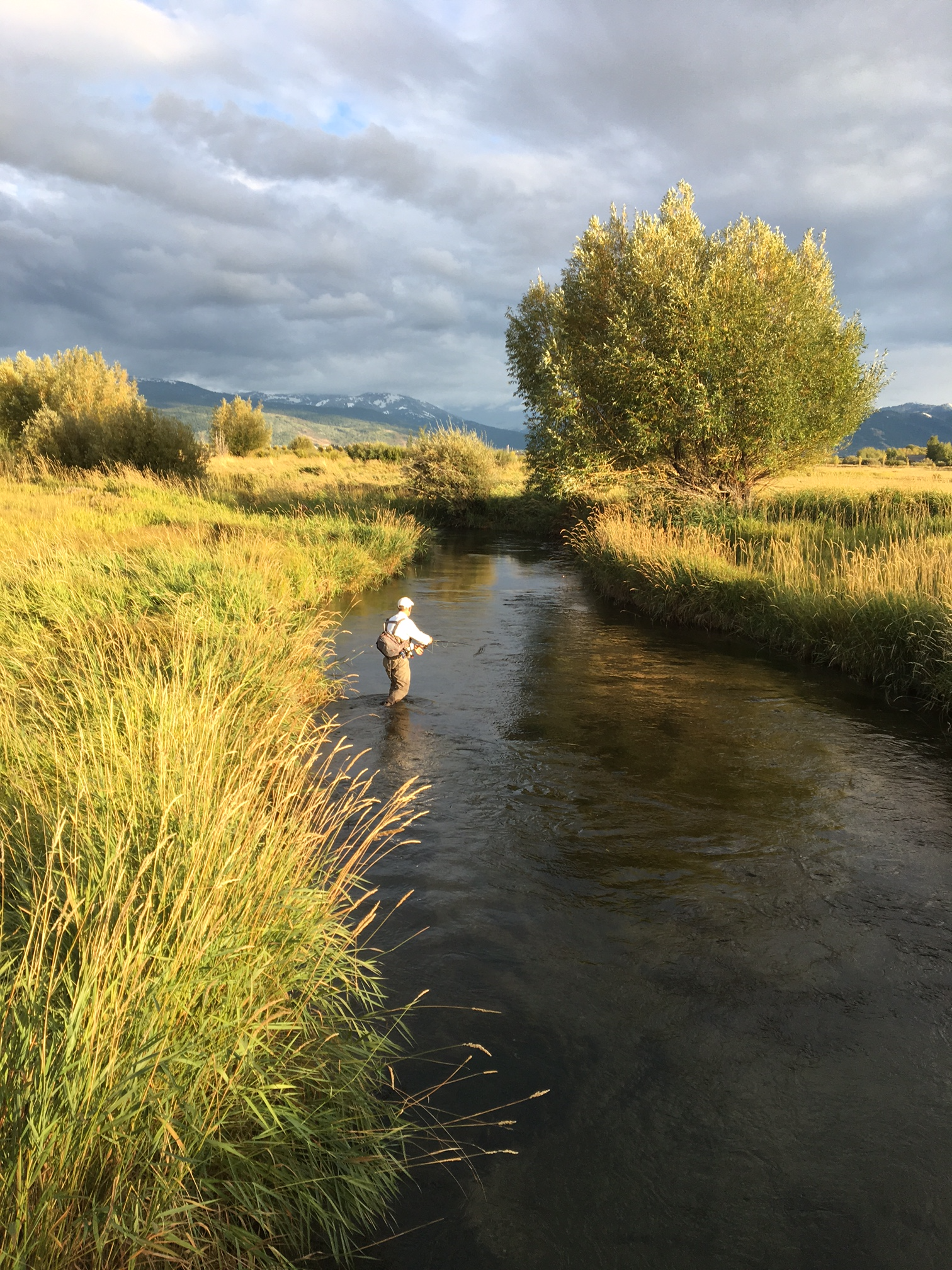
Flyfisherman on private water in restored section of Fox Creek, a tributary of the Teton River

After emerging from the north end of the Teton Basin, the Teton River enters the nearly inaccessible Teton Canyon, approximately 25 miles (40 km) long, along the Teton-Fremont county line. There it is joined by Badger Creek and Bitch Creek from the east, then turns almost 90 degrees west, and is joined by Canyon Creek from the south. After passing through the failed Teton Dam site, north and east of Newdale, the Teton River bifurcates into two distributaries some four miles downstream, just north of Teton, one called the South Fork Teton River (also called the South Teton River) and the other called North Fork Teton River (also known as the Teton River). The South Teton River travels generally southwest until it joins Henry's Fork west of Rexburg at the southwest end of a large inland delta region on the Henry's Fork, essentially merging with the delta from the east as one of its channels. The Teton River itself (North Fork Teton) continues to travel west, where it joins the Henrys Fork at Warm Slough near Rexburg, approximately seven miles upstream of the confluence with the Snake River.

== Ecology ==
The upper watershed between Victor and Driggs are key targets for restoration by the Friends of Teton River as they harbor the best spawning habitat for Yellowstone cutthroat trout (Oncorhynchus clarkii bouvieri). An Idaho Fish and Game study reported a 95% decline in Yellowstone cutthroat trout (YCT) while non-native brook trout (Salvenlinus fontinalis) and rainbow trout (Oncorhynchus mykiss) populations increased by 300%. The Teton River is considered one of three remaining strongholds for YCT, which currently only survive in 27% of their former range in the Greater Yellowstone Ecosystem. Hybridization with nonnative rainbow trout has been the primary factor reducing YCT populations. Other factors include competition with nonnative brook trout and habitat degradation from water diversion, grazing, mining, timber harvest and development.

== See also ==
- List of Idaho rivers
- List of longest streams of Idaho
