= Teton High School =

Coordinates: 43.731°N 111.100°W

- 555 Ross Ave; Driggs, Idaho; United States

Information
- Type: Public
- School district: Teton S.D (#401)
- Principal: Kristin Weston
- Teaching staff: 37.11 (FTE)
- Grades: 9–12
- Enrollment: 606 (2024-2025)
- Student to teacher ratio: 16.33
- Colors: Orange & maroon
- Athletics: IHSAA Class 4A
- Athletics conference: Mountain Rivers
- Mascot: Timberwolves
- Rival: Jackson Hole High School (Battle of the Tetons)
- Newspaper: We Are Teton
- Feeder schools: Teton Middle School
- Elevation: 6,160 ft (1,880 m) AMSL
- Website: Teton High School

Location in the United States
Location in Idaho

Teton High School is a four-year public secondary school in Driggs, Idaho. It is the only traditional high school in Teton School District #401 and Teton County. The school colors are maroon and orange and the mascot is the Timberwolves.

== Athletics ==
Teton competes in athletics in IHSAA Class 4A and is a member of the Mountain Rivers Conference.

=== State titles ===
Boys

- Football (1): fall (A-3) 1999 (official with introduction of A-3 playoffs, fall 1977)
- Cross Country (4): fall (3A) 2008, 2010, 2011, 2012 (introduced in 1964)
- Soccer (3): fall (3A) 2006, 2016; (4A) 2026 (introduced in 2000)
- Basketball (7): (one class) 1921; (A-3) 1966, 1975, 1976, 1977, 1995, 1997
- Wrestling (14): (B, now 3A) 1964, 1965, 1966, 1968, 1969, 1970, 1971, 1972, 1973, 1977; (A-3) 1982, 1983, 1985, 1992 (introduced in 1958)

Girls

- Cross Country (1): fall (A-3) 1998 (introduced in 1974)
- Soccer (1): fall (3A) 2007 (introduced in 2000)

== Mascot controversy ==
In June 2013 the school superintendent announced that the school would drop its longtime "Redskins" nickname, logo and mascot to show respect for Native Americans. However, the decision was not immediately implemented due to the costs, and the school board had not taken any further action. Two months later, after intense opposition by some residents, the superintendent said the Redskin mascot would remain and the issue would be revisited in the future.

In July, 2019 the school board for the Teton School District voted 4-1 to retire the nickname with the stipulation no taxpayer money goes toward the removal process; after two of Idaho’s largest Native American tribes, the Shoshone-Bannock and the Nez Perce urged the change, citing the word’s offensive definition by major dictionaries and its use as a racial slur.

On June 16, 2020, Teton School District officially announced that the school’s new mascot will be known as the Timberwolves.

== Notable alumni ==
- George V. Hansen - Former member of the U.S. House of Representatives
- Spencer Nead - Former NFL fullback
- Amanda Otto - Professional musher and sled dog racer
