= Snake River Range =

Mountain range in Wyoming and Idaho, United States

Highest point
- Peak: Mount Baird
- Elevation: 10,025 ft (3,056 m)
- Coordinates: 43°21′46″N 111°05′41″W

Dimensions
- Length: 33 mi (53 km) E/W
- Width: 30 mi (48 km) N/S
- Area: 528 mi^{2} (1,370 km^{2})

Geography
- Country: United States
- States: Wyoming and Idaho
- Parent range: Rocky Mountains

The Snake River Range is located in the U.S. states of Wyoming and Idaho and includes 10 mountains over 9,000 feet (2,700 m). The tallest peak in the range is Mount Baird at 10,030 feet (3,060 m). The range trends northwest to southeast and is bordered on the north by the Teton Range and the two ranges meet at Teton Pass. The Snake River Range is bordered by the Palisades Reservoir to the west and the Snake River, which sweeps completely around the eastern, southern and western part of the range. The range is approximate 30 miles (48 km) north to south and 33 miles (53 km) west to east, covering 528 square miles (1,370 km^{2}). Along the southern boundary, the Snake River passes through Grand Canyon, also known as the Snake River Canyon. U.S. Route 26/U.S. Route 89 follows the course of the Snake River from Hoback Junction to the Palisades Reservoir.

== See also ==
- List of mountain ranges in Wyoming
- List of mountain ranges in Idaho
