= Border Junction, Wyoming =

- Unincorporated community
- Location of Border Junction in Wyoming Border Junction (the United States)
- Coordinates: 42°12′48″N 111°02′33″W
- Country: United States of America
- State: Wyoming
- County: Lincoln
- Elevation: 6,115 ft (1,864 m)
- Time zone: UTC–7 (Mountain (MST))
  - Summer (DST): UTC–6 (MDT)
- GNIS feature ID: 1597226

Border Junction
- Border, Wyoming
- Interactive map of Border Junction

Location
- Lincoln County, Wyoming
- Roads at junction: US 30 (Lincoln Highway); WYO 89; Lincoln County Road 134

Construction
- Type: intersection

Border Junction or Border is a populated place and road intersection in the far western part of Lincoln County, Wyoming, United States. US Route 30 is the major road, which leads northwest to Montpelier, Idaho, in Bear Lake County, and southeast to Cokeville. Wyoming Highway 89 runs north toward US Route 89, and southeast concurrently with US 30. Lincoln County Road 134 runs briefly south toward some homes and ranches. The Union Pacific Railroad passes Border Junction in the direction of Rock Springs to the east and Pocatello, Idaho, to the west.

== Geography ==
Border Junction lies at an elevation of 6,115 feet (1,864 m), approximately 0.25 miles (0.40 km) east of the Wyoming-Idaho state line. It is in the Thomas Fork valley of the Bear River, just west of the Sublette Mountains (and Sublette Mountain, the highest summit of the Southern Wyoming Overthrust Belt).

In September and October, approximately 5000 sandhill cranes migrate through the Border Junction area.

== History ==
The Overland Stage Route came north to Border Junction from Fort Bridger, along a path now through Cokeville, Sage, and Lyman. Emigrants forded the Thomas Fork west of Border Junction by toll bridge, and wagon ruts are still visible on the ridges.
