= Utah State Route 16 =

State highway in Rich County, Utah, U.S.

State Route 16
- SR-16 highlighted in red

Route information
- Maintained by UDOT
- Length: 29.359 mi (47.249 km)
- Existed: 1921 as a state highway; 1920s as SR-3; renumbered 1962–present

Major junctions
- South end: WYO 89 near Woodruff
- SR-39 in Woodruff
- North end: SR-30 at Sage Creek Junction

Location
- Country: United States
- State: Utah

Highway system
- Utah State Highway System; Interstate; US; State; Minor; Scenic
← I-15	→ SR-17

State Route 16 (SR-16) is a state highway in northeastern Utah, running for 29.359 miles (47.249 km) in Rich County from the Wyoming state line near Woodruff to Sage Creek Junction. It serves as part of a road from Evanston, Wyoming to Jackson Hole, Wyoming.

== Route description ==
SR-16 begins at the Wyoming state line south of Woodruff, as an extension of WYO 89, and heads northwest ten miles (16 km) to Woodruff, where it turns north through the town center.

SR-16 then continues north ten miles (16 km) to Randolph, running through the town center. North of Randolph, it runs generally north-northeast nine miles (14 km) to end at an intersection with SR-30 at Sage Creek Junction.

== History ==
A 1921 law added the portion of the road from Evanston, Wyoming to Montpelier, Idaho in Utah to the state highway system, as well as the branch towards Kemmerer, Wyoming. The State Road Commission assigned the State Route 3 designation to the highway that decade, and in 1927 the legislature officially adopted the number for the main route and the spur. The spur was split off as SR-51 in 1931, but the remainder stayed as SR-3 until 1962, when it was renumbered SR-16. In the 1977 renumbering, only the section south of Sage Creek Junction remained, as the rest became SR-30 (signed since 1966) and US-89 (signed since the 1930s).

== Major intersections ==
The entire route is in Rich County.

Location	mi	km	Destinations	Notes
	0.000	0.000	WYO 89 south – Evanston	Southern terminus; continuation into Wyoming
Woodruff	10.505	16.906	SR-39 west (Center Street) – Huntsville, Ogden	
Sage Creek Junction	29.359	47.249	SR-30 to WYO 89 north – Laketown, Garden City, Cokeville, Kemmerer	Northern terminus
1.000 mi = 1.609 km; 1.000 km = 0.621 mi: Route transition
