= List of highways numbered 231 =

The following highways are numbered 231:

== Canada ==
- Manitoba Provincial Road 231
- Newfoundland and Labrador Route 231
- Prince Edward Island Route 231
- Quebec Route 231

== Costa Rica ==
- National Route 231

== India ==
- National Highway 231 (India)

== Japan ==
- Japan National Route 231

== Nigeria ==
- A231 highway (Nigeria)

== United Kingdom ==
- A231 road
- B231 road

== United States ==
- U.S. Route 231
- Arkansas Highway 231
- California State Route 231 (former)
- Colorado State Highway 231
- Florida State Road 231
- Georgia State Route 231
- K-231 (Kansas highway)
- Kentucky Route 231 (former)
- Maine State Route 231
- Maryland Route 231
- M-231 (Michigan highway)
- Minnesota State Highway 231 (former)
- Missouri Route 231
- Montana Secondary Highway 231
- Nevada State Route 231
- New Mexico State Road 231
- New York State Route 231
- North Carolina Highway 231
- Ohio State Route 231
- Oregon Route 231 (former)
- Pennsylvania Route 231
- South Dakota Highway 231
- Tennessee State Route 231
- Texas State Highway 231
  - Texas State Highway Loop 231
  - Texas State Highway Spur 231
- Utah State Route 231
- Virginia State Route 231
- Wyoming Highway 231

Preceded by 230	Lists of highways 231	Succeeded by 232
