= Idaho State Highway 34 =

State highway in Franklin and Caribou counties in Idaho, United States

State Highway 34
- Pioneer Historic Byway
- SH-34 highlighted in red

Route information
- Maintained by ITD
- Length: 105.980 mi (170.558 km)

Major junctions
- South end: US 91 / SH-36 in Preston
- US 30 in Soda Springs
- North end: WYO 239 near Freedom

Location
- Country: United States
- State: Idaho
- Counties: Franklin, Caribou

Highway system
- Idaho State Highway System; Interstate; US; State
← SH-33	→ SH-36

State Highway 34 (SH-34) is a state highway serving Franklin and Caribou counties in southeastern Idaho. The highway runs northeasterly along the Bear River from Preston towards Soda Springs and the Wyoming state line, where it terminates and becomes Wyoming Highway 239.

The entire highway is designated as the Pioneer Historic Byway, a National Scenic Byway following a historic pioneer route. The designation continues south on U.S. Route 91 through Preston and Franklin towards the Utah state line.

== Route description ==
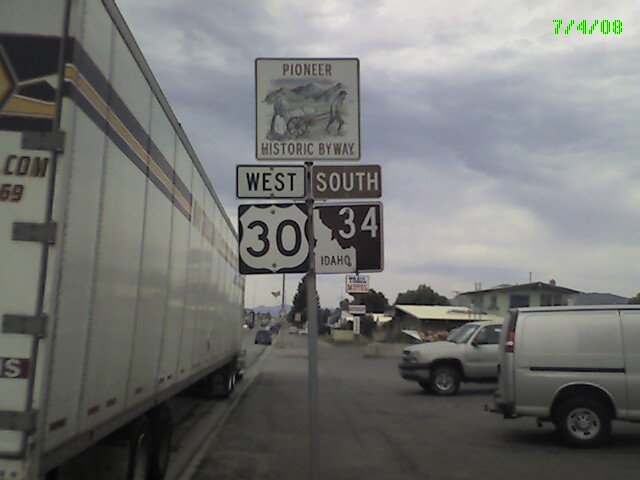
Westbound US 30/SH-34 in Soda Springs

State Highway 34 begins north of downtown Preston at an intersection with U.S. Route 91. The highway, temporarily concurrent with State Highway 36, travels north from Preston through the communities of Thatcher and Grace, following the course of the Bear River. North of Grace, State Highway 34 intersects U.S. Route 30 and becomes concurrent with the highway while continuing east into Soda Springs. From Soda Spring, the highway continues north towards the Blackfoot Reservoir and Grays Lake National Wildlife Refuge, turning east to cross the Caribou Mountains. State Highway 34 ends at the Wyoming state line north of Freedom, where Wyoming Highway 239 begins its short route to U.S. Route 89.

== History ==
The Bear Lake–Caribou Scenic Route was designated as a state scenic byway in December 1988.

== Major intersections ==
County	Location	mi	km	Destinations	Notes
Franklin	Preston	7.620	12.263	US 91 / SH-36 west – Preston, Logan, Pocatello	Southern end of SH-36 concurrency
Franklin		13.102	21.086	SH-36 east – Montpelier	Northern end of SH-36 concurrency
Caribou		50.476	81.233	US 30 west – Pocatello, Bancroft, Pocatello	Southern end of US 30 concurrency
Caribou	Soda Springs	57.757	92.951	US 30 east – Montpelier	Northern end of US 30 concurrency
Caribou		113.600	182.821	WYO 239 east (State Line Road) to US 89	Northern terminus; continues as WY 239
1.000 mi = 1.609 km; 1.000 km = 0.621 mi: Concurrency terminus

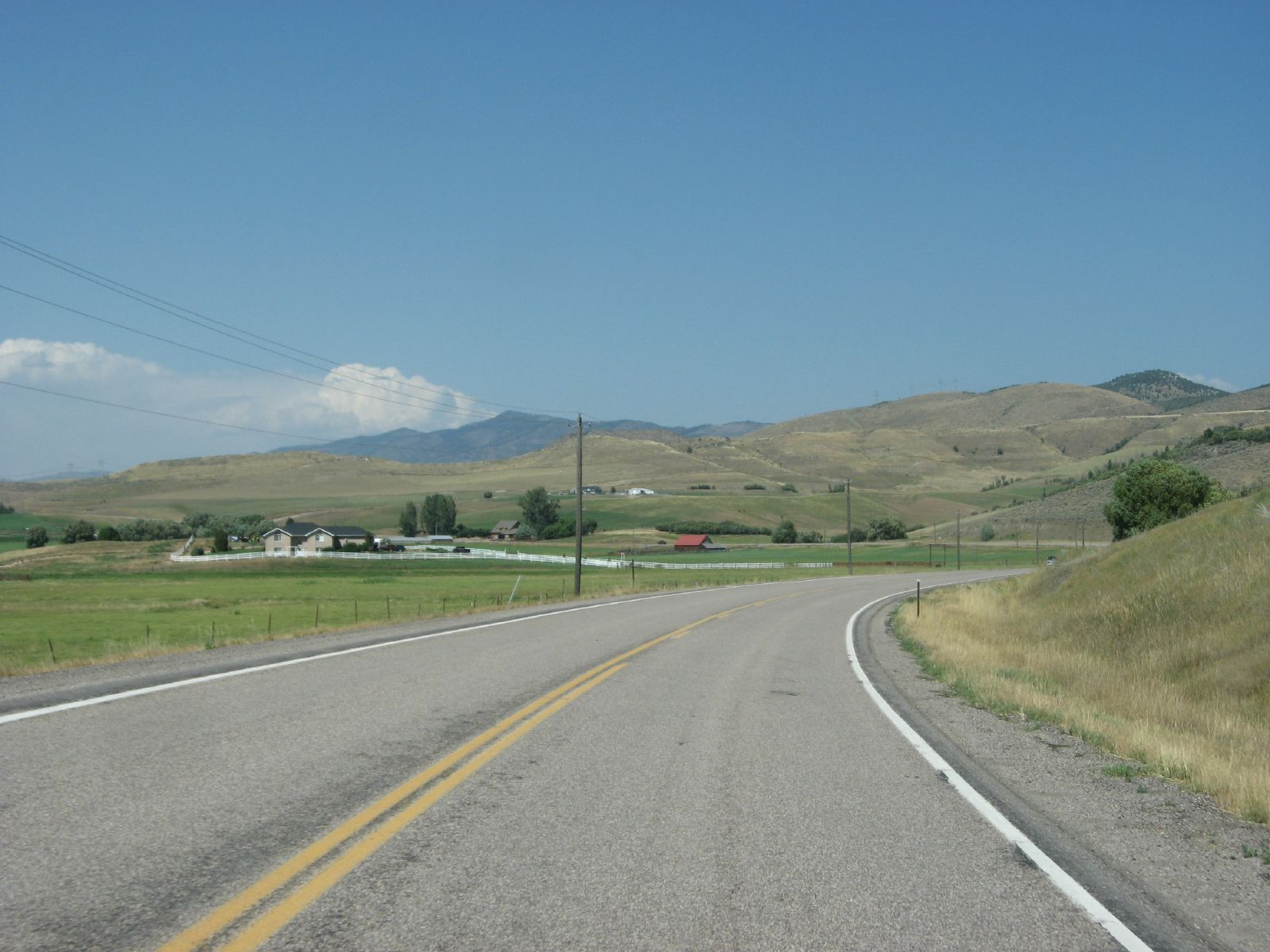

== See also ==
- List of state highways in Idaho
- List of highways numbered 34
