= U.S. Route 89 in Idaho =

State highway in Idaho, United States

U.S. Highway 89
- US 89 highlighted in red

Route information
- Maintained by ITD
- Length: 44.240 mi (71.197 km)

Major junctions
- South end: US 89 at the Utah state line near Garden City, UT
- US 30 in Montpelier
- North end: US 89 at the Wyoming state line near Montpelier

Location
- Country: United States
- State: Idaho
- Counties: Bear Lake

Highway system
- United States Numbered Highway System; List; Special; Divided; Idaho State Highway System; Interstate; US; State
← SH-87	→ US 91

U.S. Route 89 (US 89) is a part of the U.S. Highway System that travels Flagstaff, Arizona, north to the Canadian border; Broken into two segments by Yellowstone National Park where unnumbered park roads serve as a connector. In the state of Idaho, it extends approximately 44 miles (71 km) from the Utah state line near Glencoe to the Wyoming state line near Geneva.

== Route description ==
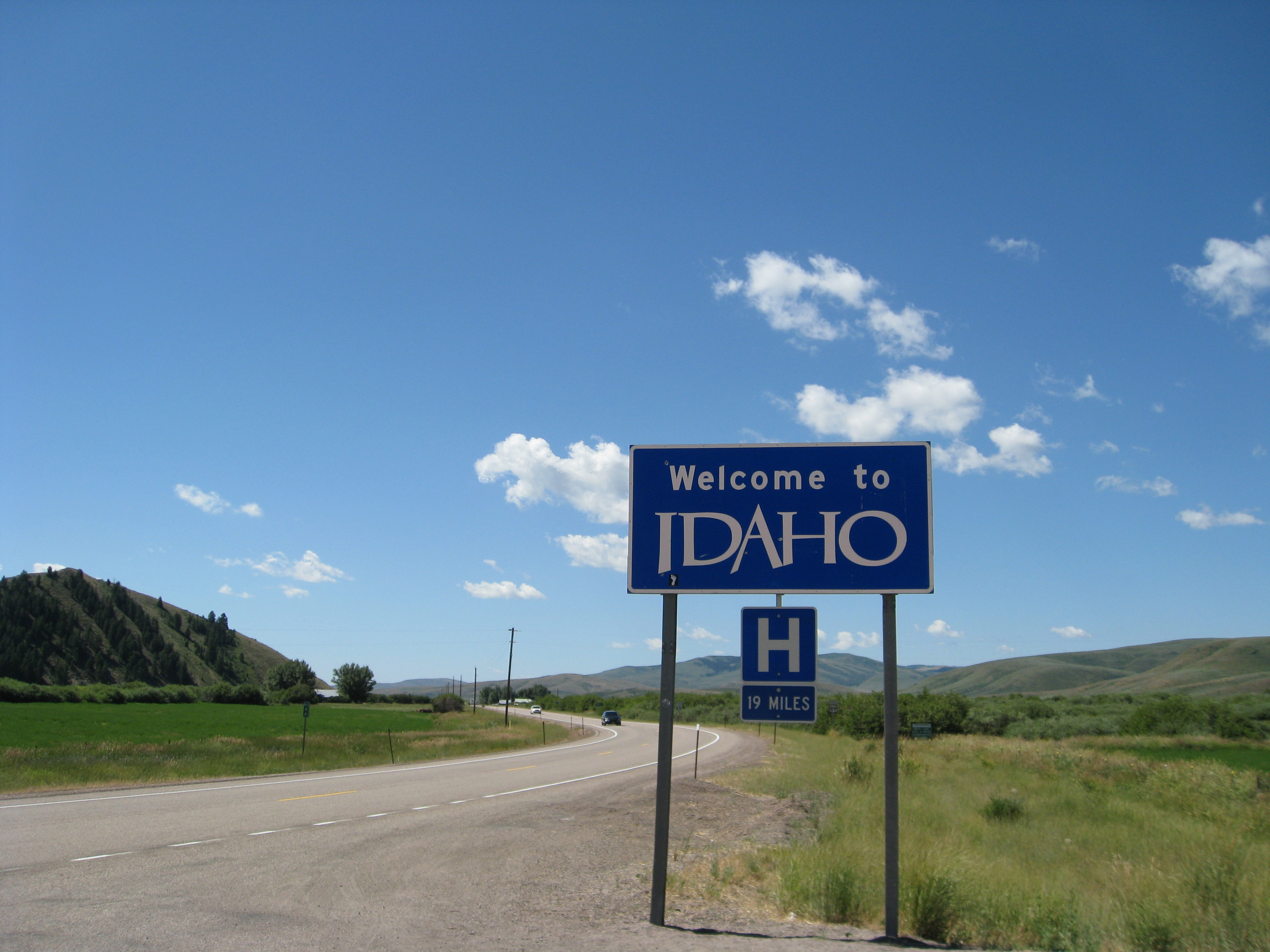
US 89 heading south along the Idaho/Wyoming state line

US 89 enters Bear Lake County from Utah along the western shore of Bear Lake, passing through Glencoe, Fish Haven, and St. Charles. North of the lake, it continues through Bloomington, Paris (the county seat for Bear Lake County), and Ovid before reaching Montpelier, the largest community along the route. US 89 shares a short concurrency with US 30 in Montpelier before it continues eastward over the Preuss Range, a subrange of the Peale Mountains. It crosses Geneva Summit and passes through Geneva before crossing into Wyoming.

== Major intersections ==
The entire route is in Bear Lake County.

Location	mi	km	Destinations	Notes
Glencoe	0.000	0.000	US 89 south – Logan, Salt Lake City	Continuation into Utah
Ovid	20.150– 20.230	32.428– 32.557	SH-36 west – Preston	
Montpelier	25.984	41.817	US 30 east (4th Street) – Kemmerer	Southern end of US 30 concurrency
Montpelier	26.280	42.294	US 30 west (4th Street) – Soda Springs, Pocatello	Northern end of US 30 concurrency
	35.475	57.091	Geneva Summit – elevation 6,938 ft (2,115 m)	
Geneva	41.170	66.257	SH-61 south to WYO 89 – Kemmerer, Cokeville	
	44.240	71.197	US 89 north – Jackson	Continuation into Wyoming
1.000 mi = 1.609 km; 1.000 km = 0.621 mi: Concurrency terminus

== See also ==
U.S. Route 89
Previous state: Utah	Idaho	Next state: Wyoming
