= List of highways numbered 239 =

The following highways are numbered 239:

== Australia ==
Borung Highway

== Canada ==
- Manitoba Provincial Road 239
- Newfoundland and Labrador Route 239
- Nova Scotia Route 239
- Prince Edward Island Route 239
- Quebec Route 239

== Costa Rica ==
- National Route 239

== Japan ==
- Japan National Route 239

== United Kingdom ==
- A239 road

== United States ==
- Arkansas Highway 239
  - Arkansas Highway 239 Spur
- Alabama State Route 239
- California State Route 239
- Colorado State Highway 239
- Florida State Road 239 (former)
- Georgia State Route 239 (former)
- Iowa Highway 239 (former)
- K-239 (Kansas highway)
- Kentucky Route 239
- Maryland Route 239
- M-239 (Michigan highway)
- Montana Secondary Highway 239
- New York State Route 239 (former)
- Ohio State Route 239
- Pennsylvania Route 239
- South Dakota Highway 239
- Tennessee State Route 239
- Texas State Highway 239
  - Texas State Highway Loop 239
  - Texas State Highway Spur 239
- Utah State Route 239 (former)
- Virginia State Route 239
- Wyoming Highway 239

Preceded by 238	Lists of highways 239	Succeeded by 240
