= List of highways numbered 229 =

The following highways are numbered 229:

== Canada ==
- Manitoba Provincial Road 229
- Prince Edward Island Route 229
- Quebec Route 229
- Saskatchewan Highway 229

== Costa Rica ==
- National Route 229

== India ==
- National Highway 229 (India)

== Japan ==
- Japan National Route 229

== United Kingdom ==
- A229 road
- B229 road

== United States ==
- Interstate 229
- Alabama State Route 229
- California State Route 229
- Connecticut Route 229
- Florida State Road 229 (former)
- Georgia State Route 229 (former)
  - County Route 229 (Newton County, Georgia)
- Indiana State Road 229
- Iowa Highway 229 (former)
- Kentucky Route 229
- Maine State Route 229
- Maryland Route 229
- Nevada State Route 229
- New Mexico State Road 229
- New York State Route 229 (former)
- Ohio State Route 229
- Oregon Route 229
- Pennsylvania Route 229 (former)
- Tennessee State Route 229
- Texas State Highway 229 (former)
- Utah State Route 229 (former)
- Virginia State Route 229

Preceded by 228	Lists of highways 229	Succeeded by 230
