= List of highways numbered 241 =

Route 241 or Highway 241 may refer to:

== Canada ==
- Manitoba Provincial Road 241
- Prince Edward Island Route 241
- Quebec Route 241

== Costa Rica ==
- National Route 241

== Cuba ==
- Pinar del Rio–Vinales Road (1–241)
- Cotorro–Jaruco Road (2–241)

== Japan ==
- Japan National Route 241

== United Kingdom ==
- B241 road

== United States ==
- U.S. Route 241 (former)
  - U.S. Route 241 (1926)
  - U.S. Route 241 (1930s)
- Alabama State Route 241
- Arkansas Highway 241
- California State Route 241
- Florida State Road 241 (former)
- Georgia State Route 241
- Indiana State Road 241
- Kentucky Route 241
- Maryland Route 241 (former)
- Minnesota State Highway 241
- Montana Secondary Highway 241
- New Mexico State Road 241
- New York State Route 241
- North Carolina Highway 241
- Ohio State Route 241
- Oregon Route 241
- Pennsylvania Route 241
- Tennessee State Route 241
- Texas State Highway 241 (former)
  - Texas State Highway Spur 241
  - Farm to Market Road 241
- Utah State Route 241
- Virginia State Route 241
- Washington State Route 241
- Wisconsin Highway 241
- Wyoming Highway 241

Preceded by 240	Lists of highways 241	Succeeded by 242
