= U.S. Route 89 in Wyoming =

Segment of American highway

U.S. Highway 89
- US 89 highlighted in red

Route information
- Maintained by WYDOT
- Length: 155.610 mi (250.430 km)

Major junctions
- South end: US 89 at the Idaho state line near Montpelier, ID
- US 26 from Alpine to Moran; US 189 from Hoback to Jackson; US 191 from Hoback to Yellowstone National Park; US 287 from Moran to Yellowstone National Park
- North end: Southern entrance of Yellowstone National Park

Location
- Country: United States
- State: Wyoming
- Counties: Lincoln, Teton

Highway system
- United States Numbered Highway System; List; Special; Divided; Wyoming State Highway System; Interstate; US; State
| ← US 87 | → WYO 89 |

U.S. Route 89 (US 89) is a part of the U.S. Highway System that travels Flagstaff, Arizona, north to the Canadian border; broken into two segments by Yellowstone National Park where unnumbered park roads serve as a connector. In the state of Wyoming, it extends approximately 156 miles (251 km) from the Idaho state line near Geneva, Idaho to the southern entrance of Yellowstone National Park. US 89 passes through many scenic sites including Grand Teton National Park, the Jackson Hole valley, the Snake River Canyon, and Star Valley and is the backbone visitor highway for two U.S. National Parks.

== Route description ==
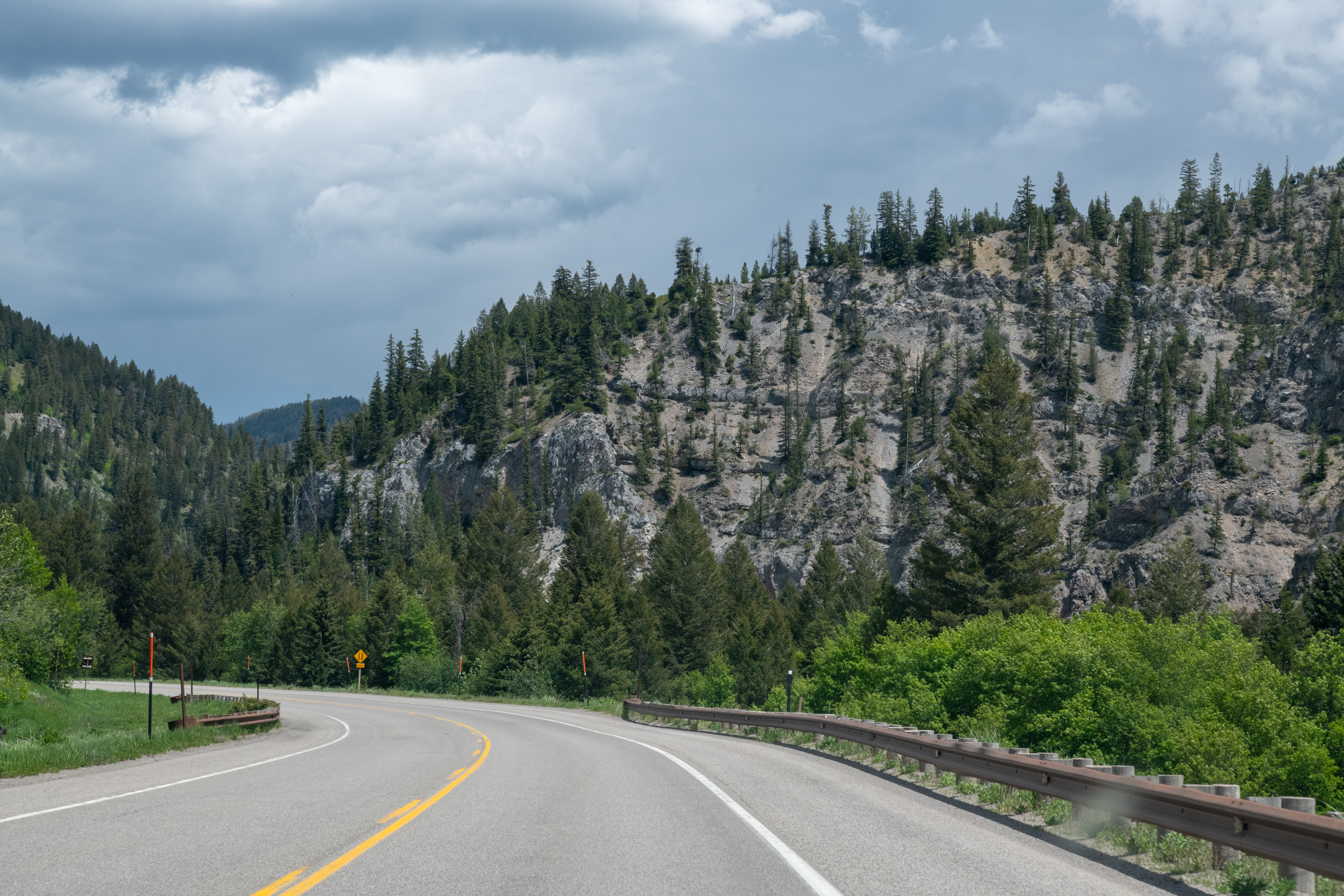
US 26/US 89 in the at Snake River Canyon.

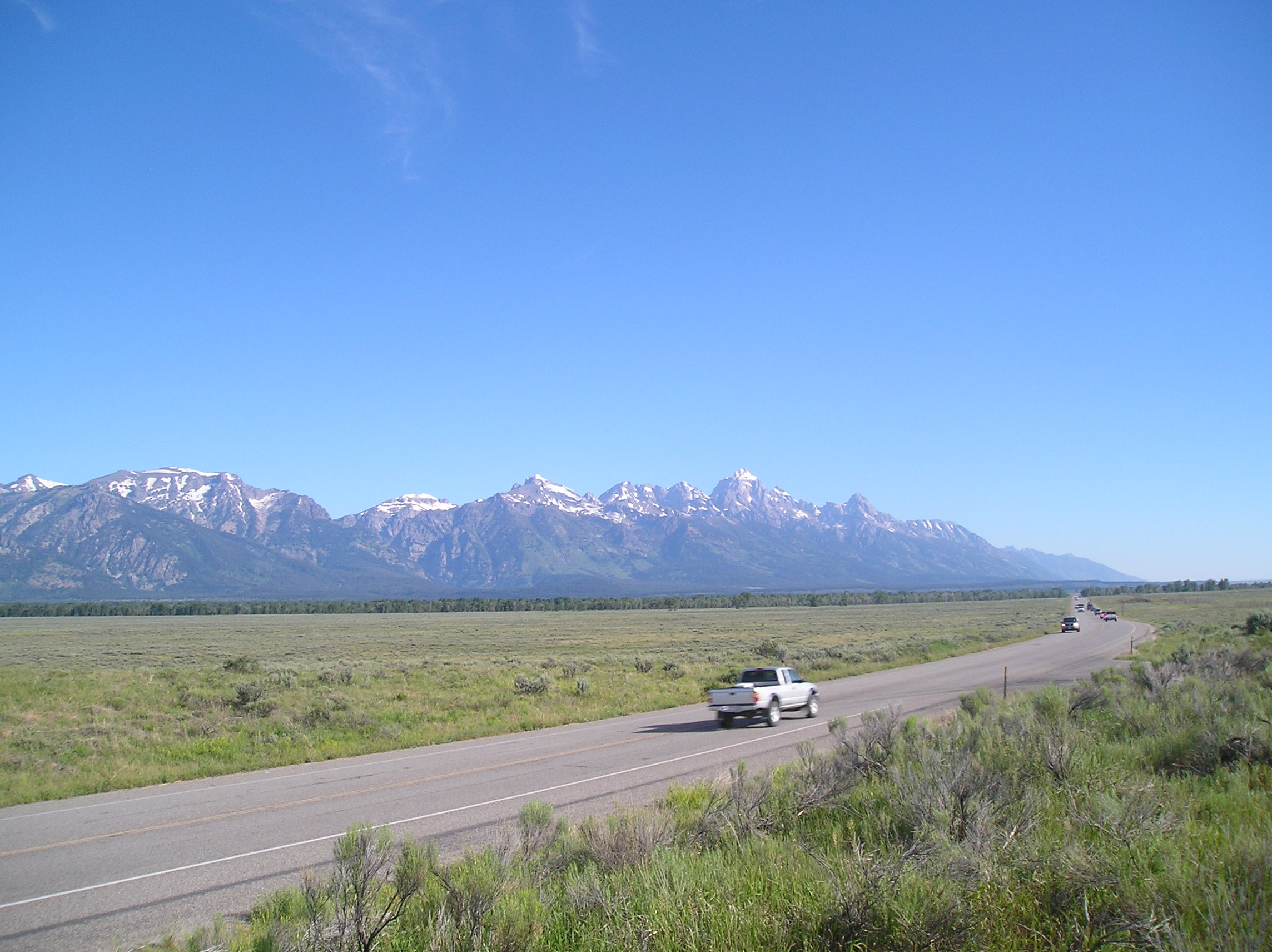
US 26/US 89/US 191 passing the Teton Range.

US 89 enters Wyoming in Lincoln County from Idaho and crosses Salt River Pass before passing through the Star Valley. At Alpine US 89 concludes a 62-mile (100 km) section where it is independent of another U.S. highway, the only such section in Wyoming. It begins its 66-mile (106 km) concurrency with US 26 and travels northeastward through the Snake River Canyon, crossing into Teton County. At Hoback Junction, the routes meet US 189, US 191 and the Wyoming Centennial Scenic Byway. The four routes cosigned for 14 miles (23 km), entering the Jackson Hole valley where US 189 terminates in Jackson.

North of Jackson, US 26, US 89, and US 191 enter Grand Teton National Park and continue their concurrency for 30 miles (48 km) to Moran; at Glacier View Turnout a view of Teton Glacier, on the north of Grand Teton, can be seen. At Moran, the routes meet US 287 where US 26, US 287 south, and the Wyoming Centennial Scenic Byway head east towards Dubois. US 89 and US 191 become concurrent with US 287 and the three routes pass unsigned through the Moran Entrance Station and along side Jackson Lake. Leaving Grand Teton National Park, the three routes travel 7 miles (11 km) through John D. Rockefeller Jr. Memorial Parkway before reaching the South Entrance of Yellowstone National Park. Officially US 89 and other U.S. Routes are officially discontinuous through the park, though some commercially produced maps show these highways running inside Yellowstone National Park itself along its unnumbered roads. US 89 resumes at the North Entrance at Gardiner, Montana.

== Major intersections ==
| County | Location | mi | km | Destinations | Notes |
|---|---|---|---|---|---|
| Lincoln | | 0.000 | 0.000 | US 89 south – Montpelier, Salt Lake | Continuation into Idaho; to SH-61 / WYO 89 |
| Lincoln | | 13.000 | 20.921 | Salt River Pass – elevation 7,625 ft (2,324 m) | |
| Lincoln | | 22.893 | 36.843 | WYO 241 north – Osmond | |
| Lincoln | | 22.893 | 36.843 | WYO 236 west – Fairview | |
| Lincoln | Afton | 39.030 | 62.813 | WYO 238 north (Nield Avenue) | |
| Lincoln | Grover | 34.015 | 54.742 | WYO 273 west / California National Historic Trail | |
| Lincoln | | 38.169 | 61.427 | WYO 238 south – Auburn | |
| Lincoln | | 41.539 | 66.851 | Star Valley Rest Area | |
| Lincoln | | 48.439 | 77.955 | WYO 239 west – Freedom | |
| Lincoln | Alpine | 62.371 | 100.376 | US 26 west – Idaho Falls | Southern end of US 26 concurrency |
| Teton | Hoback | 85.359 | 137.372 | US 189 south / US 191 south / Wyoming Centennial Scenic Byway – Pinedale | Western end of US 189 / US 191 / Wyoming Centennial Scenic Byway concurrency |
| Teton | Hoback | 89.299 | 143.713 | WYO 391 east (East Evans Road) | |
| Teton | Jackson | 97.094 | 156.258 | WYO 22 west – Wilson, Teton Village | |
| Teton | Jackson | 98.919 | 159.195 | US 189 ends / Broadway Avenue / Cache Street | Northern end of US 189 concurrency; US 189 northern terminus |
| Teton | Grand Teton National Park | 102.867 | 165.548 | Grand Teton National Park boundary | |
| Teton | Grand Teton National Park | 110.840 | 178.380 | Teton Park Road – Visitor Center | To Moose–Wilson Road |
| Teton | Grand Teton National Park | 128.630 | 207.010 | US 26 east / US 287 south / Wyoming Centennial Scenic Byway – Dubois | Northern end of US 26 / Wyoming Centennial Scenic Byway concurrency; southern end of US 287 concurrency |
| Teton | Grand Teton National Park | 132.642 | 213.467 | Moran Entrance Station | |
| Teton | Grand Teton National Park | 148.838 | 239.532 | Grand Teton National Park boundary | |
| Teton | John D. Rockefeller Jr. Memorial Parkway | No major junctions | | | |
| Teton | Yellowstone National Park | 155.610 | 250.430 | US 191 ends / US 287 ends | US 89 / US 191 / US 287 northern terminus; north end of US 191 / US 287 concurrency |
| Teton | Yellowstone National Park | 155.610 | 250.430 | Yellowstone National Park boundary (South Entrance) | |
| Teton | Yellowstone National Park | 155.610 | 250.430 | South Entrance Road (to US 89 north / US 191 north / US 287 north) | Continuation into Yellowstone National Park; US 89 resumes in Montana at the park's north entrance; US 191 / US 287 resume in Montana at the park's west entrance |
1.000 mi = 1.609 km; 1.000 km = 0.621 mi: Closed/former; Concurrency terminus; Tolled

== See also ==
U.S. Route 89
| Previous state: Idaho | Wyoming | Next state: Montana |
