= Snake River Canyon =

Snake River Canyon may refer to the following geographical areas on the Snake River in the western United States:

- Snake River Canyon (Idaho), near Twin Falls
- Snake River Canyon (Wyoming), near Jackson
- Hells Canyon, also known as Snake River Canyon, in North Central Idaho
