= Idaho State Highway 61 =

State highway Bear Lake County, Idaho, United States

State Highway 61
- SH-61 highlighted in red

Route information
- Maintained by ITD
- Length: 0.740 mi (1,191 m)
- Existed: by 1955–present

Major junctions
- South end: WYO 89 at Idaho-Wyoming State Line
- North end: US 89 east of Geneva

Location
- Country: United States
- State: Idaho
- Counties: Bear Lake

Highway system
- Idaho State Highway System; Interstate; US; State
← SH-60	→ SH-62

State Highway 61 (SH‑61) is a 0.74-mile (1.19 km) north-south state highway located in extreme eastern Bear Lake County, Idaho, United States, that connects Wyoming Highway 89 (WYO 89) at the Idaho-Wyoming state line with U.S. Route 89 in Idaho (US 89) east of Geneva.1 mile (1.6 km)

== Route description ==
SH‑61 begins at the Wyoming state line at the north end of WYO 89. SH‑61 only travels north about three-quarters mile (1,200 m) to end at US 89.

== Major intersections ==
The entire route is in Bear Lake County.

Location	mi	km	Destinations	Notes
	0.00	0.00	WYO 89 south – Cokeville, Kemmerer	Continuation into Wyoming
	0.74	1.19	US 89 – Montpelier, Afton, Jackson	Northern terminus
1.000 mi = 1.609 km; 1.000 km = 0.621 mi

== See also ==
- List of state highways in Idaho
