= Emigration Canyon =

Emigration Canyon is the name of two canyons in the American mountain west:

- Emigration Canyon, Idaho
- Emigration Canyon, Utah
