= Wyoming Highway 89 =

State highway in Wyoming, United States

Wyoming Highway 89
- WYO 89 highlighted in red

Route information
- Maintained by WYDOT
- Length: 55.84 mi (89.87 km)

Southern segment
- South end: I-80 / US 189 / WYO 150 in Evanston
- North end: SR-16 near Woodruff, UT

Northern segment
- South end: SR-30 near Sage Creek Junction, UT
- North end: SH-61 near Geneva, ID

Location
- Country: United States
- State: Wyoming
- Counties: Uinta, Lincoln

Highway system
- Wyoming State Highway System; Interstate; US; State
← US 89	→ I-90
← WYO 59	→ WYO 70

Wyoming Highway 89 (WYO 89) is a north-south state road that jumps in and out of Wyoming three times, and runs through the western edges of and Uinta County, Wyoming and Lincoln County, Wyoming.

Highway 89 leaves the state of Wyoming for approximately 17 miles (27 km), and becomes close to leaving the state two additional times. The portion in the state of Utah is known as Utah State Route 16 and Utah State Route 30. The only other routes that jump in and out of the state are U.S. Route 212 along the Beartooth Highway near Yellowstone National Park and Highway 230, which runs through the "Three Way Junction" of Colorado State Highways 125 and 127 south of the Snowy Range Mountains.

== Route description ==
Wyoming Highway 89 follows State Control Route 10 for its entire length.

=== Southern segment ===
Wyoming Highway 89 has two different segments to its route. The first starts at I-80 / US 189 (Exit 5) and Highway 150 in Evanston. (The roadway continues south of I-80/US 189 as WYO 150 to the Utah border). From Exit 5, WYO 89 heads north as Front Street into downtown Evanston. At 0.44 miles (0.71 km), Highway 89 turns north onto Highway 89 north. From here, WYO 89 runs concurrent for a short distance with I-80 Business/US 189 Business until it intersects Bear River Drive where the business routes turn east. As Highway 89 leaves Evanston behind the roadway heads northwest. The highway passes through the former coal mining camp of Almy and reaches the Town of Bear River just before reaching the Utah state line. Bear River is one of Wyoming's newest towns, being incorporated in 2001. Just after leaving Bear River, WYO 89 temporarily ends at Utah State Route 16.

=== Utah connection ===
The roadway continues as Utah SR 16. SR 16 intersects SR-39 in Woodruff, Utah at 10.51 miles (16.91 km) from its start at WYO 89. SR-16 ends at SR-30 in Sage Creek Junction, Utah at 29.36 miles (47.25 km). SR-30 'East' travels back to Wyoming State Line, where at 33.00 miles (53.11 km), SR-30 ends and WYO 89 resumes.

=== Northern segment ===
The northern segment of Wyoming Highway 89 begins at Utah State Route 30 at the Utah-Wyoming state line west of Sage, Wyoming. WYO 89 travels northeast to US 30 at Sage. Here, WYO 89 turns north to join US 30 as it heads north

WYO 89 runs concurrent with US 30 for almost 30 miles (48 km) from Sage through Cokeville, north to one-half mile east of the Idaho-Wyoming state line. This section is also known as the Emigrant Trail. At 36.11 miles (58.11 km), US 30/WYO 89 intersects WYO 231 (E. Main St.) and WYO 232 in the Town of Cokeville. From there WYO 89 continues with US 30 north. At 46.51 miles (74.85 km), WYO 89 ends its concurrency with US 30 near Border Junction.

Wyoming Highway 89 heads north from U.S. Route 30 as it continues westward. WYO 89 then travels north for approximately 10 miles (16 km), closely paralleling the Idaho-Wyoming state line until it finally crosses it and finally ends near Geneva, Idaho. The roadway continues as Idaho State Highway 61 for a very short length of 0.8 miles (1.3 km), until US 89 in Geneva, Idaho.

== History ==
According to an original network map of Wyoming State Highways, this route was defined as Wyoming Highway 65 in 1924. With the introduction of US routes in 1926, the route between Cokeville and Star Valley was renamed Highway 89, while the section south of Sage remained designated as Highway 65. This was done in the hopes that US 89 would be extended north into Wyoming. US 89 was extended in 1936 along old Highway 287. Highway 89 was recommissioned as Highway 91 to avoid confusion between the two highways, while Highway 65 kept its original number. However, within a few years, US 89 was rerouted to its current route in Utah and Idaho, and US 189 was created along old Highway 287. As a result, Wyoming recommissioned Highway 89 over both Highway 65 and Highway 91.

== Major intersections ==
County	Location	mi	km	Destinations	Notes
Uinta	Evanston	0.000	0.000	WYO 150 south – State Hospital, Wasatch National Forest I-80 / US 189 – Rock Springs, Salt Lake	Southern terminus; I-80 exit 5; highway continues as WYO 150
Uinta	Evanston	0.44	0.71	I-80 BL west / US 189 Bus. south (Front Street west) – Salt Lake	Southern end of concurrency with I-80 BL / US 189 Bus.
Uinta	Evanston	0.88	1.42	I-80 BL east / US 189 Bus. north (Bear River Drive) – Rock Springs	Northern end of concurrency with I-80 BL / US 189 Bus.
Wyoming–Utah line		12.58	20.25	SR-16 north	Continues 29 miles (47 km) to SR-30
Gap in route
Utah–Wyoming line		32.9 0.00	52.9 0.00	SR-30 west	Continues 2.9 miles (4.7 km) to SR-16 south
Lincoln	Sage	16.71	26.89	US 30 east – Kemmerer, Fossil Butte National Monument	Southern end of concurrency with US 30
Lincoln	Cokeville	36.11	58.11	WYO 231 (Main Street) – Cokeville; WYO 232	Eastern terminus of WYO 231; southern terminus of WYO 232
Lincoln		46.51	74.85	US 30 west – Pocatello	Northern end of concurrency with US 30
Wyoming–Idaho line		55.84	89.87	SH-61 north – Afton, Jackson	Continuation into Idaho
1.000 mi = 1.609 km; 1.000 km = 0.621 mi: Concurrency terminus; Route transition

- Mileage shown above asterisk indicates mileage in Utah via Utah State Route 16, Utah State Route 30

== See also ==
- List of state highways in Wyoming
- List of highways numbered 89
