= List of highways numbered 238 =

The following highways are numbered 238:

== Canada ==
- Manitoba Provincial Road 238
- Newfoundland and Labrador Route 238
- Prince Edward Island Route 238

== Costa Rica ==
- National Route 238

== Japan ==
- Japan National Route 238

== United Kingdom ==
- A238 road
- B238 road

== United States ==
- Interstate 238
- Arizona State Route 238
- Arkansas Highway 238
- California State Route 238
- Georgia State Route 238 (former)
- Indiana State Road 238 (former)
- Iowa Highway 238 (former)
- K-238 (Kansas highway)
- Maine State Route 238
- Maryland Route 238
- Minnesota State Highway 238
- Montana Secondary Highway 238
- New Mexico State Road 238
- New York State Route 238
- Ohio State Route 238
- Oregon Route 238
- Pennsylvania Route 238
- Rhode Island Route 238
- South Dakota Highway 238
- Tennessee State Route 238
- Texas State Highway 238
- Utah State Route 238 (former)
- Virginia State Route 238
- Wyoming Highway 238

Territories

- Puerto Rico Highway 238

Preceded by 237	Lists of highways 238	Succeeded by 239
