= List of highways numbered 240 =

Route 240 or Highway 240 may refer to:

== Australia ==
- Wimmera Highway

== Canada ==
- Manitoba Provincial Road 240
- Prince Edward Island Route 240
- Saskatchewan Highway 240

== Costa Rica ==
- National Route 240

== Japan ==
- Japan National Route 240

== United Kingdom ==
- A240 road
- B240 road

== United States ==
- Interstate 240
- U.S. Route 240 (former)
- California State Route 240 (former)
- Florida State Road 240 (former)
- Georgia State Route 240
- Hawaii Route 240
- Indiana State Road 240
- Kentucky Route 240
- Massachusetts Route 240
- Minnesota State Highway 240 (former)
- Missouri Route 240
- Montana Secondary Highway 240
- New Mexico State Road 240
- New York State Route 240
- Oregon Route 240
- Pennsylvania Route 240
- South Dakota Highway 240
- Tennessee State Route 240
- Texas State Highway 240
  - Texas State Highway Loop 240
  - Texas State Highway Spur 240
- Utah State Route 240
- Virginia State Route 240
- Washington State Route 240
- Wyoming Highway 240

Preceded by 239	Lists of highways 240	Succeeded by 241
