= List of highways numbered 236 =

The following highways are numbered 236:

== Canada ==
- Manitoba Provincial Road 236
- Newfoundland and Labrador Route 236
- Nova Scotia Route 236
- Prince Edward Island Route 236
- Quebec Route 236

== Costa Rica ==
- National Route 236

== Japan ==
- Japan National Route 236

== Nigeria ==
- A236 highway (Nigeria)

== United Kingdom ==
- A236 road
- B236 road

== United States ==
- California State Route 236
- Florida State Road 236 (former)
- Georgia State Route 236
- Indiana State Road 236
- K-236 (Kansas highway)
- Kentucky Route 236
- Maine State Route 236
- Maryland Route 236
- Massachusetts Route 236
- Minnesota State Highway 236 (former)
- Montana Secondary Highway 236
- New Hampshire Route 236
- New Mexico State Road 236
- New York State Route 236
- Ohio State Route 236
- Oregon Route 236 (former)
- Pennsylvania Route 236 (former)
- Tennessee State Route 236
- Texas State Highway 236
- Utah State Route 236 (former)
- Vermont Route 236
- Virginia State Route 236
- Wyoming Highway 236

Preceded by 235	Lists of highways 236	Succeeded by 237
