= List of highways numbered 235 =

Route 235 or Highway 235 may refer to:

== Canada ==
- Newfoundland and Labrador Route 235
- Prince Edward Island Route 235
- Quebec Route 235

== Costa Rica ==
- National Route 235

== Italy ==
- State road 235

== Japan ==
- Japan National Route 235

== Nigeria ==
- A235 highway (Nigeria)

== United Kingdom ==
- B235 road
- A235 road

== United States ==
- Interstate 235
- Alabama State Route 235
- Arkansas Highway 235
- California State Route 235 (unbuilt)
- Florida State Road 235
- Georgia State Route 235 (former)
- Indiana State Road 235
- Kentucky Route 235
- Maine State Route 235
- Maryland Route 235
- Minnesota State Highway 235
- Montana Secondary Highway 235 (former)
- New Mexico State Road 235
- New York State Route 235
- Ohio State Route 235
- Oregon Route 235 (former)
- Pennsylvania Route 235
- South Dakota Highway 235
- Tennessee State Route 235
- Texas Farm to Market Road 235
- Utah State Route 235
- Vermont Route 235
- Virginia State Route 235
- Wyoming Highway 235

Preceded by 234	Lists of highways 235	Succeeded by 236
