= Emigration Canyon, Idaho =

Coordinates: 42.370°N 111.531°W

Emigration Canyon is a canyon in Bear Lake County in the U.S. state of Idaho, roughly seventeen miles west of Montpelier. Carved by Emigration Creek, it is located in the Caribou-Targhee National Forest, with Highway 36 running along its floor.
