= Geneva, Idaho =

Unincorporated community in the state of Idaho, United States

Geneva
- Unincorporated community
- Location within the state of Idaho Geneva (the United States)
- Coordinates: 42°21′31″N 111°3′55″W
- Country: United States
- State: Idaho
- County: Bear Lake
- Elevation: 6,178 ft (1,883 m)
- Time zone: UTC-7 (Mountain (MST))
  - Summer (DST): UTC-6 (MDT)
- ZIP codes: 83238
- GNIS feature ID: 396540

Geneva is an unincorporated community in on the eastern edge of Bear Lake County, Idaho, United States, near the Wyoming border.

== Description ==
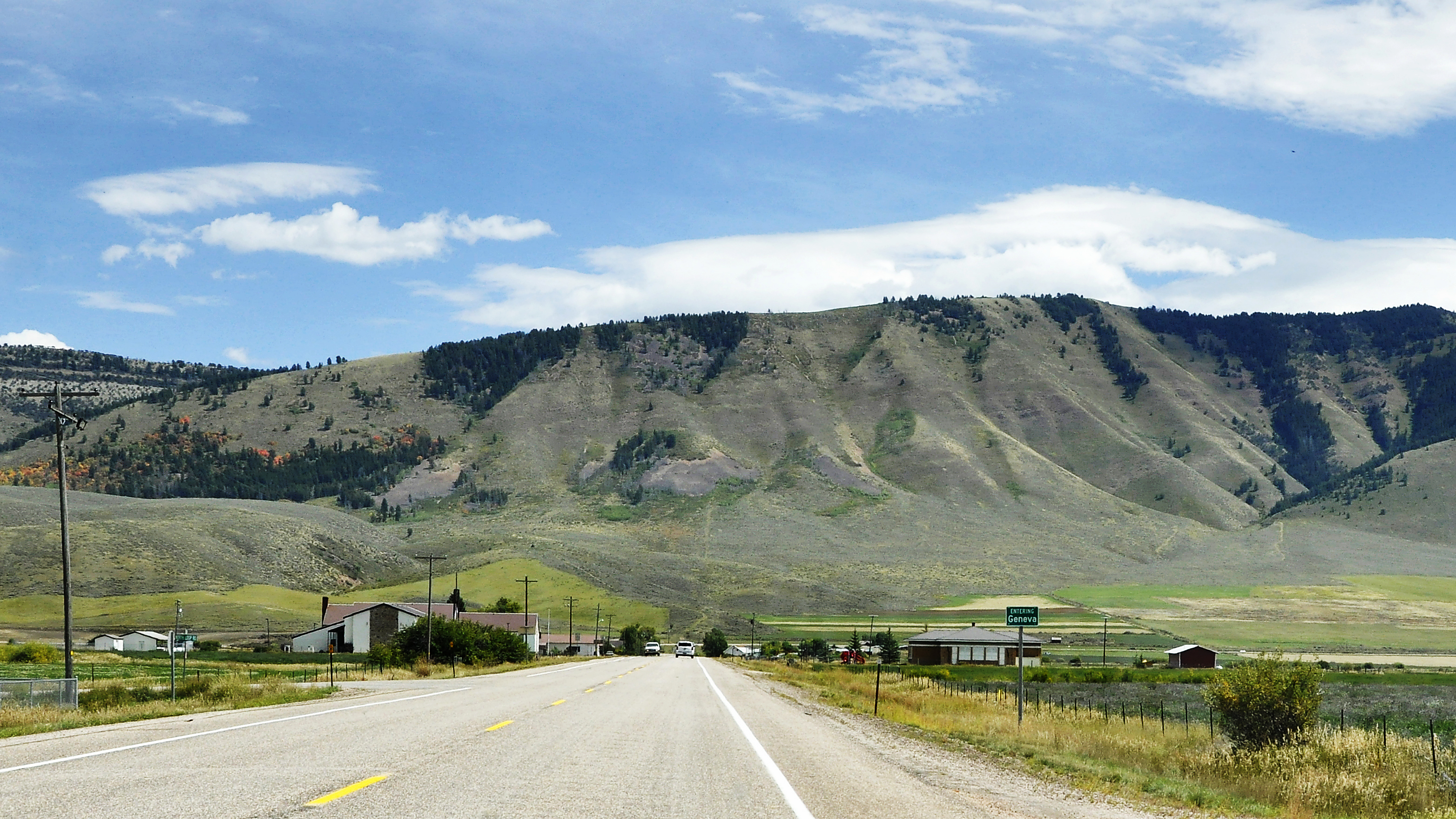
Looking east along U.S. Route 89 at Geneva, with the Sublette Range (of Wyoming) in the distance, September 2014

The community's elevation is 6,178 feet (1,883 m). Although Geneva is unincorporated, it has a post office, with the ZIP code of 83238; the ZCTA for ZIP Code 83238 had a population of 141 at the 2000 census.

U.S. Route 89 runs west 15 miles (24 km) to Montpelier and northeast 23 miles (37 km) to Smoot, Wyoming. Idaho State Highway 61 leads south briefly to connect with Wyoming Highway 89 and Border Junction, Wyoming, 13 miles (21 km) south. Geneva is located about 1 mile (1.6 km) west of the Idaho-Wyoming state line.

== History ==
A post office called Geneva has been in operation since 1898. The community was named after Geneva, in Switzerland, the native land of a large share of the first settlers. The Geneva Cemetery is located in the community.

Geneva's population was 165 in 1909, and was 10 in 1960.

== See also ==
- Charles C. Rich (1809 – 1883), an early leader in the Latter Day Saint movement and pioneer in Geneva and the Bear Lake area.
