= List of highways numbered 237 =

The following roads are numbered 237:

== Canada ==
- Manitoba Provincial Road 237
- Newfoundland and Labrador Route 237
- Prince Edward Island Route 237
- Quebec Route 237

== Costa Rica ==
- National Route 237

== Ireland ==
- R237 regional road

== Japan ==
- Japan National Route 237

== Nigeria ==
- A237 highway (Nigeria)

== United Kingdom ==
- A237 road
- B237 road

== United States ==
- Alabama State Route 237
- California State Route 237
- Florida State Road 237 (former)
- Georgia State Route 237
- Indiana State Road 237
- K-237 (Kansas highway)
- Kentucky Route 237
- Maine State Route 237
- Maryland Route 237
- Minnesota State Highway 237
- New Mexico State Road 237
- New York State Route 237
- Ohio State Route 237
- Oregon Route 237
- Pennsylvania Route 237 (former)
- Tennessee State Route 237
- Texas State Highway 237
  - Texas State Highway Loop 237 (former)
  - Texas State Highway Spur 237 (former)
  - Texas Farm to Market Road 237
- Utah State Route 237 (former)
- Virginia State Route 237
- Washington State Route 237 (former)
- Wyoming Highway 237

Preceded by 236	Lists of highways 237	Succeeded by 238
