= Sage, Wyoming =

- Ghost town
- Location within Wyoming Location within the United States
- Coordinates: 41°48′49″N 110°57′30″W
- Country: United States
- State: Wyoming
- County: Lincoln
- Elevation: 6,332 ft (1,930 m)
- Time zone: UTC–7 (Mountain (MST))
  - Summer (DST): UTC–6 (MDT)
- GNIS feature ID: 1597485

Sage is a ghost town in the far southwestern part of Lincoln County, Wyoming, United States. US Route 30 is the major road, which leads north 19 miles (31 km) to Cokeville and east 25 miles (40 km) to Kemmerer. Wyoming Highway 89 runs west 4 miles (6.4 km) to the Utah border, then another 5 miles (8.0 km) to Sage Creek Junction, Utah. The Union Pacific Railroad passes Sage in the direction of Rock Springs to the east and Pocatello, Idaho, to the west.

Sage lies at 6,332 feet (1,930 m) elevation, just west over the Sublette Mountains ridge from Fossil Butte National Monument in the Sage Creek valley.

The Overland Stage Route ran north through Sage from Fort Bridger.

== Climate ==
Climate data for Sage, Wyoming, 1991–2020 normals, 1923-2020 extremes: 6210ft (1893m)
| Month | Jan | Feb | Mar | Apr | May | Jun | Jul | Aug | Sep | Oct | Nov | Dec | Year |
|---|---|---|---|---|---|---|---|---|---|---|---|---|---|
| Record high °F (°C) | 55 (13) | 57 (14) | 70 (21) | 80 (27) | 86 (30) | 96 (36) | 104 (40) | 103 (39) | 92 (33) | 84 (29) | 74 (23) | 61 (16) | 104 (40) |
| Mean maximum °F (°C) | 41.7 (5.4) | 45.5 (7.5) | 59.5 (15.3) | 73.0 (22.8) | 79.7 (26.5) | 85.7 (29.8) | 90.6 (32.6) | 89.8 (32.1) | 84.8 (29.3) | 78.2 (25.7) | 59.1 (15.1) | 45.2 (7.3) | 91.5 (33.1) |
| Mean daily maximum °F (°C) | 25.9 (−3.4) | 29.9 (−1.2) | 43.1 (6.2) | 55.8 (13.2) | 66.0 (18.9) | 75.1 (23.9) | 84.8 (29.3) | 82.7 (28.2) | 73.7 (23.2) | 61.2 (16.2) | 43.2 (6.2) | 27.3 (−2.6) | 55.7 (13.2) |
| Daily mean °F (°C) | 12.0 (−11.1) | 16.0 (−8.9) | 29.4 (−1.4) | 39.9 (4.4) | 48.7 (9.3) | 56.4 (13.6) | 63.6 (17.6) | 61.3 (16.3) | 52.3 (11.3) | 41.3 (5.2) | 27.6 (−2.4) | 14.3 (−9.8) | 38.6 (3.7) |
| Mean daily minimum °F (°C) | −1.9 (−18.8) | 2.1 (−16.6) | 15.7 (−9.1) | 24.0 (−4.4) | 31.3 (−0.4) | 37.7 (3.2) | 42.4 (5.8) | 39.9 (4.4) | 30.9 (−0.6) | 21.5 (−5.8) | 12.1 (−11.1) | 1.3 (−17.1) | 21.4 (−5.9) |
| Mean minimum °F (°C) | −23.7 (−30.9) | −23.3 (−30.7) | −6.9 (−21.6) | 12.2 (−11.0) | 19.7 (−6.8) | 26.8 (−2.9) | 31.9 (−0.1) | 26.8 (−2.9) | 15.3 (−9.3) | 6.9 (−13.9) | −12.0 (−24.4) | −21.9 (−29.9) | −28.0 (−33.3) |
| Record low °F (°C) | −51 (−46) | −51 (−46) | −30 (−34) | −12 (−24) | 7 (−14) | 16 (−9) | 21 (−6) | 14 (−10) | 2 (−17) | −10 (−23) | −34 (−37) | −48 (−44) | −51 (−46) |
| Average precipitation inches (mm) | 0.53 (13) | 0.49 (12) | 0.49 (12) | 0.97 (25) | 1.32 (34) | 1.06 (27) | 0.97 (25) | 0.86 (22) | 1.14 (29) | 1.05 (27) | 0.56 (14) | 0.32 (8.1) | 9.76 (248.1) |
Source 1: NOAA
Source 2: XMACIS (precipitation, records & monthly max/mins)
