= Idaho State Highway 36 =

State highway in Idaho, United States

State Highway 36
- SH-36 highlighted in red

Route information
- Maintained by ITD
- Length: 73.313 mi (117.986 km)

Major junctions
- West end: I-15 near Malad City
- East end: US 89 in Ovid

Location
- Country: United States
- State: Idaho
- Counties: Oneida, Franklin, Bear Lake

Highway system
- Idaho State Highway System; Interstate; US; State
← SH-34	→ SH-37

State Highway 36 (SH-36) is a 73.313-mile-long (117.986 km) east-west state highway located in the southeast part of the U.S. state of Idaho. SH-36 runs from Interstate 15 (I-15) near Malad City to U.S. Route 89 (US-89) near Montpelier. The highway is maintained by the Idaho Transportation Department.

== Route description ==
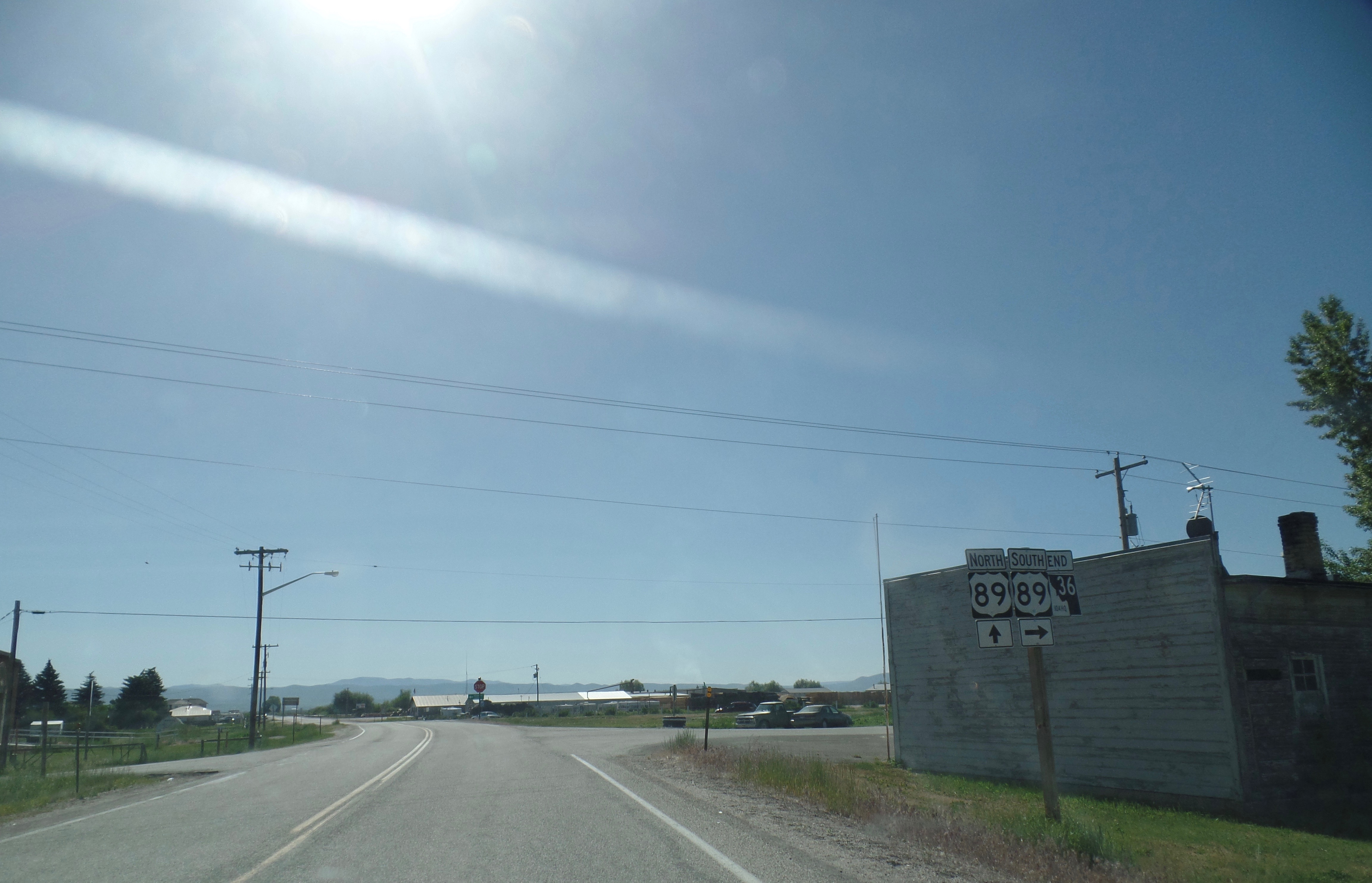
Eastern terminus of SH-36

SH-36 begins at a diamond interchange with I-15. As Deep Creek Road, the highway travels east before turning southeast, passing through the forest and just west of Old Baldy Peak before entering the town of Weston. There, SH-36 turns north, entering Dayton before turning east. Crossing the Bear River, the highway continues into the city of Preston, running concurrently with US-91 due north along State Street before turning northeast along a roadway with SH-34. After crossing the Bear River again, SH-36 continues northeast, passing through the community of Mink Creek before passing through fields and forests. SH-36 passes through Liberty before ending in the town of Ovid just west of Montpelier.

== Major intersections ==
County	Location	mi	km	Destinations	Notes
Oneida		0.000	0.000	I-15 – Malad, Salt Lake, Pocatello	I-15 exit 17; western terminus; road continues south as Deep Creek Road
Franklin	Preston	33.075	53.229	US 91 south (State Street south) – Franklin, Logan	Western end of concurrency with US 91
Franklin	Preston	33.905	54.565	US 91 north – Pocatello SH-34 begins	Eastern end of concurrency with US 91; western end of concurrency with SH-34; US 91 north serves Preston Airport
Franklin		39.387	63.387	SH-34 north – Grace, Soda Springs	Eastern end of concurrency with SH-34
Bear Lake	Ovid	73.313	117.986	US 89 – Montpelier, Jackson, Paris	Eastern terminus; highway continues as US 89 north
1.000 mi = 1.609 km; 1.000 km = 0.621 mi: Concurrency terminus

== See also ==
- List of state highways in Idaho
- List of highways numbered 36
