= Wyoming Highway 237 =

State highway in Wyoming, United States

Wyoming Highway 237
- WYO 237 highlighted in red

Route information
- Maintained by WYDOT
- Length: 3.42 mi (5.50 km)

Major junctions
- West end: W. 1st N St/S. 1st W St in Auburn
- East end: US 89 in Grover

Location
- Country: United States
- State: Wyoming
- Counties: Lincoln

Highway system
- Wyoming State Highway System; Interstate; US; State
← WYO 236	→ WYO 238

Wyoming Highway 237 (WYO 237) is a 3.42-mile-long (5.50 km) state road in Lincoln County, Wyoming that connects U.S. Route 89 (US 89) at Grover to WYO 238 and the community of Auburn.

== Route description ==
Wyoming Highway 237 begins its western end at the intersection of W. 1st N St and S 1st W St in Auburn. WYO 237 travels east from there, intersecting Wyoming Highway 238 just 0.15 miles later. Past WYO 238, Highway 237 proceeds due east until it reaches its eastern end at US 89 in Grover at 3.42 miles. The roadway continues northeast of Grover as Forest Service Road 10081 into Bridger-Teton National Forest and Turnerville.

== Major intersections ==
The entire route is in Lincoln County.

Location	mi	km	Destinations	Notes
Auburn	0.00	0.00	W. 1st N Street/S. 1st W Street	Western Terminus of WYO 237
Auburn	0.15	0.24	WYO 238	
Grover	3.42	5.50	US 89	Eastern Terminus of WYO 237
1.000 mi = 1.609 km; 1.000 km = 0.621 mi
