= List of highways numbered 230 =

Route 230, or Highway 230, may refer to:

== Argentina ==
- Route 230

== Brazil ==
- BR-230 (Trans-Amazonian Highway)

== Canada ==
- Manitoba Provincial Road 230
- Newfoundland and Labrador Route 230
- Prince Edward Island Route 230

== Costa Rica ==
- National Route 230

== India ==
- National Highway 230 (India)

== Japan ==
- Japan National Route 230

== United Kingdom ==
- A230 road
- B230 road

== United States ==
- U.S. Route 230 (former)
- California State Route 230
- Florida State Road 230
- Georgia State Route 230
- Kentucky Route 230
- Maine State Route 230
- Montana Secondary Highway 230 (former)
- Nevada State Route 230
- New Mexico State Road 230
- New York State Route 230
- Ohio State Route 230 (former)
- Oregon Route 230
- Pennsylvania Route 230
- South Carolina Highway 230
- South Dakota Highway 230
- Tennessee State Route 230
- Texas State Highway 230
  - Texas State Highway Loop 230
  - Farm to Market Road 230 in Texas
- Utah State Route 230 (former)
- Virginia State Route 230
- Washington State Route 230
- West Virginia Route 230
- Wyoming Highway 230

Preceded by 229	Lists of highways 230	Succeeded by 231
