= List of highways numbered 233 =

The following highways are numbered 233:

== Canada ==
- Manitoba Provincial Road 233
- Newfoundland and Labrador Route 233
- Prince Edward Island Route 233
- Quebec Route 233

== Costa Rica ==
- National Route 233

== Ireland ==
- R233 regional road

== Japan ==
- Japan National Route 233

== Nigeria ==
- A233 highway (Nigeria)

== United Kingdom ==
- A233 road

== United States ==
- Alabama State Route 233
- Arkansas Highway 233
- California State Route 233
- Colorado State Highway 233
- Georgia State Route 233
- K-233 (Kansas highway)
- Kentucky Route 233
- Maine State Route 233
- Montana Secondary Highway 233
- Nevada State Route 233
- New Mexico State Road 233
- New York State Route 233
- Ohio State Route 233
- Oregon Route 233
- Pennsylvania Route 233
- Tennessee State Route 233
- Texas State Highway 233 (former)
  - Texas State Highway Spur 233
- Utah State Route 233 (former)
- Virginia State Route 233
- Wyoming Highway 233

Preceded by 232	Lists of highways 233	Succeeded by 234
