= Ovid, Idaho =

Unincorporated community in Bear Lake County, Idaho, United States

Ovid
- Unincorporated community
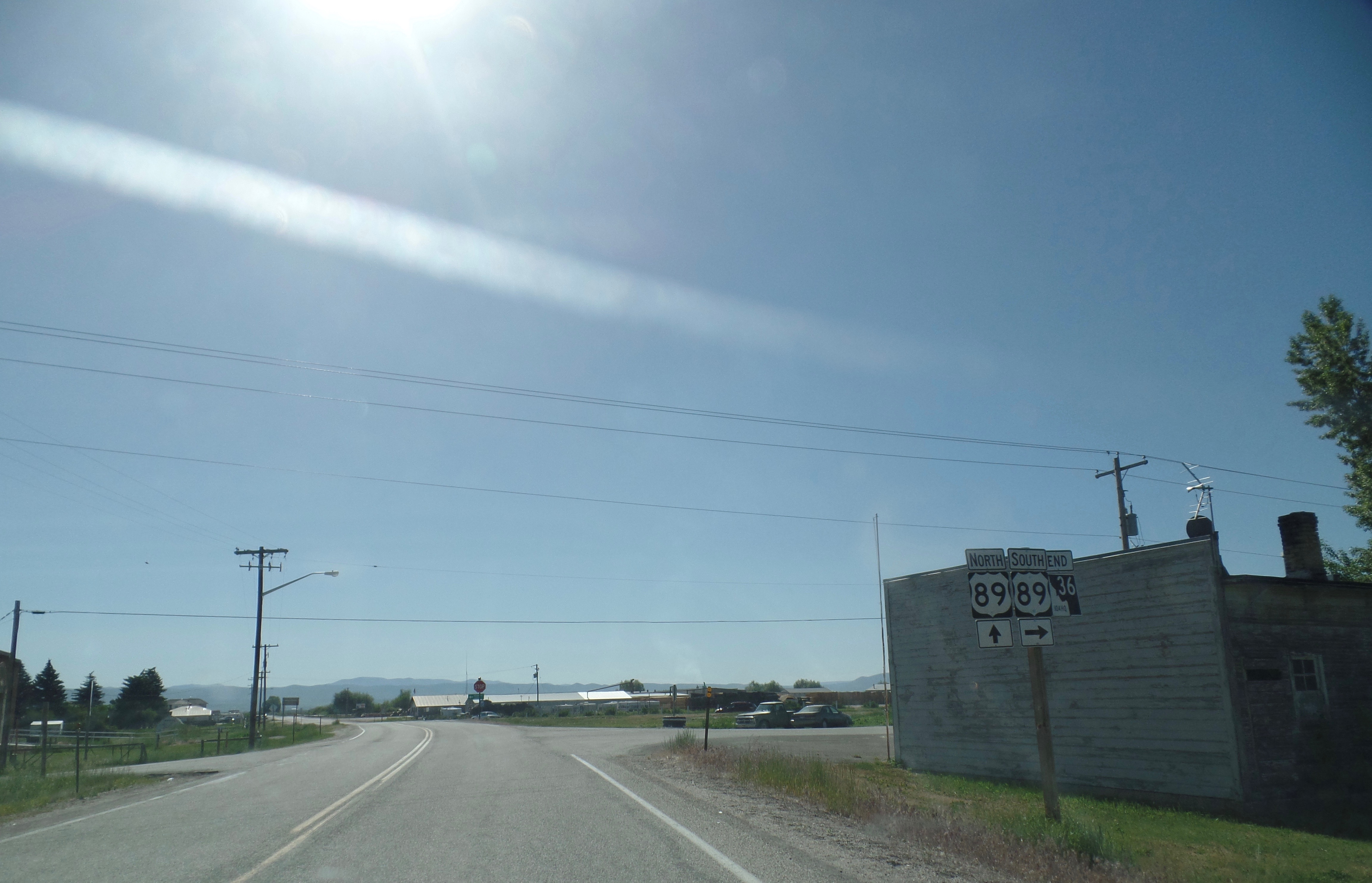
- End of Idaho State Highway 36 at its junction with U.S. Route 89 in Ovid, June 2016

- Location within the state of Idaho
- Coordinates: 42°17′20″N 111°23′54″W
- Country: United States
- State: Idaho
- County: Bear Lake
- Elevation: 5,938 ft (1,810 m)
- Time zone: UTC-7 (Mountain (MST))
  - Summer (DST): UTC-6 (MDT)
- GNIS feature ID: 396995

Ovid is an unincorporated community in Bear Lake County, Idaho, United States. It was first settled in 1864.

Ovid lies at the junction of U.S. Route 89 and the eastern terminus of Idaho State Highway 36.
