= John A. Bagley House =

Historic house in Idaho, United States

- U.S. National Register of Historic Places
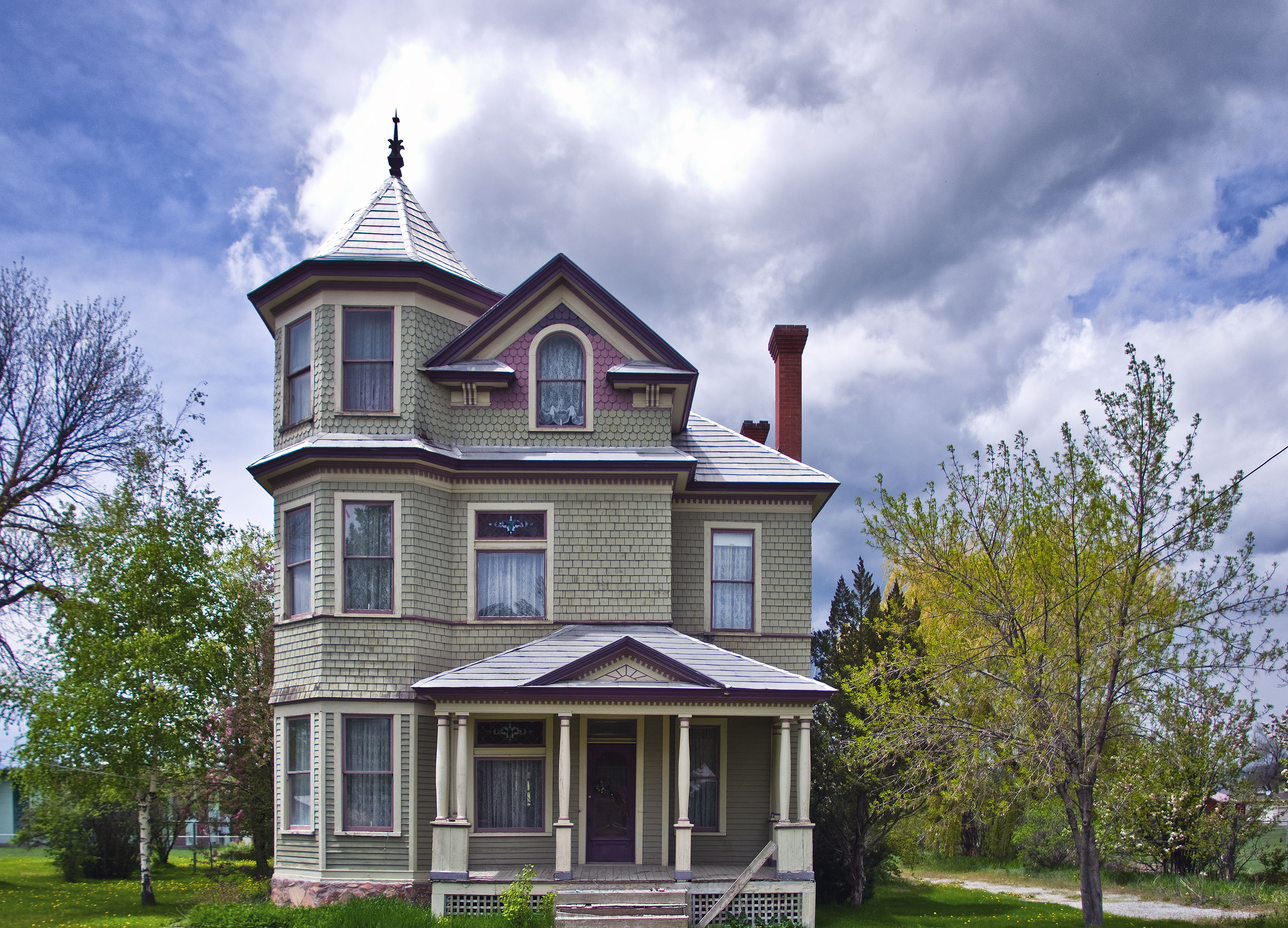

- Location within Idaho Location within the United States
- Location: 155 N. 5th St., Montpelier, Idaho
- Coordinates: 42°19′30″N 111°18′1″W
- Area: less than one acre
- Built: 1902
- Architectural style: Queen Anne
- NRHP reference No.: 78001046
- Added to NRHP: January 20, 1978

The John A. Bagley House, located at 155 N. 5th St. in Montpelier in Bear Lake County, Idaho, is a Queen Anne-style house built in 1902. It was listed on the National Register of Historic Places in 1978.

It is a three-story house with a pedimented porch. It has an octagonal corner tower and a hipped roof with abbreviated gables.

A third-floor room is decorated by murals by Joseph Phelps, an artist who became accomplished at a young age.
