= List of highways numbered 234 =

The following highways are numbered 234:

== Australia ==
Borung Highway

== Canada ==
- Manitoba Provincial Road 234
- Newfoundland and Labrador Route 234
- Prince Edward Island Route 234
- Quebec Route 234

== Costa Rica ==
- National Route 234

== India ==
- National Highway 234 (India)

== Ireland ==
- R234 regional road

== Italy ==
- Strada statale 234 Codognese

== Japan ==
- Japan National Route 234

== Nigeria ==
- A234 highway (Nigeria)

== United Kingdom ==
- A234 road
- B234 road

== United States ==
- California State Route 234 (unbuilt)
- Florida State Road 234 (former)
- Georgia State Route 234
- Indiana State Road 234
- K-234 (Kansas highway)
- Kentucky Route 234
- Maine State Route 234
- Maryland Route 234
- Montana Secondary Highway 234
- New Mexico State Road 234
- New York State Route 234 (former)
- Oregon Route 234
- Pennsylvania Route 234
- Tennessee State Route 234
- Texas State Highway 234
  - Texas State Highway Loop 234
- Utah State Route 234 (former)
- Virginia State Route 234
- Wyoming Highway 234

Preceded by 233	Lists of highways 234	Succeeded by 235
