= Merlo J. Pusey =

American journalist (1902–1985)

Merlo John Pusey (February 3, 1902 in Woodruff, Utah – November 22, 1985 in Washington, D.C.) was an American biographer and editorial writer. He won the 1952 Pulitzer Prize for Biography or Autobiography and the 1952 Bancroft Prize for his 1951 biography of U.S. Chief Justice Charles Evans Hughes.

Born and raised on a farm near Woodruff, Utah, Pusey was a Latter-day Saint. He attended the Latter-day Saints University—now Ensign College—and graduated as a member of Phi Beta Kappa from the University of Utah after working on the college newspaper. He later became a reporter and assistant city editor at The Deseret News in Salt Lake City.

Pusey worked for The Washington Post from 1928 to 1971, becoming associate editor in 1946, continuing to contribute occasional pieces until about two years before his death.

Between 1931 and 1933, Pusey was a part-time member of the staff of the U.S. Senate Finance Committee. From 1939 until 1942, he was an instructor in journalism at George Washington University.

His interest in Roosevelt's "court packing plan" led directly to his biography of Hughes, who was chief justice at the time, and who gave him a number of interviews and full access to his private papers. Other books include Big Government: Can We Control It? (1945), Eisenhower the President (1956), The USA Astride the World (1971), and Eugene Meyer (1974), a biography of the financier and public official who bought The Washington Post at a bankruptcy sale in June 1933.

In later years, Pusey lived on a farm in Dickerson, Maryland. He was a member of the American Political Science Association, the Cosmos Club, and the National Press Club. After publishing Ripples of Intuition, a book of poetry, in 1984, he died of cancer in 1985.

== Books ==
- The Supreme Court Crisis (Macmillan, 1937)
- Big Government: Can We Control It? (Harper, 1945)
- Charles Evans Hughes (2 vols., Macmillan, 1951). Pulitzer Prize for Biography or Autobiography
- Eisenhower, the President (Macmillan, 1956)
- The Way We Go to War (Houghton Mifflin, 1969)
- The USA Astride the Globe (Houghton Mifflin, 1971)
- Eugene Meyer (Knopf, 1974)
- Builders of the Kingdom, George A. Smith, John Henry Smith, George Albert Smith (Brigham Young University, c1981)
- Ripples of Intuition (Eden Hill, 1984; Signature Books, Inc., 1986).
