= List of highways numbered 228 =

The following highways are numbered 228:

== Canada ==
- Prince Edward Island Route 228
- Quebec Route 228

== Costa Rica ==
- National Route 228

== Japan ==
- Japan National Route 228

== United Kingdom ==
- A228 road
- B228 road

== United States ==
- Arkansas Highway 228
- California State Route 228 (former)
- Florida State Road 228
  - Florida State Road 228A
- Georgia State Route 228
- K-228 (Kansas highway)
- Kentucky Route 228
- Maine State Route 228
- Maryland Route 228
- Massachusetts Route 228
- Minnesota State Highway 228
- Montana Secondary Highway 228
- Nevada State Route 228
- New Mexico State Road 228
- New York State Route 228
- Ohio State Route 228
- Oregon Route 228
- Pennsylvania Route 228
- Tennessee State Route 228
- Texas State Highway 228 (former)
  - Texas State Highway Spur 228
- Utah State Route 228
- Virginia State Route 228

Preceded by 227	Lists of highways 228	Succeeded by 229
