= Montpelier Odd Fellows Hall =

- U.S. National Register of Historic Places
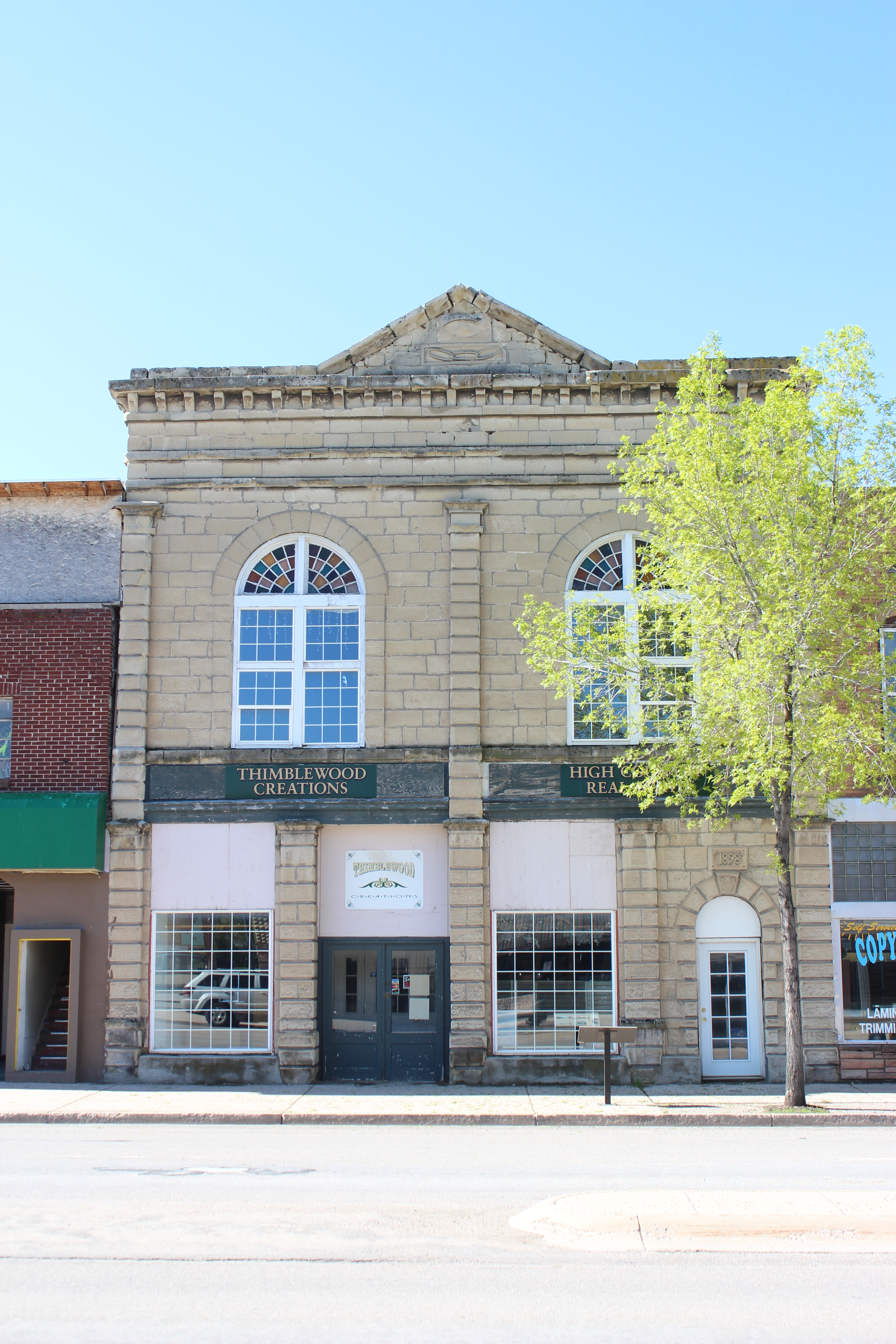

- Location within Idaho Location within the United States
- Location: 843 Washington St., Montpelier, Idaho
- Coordinates: 42°19′2″N 111°18′27″W
- Area: less than one acre
- Built: 1898-99
- Architectural style: Renaissance
- NRHP reference No.: 78001048
- Added to NRHP: April 15, 1978

The Montpelier Odd Fellows Hall is an Independent Order of Odd Fellows meeting hall located at 843 Washington St. in Montpelier, Idaho. The Renaissance Revival building was constructed in 1898–99. The stone building features round arch windows with fanlights on its second story. A pediment with the Odd Fellows' symbols projects above the building's cornice. As of 1978, the Odd Fellows still met in the building.

The building was listed on the National Register of Historic Places in 1978.
