= Wyoming Highway 232 =

State highway in Lincoln County, Wyoming, United States

Wyoming Highway 232
- Smith Forks Road
- WYO 232 highlighted in red

Route information
- Maintained by WYDOT
- Length: 12.22 mi (19.67 km)

Major junctions
- South end: US 30 / WYO 89; WYO 231 in Cokeville
- North end: Smiths Fork Road

Location
- Country: United States
- State: Wyoming
- Counties: Lincoln

Highway system
- Wyoming State Highway System; Interstate; US; State
← WYO 231	→ WYO 233

Wyoming Highway 232 (WYO 232) is a 12.22-mile-long (19.67 km) state highway in southeastern Lincoln County, Wyoming, United States, that serves the town of Cokeville and outlying areas to the northeast.

== Route description ==
WYO 232, locally named Smith Forks Road, travels from an intersection with US Route 30/Wyoming Highway 89 and Wyoming Highway 231 in Cokeville northeast to the Button Flat. WYO 232 heads north toward the Commissary Ridge of the Bridger-Teton National Forest. The Cokeville city limits are at Milepost 0.09, and Highway 232 ends at Milepost 12.22 with local roadways near the National Forest.

== Major intersections ==
The entire route is in Lincoln County.

Location	mi	km	Destinations	Notes
Cokeville	0.00	0.00	US 30 / WYO 89 WYO 231 west (Main Street)	Southern terminus
	12.22	19.67	Smiths Fork Road in Button Flat	Northern terminus
1.000 mi = 1.609 km; 1.000 km = 0.621 mi

== See also ==
- List of state highways in Wyoming
- List of highways numbered 232
