= Glencoe, Idaho =

Unincorporated community in the state of Idaho, United States

Glencoe
- Unincorporated community
- Location within the state of Idaho
- Coordinates: 42°0′39.75″N 111°24′29.75″W
- Country: United States
- State: Idaho
- County: Bear Lake
- Elevation: 5,975 ft (1,821 m)
- Time zone: UTC-7 (Mountain (MST))
  - Summer (DST): UTC-6 (MDT)
- ZIP code: 83287
- Area codes: 208, 986

Glencoe, is an unincorporated community along the shores of Bear Lake in Bear Lake County, Idaho, United States. It is 3/4 mile (1.2 km) north of the Utah border along US 89.
