= Montpelier Historic District (Montpelier, Idaho) =

Historic district in Idaho, United States

- U.S. National Register of Historic Places
- U.S. Historic district
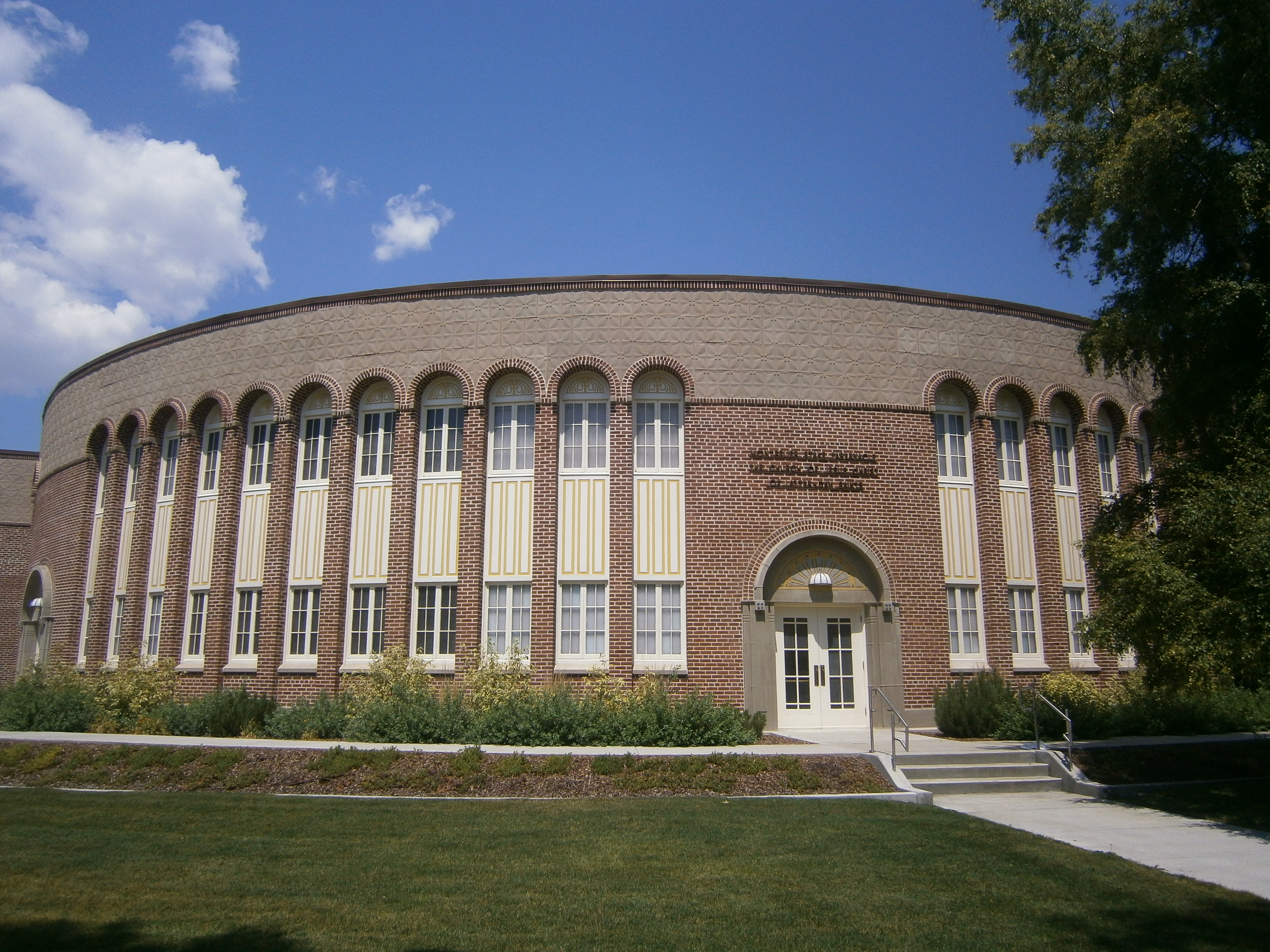
- Montpelier Stake Tabernacle, built in 1919

- Location within Idaho Location within the United States
- Location: Washington Ave. and 6th St., Montpelier, Idaho
- Coordinates: 42°19′03″N 111°18′10″W
- Area: 4.9 acres (2.0 ha)
- Built: 1916
- Architect: Multiple
- Architectural style: Classical Revival, Moderne
- NRHP reference No.: 78001047
- Added to NRHP: November 16, 1978

The Montpelier Historic District in Montpelier in southeast Idaho is a 4.9 acres (2.0 ha) historic district which was listed on the National Register of Historic Places im 1978.

It includes four buildings: the city hall, a high school, the high school's gymnasium, and the Church of Jesus Christ of Latter-Day Saints' Montpelier Stake Tabernacle. The Stake Tabernacle was only one of three in world at the time of its construction.
