= List of highways numbered 232 =

The following highways are numbered 232:

== Canada ==
- Manitoba Provincial Road 232
- Newfoundland and Labrador Route 232
- Prince Edward Island Route 232
- Quebec Route 232

== Costa Rica ==
- National Route 232

== Cuba ==
- Las Ovas–Alonso Rojas Road (1–232)

== Hungary ==
Route 232 (Hungary)

== Ireland ==
- R232 regional road

== Israel ==
- Van Esveld, Bill (March 25, 2009). "Rain of Fire: Israel's Unlawful Use of White Phosphorus in Gaza". Human Rights Watch.

== Japan ==
- Japan National Route 232

== Nigeria ==
- A232 highway (Nigeria)

== United Kingdom ==
- A232 road
- B232 road

== United States ==
- California State Route 232
- Georgia State Route 232
- Hawaii Route 232 (former)
- Indiana State Road 232
- K-232 (Kansas highway)
- Maine State Route 232
- Minnesota State Highway 232 (former)
- Montana Secondary Highway 232
- Nevada State Route 232
- New York State Route 232
- Ohio State Route 232
- Oregon Route 232 (former)
- Pennsylvania Route 232
- South Dakota Highway 232 (former)
- Tennessee State Route 232
- Texas State Highway Loop 232
- Utah State Route 232
- Vermont Route 232
- Virginia State Route 232
- Washington State Route 232 (former)
- Wyoming Highway 232

Preceded by 231	Lists of highways 232	Succeeded by 233
