= Wyoming Highway 238 =

State highway in Wyoming, United States

Wyoming Highway 238
- WYO 238 highlighted in red

Route information
- Maintained by WYDOT
- Length: 12.08 mi (19.44 km)

Major junctions
- South end: US 89 in Auburn
- North end: US 89 south of Bedford

Location
- Country: United States
- State: Wyoming
- Counties: Lincoln

Highway system
- Wyoming State Highway System; Interstate; US; State
← WYO 237	→ WYO 239

Wyoming Highway 238 (WYO 238) is a 12.08-mile-long (19.44 km) Wyoming state road located in north-central Lincoln County, Wyoming.

== Route description ==
Wyoming Highway 238 begins its southern end at U.S. Route 89 (Washington Street) in Afton. WYO 238 travels west, passing north of the Afton Municipal Airport, as this stretch of WYO 238 runs east–west. After leaving Afton WYO 238 turns north, at approximately 3.2 miles. Now due north, Highway 238 reaches Wyoming Highway 237 in Auburn at just over 8 miles. Highway 237 provides access between US 89 and Auburn. WYO 238 continues northward before gently turning northeasterly and intersecting US 89 at its northern terminus south of Bedford.

== Major intersections ==
The entire route is in Lincoln County.

Location	mi	km	Destinations	Notes
Afton	0.00	0.00	US 89	
Auburn	8.23	13.24	WYO 237	
	12.08	19.44	US 89	
1.000 mi = 1.609 km; 1.000 km = 0.621 mi
