= U.S. Route 241 =

U.S. Route 241 may refer to:

- U.S. Route 241 (Tennessee–Kentucky) in Tennessee and Kentucky
- U.S. Route 241 (Alabama–Tennessee) in Alabama and Tennessee
