= Sublette Mountain =

Mountain in Wyoming, United States

- Location within Wyoming

Highest point
- Elevation: 9,291 ft (2,832 m)
- Coordinates: 42°15′16″N 111°00′13″W

Geography
- Parent range: Sublette Mountains

Sublette Mountain is a mountain summit in Lincoln County, Wyoming, 9,291 feet (2,832 m) in elevation. It is the tallest peak of the Sublette Range, which are part of the Southern Wyoming Overthrust Belt. Sublette Mountain is near the Bear Lake County, Idaho, border.
