= Wyoming Highway 241 =

State highway in Wyoming, United States

Wyoming Highway 241
- WYO 241 highlighted in red

Route information
- Maintained by WYDOT
- Length: 4.27 mi (6.87 km)

Major junctions
- South end: US 89 in Smoot
- North end: WYO 236 in Afton

Location
- Country: United States
- State: Wyoming
- Counties: Lincoln

Highway system
- Wyoming State Highway System; Interstate; US; State
← WYO 240	→ WYO 251

Wyoming Highway 241 (WYO 241) is a 4.27-mile-long (6.87 km) state road in Lincoln County, Wyoming that parallels U.S. Route 89 (US 89) for a short distance just south of Afton.

== Route description ==
Wyoming Highway 241 begins its southern end at US Route 89 in Smoot and from there parallels US 89 which lies east of Highway 241. WYO 241 heads north 4.27 miles and ends at Wyoming Highway 236 near its east end with US 89; located just south of Afton.

== Major intersections ==
The entire route is in Lincoln County.

Location	mi	km	Destinations	Notes
Smoot	0.00	0.00	US 89	Southern Terminus of WYO 241
Afton	4.27	6.87	WYO 236	Northern Terminus of WYO 241
1.000 mi = 1.609 km; 1.000 km = 0.621 mi
