= Snake River Canyon (Wyoming) =

Canyon in western Wyoming south of Jackson Hole

Snake River Canyon/Grand Canyon
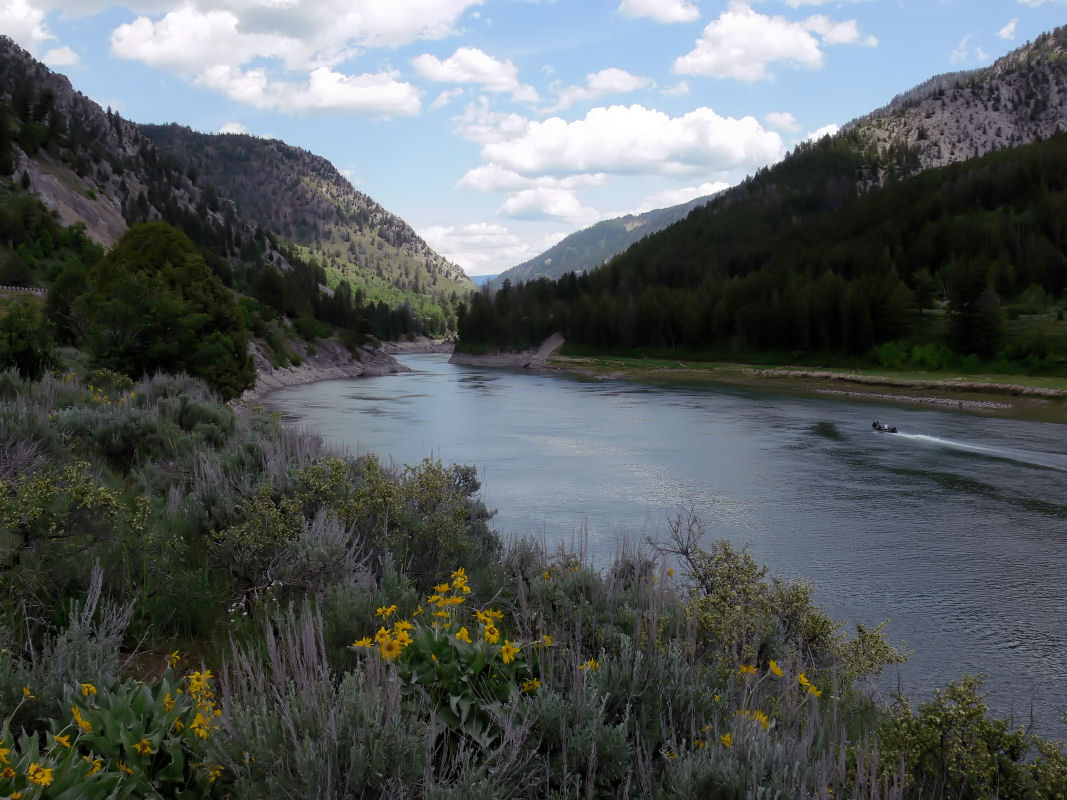
- Snake River near Alpine, Wyoming

Geography
- Country: United States
- State: Wyoming
- County: Lincoln
- Coordinates: 43°10′28″N 111°00′04″W
- Interactive map of Snake River Canyon/Grand Canyon

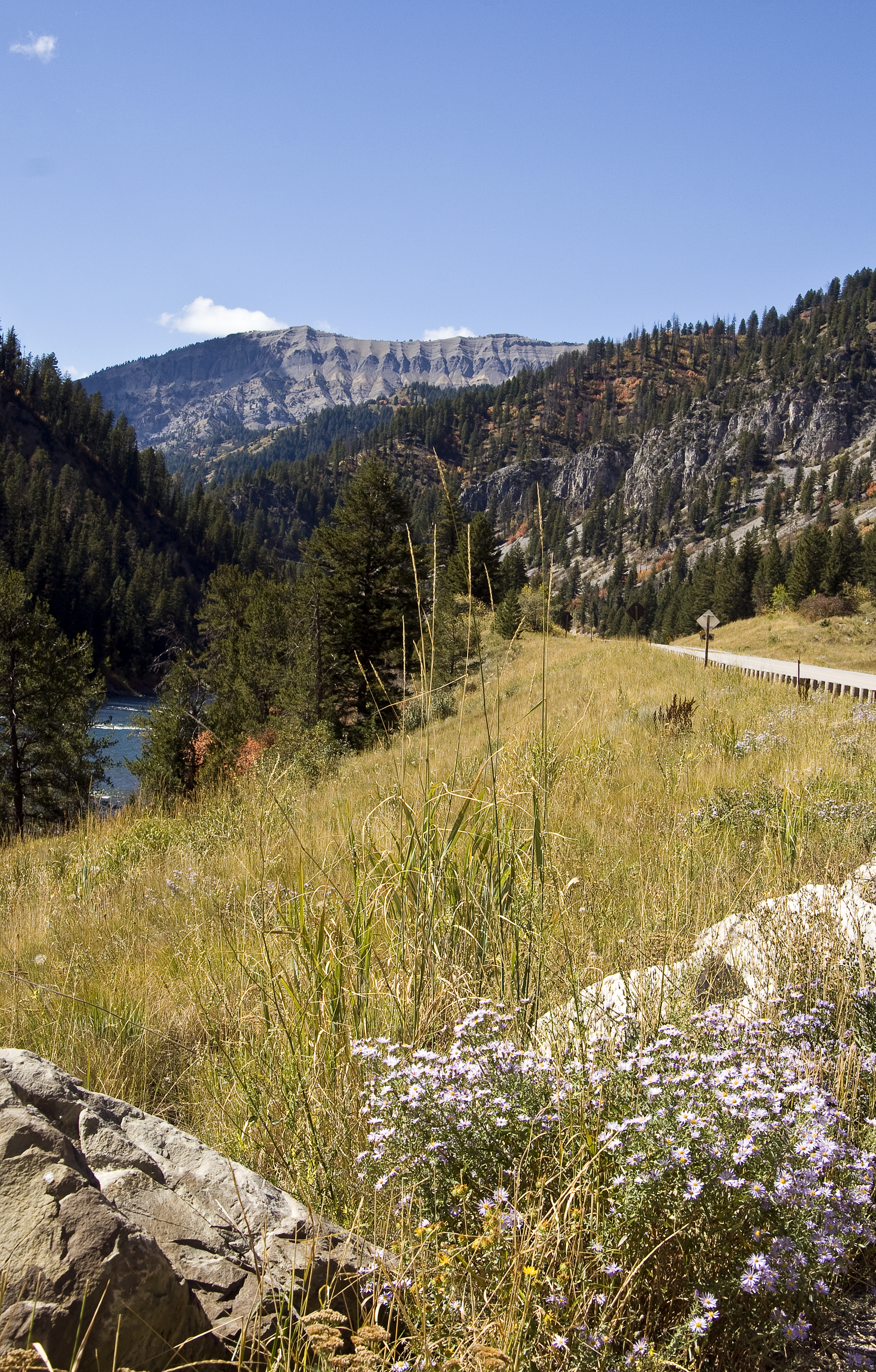
The Snake River Canyon along US 26/US 89 near Hoback Junction, Wyoming

The Snake River Canyon (also known as the Grand Canyon) is formed by the Snake River in western Wyoming, United States, south of Jackson Hole.

At the southern end of this canyon is the town of Alpine, Wyoming where the Snake River meets the Greys River and the Salt River at Palisades Reservoir on the Wyoming-Idaho border. It is a popular destination for rafting trips and is known for having some of the best white-water rafting in the United States. Running through the canyon is US 89.

== Geology ==
The Snake River cuts through a fold and thrust belt on its way from Hoback, Wyoming to Alpine, Wyoming. The North American Plate has pushed against the Farallon Plate to create many geologic features including the folds and thrusts visible in the Snake River Canyon in Wyoming.

Fold and thrust in the Snake River Canyon
