= Wyoming Highway 236 =

State highway in Wyoming, United States

Wyoming Highway 236
- WYO 236 highlighted in red

Route information
- Maintained by WYDOT
- Length: 2.6 mi (4.2 km)

Major junctions
- West end: CR 140 / CR 142 in Fairview
- WYO 241 in Afton
- East end: US 89 in Afton

Location
- Country: United States
- State: Wyoming
- Counties: Lincoln

Highway system
- Wyoming State Highway System; Interstate; US; State
← WYO 235	→ WYO 237

Wyoming Highway 236 (WYO 236) is a 2.6-mile-long (4.2 km) state road in Lincoln County, Wyoming that acts as a spur to Fairview, located southwest of Afton.

== Route description ==
Wyoming Highway 236 acts as a spur from US 89 south of Afton and from there travels west to an intersection with County Route 140 (Bitter Creek Rd.) & County Route 142 (Fairview North Road) in Fairview where the WYO 236 designation ends. The roadway itself continues west as CR 142 to Crow Creek Road (CR 141) as a county-maintained route.

== Major intersections ==
The entire route is in Lincoln County.

Location	mi	km	Destinations	Notes
Fairview	0.0	0.0	CR 140 / CR 142 west	Western Terminus of WYO 236
Afton	2.5	4.0	WYO 241	Northern terminus of WYO 241
Afton	2.6	4.2	US 89	Eastern Terminus of WYO 236
1.000 mi = 1.609 km; 1.000 km = 0.621 mi
