= Interstate 235 =

Interstate 235 is the designation for three Interstate Highways in the United States, all of which are related to Interstate 35:

- Interstate 235 (Iowa), an east–west route through downtown Des Moines.
- Interstate 235 (Kansas), a bypass route of Interstate 135 that travels around the western part of Wichita.
- Interstate 235 (Oklahoma), a 5.4-mile (8.7 km) long north–south route from downtown to north-central Oklahoma City.
