= Interstate 240 =

Interstate 240 may refer to:

- Interstate 240 (North Carolina), a connection into Asheville, North Carolina
- Interstate 240 (Oklahoma), a freeway on the south side of Oklahoma City
- Interstate 240 (Tennessee), a bypass of Memphis, Tennessee
