= Wyoming Highway 231 =

Highway in Wyoming

Wyoming Highway 231
- E. Main Street
- WYO 231 highlighted in red

Route information
- Maintained by WYDOT
- Length: 0.6 mi (970 m)

Major junctions
- West end: CR 207 in Cokeville
- East end: US 30 / WYO 89; WYO 232 in Cokeville

Location
- Country: United States
- State: Wyoming
- Counties: Lincoln

Highway system
- Wyoming State Highway System; Interstate; US; State
← WYO 230	→ WYO 232

Wyoming Highway 231 (WYO 231) is a .6-mile-long (0.97 km) state highway in southeastern Lincoln County, Wyoming that serves as the main street of the town of Cokeville.

== Route description ==
Wyoming Highway 231 is a 1/2 mile long spur of US 30 locally known as E. Main Street. Highway 231's western terminus is at Collette Avenue (CR 207) which provides access to Cokeville Municipal Airport (via CR 207 south). The east end of Highway 231 is at U.S. Route 30/Wyoming Highway 89 and the western terminus of WYO 232.

== Major intersections ==
The entire route is in Cokeville, Lincoln County.

mi	km	Destinations	Notes
0.0	0.0	CR 207	Western Terminus of WYO 231
0.6	0.97	US 30 / WYO 89 WYO 232 east	Eastern Terminus of WYO 231
1.000 mi = 1.609 km; 1.000 km = 0.621 mi
