= Wyoming Highway 239 =

State highway in Freedom, Wyoming, United States

Wyoming Highway 239
- WYO 239 highlighted in red

Route information
- Maintained by WYDOT
- Length: 1.64 mi (2.64 km)

Major junctions
- West end: CR 114 / CR 125 at Wyoming-Idaho State Line in Freedom
- East end: US 89 east edge of Freedom

Location
- Country: United States
- State: Wyoming
- Counties: Lincoln

Highway system
- Wyoming State Highway System; Interstate; US; State
← WYO 238	→ WYO 240

Wyoming Highway 239 (WYO 239) is a 1.64-mile (2.64 km) state highway in the census-designated place (CDP) of Freedom in the Star Valley in Lincoln County, Wyoming, United States, that connects State Line Road (which runs along the Idaho-Wyoming border) with U.S. Route 89 (US 89) on the eastern border of Freedom. (While the unincorporated community of Freedom extends west into Idaho, the CDP is entirely within Wyoming.)

== Route description ==
WYO 239 begins at a T intersection with State Line Road. Northbound State Line Road is also County Road 114 and southbound is also County Road 125 (CR 114 and CR 125) on the Idaho-Wyoming state line. (CR 114 continues north for one mile (1.6 km) along the state line in Freedom to connect with the east end of Idaho State Highway 34, which heads westerly to Soda Springs in Idaho.)

From its western terminus, WYO 239 heads due east for roughly 0.6 miles (0.97 km) before crossing the Salt River. Approximately one more mile (1.6 km) farther east, WYO 239 reaches its eastern terminus at an intersection with US 89 and County Road 116 (CR 116 / Prater Canyon Road) on the eastern edge of the CDP. (US 89 heads north toward Jackson and the Teton National Park and south toward Thayne and Afton. CR 116 continues east toward the town of Star Valley Ranch.)

== Major intersections ==
The entire route is in Freedom, Lincoln County.

mi	km	Destinations	Notes
0.00	0.00	CR 114 north (State Line Rd) – Idaho State Highway 34, Soda Springs (Idaho) CR 125 south (State Line Rd)	Western terminus; Idaho state line; T intersection
		Bridge over the Salt River	
1.64	2.64	US 89 north – Jackson, Teton National Park US 89 south – Thayne, Afton	Eastern terminus
1.64	2.64	CR 116 east (Prater Canyon Rd) – Star Valley Ranch	Continuation east from eastern terminus
1.000 mi = 1.609 km; 1.000 km = 0.621 mi

== See also ==
- List of state highways in Wyoming
