= National Highway 229 (India) =

National highway in India

National Highway 229 is a spur road of National Highway 29 in Nagaland, India. The highway starts from its junction with NH No-29 at Dimapur Sub-Jail, connecting Thahekhü, Chümoukedima and terminates at its junction with NH No-29 in the state of Nagaland. It was declared as NH-229 on July 28, 2016. The highway is 19 km long.
