= Utah State Route 239 =

Utah State Route 239 may refer to:

- Utah State Route 239 (1947-1969)
- Utah State Route 239 (1981-2007)
