= Interstate 229 =

Interstate 229 (I-229) is the designation for two Interstate Highways in the United States, both related to Interstate 29:

- Interstate 229 (South Dakota), a bypass of Sioux Falls, South Dakota
- Interstate 229 (Missouri), a loop around St. Joseph, Missouri
