= A231 highway (Nigeria) =

Road in Nigeria

Coordinates: 5.01032°N 6.872463°E

Trunk Road A231

Location
- Country: Nigeria

Highway system
- Transport in Nigeria

The A231 highway is a highway in Nigeria. It is one of the east-west roads linking the main south-north roads. (It is named from the two highways it links).

It runs from the A2 highway at Elele, in Rivers State, to the southern end of the A3 highway at Port Harcourt.
