= Woodruff, Utah =

- Town
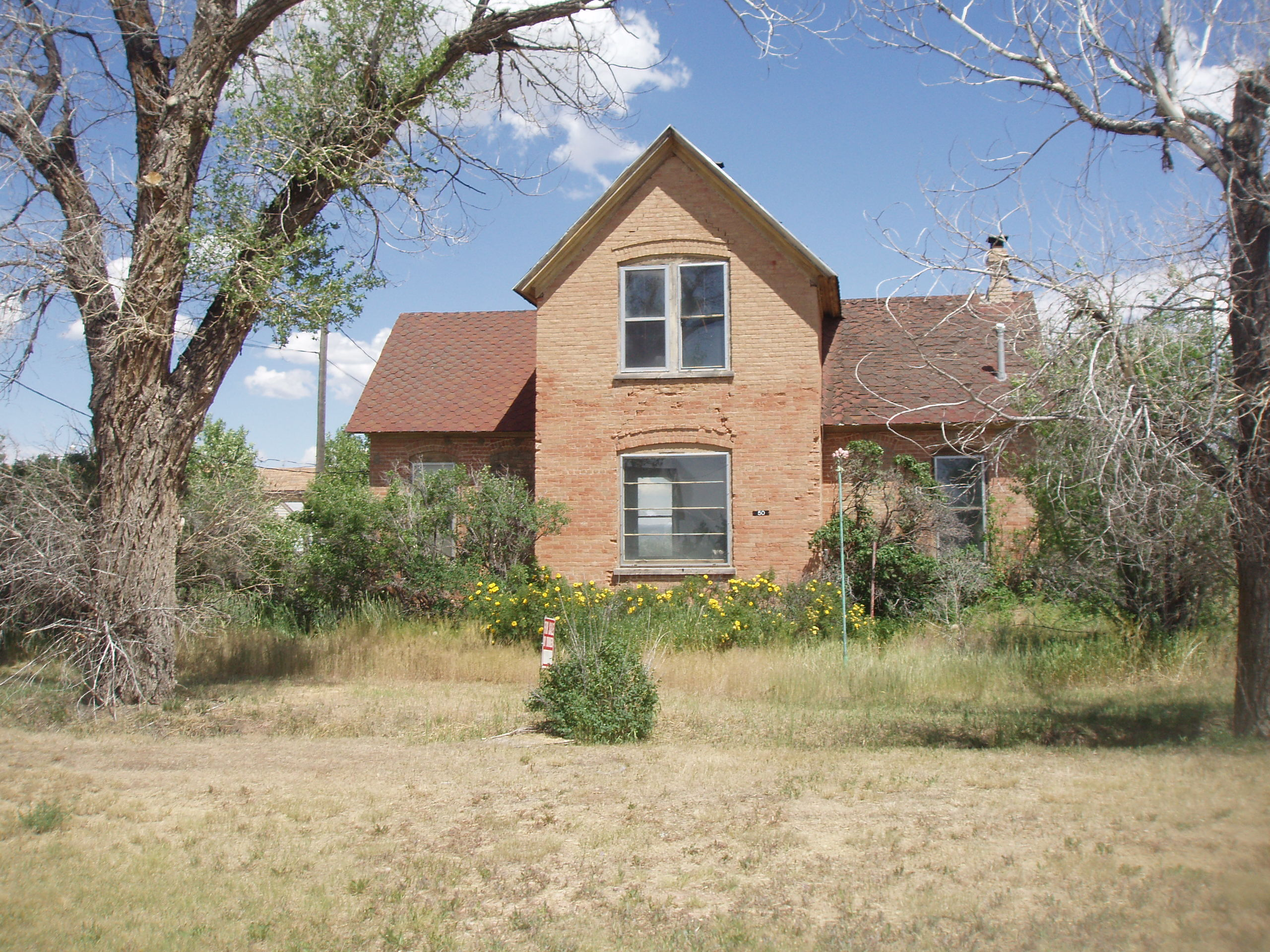
- The Woodruff Stake House, a former Latter-day Saint office building, is listed on the National Register of Historic Places.

- Location in Rich County and the state of Utah

- Location of Utah in the United States
- Coordinates: 41°31′16″N 111°09′50″W
- Country: United States
- State: Utah
- County: Rich
- Settled: 1865
- Incorporated: 1933
- Named for: Wilford Woodruff

Area
  - Total: 0.72 sq mi (1.87 km^{2})
  - Land: 0.72 sq mi (1.87 km^{2})
  - Water: 0 sq mi (0.00 km^{2})
- Elevation: 6,342 ft (1,933 m)

Population (2020)
  - Total: 169
  - Estimate (2019): 212
  - Density: 293.6/sq mi (113.37/km^{2})
- Time zone: UTC-7 (Mountain (MST))
  - Summer (DST): UTC-6 (MDT)
- ZIP code: 84086
- Area code: 435
- FIPS code: 49-85260
- GNIS feature ID: 2413507
- Website: woodruff.utah.gov

Woodruff is a town in Rich County, Utah, United States. The population was 169 at the 2020 census.

== History ==
The first settlement at Woodruff was made in 1870. A post office called Woodruff has been in operation since 1872. The town was named in honor of Wilford Woodruff, fourth President of The Church of Jesus Christ of Latter-day Saints.

== Geography ==
According to the United States Census Bureau, the town has a total area of 0.5 square mile (1.4 km^{2}), all land.

=== Climate ===
This climatic region is typified by large seasonal temperature differences, with warm to summers and cold (sometimes severely cold) winters. According to the Köppen Climate Classification system, Woodruff has a humid continental climate, abbreviated "Dfb" on climate maps. Woodruff's climate has high diurnal temperature variation, resulting in cold nights even during summer.

Climate data for Woodruff, Utah, 1991–2020 normals, extremes 1897–present
Month	Jan	Feb	Mar	Apr	May	Jun	Jul	Aug	Sep	Oct	Nov	Dec	Year
Record high °F (°C)	62 (17)	65 (18)	71 (22)	81 (27)	89 (32)	100 (38)	98 (37)	98 (37)	95 (35)	93 (34)	75 (24)	64 (18)	100 (38)
Mean maximum °F (°C)	43.6 (6.4)	47.4 (8.6)	60.8 (16.0)	72.4 (22.4)	79.6 (26.4)	86.4 (30.2)	90.9 (32.7)	89.5 (31.9)	84.9 (29.4)	75.2 (24.0)	61.3 (16.3)	46.9 (8.3)	91.9 (33.3)
Mean daily maximum °F (°C)	28.6 (−1.9)	32.0 (0.0)	44.4 (6.9)	55.2 (12.9)	65.0 (18.3)	74.6 (23.7)	83.4 (28.6)	82.0 (27.8)	73.0 (22.8)	59.2 (15.1)	43.4 (6.3)	29.8 (−1.2)	55.9 (13.3)
Daily mean °F (°C)	15.3 (−9.3)	18.4 (−7.6)	30.2 (−1.0)	39.1 (3.9)	47.9 (8.8)	56.0 (13.3)	63.2 (17.3)	61.5 (16.4)	52.6 (11.4)	40.9 (4.9)	28.3 (−2.1)	16.7 (−8.5)	39.2 (4.0)
Mean daily minimum °F (°C)	2.0 (−16.7)	4.9 (−15.1)	16.0 (−8.9)	23.0 (−5.0)	30.9 (−0.6)	37.4 (3.0)	43.0 (6.1)	40.9 (4.9)	32.1 (0.1)	22.7 (−5.2)	13.3 (−10.4)	3.6 (−15.8)	22.5 (−5.3)
Mean minimum °F (°C)	−20.7 (−29.3)	−19.4 (−28.6)	−4.2 (−20.1)	11.0 (−11.7)	18.9 (−7.3)	28.7 (−1.8)	35.8 (2.1)	31.2 (−0.4)	20.0 (−6.7)	8.5 (−13.1)	−7.6 (−22.0)	−19.3 (−28.5)	−27.4 (−33.0)
Record low °F (°C)	−47 (−44)	−46 (−43)	−32 (−36)	−17 (−27)	6 (−14)	15 (−9)	21 (−6)	20 (−7)	2 (−17)	−17 (−27)	−30 (−34)	−49 (−45)	−49 (−45)
Average precipitation inches (mm)	0.55 (14)	0.53 (13)	0.63 (16)	0.86 (22)	1.42 (36)	1.04 (26)	0.60 (15)	0.90 (23)	1.10 (28)	1.08 (27)	0.66 (17)	0.50 (13)	9.87 (251)
Average snowfall inches (cm)	10.3 (26)	9.1 (23)	7.0 (18)	4.3 (11)	1.0 (2.5)	0.1 (0.25)	0.0 (0.0)	0.0 (0.0)	0.6 (1.5)	2.9 (7.4)	5.9 (15)	9.2 (23)	50.4 (128)
Average precipitation days (≥ 0.01 in)	4.7	5.2	4.9	5.5	8.2	4.2	4.0	5.4	5.2	5.3	4.5	4.9	62.0
Average snowy days (≥ 0.1 in)	4.0	4.2	3.2	1.8	0.6	0.1	0.0	0.0	0.1	1.1	2.8	4.1	22.0
Source: NOAA

== Demographics ==
Historical population
Census	Pop.	Note	%±
1880	268		—
1890	340		26.9%
1900	487		43.2%
1910	367		−24.6%
1920	366		−0.3%
1930	404		10.4%
1940	241		−40.3%
1950	175		−27.4%
1960	169		−3.4%
1970	173		2.4%
1980	222		28.3%
1990	135		−39.2%
2000	194		43.7%
2010	180		−7.2%
2020	169		−6.1%
U.S. Decennial Census

As of the census of 2000, there were 194 people, 60 households, and 49 families residing in the town. The population density was 361.4 people per square mile (138.7/km^{2}). There were 75 housing units at an average density of 139.7 per square mile (53.6/km^{2}). The racial makeup of the town was 100.00% White.

There were 60 households, out of which 51.7% had children under the age of 18 living with them, 70.0% were married couples living together, 8.3% had a female householder with no husband present, and 16.7% were non-families. 13.3% of all households were made up of individuals, and 1.7% had someone living alone who was 65 years of age or older. The average household size was 3.23, and the average family size was 3.62.

In the town, the population was spread out, with 42.8% under the age of 18, 5.2% from 18 to 24, 24.2% from 25 to 44, 15.5% from 45 to 64, and 12.4% who were 65 years of age or older. The median age was 26 years. For every 100 females, there were 104.2 males. For every 100 females aged 18 and over, there were 109.4 males.

The median income for a household in the town was $43,000, and the median income for a family was $42,750. Males had a median income of $38,333 versus $16,875 for females. The per capita income for the town was $13,976. About 10.5% of families and 18.7% of the population were below the poverty line, including 25.0% of those under the age of eighteen and 11.4% of those 65 or over.

== Notable person ==
- Merlo J. Pusey, journalist and Pulitzer Prize-winning biographer

== See also ==
- List of cities and towns in Utah
