= Cokeville, Wyoming =

- Town
- Motto: "Welcome to the Open Range!"
- Location of Cokeville in Lincoln County, Wyoming.
- Coordinates: 42°04′56″N 110°57′02″W
- Country: United States
- State: Wyoming
- County: Lincoln

Government
  - Type: Council–Manager

Area
  - Total: 1.31 sq mi (3.38 km^{2})
  - Land: 1.31 sq mi (3.38 km^{2})
  - Water: 0 sq mi (0.00 km^{2})
- Elevation: 6,194 ft (1,888 m)

Population (2020)
  - Total: 502
  - Density: 424.6/sq mi (163.95/km^{2})
- Time zone: UTC-7 (Mountain (MST))
  - Summer (DST): UTC-6 (MDT)
- ZIP code: 83114
- Area code: 307
- FIPS code: 56-15905
- GNIS feature ID: 2413222

Cokeville is a town in Lincoln County, Wyoming, United States. The population was 502 at the 2020 census. The town is known for the Cokeville Elementary School hostage crisis.

Cokeville was incorporated in 1910.

== History ==
The Shoshone Indians were the first inhabitants of the area. The first Euro-American settler, Tilford Kutch, arrived in 1869. In 1873, he opened a trading post and ran a ferry across Smiths Fork. After the arrival of the railroad in 1882, the town grew, and was incorporated in 1910.

The town was named for the coal found in the area. Following the railroad, sheep ranching became more popular, reaching its peak in 1918, when Cokeville was informally called the "Sheep Capital of the World".

On May 16, 1986, former town marshal David Young and his wife Doris Young took 167 children and adults hostage during the Cokeville Elementary School hostage crisis. The captives escaped after an improvised gasoline bomb exploded and both hostage takers died in a murder-suicide. 79 hostages were injured, many with serious burns.

== Geography ==
According to the United States Census Bureau, the town has a total area of 1.18 square miles (3.06 km^{2}), all land.

== Demographics ==
Historical population
Census	Pop.	Note	%±
1880	62		—
1920	430		—
1930	431		0.2%
1940	452		4.9%
1950	440		−2.7%
1960	545		23.9%
1970	440		−19.3%
1980	515		17.0%
1990	493		−4.3%
2000	506		2.6%
2010	535		5.7%
2020	502		−6.2%
U.S. Decennial Census

=== 2010 census ===
As of the census of 2010, there were 535 people, 166 households, and 127 families residing in the town. The population density was 453.4 inhabitants per square mile (175.1/km^{2}). There were 200 housing units at an average density of 169.5 per square mile (65.4/km^{2}). The racial makeup of the town was 98.7% White, 0.4% Native American, 0.6% from other races, and 0.4% from two or more races. Hispanic or Latino of any race were 1.5% of the population.

There were 166 households, of which 45.8% had children under the age of 18 living with them, 69.3% were married couples living together, 6.0% had a female householder with no husband present, 1.2% had a male householder with no wife present, and 23.5% were non-families. 21.7% of all households were made up of individuals, and 9.6% had someone living alone who was 65 years of age or older. The average household size was 3.22 and the average family size was 3.87.

The median age in the town was 29.6 years. 41.5% of residents were under the age of 18; 4.7% were between the ages of 18 and 24; 21.1% were from 25 to 44; 21.7% were from 45 to 64; and 11% were 65 years of age or older. The gender makeup of the town was 51.4% male and 48.6% female.

== Economy ==
A solar farm was planned south of Cokeville. In 2024 construction plans were halted, but a clear reason was not given.

== Government ==
As of 2024, Colby Peck is the mayor of Cokeville. The mayor is a non-partisan position.

== Education ==
Public education in the town of Cokeville is provided by Lincoln County School District #2. Zoned campuses include Cokeville Elementary School (grades K-6) and Cokeville High School (grades 7–12).

Cokeville has a public library, a branch of the Lincoln County Library System.

== Infrastructure ==
=== Transportation by air ===
Cokeville Municipal Airport (U06) is an operational municipal airport serving the Town of Cokeville and surrounding areas. It is 3 nautical miles (6 km) south of Cokeville. The airport is located on CR 207, and can be accessible by WYO 231, and from east of Laketown, Utah, by Manhead Road. The airport is 6,270 feet (1,911 m) above sea level, with an area of 320 acres (1.3 km^{2}). It is owned by the town hall of Cokeville.

=== Transportation by road ===
- WYO 231 is a spur of US 30, and is the "main street" of Cokeville.
- US 30 is the only thoroughfare of the town, and provides access to Interstate 80 and nearby Idaho.
- WYO 232 branches to the east of US 30 and serves a rural area northeast of Cokeville.

== Notable person ==
- Minerva Teichert (1888–1976), Western and LDS artist

== See also ==
- List of municipalities in Wyoming
