= Montpelier, Idaho =

- City
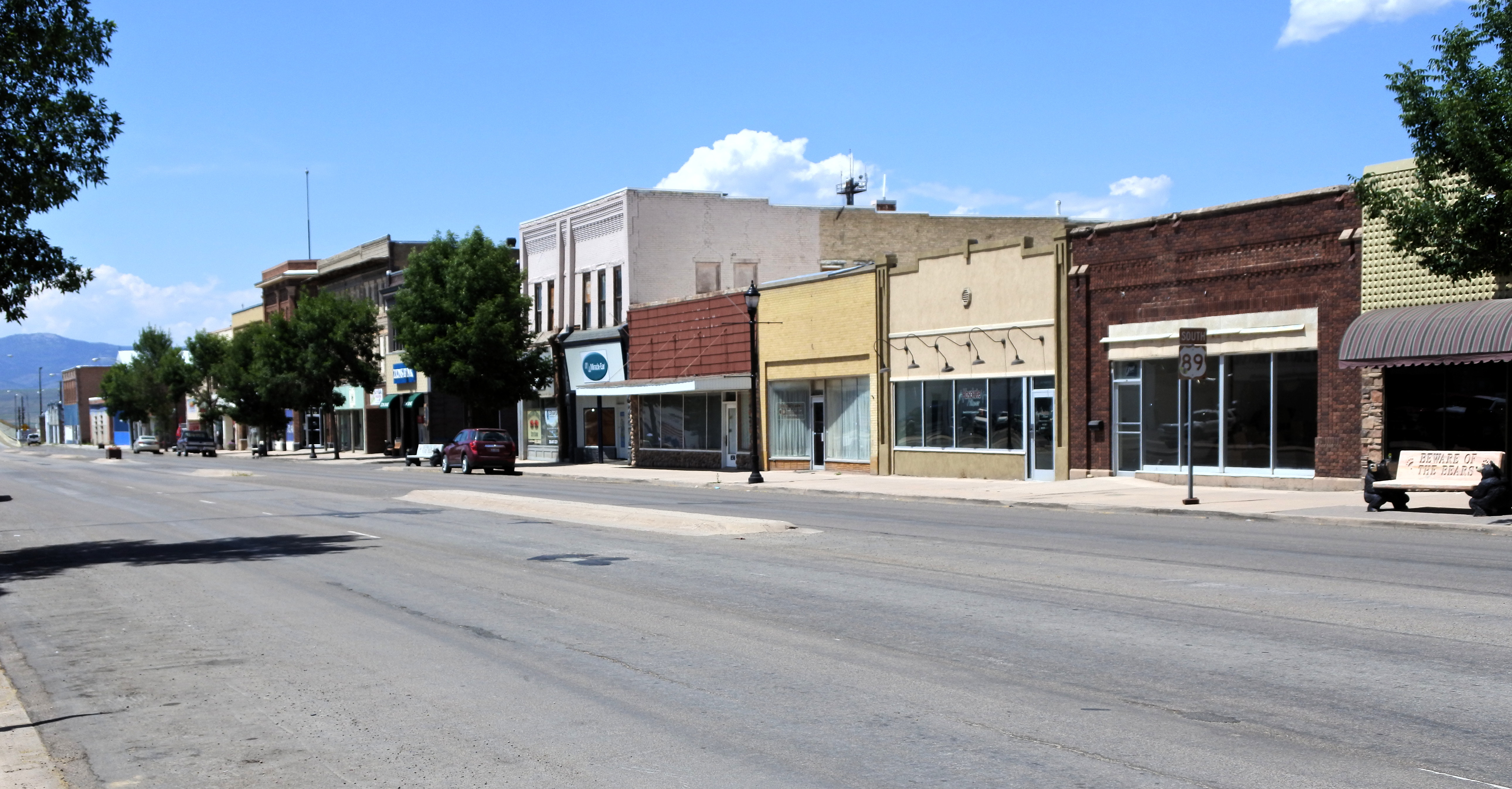
- Montpelier, Idaho, downtown view.

- Location of Montpelier in Bear Lake County, Idaho.
- Coordinates: 42°19′34″N 111°17′56″W
- Country: United States
- State: Idaho
- County: Bear Lake
- Named for: Montpelier, Vermont

Government
  - Type: Mayor–council
  - Mayor: Ted Slivinski

Area
  - Total: 2.32 sq mi (6.00 km^{2})
  - Land: 2.32 sq mi (6.00 km^{2})
  - Water: 0 sq mi (0.00 km^{2})
- Elevation: 5,978 ft (1,822 m)

Population (2020)
  - Total: 2,643
  - Density: 1,095/sq mi (422.7/km^{2})
- Time zone: UTC-7 (Mountain (MST))
  - Summer (DST): UTC-6 (MDT)
- ZIP codes: 83220, 83254
- Area codes: 208, 986
- FIPS code: 16-53920
- GNIS feature ID: 2411150
- Website: montpelier.id.gov

Montpelier is a city in Bear Lake County, Idaho, United States. The population was 2,643 at the 2020 census. The city is the largest community in the Bear Lake Valley, a farming region north of Bear Lake in southeastern Idaho along the Utah border. It was settled in 1863 by Mormon pioneers on the route of the Oregon Trail. Nearby to the east is the border with Wyoming.

== History ==
As happened for many western towns, the name has been changed numerous times. First it was known as Clover Creek by Oregon Trail travelers, later it became Belmont and finally was given the name Montpelier by Brigham Young, one of the early leaders of the Church of Jesus Christ of Latter-day Saints (LDS Church), after the capital of his birth state of Vermont. The city was first settled in 1864.

The Oregon Short Line Railway started in Granger, Wyoming from the existing Union Pacific station, and reached Montpelier on August 5, 1882 (the rail line reached Huntington, Oregon in 1884). The terminal was located here until 1972. The railroad brought a population that made Montpelier the county's "Gentile Town" as opposed to nearby Mormon-run Paris that was the county seat. Both cities would have tabernacles built in their city limits.

U.S. Routes 89 and 30 intersect in Montpelier.

On August 13, 1896, the Bank of Montpelier was the site of a heist by Butch Cassidy and members of Butch Cassidy's Wild Bunch, Elzy Lay and Henry "Bub" Meeks, who were supposedly trying to get enough money to bail out fellow gang member Matt Warner. They escaped with roughly $7,000. This historical footnote has become a notable component of the town's identity and is commemorated by a plaque on Washington Street (Highway 89).

On 3 April 2022, LDS Prophet Russell M. Nelson announced that an LDS Temple would be built in Montpelier. A groundbreaking ceremony for the temple was held on June 17, 2023.

== Arts and culture ==
The National Oregon/California Trail Center in Montpelier is an interactive interpretive center dedicated to the history of the trails that ran through the town.

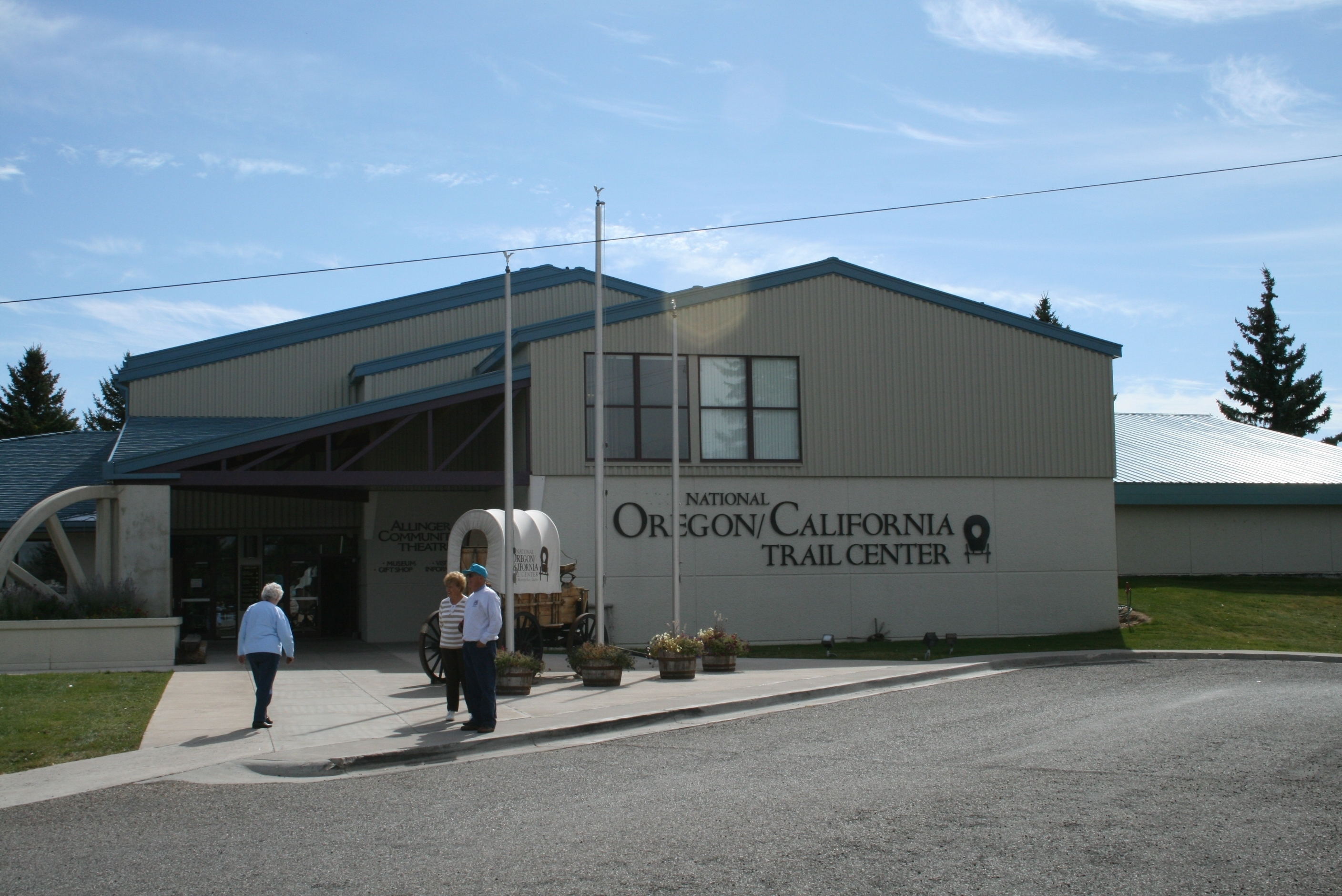
The National Oregon/California Trail Center, 320 North 4th Street, Montpelier, ID

The Butch Cassidy Museum at the Bank of Montpelier is located in a bank built in 1891 which contains the original vault. It is the only bank robbed by Butch Cassidy that continues to stand.

The 4.9 acres (2.0 ha) Montpelier Historic District is listed on the National Register of Historic Places. It includes four buildings: the city hall, a high school, the high school's gymnasium, and the Church of Jesus Christ of Latter-Day Saints' Stake Tabernacle. Also listed in the register are the John A. Bagley House and Montpelier Odd Fellows Hall.

== Geography ==
According to the United States Census Bureau, the city has a total area of 2.33 square miles (6.03 km^{2}), all of it land.

=== Climate ===
According to the Köppen climate classification, Montpelier has a warm-summer humid continental climate (Köppen climate classification: Dfb).

Climate data for Montpelier, Idaho, 1991–2020 simulated normals (5951 ft elevation)
Month	Jan	Feb	Mar	Apr	May	Jun	Jul	Aug	Sep	Oct	Nov	Dec	Year
Mean daily maximum °F (°C)	29.7 (−1.3)	32.5 (0.3)	42.1 (5.6)	52.5 (11.4)	62.8 (17.1)	73.2 (22.9)	83.5 (28.6)	82.6 (28.1)	72.5 (22.5)	58.1 (14.5)	42.4 (5.8)	30.9 (−0.6)	55.2 (12.9)
Daily mean °F (°C)	18.5 (−7.5)	20.5 (−6.4)	30.2 (−1.0)	39.7 (4.3)	48.9 (9.4)	57.4 (14.1)	65.5 (18.6)	64.2 (17.9)	54.7 (12.6)	43.0 (6.1)	30.6 (−0.8)	20.1 (−6.6)	41.1 (5.1)
Mean daily minimum °F (°C)	7.3 (−13.7)	8.4 (−13.1)	18.3 (−7.6)	27.0 (−2.8)	35.1 (1.7)	41.5 (5.3)	47.3 (8.5)	45.9 (7.7)	36.9 (2.7)	27.7 (−2.4)	18.9 (−7.3)	9.5 (−12.5)	27.0 (−2.8)
Average precipitation inches (mm)	1.56 (39.55)	1.51 (38.37)	1.37 (34.75)	1.55 (39.26)	1.95 (49.52)	1.20 (30.60)	0.66 (16.82)	0.76 (19.20)	1.23 (31.27)	1.27 (32.37)	1.20 (30.59)	1.38 (35.01)	15.64 (397.31)
Average dew point °F (°C)	11.5 (−11.4)	13.1 (−10.5)	19.9 (−6.7)	25.2 (−3.8)	32.4 (0.2)	37.4 (3.0)	40.8 (4.9)	38.8 (3.8)	32.2 (0.1)	25.7 (−3.5)	19.2 (−7.1)	13.1 (−10.5)	25.8 (−3.5)
Source: Prism Climate Group

== Demographics ==
Historical population
Census	Pop.	Note	%±
1870	120		—
1880	546		355.0%
1890	1,174		115.0%
1900	1,444		23.0%
1910	1,924		33.2%
1920	2,984		55.1%
1930	2,436		−18.4%
1940	2,824		15.9%
1950	2,682		−5.0%
1960	3,146		17.3%
1970	2,604		−17.2%
1980	3,107		19.3%
1990	2,656		−14.5%
2000	2,785		4.9%
2010	2,597		−6.8%
2020	2,643		1.8%
U.S. Decennial Census

=== 2020 census ===
As of the 2020 census, Montpelier had a population of 2,643. The median age was 38.9 years. 27.6% of residents were under the age of 18 and 19.6% of residents were 65 years of age or older. For every 100 females there were 94.3 males, and for every 100 females age 18 and over there were 91.8 males age 18 and over.

0.0% of residents lived in urban areas, while 100.0% lived in rural areas.

There were 1,053 households in Montpelier, of which 32.2% had children under the age of 18 living in them. Of all households, 50.4% were married-couple households, 20.2% were households with a male householder and no spouse or partner present, and 24.0% were households with a female householder and no spouse or partner present. About 30.8% of all households were made up of individuals and 14.7% had someone living alone who was 65 years of age or older.

There were 1,204 housing units, of which 12.5% were vacant. The homeowner vacancy rate was 2.3% and the rental vacancy rate was 9.8%.

Racial composition as of the 2020 census
Race	Number	Percent
White	2,488	94.1%
Black or African American	0	0.0%
American Indian and Alaska Native	16	0.6%
Asian	2	0.1%
Native Hawaiian and Other Pacific Islander	1	0.0%
Some other race	25	0.9%
Two or more races	111	4.2%
Hispanic or Latino (of any race)	121	4.6%

=== 2010 census ===
As of the census of 2010, there were 2,597 people, 1,006 households, and 680 families living in the city. The population density was 1,114.6 inhabitants per square mile (430.3/km^{2}). There were 1,234 housing units at an average density of 529.6 per square mile (204.5/km^{2}). The racial makeup of the city was 96.2% White, 0.4% Native American, 0.2% Asian, 2.0% from other races, and 1.2% from two or more races. Hispanic or Latino of any race were 4.9% of the population.

There were 1,006 households, of which 35.0% had children under the age of 18 living with them, 55.6% were married couples living together, 8.1% had a female householder with no husband present, 4.0% had a male householder with no wife present, and 32.4% were non-families. 28.5% of all households were made up of individuals, and 13.1% had someone living alone who was 65 years of age or older. The average household size was 2.55 and the average family size was 3.17.

The median age in the city was 36.4 years. 29.1% of residents were under the age of 18; 6.5% were between the ages of 18 and 24; 23.4% were from 25 to 44; 23.9% were from 45 to 64; and 17.1% were 65 years of age or older. The gender makeup of the city was 48.2% male and 51.8% female.

=== 2000 census ===
As of the census of 2000, there were 2,785 people, 1,012 households, and 715 families living in the city. The population density was 1,512.3 inhabitants per square mile (583.9/km^{2}). There were 1,171 housing units at an average density of 635.9 per square mile (245.5/km^{2}). The racial makeup of the city was 96.70% White, 0.61% Native American, 0.04% Pacific Islander, 1.97% from other races, and 0.68% from two or more races. Hispanic or Latino of any race were 3.81% of the population.

There were 1,012 households, out of which 38.4% had children under the age of 18 living with them, 58.7% were married couples living together, 8.8% had a female householder with no husband present, and 29.3% were non-families. 26.6% of all households were made up of individuals, and 13.9% had someone living alone who was 65 years of age or older. The average household size was 2.70 and the average family size was 3.31.

In the city, the population was spread out, with 32.3% under the age of 18, 8.3% from 18 to 24, 23.6% from 25 to 44, 19.4% from 45 to 64, and 16.6% who were 65 years of age or older. The median age was 34 years. For every 100 females, there were 96.3 males. For every 100 females age 18 and over, there were 93.4 males.

The median income for a household in the city was $29,693, and the median income for a family was $33,639. Males had a median income of $32,218 versus $15,227 for females. The per capita income for the city was $12,364. About 9.2% of families and 12.9% of the population were below the poverty line, including 17.6% of those under age 18 and 9.2% of those age 65 or over.

== Education ==
Montpelier is home to Bear Lake High School.

== Notable people ==
- Thomas L. Glenn (1847–1918), U.S. representative from Idaho and mayor of Montpelier
