= Salt River (Wyoming) =

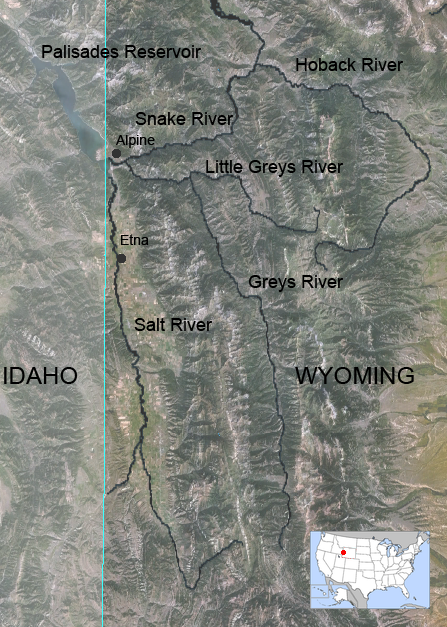
- Map of Salt, Greys and Hoback River showing the Salt

Location
- Country: United States
- State: Wyoming

Physical characteristics
- Source
  - location: Mount Wagner, Salt River Range, Wyoming
  - coordinates: 42°35′38″N 110°48′08″W
- Mouth: Palisades Reservoir
  - location: Alpine, Wyoming
  - coordinates: 43°10′02″N 111°03′52″W
- Length: 84 mi (135 km)
- Basin size: 890 mi^{2} (2,300 km^{2})
- Discharge
  - location: Etna, Wyoming
  - average: 773 cuft/s
  - minimum: 345 cuft/s
  - maximum: 2,476 cuft/s

The Salt River is an 84-mile-long (135 km) river draining a valley in Lincoln County in western Wyoming. It is named for several exposed beds of salt and briny salt springs of up 60% pure salt in Idaho that drains into the Salt River via Stump Creek. The Salt River valley was a popular destination for Indians and later pioneers seeking salt and game. The headwaters of the river are below 10,472-foot (3,192 m) Mount Wagner in the Salt River Range. The river flows west out of the mountains and then northward along the border of Wyoming and Idaho. It passes 6,600-foot (2,000 m) Smoot, Wyoming and then meanders through the mostly agricultural Star Valley, being joined by numerous creeks along the way, to its confluence with the Snake River near the town of Alpine (elevation 5,600 feet (1,700 m)).

The Salt River watershed drains about 890 square miles (2,300 km^{2}) of the western part of the Salt River Range in Wyoming and the eastern part of the Caribou Range of Idaho. The Greys River, draining part of the eastern side of the Salt River Range, joins the Snake River just a few miles east of the mouth of the Salt River.

About halfway along its course, the Salt River passes through a section known as the "Narrows", where it cuts between two ridges that divide Star Valley into an upper and lower valleys. The river's mouth is now inundated by the reservoir of the Palisades Dam in Idaho during high water. Paralleling the Salt River is Wyoming Highway 89 leading north to Teton and Yellowstone National Park.

The river is an excellent source for fly fishing for brook, rainbow, cutthroat and brown trout. The state ranks the Salt River Class 2 (red) – Very good trout waters – fisheries of statewide importance.

== History ==
Prior to about 1890, during the summer the Salt River valley was often visited by several different Indian tribes who valued its bountiful game, fish and salt. Starting from about 1810 to 1840 it and its many tributaries was trapped in the spring and fall by numerous trappers seeking its often plentiful beaver, muskrats and other fur and game. From about 1858 to 1910 the Lander Road of the Oregon and California Trail paralleled much of the river from above Smoot to Auburn, Wyoming. Starting in 1866 to about 1880 an extensive salt works called the Oneida Salt Works dried the salt from some of these salt springs and sold it to miners, ranchers etc. in Wyoming, Idaho and Montana. They closed down operations in the winter. Before about 1879 when settlers first started wintering over in the high upland valley later called Star Valley people left for warmer places to spend the winter.

Some of the river's tributaries include Cottonwood, Stump, Willow, Strawberry, Cedar, Jackknife, and Dry creeks. Towns near the river progressing north include Smoot, Fairview, Afton, Grover, Auburn, Turnerville, Bedford, Thayne, Star Valley Ranch, Freedom, Etna, and Alpine.

== See also ==
- Hoback River
- Greys River
- List of rivers of Wyoming
- List of longest streams of Idaho
