= List of census-designated places in Wyoming =

This article lists census-designated places (CDPs) in the U.S. state of Wyoming. At the 2020 census, there were a total of 106 census-designated places in Wyoming.

== Census-designated places ==
CDP	Population	County
Albany	31	Albany
Alcova	34	Natrona
Alpine Northeast	246	Lincoln
Alpine Northwest	305	Lincoln
Alta	429	Teton
Antelope Hills	95	Natrona
Arapahoe	1,612	Fremont
Arlington	37	Carbon
Arrowhead Springs	59	Sweetwater
Arvada	33	Sheridan
Atlantic City	54	Fremont
Auburn	374	Lincoln
Bedford	465	Lincoln
Bessemer Bend	202	Natrona
Beulah	84	Crook
Big Horn	457	Sheridan
Bondurant	108	Sublette
Boulder	115	Sublette
Boulder Flats	450	Fremont
Brookhurst	205	Natrona
Carpenter	93	Laramie
Carter	0	Uinta
Casper Mountain	545	Natrona
Centennial	283	Albany
Chugcreek	154	Platte
Clearview Acres	758	Sweetwater
Cora	114	Sublette
Crowheart	120	Fremont
Daniel	108	Sublette
Eden	235	Sweetwater
El Rancho	18	Platte
Esterbrook	40	Converse
Ethete	1,393	Fremont
Etna	185	Lincoln
Fairview	277	Lincoln
Farson	272	Sweetwater
Fontenelle	5	Lincoln
Fort Bridger	354	Uinta
Fort Washakie	1,650	Fremont
Fox Farm-College	3,876	Laramie
Fox Park	12	Albany
Freedom	247	Lincoln
Garland	110	Park
Grover	481	Lincoln
Hartrandt	724	Natrona
Hawk Springs	47	Goshen
Hillsdale	40	Laramie
Hill View Heights	144	Weston
Hoback	1,276	Teton
Homa Hills	224	Natrona
Huntley	11	Goshen
Hyattville	79	Big Horn
James Town	455	Sweetwater
Jeffrey City	47	Fremont
Johnstown	227	Fremont
Kelly	127	Teton
Lakeview North	97	Platte
Lance Creek	43	Niobrara
Little America	47	Sweetwater
Lonetree	57	Uinta
Lucerne	548	Hot Springs
McKinnon	20	Sweetwater
Mammoth	262	Park
Meadow Acres	201	Natrona
Moose Wilson Road	1,661	Teton
Mountain View	67	Natrona
Nordic	628	Lincoln
North Rock Springs	2,439	Sweetwater
Oakley	25	Lincoln
Orin	52	Converse
Osage	151	Weston
Osmond	405	Lincoln
Owl Creek	4	Hot Springs
Parkman	180	Sheridan
Point of Rocks	53	Sweetwater
Powder Horn	682	Sheridan
Powder River	30	Natrona
Purple Sage	319	Sweetwater
Rafter J Ranch	1,179	Teton
Ralston	240	Park
Ranchettes	6,199	Laramie
Red Butte	410	Natrona
Reliance	622	Sweetwater
Robertson	95	Uinta
Ryan Park	33	Carbon
Shell	74	Big Horn
Slater	78	Platte
Sleepy Hollow	1,227	Campbell
Smoot	376	Lincoln
South Greeley	4,733	Laramie
South Park	1,908	Teton
Story	903	Sheridan
Table Rock	0	Sweetwater
Taylor	104	Lincoln
Teton Village	517	Teton
Turnerville	222	Lincoln
Urie	206	Uinta
Veteran	21	Goshen
Vista West	940	Natrona
Warren AFB	2,863	Laramie
Washam	39	Sweetwater
Westview Circle	41	Platte
Whiting	94	Platte
Wilson	1,567	Teton
Woods Landing-Jelm	118	Albany
Y-O Ranch	172	Platte

== See also ==
- List of municipalities in Wyoming
- Index of Wyoming-related articles
- Outline of Wyoming
