= Star Valley (Wyoming) =

Valley in Wyoming and Idaho, US

Coordinates: 42°02′30″N 116°56′50″W

The Star Valley (formerly known as Salt River Valley), is a valley located primarily in Lincoln County, Wyoming, United States, that extends slightly west into Bonneville and Caribou counties in Idaho. The Salt River runs north through the length of the valley. Despite being a landform, and not being a populated place, "Star Valley" is often used by locals as if it were the name of an actual community.

== Geography ==
The altitude of the valley ranges from 5,600–7,000 feet (1,700–2,100 m). The valley itself is 56 miles (90 km) long and between 5 and 15 miles (8.0 and 24.1 km) wide in different areas.

Three major rivers in Wyoming – the Salt River, the Greys River, and the Snake River – converge near Alpine (also called "Alpine Junction") at the Palisades Reservoir. The Salt River meanders through the length of Star Valley and runs North, in some places parallel to Wyoming Highway 89. About halfway through the valley, the Salt River passes through a two-ridge divide, called "the Narrows," that splits it into two main portions – the "Upper Valley" (south) and the "Lower Valley" (north). Communities in the "Lower Valley" include Alpine, Bedford, Etna, Freedom, Nordic, Star Valley Ranch, Thayne, and Turnerville. Those in the "Upper Valley" include Afton, Auburn, Fairview, Grover, Osmond, and Smoot.

== History ==
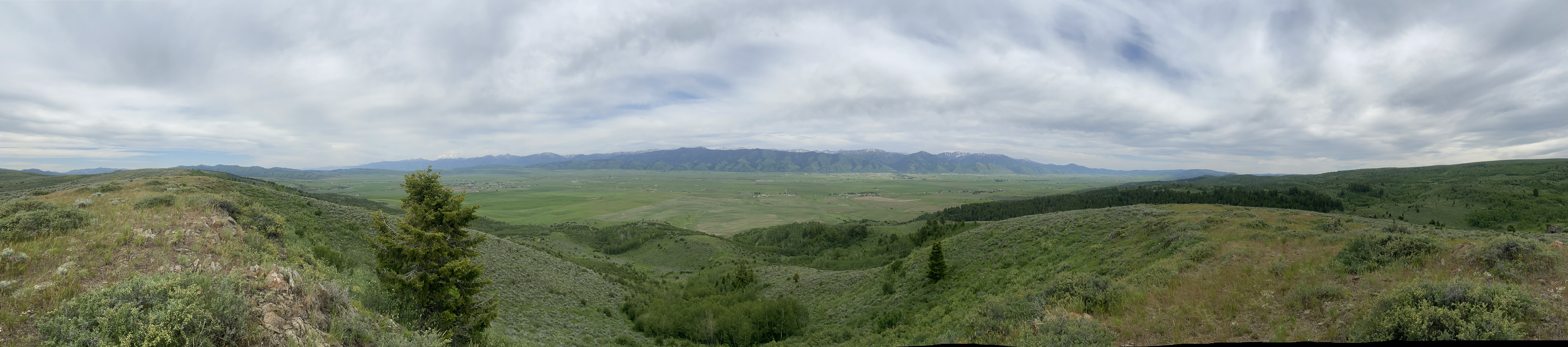
Star Valley looking east, June 2020

There are multiple theories as to where the name "Star Valley" came from. One theory is the name came from a general authority of the Church of Jesus Christ of Latter-Day Saints (LDS Church) proclaiming it "the Star of All Valleys" for its natural beauty, and this name was later shortened to "Star Valley." Another, less supported, theory suggests that the name came from the word "starvation," (or "to starve") – a name that the area gained during the bitter winters of the 1880s.

Star Valley was originally inhabited by peoples from many tribes and nations. Some of those may include the Shoshone Tribe, the Northern Arapaho Tribe, and the Bannock Tribe. They were drawn to the valley for its abundant game and pure salt deposits found in the "Upper Valley" both near the present town of Auburn and to the south of present-day Afton. There is evidence to suggest that native peoples also visited the valley, because of spiritual reverence for the mountains themselves. Evidence of this is supported by a man-made structure called "The Enclosure" by Nathaniel P. Langford. It's a circular or elliptical arrangement of flat rocks 7 by 9 feet across and 3 feet high.

American explorers are known to have traveled through the area as early as 1812, seeking new routes to the West Coast. Canadian and American trappers followed, frequenting the area through the 1840s. The 1850s and 1860s saw many emigrants passing through the upper Star Valley area via the Lander Road on the Oregon Trail. White settlement of the area did not begin in earnest, though, until the late 1870s when LDS Apostles Moses Thatcher and Brigham Young, Jr. chose the valley for colonization. Star Valley was settled in the late 1870s by William Heap and Social Rolf -- Mormon pioneers. Archibald Gardner and members of his extended family arrived in 1889, ten years after Heap and Rolf, building and operating five mills of various types in the valley.

=== Agriculture and industry ===
At one time in its history, Star Valley was also known as "Little Switzerland," because of the number of dairies that were opened as settlers moved into the area. Velma Linford wrote in "Wyoming Frontier State," that in 1947 the whole of Star Valley had 600 dairies milking about 8,000 cows. By 1982, there were about 175 dairy farms milking about 5,393 cows. The Thayne Creamery closed in 2005, which completely ended an era for the valley.

A well-known resident of the valley was Ernest Brog.

=== Literature ===
In the early 20th century, Adelbert Wilde, Maud Burton, and Josephine Burton wrote the "Historical Pageant" to inform citizens of Afton about the history of the settlement of Star Valley. Included in the twenty-page pageant were the founders of the valley – Moses Thatcher and Charles D. Cazier – as well as a cast of "spirits" representing common industries in the valley: the Road Builder Spirit, the Spirit of the Sawmill, the Spirit of the Telephone, and the Spirit of the Creameries. Also included were characters that depicted flowers common to the valley: a pansy, a daisy, a sunflower, and a snowdrop.

== Communities ==
Populations for the tables below were taken from the U.S. 2020 Census unless otherwise indicated.

=== Communities, "Lower Valley" ===
Name	Status	Elevation (feet)	Elevation (meters)	Year Settled	Population
Alpine	incorporated town	5,633	1,717	1907	1,220
Bedford	census-designated place	6,263	1,909	1890	465
Etna	census-designated place	5,827	1,776	1879	185
Freedom, ID and WY	census-designated place	5,777	1,761	1879	247
Nordic	census-designated place	6,120	1,870		602^{1}
Star Valley Ranch	incorporated town	6,290	1,970		1,866
Thayne	incorporated town	5.906	1,800		380
Turnerville	census-designated place	6,434	1,961		192^{1}

^{1} Population information was taken from the 2010 Census.

=== Communities, "Upper Valley" ===
Name	Status	Elevation (feet)	Elevation (meters)	Year Settled	Population
Afton	incorporated town	6,240	1,902		2172
Auburn	census-designated place	6,073	1,851		375
Fairview	census-designated place	6,208	1,892	1885	277
Grover	census-designated place	6,152	1,875	1885	481
Osmond	census-designated place	6,296	1,919		397^{1}
Smoot	census-designated place	6,621	2,018		397^{1}

^{1} Population information was taken from the 2010 Census.

== Transportation ==
- US 89 runs north-south through the entire length of the valley
- WYO 236 connects Fairview and Afton in the Upper Valley
- WYO 237 connects Auburn and Grover in the Upper Valley
- WYO 238 forms western loop off US 89 through Auburn in the Upper Valley
- WYO 239 connects Freedom with US 89 in the Lower Valley
- WYO 241 forms western loop off US 89 through Osmond in the Upper Valley

== Religious significance ==
On October 1, 2011, Thomas S. Monson, president of the LDS Church, announced in General Conference that the Star Valley Wyoming Temple would be built in the valley. The location was announced on May 25, 2012, to be just east of U.S. Route 89 on the Haderlie Farm property just south of Afton. The temple was completed and dedicated on October 30, 2016, by LDS Apostle David A. Bednar, the 154th dedicated temple in operation.

== See also ==
- Intermittent Spring (Wyoming)
- Swift Creek (Wyoming)
- Salt River (Wyoming)
- Grey's River
- Snake River
