= Osmond, Wyoming =

- Census-designated place
- Location in the United States
- Coordinates: 42°40′40″N 110°56′27″W
- Country: United States
- State: Wyoming
- County: Lincoln

Area
  - Total: 3.2 sq mi (8.4 km^{2})
  - Land: 3.2 sq mi (8.4 km^{2})
  - Water: 0 sq mi (0.0 km^{2})
- Elevation: 6,329 ft (1,929 m)

Population (2010)
  - Total: 397
  - Density: 120/sq mi (47/km^{2})
- Time zone: UTC-7 (Mountain (MST))
  - Summer (DST): UTC-6 (MDT)
- ZIP code: 83110
- Area code: 307
- FIPS code: 56-58970
- GNIS feature ID: 2585083

Osmond is a census-designated place (CDP) in Lincoln County, Wyoming, United States. The population was 397 at the 2010 census.

== History ==
According to entertainer Marie Osmond, her paternal great-great-grandfather founded Osmond, Wyoming.

== Geography ==
Osmond is located in Star Valley on Wyoming Highway 241, 3 miles (5 km) south of the town of Afton. Highway 236 forms the northern edge of the community, and U.S. Route 89 forms the eastern edge. Osmond is 3 miles (5 km) east of the community of Fairview.

According to the United States Census Bureau, the CDP has a total area of 3.2 square miles (8.4 km^{2}), all land.

== Education ==
The community is in the Lincoln County School District 2.
