= Wyoming Valley (disambiguation) =

Wyoming Valley is a historic industrialized region of Northeastern Pennsylvania.

Wyoming Valley may also refer to:

- Wyoming County, New York
- Star Valley (Wyoming), in Wyoming and Idaho
