= Lincoln County School District Number 2 =

Public school district in Wyoming, United States

Lincoln County School District #2

Location
- Lincoln County, Wyoming United States

District information
- Grades: PK-12
- Superintendent: Matt Erickson
- NCES District ID: 3702680

Students and staff
- Students: 11,710
- Teachers: 767.45 (on an FTE basis)
- Staff: 805.13 (on an FTE basis)
- Student–teacher ratio: 15.26:1

Other information
- Website: lcsd2.org

Lincoln County School District #2 is a public school district based in Afton, Wyoming, United States.

== Governance ==
Lincoln County School District #2 follows a council-manager government where seven Board of Education members appoint a superintendent to carry out district operations on a daily basis. The current board members are Darnell Simpson (Chair), Jake Long, Lynn Call, Timothy Teichert, Jed Johnson, David Jenkins, Connie Day. The current superintendent is Matt Erickson.

== Geography ==
Lincoln County School District #2 serves the western portion of Lincoln County, including the following communities:

- Incorporated places
  - Town of Afton
  - Town of Alpine
  - Town of Cokeville
  - Town of Star Valley Ranch
  - Town of Thayne
- Census-designated places (Note: All census-designated places are unincorporated.)
  - Alpine Northeast
  - Alpine Northwest
  - Auburn
  - Bedford
  - Etna
  - Fairview
  - Freedom
  - Grover
  - Nordic
  - Osmond
  - Smoot
  - Taylor
  - Turnerville

== Schools ==
=== Secondary schools ===
- Grades 9-12
  - Star Valley High School
  - Swift Creek High School (Alternative)
- Grades 7-12
  - Cokeville High School (Also called Cokeville Jr/Sr High School.)
- Grades 7-8
  - Star Valley Middle School

=== Elementary schools ===
- Grades 4-6
  - Etna Elementary School
  - Osmond Elementary School
- Grades K-3
  - Thayne Elementary School
- Grades PK-3
  - Afton Elementary School
- Grades K-6
  - Cokeville Elementary School

== Student demographics ==
The following figures are as of October 1, 2009.

- Total District Enrollment: 2,640
- Student enrollment by gender
  - Male: 1,396 (52.88%)
  - Female: 1,244 (47.12%)
- Student enrollment by ethnicity
  - White: 2,474 (93.71%)
  - Hispanic or Latino: 107 (4.05%)
  - American Indian or Alaska Native: 16 (0.61%)
  - Black or African American: 11 (0.42%)
  - Asian: 7 (0.27%)
  - Native Hawaiian or Other Pacific Islander: 4 (0.15%)
  - Two or More Races: 21 (0.80%)

== See also ==
- List of school districts in Wyoming
