= Thayne, Wyoming =

Town in Lincoln County, Wyoming

- Town
- Location of Thayne in Lincoln County, Wyoming
- Coordinates: 42°55′10″N 111°00′09″W
- Country: United States
- State: Wyoming
- County: Lincoln

Area
  - Total: 1.48 sq mi (3.84 km^{2})
  - Land: 1.48 sq mi (3.84 km^{2})
  - Water: 0 sq mi (0.00 km^{2})
- Elevation: 5,906 ft (1,800 m)

Population (2020)
  - Total: 380
  - Density: 266.0/sq mi (102.72/km^{2})
- Time zone: UTC-7 (Mountain (MST))
  - Summer (DST): UTC-6 (MDT)
- ZIP code: 83127
- Area code: 307
- FIPS code: 56-76370
- GNIS feature ID: 2413383
- Website: www.thayne-wy.com

Thayne is a town in Lincoln County, Wyoming, United States. The population was 380 at the 2020 census.

== Geography ==
Thayne is located in the northern portion of Wyoming's grassy Star Valley, close to the Salt River. Thayne is surrounded by green grassland and ranches, with forested mountains at the valley's edge.

According to the United States Census Bureau, the town has a total area of 1.39 square miles (3.60 km^{2}), all land.

== Demographics ==
Historical population
Census	Pop.	Note	%±
1950	229		—
1960	214		−6.6%
1970	195		−8.9%
1980	256		31.3%
1990	267		4.3%
2000	341		27.7%
2010	366		7.3%
2020	380		3.8%
U.S. Decennial Census

=== 2010 census ===
As of the census of 2010, there were 366 people, 144 households, and 90 families living in the town. The population density was 263.3 inhabitants per square mile (101.7/km^{2}). There were 171 housing units at an average density of 123.0 per square mile (47.5/km^{2}). The racial makeup of the town was 91.5% White, 1.1% Asian, 6.0% from other races, and 1.4% from two or more races. Hispanic or Latino of any race were 9.3% of the population.

There were 144 households, of which 35.4% had children under the age of 18 living with them, 49.3% were married couples living together, 9.0% had a female householder with no husband present, 4.2% had a male householder with no wife present, and 37.5% were non-families. 31.9% of all households were made up of individuals, and 11.2% had someone living alone who was 65 years of age or older. The average household size was 2.54 and the average family size was 3.22.

The median age in the town was 35.6 years. 27.6% of residents were under the age of 18; 8.1% were between the ages of 18 and 24; 24.6% were from 25 to 44; 28.7% were from 45 to 64; and 10.9% were 65 years of age or older. The gender makeup of the town was 53.0% male and 47.0% female.

== Education ==
Public education in the town of Thayne is provided by Lincoln County School District #2.

Thayne has a public library, a branch of the Lincoln County Library System.

== See also ==
- List of municipalities in Wyoming
