= Mountain View, Natrona County, Wyoming =

Census-designated place in Natrona County, Wyoming, United States

Mountain View, Wyoming
- Census-designated place
- Location within the state of Wyoming
- Coordinates: 42°51′13″N 106°23′19″W
- Country: United States
- State: Wyoming
- County: Natrona

Area
  - Total: 3.8 sq mi (9.8 km^{2})
  - Land: 3.8 sq mi (9.8 km^{2})
  - Water: 0.0 sq mi (0 km^{2})
- Elevation: 5,200 ft (1,600 m)

Population (2010)
  - Total: 96
  - Density: 25/sq mi (9.8/km^{2})
- Time zone: UTC-7 (Mountain (MST))
  - Summer (DST): UTC-6 (MDT)
- Area code: 307
- FIPS code: 56-55200
- GNIS feature ID: 2408885

Mountain View is a census-designated place in Natrona County, Wyoming, United States. It is part of the Casper, Wyoming Metropolitan Statistical Area. The population was 96 at the 2010 census.

== Geography ==
According to the United States Census Bureau, the CDP has a total area of 3.8 square miles (9.9 km^{2}), all land.

== Demographics ==
As of the census of 2000, there were 103 people, 46 households, and 25 families residing in the CDP. The population density was 27.0 people per square mile (10.4/km^{2}). There were 58 housing units at an average density of 15.2/sq mi (5.9/km^{2}). The racial makeup of the CDP was 91.26% White, 1.94% Native American, 0.97% Pacific Islander, 1.94% from other races, and 3.88% from two or more races. Hispanic or Latino of any race were 6.80% of the population.

There were 46 households, out of which 15.2% had children under the age of 18 living with them, 41.3% were married couples living together, 2.2% had a female householder with no husband present, and 43.5% were non-families. 37.0% of all households were made up of individuals, and 17.4% had someone living alone who was 65 years of age or older. The average household size was 2.11 and the average family size was 2.77.

In the CDP, the population was spread out, with 15.5% under the age of 18, 6.8% from 18 to 24, 31.1% from 25 to 44, 31.1% from 45 to 64, and 15.5% who were 65 years of age or older. The median age was 44 years. For every 100 females, there were 119.1 males. For every 100 females age 18 and over, there were 112.2 males.

The median income for a household in the CDP was $28,068, and the median income for a family was $28,636. Males had a median income of $26,111 versus $0 for females. The per capita income for the CDP was $11,754. There were no families and 7.1% of the population living below the poverty line, including no under eighteens and none of those over 64.

== See also ==
- List of census-designated places in Wyoming
