= Nordic, Wyoming =

- Census-designated place
- Location in the United States
- Coordinates: 43°04′47″N 110°59′48″W
- Country: United States
- State: Wyoming
- County: Lincoln

Area
  - Total: 5.1 sq mi (13.1 km^{2})
  - Land: 5.1 sq mi (13.1 km^{2})
  - Water: 0 sq mi (0.0 km^{2})
- Elevation: 6,120 ft (1,870 m)

Population (2010)
  - Total: 602
  - Density: 119/sq mi (46.0/km^{2})
- Time zone: UTC-7 (Mountain (MST))
  - Summer (DST): UTC-6 (MDT)
- ZIP code: 83118
- Area code: 307
- FIPS code: 56-56520
- GNIS feature ID: 2631322

Nordic is a census-designated place (CDP) in Lincoln County, Wyoming, United States. The population was 602 at the 2010 census.

== Geography ==
Nordic is located on U.S. Route 89, 7 miles (11 km) south of the town of Alpine.

According to the United States Census Bureau, the CDP has a total area of 5.1 square miles (13.1 km^{2}), all land.

== Education ==
It is in the Lincoln County School District 2.
