= Brookhurst, Wyoming =

Census-designated place in Natrona County, Wyoming, United States

- Census-designated place
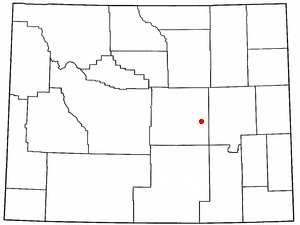
- Location of Brookhurst, Wyoming
- Coordinates: 42°51′43″N 106°13′38″W
- Country: United States
- State: Wyoming
- County: Natrona

Area
  - Total: 0.7 sq mi (1.8 km^{2})
  - Land: 0.6 sq mi (1.6 km^{2})
  - Water: 0.04 sq mi (0.10 km^{2})
- Elevation: 5,118 ft (1,560 m)

Population (2010)
  - Total: 185
  - Density: 310/sq mi (120/km^{2})
- Time zone: UTC-7 (Mountain (MST))
  - Summer (DST): UTC-6 (MDT)
- Area code: 307
- FIPS code: 56-10175
- GNIS feature ID: 2407908

Brookhurst is a census-designated place (CDP) in Natrona County, Wyoming, United States. It is part of the Casper, Wyoming Metropolitan Statistical Area. The population was 185 at the 2010 census.

== Geography ==
According to the United States Census Bureau, the CDP has a total area of 0.67 square mile (1.7 km^{2}), of which 0.63 square mile (1.6 km^{2}) is land and 0.04 square mile (0.1 km^{2}) (6.14%) is water.

== Demographics ==
As of the census of 2000, there were 192 people, 73 households, and 58 families residing in the CDP. The population density was 140.2 people per square mile (54.1/km^{2}). There were 81 housing units at an average density of 59.1/sq mi (22.8/km^{2}). The racial makeup of the CDP was 94.79% White, 3.12% Native American, 1.56% from other races, and 0.52% from two or more races. Hispanic or Latino of any race were 3.65% of the population.

There were 73 households, out of which 32.9% had children under the age of 18 living with them, 67.1% were married couples living together, 8.2% had a female householder with no husband present, and 20.5% were non-families. 13.7% of all households were made up of individuals, and 1.4% had someone living alone who was 65 years of age or older. The average household size was 2.63 and the average family size was 2.86.

In the CDP, the population was spread out, with 26.0% under the age of 18, 4.7% from 18 to 24, 31.8% from 25 to 44, 27.1% from 45 to 64, and 10.4% who were 65 years of age or older. The median age was 38 years. For every 100 females, there were 93.9 males. For every 100 females age 18 and over, there were 111.9 males.

The median income for a household in the CDP was $38,828, and the median income for a family was $45,833. Males had a median income of $29,432 versus $26,354 for females. The per capita income for the CDP was $23,219. About 6.1% of families and 9.2% of the population were below the poverty line, including none of those under the age of eighteen or sixty five or over.

== See also ==
- List of census-designated places in Wyoming
