= Star Valley Ranch, Wyoming =

Town in Lincoln County, Wyoming, United States

- Town
- Location of Star Valley Ranch in Lincoln County, Wyoming
- Coordinates: 42°59′20″N 110°58′09″W
- Country: United States
- State: Wyoming
- County: Lincoln
- Incorporated: November 8, 2005

Area
  - Total: 2.72 sq mi (7.04 km^{2})
  - Land: 2.71 sq mi (7.03 km^{2})
  - Water: 0.0039 sq mi (0.01 km^{2})

Population (2020)
  - Total: 1,866
  - Density: 611/sq mi (235.9/km^{2})
- Time zone: UTC-7 (Mountain (MST))
  - Summer (DST): UTC-6 (MDT)
- ZIP code: 83127
- Area code: 307
- FIPS code: 56-73180
- GNIS feature ID: 2413329
- Website: www.starvalleyranchwy.org

Star Valley Ranch is a town in Lincoln County, Wyoming, United States. The population was 1,866 at the 2020 census. It was incorporated on November 8, 2005.

== Geography ==
Star Valley Ranch is located in the Star Valley, a grassland valley surrounded by forested mountains.

According to the United States Census Bureau, the town has a total area of 2.70 square miles (6.99 km^{2}), all land.

== Demographics ==
Historical population
Census	Pop.	Note	%±
2000	776		—
2010	1,503		93.7%
2020	1,866		24.2%
U.S. Decennial Census

=== 2010 census ===
As of the census of 2010, there were 1,503 people, 612 households, and 461 families residing in the town. The population density was 556.7 inhabitants per square mile (214.9/km^{2}). There were 954 housing units at an average density of 353.3 units per square mile (136.4 units/km^{2}). The racial makeup of the town was 96.3% White, 0.1% African American, 0.8% Native American, 0.6% Asian, 1.3% from other races, and 0.8% from two or more races. Hispanic or Latino of any race were 3.4% of the population.

There were 612 households, of which 28.3% had children under the age of 18 living with them, 70.1% were married couples living together, 2.9% had a female householder with no husband present, 2.3% had a male householder with no wife present, and 24.7% were non-families. 19.6% of all households were made up of individuals, and 8.7% had someone living alone who was 65 years of age or older. The average household size was 2.46 and the average family size was 2.83.

The median age in the town was 43.2 years. 23.8% of residents were under the age of 18; 2.9% were between the ages of 18 and 24; 25.4% were from 25 to 44; 26.2% were from 45 to 64; and 21.8% were 65 years of age or older. The gender makeup of the town was 51.8% male and 48.2% female.

=== 2000 census ===
As of the census of 2000, there were 776 people, 357 households, and 292 families residing in the CDP. The population density was 61.1 people per square mile (23.6 people/km^{2}). There were 856 housing units at an average density of 67.4 units per square mile (26.0 units/km^{2}). The racial makeup of the CDP was 97.68% White, 0.13% African American, 0.77% Native American, 0.26% from other races, and 1.16% from two or more races. Hispanic or Latino of any race were 0.39% of the population.

There were 357 households, out of which 12.0% had children under the age of 18 living with them, 78.7% were married couples living together, 2.8% had a female householder with no husband present, and 18.2% were non-families. 12.9% of all households were made up of individuals, and 7.0% had someone living alone who was 65 years of age or older. The average household size was 2.17 and the average family size was 2.36.

In the CDP, the population was spread out, with 11.5% under the age of 18, 2.4% from 18 to 24, 12.4% from 25 to 44, 36.1% from 45 to 64, and 37.6% who were 65 years of age or older. The median age was 61 years. For every 100 females, there were 101.0 males. For every 100 females age 18 and over, there were 99.7 males.

The median income for a household in the CDP was $47,981, and the median income for a family was $58,036. Males had a median income of $40,313 versus $32,083 for females. The per capita income for the CDP was $28,635. None of the families and 3.9% of the population were living below the poverty line, including no under eighteens and 8.8% of those over 64.

== Education ==
Public education in the town of Star Valley Ranch is provided by Lincoln County School District #2.

Star Valley Ranch has a public library, a branch of the Lincoln County Library System.

== See also ==
- List of municipalities in Wyoming
