= Bedford, Wyoming =

Census-designated place in Lincoln County, Wyoming, United States

- Census-designated place
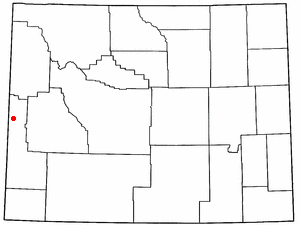
- Location of Bedford, Wyoming
- Coordinates: 42°53′41″N 110°55′43″W
- Country: United States
- State: Wyoming
- County: Lincoln

Area
  - Total: 1.3 sq mi (3.4 km^{2})
  - Land: 1.3 sq mi (3.4 km^{2})
  - Water: 0.0 sq mi (0 km^{2})
- Elevation: 6,263 ft (1,909 m)

Population (2020)
  - Total: 465
  - Density: 360/sq mi (140/km^{2})
- Time zone: UTC-7 (Mountain (MST))
  - Summer (DST): UTC-6 (MDT)
- ZIP code: 83112
- Area code: 307
- FIPS code: 56-06045
- GNIS feature ID: 2407821

Bedford is a census-designated place (CDP) in Lincoln County, Wyoming, United States. The population was 465 at the 2020 census.

== History ==
The first settlement at Bedford was made in 1890. A post office in Bedford was established in 1898, and remained in operation until 1966. The community was named after Bedford, Bedfordshire, England.

== Demographics ==
As of the census of 2000, there were 169 people, 63 households, and 49 families residing in the CDP. The population density was 75.5 people per square mile (29.1/km^{2}). There were 73 housing units at an average density of 32.6/sq mi (12.6/km^{2}). The racial makeup of the CDP was 97.04% White, 1.18% Native American, 0.59% from other races, and 1.18% from two or more races. Hispanic or Latino of any race were 1.18% of the population.

There were 63 households, out of which 23.8% had children under the age of 18 living with them, 69.8% were married couples living together, 6.3% had a female householder with no husband present, and 22.2% were non-families. 15.9% of all households were made up of individuals, and 12.7% had someone living alone who was 65 years of age or older. The average household size was 2.68, and the average family size was 3.04.

In the CDP, the population was spread out, with 28.4% under the age of 18, 3.6% from 18 to 24, 20.1% from 25 to 44, 26.6% from 45 to 64, and 21.3% who were 65 years of age or older. The median age was 42 years. For every 100 females, there were 89.9 males. For every 100 females age 18 and over, there were 101.7 males.

The median income for a household in the CDP was $40,469, and the median income for a family was $40,625. Males had a median income of $36,176 versus $20,625 for females. The per capita income for the CDP was $29,976. None of the population or families were below the poverty line.

== Geography ==
Bedford is located in the Star Valley, a grassland valley surrounded by forested mountains.

According to the United States Census Bureau, the CDP has a total area of 1.3 square miles (3.4 km^{2}), all land.

=== Climate ===
According to the Köppen Climate Classification system, Bedford has a warm-summer humid continental climate, abbreviated "Dfb" on climate maps. The hottest temperature recorded in Bedford was 98 °F (37 °C) on August 7, 2001, while the coldest temperature recorded was −38 °F (−39 °C) on January 1, 1979.

Climate data for Bedford, Wyoming, 1991–2020 normals, extremes 1975–present
Month	Jan	Feb	Mar	Apr	May	Jun	Jul	Aug	Sep	Oct	Nov	Dec	Year
Record high °F (°C)	52 (11)	54 (12)	63 (17)	77 (25)	90 (32)	92 (33)	97 (36)	98 (37)	90 (32)	82 (28)	71 (22)	60 (16)	98 (37)
Mean maximum °F (°C)	41.6 (5.3)	45.8 (7.7)	54.0 (12.2)	66.4 (19.1)	76.1 (24.5)	84.0 (28.9)	88.6 (31.4)	88.0 (31.1)	83.0 (28.3)	73.2 (22.9)	57.9 (14.4)	44.0 (6.7)	89.6 (32.0)
Mean daily maximum °F (°C)	28.3 (−2.1)	32.8 (0.4)	41.7 (5.4)	49.5 (9.7)	60.6 (15.9)	70.5 (21.4)	80.2 (26.8)	79.3 (26.3)	70.3 (21.3)	55.8 (13.2)	40.0 (4.4)	28.3 (−2.1)	53.1 (11.7)
Daily mean °F (°C)	17.3 (−8.2)	20.2 (−6.6)	28.6 (−1.9)	36.5 (2.5)	46.5 (8.1)	53.8 (12.1)	61.5 (16.4)	60.3 (15.7)	52.4 (11.3)	40.9 (4.9)	28.1 (−2.2)	17.5 (−8.1)	38.6 (3.7)
Mean daily minimum °F (°C)	6.4 (−14.2)	7.5 (−13.6)	15.6 (−9.1)	23.4 (−4.8)	32.4 (0.2)	37.1 (2.8)	42.8 (6.0)	41.3 (5.2)	34.4 (1.3)	25.9 (−3.4)	16.1 (−8.8)	6.7 (−14.1)	24.1 (−4.4)
Mean minimum °F (°C)	−16.3 (−26.8)	−12.4 (−24.7)	−3.1 (−19.5)	10.2 (−12.1)	22.3 (−5.4)	28.3 (−2.1)	34.1 (1.2)	32.0 (0.0)	23.7 (−4.6)	10.9 (−11.7)	−3.5 (−19.7)	−13.6 (−25.3)	−20.6 (−29.2)
Record low °F (°C)	−38 (−39)	−31 (−35)	−22 (−30)	−2 (−19)	12 (−11)	17 (−8)	18 (−8)	24 (−4)	10 (−12)	−11 (−24)	−19 (−28)	−37 (−38)	−38 (−39)
Average precipitation inches (mm)	2.52 (64)	2.54 (65)	2.25 (57)	2.28 (58)	3.08 (78)	2.22 (56)	1.09 (28)	1.26 (32)	1.70 (43)	2.10 (53)	2.13 (54)	2.10 (53)	25.27 (641)
Average snowfall inches (cm)	37.0 (94)	28.5 (72)	20.9 (53)	9.1 (23)	3.6 (9.1)	0.4 (1.0)	0.0 (0.0)	0.0 (0.0)	0.9 (2.3)	5.3 (13)	23.5 (60)	32.5 (83)	161.7 (410.4)
Average precipitation days (≥ 0.01 in)	12.4	11.2	11.1	10.6	12.1	9.4	6.0	6.7	7.3	8.8	10.6	12.3	118.5
Average snowy days (≥ 0.1 in)	12.0	10.5	7.4	3.6	1.0	0.1	0.0	0.0	0.2	2.3	7.8	11.3	56.2
Source 1: NOAA
Source 2: National Weather Service

== Education ==
Public education in the community of Bedford is provided by Lincoln County School District #2.

== See also ==
- List of census-designated places in Wyoming
