= Freedom, Idaho and Wyoming =

- Census-designated place
- Location within Wyoming Location within the United States
- Coordinates: 42°59′48″N 111°01′52″W
- Country: United States
- States: Idaho and Wyoming
- Counties: Caribou (Idaho) and Lincoln (Wyoming)

Area
  - Total: 4.0 sq mi (10 km^{2})
  - Land: 4.0 sq mi (10 km^{2})
  - Water: 0.0 sq mi (0 km^{2})
- Elevation: 5,777 ft (1,761 m)

Population (2020)
  - Total: 247
  - Density: 62/sq mi (24/km^{2})
- Time zone: UTC-7 (Mountain (MST))
  - Summer (DST): UTC-6 (MDT)
- ZIP code: 83120
- FIPS code: 56-30115
- GNIS feature ID: 2631321

Freedom is an unincorporated community in both northeastern Caribou County, Idaho, and northwestern Lincoln County, Wyoming, in the United States; the Wyoming portion of the community is also a census-designated place (CDP). The population was 247 at the 2020 census.

== Geography ==
Located on U.S. Route 89 and Idaho State Highway 34, Freedom sits on the Idaho/Wyoming state line. It lies northeast of the city of Soda Springs, the county seat of Caribou County, and north of Kemmerer, the county seat of Lincoln County; the nearest significant community is Afton, Wyoming, approximately 20 miles (32 km) to the south, along U.S. Route 89. Although Freedom is unincorporated, its Wyoming side has a post office, with the ZIP code of 83120.

According to the United States Census Bureau, the CDP has a total area of 4.0 sq mi (10 km^{2}), all land.

== History ==
Freedom was established in 1879, and is the oldest settlement in the Star Valley. Similar to Colorado City, Arizona and Hildale, Utah, the community was settled as a border town by Mormon polygamists in order to escape arrest for polygamy: they could be free from Idaho police simply by walking into Wyoming. The community was named for the freedom it gave these early settlers.

At one time, Freedom was the largest settlement in the Star Valley. There was a general store, a gas station, a billiard hall, and other establishments. Today some of the old buildings still stand, but very few are still in use. The Post Office and Baseball Park are still used, along with the LDS Church, which was built in 1889. The headquarters of Freedom Arms, a gun factory and maker of a .454 Casull handgun, is located in the Wyoming portion of the community.

== Demographics ==
The population of the ZCTA for ZIP Code 83120 was 471 at the 2000 census, with a racial makeup of 98.5% White, and 1.5% some other race.

== Education ==
The Freedom, Wyoming census-designated place is in Lincoln County School District 2.

== Notable people ==
- Rulon Gardner, Greco-Roman wrestler who was born and raised in Star Valley.
- Randall Luthi, the former Speaker of the Wyoming House of Representatives resides in Freedom.
