= Grover, Wyoming =

Census-designated place in Lincoln County, Wyoming, United States

- Census-designated place

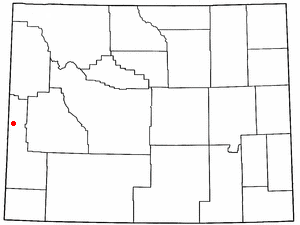
- Location of Grover, Wyoming
- Coordinates: 42°48′07″N 110°56′26″W
- Country: United States
- State: Wyoming
- County: Lincoln

Area
  - Total: 0.85 sq mi (2.2 km^{2})
  - Land: 0.85 sq mi (2.2 km^{2})
  - Water: 0 sq mi (0.0 km^{2})
- Elevation: 6,148 ft (1,874 m)

Population (2020)
  - Total: 481
  - Density: 570/sq mi (220/km^{2})
- Time zone: UTC-7 (Mountain (MST))
  - Summer (DST): UTC-6 (MDT)
- ZIP code: 83122
- Area code: 307
- FIPS code: 56-34030
- GNIS feature ID: 2408340

Grover is a census-designated place (CDP) in Lincoln County, Wyoming, United States. The population was 481 at the 2020 census.

== History ==
The first settlement at Grover was made in 1885. A post office called Grover has been in operation since 1889. The community was named after Grover Cleveland, 22nd and 24th President of the United States.

== Geography ==
Grover is located in the Star Valley, a grassland valley surrounded by forested mountains.

According to the United States Census Bureau, the CDP has a total area of 0.9 square mile (2.2 km^{2}), all land.

== Demographics ==
As of the census of 2000, there were 137 people, 48 households, and 38 families residing in the CDP. The population density was 159.0 people per square mile (61.5/km^{2}). There were 56 housing units at an average density of 65.0/sq mi (25.1/km^{2}). The racial makeup of the CDP was 96.35% White, 0.73% Asian, and 2.92% from two or more races. Hispanic or Latino of any race were 2.92% of the population.

There were 48 households, out of which 43.8% had children under the age of 18 living with them, 79.2% were married couples living together, and 20.8% were non-families. 20.8% of all households were made up of individuals, and 12.5% had someone living alone who was 65 years of age or older. The average household size was 2.85 and the average family size was 3.32.

In the CDP, the population was spread out, with 27.7% under the age of 18, 15.3% from 18 to 24, 20.4% from 25 to 44, 25.5% from 45 to 64, and 10.9% who were 65 years of age or older. The median age was 36 years. For every 100 females, there were 101.5 males. For every 100 females age 18 and over, there were 102.0 males.

The median income for a household in the CDP was $32,500, and the median income for a family was $34,250. Males had a median income of $29,375 versus $20,625 for females. The per capita income for the CDP was $15,687. None of the population and none of the families were below the poverty line.

== Education ==
Public education in the community of Grover is provided by Lincoln County School District #2.

== See also ==
- List of census-designated places in Wyoming
