= Alpine Northwest, Wyoming =

- Census-designated place
- Location within Wyoming Location within the United States
- Coordinates: 43°10′54″N 111°02′05″W
- Country: United States
- State: Wyoming
- County: Lincoln

Area
  - Total: 1.4 sq mi (3.7 km^{2})
  - Land: 1.4 sq mi (3.7 km^{2})
  - Water: 0 sq mi (0.0 km^{2})

Population (2020)
  - Total: 305
  - Density: 210/sq mi (82/km^{2})
- Time zone: UTC-7 (Mountain (MST))
  - Summer (DST): UTC-6 (MDT)
- Area code: 307
- FIPS code: 56-01936
- GNIS feature ID: 2407728

Alpine Northwest is a census-designated place (CDP) in Lincoln County, Wyoming, United States. The population was 305 at the 2020 census.

== Geography ==
Alpine Northwest is located on U.S. Route 26 (US 26) just north of Alpine, Wyoming, on the east shore of Palisades Reservoir.

According to the United States Census Bureau, the CDP has a total area of 1.5 square miles (3.8 km^{2}), of which 1.4 square miles (3.7 km^{2}) is land and 0.69% is water.

== Demographics ==
As of the census of 2000, there were 152 people, 77 households, and 45 families residing in the CDP. The population density was 106.0 people per square mile (41.0/km^{2}). There were 118 housing units at an average density of 82.3/sq mi (31.9/km^{2}). The racial makeup of the CDP was 97.37% White, 0.66% Native American, 0.66% Pacific Islander, and 1.32% from two or more races. Hispanic or Latino of any race were 2.63% of the population.

There were 77 households, out of which 13.0% had children under the age of 18 living with them, 55.8% were married couples living together, 3.9% had a female householder with no husband present, and 40.3% were non-families. 31.2% of all households were made up of individuals, and 1.3% had someone living alone who was 65 years of age or older. The average household size was 1.97 and the average family size was 2.43.

In the CDP, the population was spread out, with 11.2% under the age of 18, 5.3% from 18 to 24, 34.9% from 25 to 44, 35.5% from 45 to 64, and 13.2% who were 65 years of age or older. The median age was 44 years. For every 100 females, there were 105.4 males. For every 100 females age 18 and over, there were 107.7 males.

The median income for a household in the CDP was $40,250, and the median income for a family was $65,167. Males had a median income of $50,208 versus $37,917 for females. The per capita income for the CDP was $22,948. None of the families and 3.3% of the population were living below the poverty line.

== Education ==
Public education in the community of Alpine Northwest is provided by Lincoln County School District #2.
