= Smoot, Wyoming =

Ceneus-designated place in Lincoln County, Wyoming

- Census-designated place
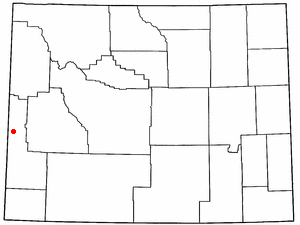
- Location of Smoot, Wyoming
- Coordinates: 42°37′25″N 110°55′18″W
- Country: United States
- State: Wyoming
- County: Lincoln

Area
  - Total: 1.7 sq mi (4.4 km^{2})
  - Land: 1.7 sq mi (4.4 km^{2})
  - Water: 0 sq mi (0.0 km^{2})
- Elevation: 6,621 ft (2,018 m)

Population (2010)
  - Total: 195
  - Density: 110/sq mi (44/km^{2})
- Time zone: UTC-7 (Mountain (MST))
  - Summer (DST): UTC-6 (MDT)
- ZIP code: 83126
- Area code: 307
- FIPS code: 56-71440
- GNIS feature ID: 2408750

Smoot is a census-designated place (CDP) in Lincoln County, Wyoming, United States. The population was 195 at the 2010 census.

== Demographics ==
As of the census of 2000, there were 182 people, 55 households, and 44 families residing in the CDP. The population density was 106.4 people per square mile (41.1/km^{2}). There were 63 housing units at an average density of 36.8/sq mi (14.2/km^{2}). The racial makeup of the CDP was 95.60% White, 0.55% Native American, 1.10% from other races, and 2.75% from two or more races. Hispanic or Latino of any race were 4.95% of the population.

There were 55 households, out of which 43.6% had children under the age of 18 living with them, 74.5% were married couples living together, 1.8% had a female householder with no husband present, and 20.0% were non-families. 18.2% of all households were made up of individuals, and 10.9% had someone living alone who was 65 years of age or older. The average household size was 3.31 and the average family size was 3.84.

In the CDP, the population was spread out, with 35.2% under the age of 18, 9.3% from 18 to 24, 23.1% from 25 to 44, 22.0% from 45 to 64, and 10.4% who were 65 years of age or older. The median age was 31 years. For every 100 females, there were 95.7 males. For every 100 females age 18 and over, there were 84.4 males.

The median income for a household in the CDP was $32,273, and the median income for a family was $41,250. Males had a median income of $41,250 versus $21,000 for females. The per capita income for the CDP was $12,005. About 8.0% of families and 19.6% of the population were below the poverty line, including 48.3% of those under the age of eighteen and none of those 65 or over.

== Geography ==
Smoot is located in the Star Valley Wyoming eight miles south of Afton.

According to the United States Census Bureau, the CDP has a total area of 1.7 square miles (4.5 km^{2}), all of it land.

=== Climate ===
Salt River (Wyoming) Pass (WY-89) rises out of Smoot to the south, reaching a maximum elevation of 7630 feet (2326 m). The weather station at the summit of Salt River Pass has a humid continental climate (Köppen Dfb), bordering on a subarctic climate (Köppen Dfc). The winters are long and cold, with very high amounts of snowfall.

Climate data for Salt River Summit, Wyoming, 1991–2020 normals, extremes 1988–2020: 7760ft (2365m)
| Month | Jan | Feb | Mar | Apr | May | Jun | Jul | Aug | Sep | Oct | Nov | Dec | Year |
|---|---|---|---|---|---|---|---|---|---|---|---|---|---|
| Record high °F (°C) | 50 (10) | 60 (16) | 65 (18) | 76 (24) | 84 (29) | 90 (32) | 92 (33) | 94 (34) | 88 (31) | 77 (25) | 63 (17) | 55 (13) | 94 (34) |
| Mean maximum °F (°C) | 44.2 (6.8) | 47.1 (8.4) | 56.4 (13.6) | 66.4 (19.1) | 74.0 (23.3) | 81.9 (27.7) | 87.1 (30.6) | 86.3 (30.2) | 80.3 (26.8) | 69.2 (20.7) | 55.8 (13.2) | 44.1 (6.7) | 87.8 (31.0) |
| Mean daily maximum °F (°C) | 29.5 (−1.4) | 32.7 (0.4) | 41.5 (5.3) | 48.6 (9.2) | 57.9 (14.4) | 67.8 (19.9) | 77.6 (25.3) | 76.6 (24.8) | 66.3 (19.1) | 51.3 (10.7) | 37.5 (3.1) | 28.4 (−2.0) | 51.3 (10.7) |
| Daily mean °F (°C) | 22.2 (−5.4) | 24.3 (−4.3) | 31.6 (−0.2) | 37.7 (3.2) | 46.5 (8.1) | 55.1 (12.8) | 64.1 (17.8) | 63.2 (17.3) | 54.1 (12.3) | 41.5 (5.3) | 29.6 (−1.3) | 21.6 (−5.8) | 41.0 (5.0) |
| Mean daily minimum °F (°C) | 14.9 (−9.5) | 15.8 (−9.0) | 21.7 (−5.7) | 26.9 (−2.8) | 35.2 (1.8) | 42.4 (5.8) | 50.7 (10.4) | 49.7 (9.8) | 41.8 (5.4) | 31.7 (−0.2) | 21.7 (−5.7) | 14.8 (−9.6) | 30.6 (−0.8) |
| Mean minimum °F (°C) | −2.1 (−18.9) | −1.0 (−18.3) | 6.4 (−14.2) | 14.3 (−9.8) | 22.6 (−5.2) | 30.2 (−1.0) | 41.1 (5.1) | 39.4 (4.1) | 28.2 (−2.1) | 16.5 (−8.6) | 4.4 (−15.3) | −4.0 (−20.0) | −8.5 (−22.5) |
| Record low °F (°C) | −14 (−26) | −20 (−29) | −6 (−21) | 2 (−17) | 13 (−11) | 24 (−4) | 32 (0) | 30 (−1) | 17 (−8) | −2 (−19) | −15 (−26) | −27 (−33) | −27 (−33) |
| Average precipitation inches (mm) | 3.19 (81) | 2.89 (73) | 2.59 (66) | 2.27 (58) | 2.66 (68) | 1.85 (47) | 1.01 (26) | 1.14 (29) | 1.64 (42) | 2.00 (51) | 2.27 (58) | 3.10 (79) | 26.61 (678) |
| Average snowfall inches (cm) | 39.3 (100) | 36.1 (92) | 24.4 (62) | 20.0 (51) | 4.8 (12) | 0.8 (2.0) | 0.0 (0.0) | 0.0 (0.0) | 1.0 (2.5) | 9.5 (24) | 23.4 (59) | 39.8 (101) | 199.1 (505.5) |
Source 1: XMACIS2 (normals, records & Smoot 4.9 2005–2022 snowfall)
Source 2: NOAA (Salt River Summit precipitation)

== Education ==
Public education in the community of Smoot is provided by Lincoln County School District #2.

== See also ==
- List of census-designated places in Wyoming
