= Oakley, Wyoming =

- Census-designated place
- Location within Wyoming Location within the United States
- Coordinates: 41°44′57″N 110°31′33″W
- Country: United States
- State: Wyoming
- County: Lincoln

Area
  - Total: 0.2 sq mi (0.52 km^{2})
  - Land: 0.2 sq mi (0.52 km^{2})
  - Water: 0.0 sq mi (0 km^{2})

Population (2010)
  - Total: 49
  - Density: 250/sq mi (95/km^{2})
- Time zone: UTC-7 (Mountain (MST))
  - Summer (DST): UTC-6 (MDT)
- Area code: 307
- FIPS code: 56-57375
- GNIS feature ID: 2408969

Oakley is a census-designated place (CDP) in Lincoln County, Wyoming, United States. The population was 49 at the 2010 census.

== Geography ==
According to the United States Census Bureau, the CDP has a total area of 0.18 square mile (0.47 km^{2}), all land.

== Demographics ==
As of the census of 2000, there were 18 people, 9 households, and 5 families residing in the CDP. The population density was 308.0 people per square mile (115.8/km^{2}). There were 10 housing units at an average density of 171.1/sq mi (64.4/km^{2}). The racial makeup of the CDP was 94.44% White, 5.56% from other races. Hispanic or Latino of any race were 5.56% of the population.

There were 9 households, out of which 11.1% had children under the age of 18 living with them, 44.4% were married couples living together, and 44.4% were non-families. 44.4% of all households were made up of individuals, and 22.2% had someone living alone who was 65 years of age or older. The average household size was 2.00 and the average family size was 2.80.

In the CDP, the population was spread out, with 11.1% under the age of 18, 5.6% from 18 to 24, 27.8% from 25 to 44, 38.9% from 45 to 64, and 16.7% who were 65 years of age or older. The median age was 48 years. For every 100 females, there were 125.0 males. For every 100 females age 18 and over, there were 128.6 males.

The median income for a household in the CDP was $63,333, and the median income for a family was $64,167. Males had a median income of $41,667 versus $9,063 for females. The per capita income for the CDP was $16,311. There were no families and 10.5% of the population living below the poverty line, including no under eighteens and 40.0% of those over 64.

== Education ==
It is within Lincoln County School District 1.
