= Taylor, Wyoming =

- Census-designated place
- Location within Wyoming Location within the United States
- Coordinates: 42°04′11″N 110°59′55″W
- Country: United States
- State: Wyoming
- County: Lincoln

Area
  - Total: 2.5 sq mi (6.6 km^{2})
  - Land: 2.5 sq mi (6.6 km^{2})
  - Water: 0 sq mi (0.0 km^{2})

Population (2010)
  - Total: 90
  - Density: 35/sq mi (14/km^{2})
- Time zone: UTC-7 (Mountain (MST))
  - Summer (DST): UTC-6 (MDT)
- Area code: 307
- FIPS code: 56-75572
- GNIS feature ID: 2410060

Taylor is a census-designated place (CDP) in Lincoln County, Wyoming, United States. The population was 90 at the 2010 census.

== Geography ==
According to the United States Census Bureau, the CDP has a total area of 2.6 square miles (6.7 km^{2}), all land.

== Demographics ==
As of the census of 2000, there were 90 people, 27 households, and 23 families residing in the CDP. The population density was 35.1 people per square mile (13.6/km^{2}). There were 28 housing units at an average density of 10.9/sq mi (4.2/km^{2}). The racial makeup of the CDP was 93.33% White, 1.11% Native American, 2.22% Pacific Islander, and 3.33% from two or more races.

There were 27 households, out of which 40.7% had children under the age of 18 living with them, 74.1% were married couples living together, 3.7% had a female householder with no husband present, and 14.8% were non-families. 11.1% of all households were made up of individuals, and none had someone living alone who was 65 years of age or older. The average household size was 3.33 and the average family size was 3.65.

In the CDP, the population was spread out, with 40.0% under the age of 18, 5.6% from 18 to 24, 24.4% from 25 to 44, 23.3% from 45 to 64, and 6.7% who were 65 years of age or older. The median age was 29 years. For every 100 females, there were 80.0 males. For every 100 females age 18 and over, there were 107.7 males.

The median income for a household in the CDP was $38,000, and the median income for a family was $35,625. Males had a median income of $25,313 versus $13,750 for females. The per capita income for the CDP was $12,836. There were 16.7% of families and 20.7% of the population living below the poverty line, including 32.0% of under eighteens and none of those over 64.

== Education ==
Public education in the community of Taylor is provided by Lincoln County School District #2.
