= Auburn, Wyoming =

Census-designated place in Lincoln County, Wyoming, United States

- Census-designated place
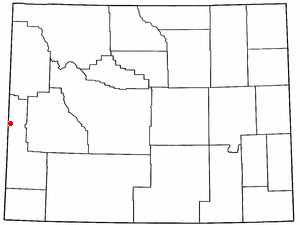
- Location of Auburn, Wyoming
- Coordinates: 42°47′46″N 111°00′09″W
- Country: United States
- State: Wyoming
- County: Lincoln

Area
  - Total: 2.2 sq mi (5.6 km^{2})
  - Land: 2.2 sq mi (5.6 km^{2})
  - Water: 0 sq mi (0.0 km^{2})
- Elevation: 6,053 ft (1,845 m)

Population (2020)
  - Total: 375
  - Density: 170/sq mi (67/km^{2})
- Time zone: UTC-7 (Mountain (MST))
  - Summer (DST): UTC-6 (MDT)
- ZIP code: 83111
- Area code: 307
- FIPS code: 56-04160
- GNIS feature ID: 2407780

Auburn is a census-designated place (CDP) in Lincoln County, Wyoming, United States. As of the 2020 census, the CDP population was 375.

The first settlement at Auburn was made in 1879.

== Geography ==
Auburn is located in the Star Valley, a grassland valley surrounded by forested mountains.

According to the United States Census Bureau, the CDP has a total area of 2.1 square miles (5.5 km^{2}), all land.

== Demographics ==
As of the census of 2000, there were 276 people, 85 households, and 74 families residing in the CDP. The population density was 128.8 people per square mile (49.8/km^{2}). There were 94 housing units at an average density of 43.9/sq mi (17.0/km^{2}). The racial makeup of the CDP was 98.19% White, 0.36% from other races, and 1.45% from two or more races. Hispanic or Latino of any race were 0.72% of the population.

There were 85 households, out of which 37.6% had children under the age of 18 living with them, 77.6% were married couples living together, 8.2% had a female householder with no husband present, and 11.8% were non-families. 9.4% of all households were made up of individuals, and 5.9% had someone living alone who was 65 years of age or older. The average household size was 3.25 and the average family size was 3.45.

In the CDP, the population was spread out, with 32.6% under the age of 18, 11.2% from 18 to 24, 23.2% from 25 to 44, 23.9% from 45 to 64, and 9.1% who were 65 years of age or older. The median age was 30 years. For every 100 females, there were 107.5 males. For every 100 females age 18 and over, there were 102.2 males.

The median income for a household in the CDP was $33,125, and the median income for a family was $35,083. Males had a median income of $29,583 versus $15,208 for females. The per capita income for the CDP was $9,932. About 17.3% of families and 22.3% of the population were below the poverty line, including 34.8% of those under the age of eighteen and none of those sixty-five or over.

== Education ==
Public education in the community of Auburn is provided by Lincoln County School District #2.

== See also ==
- List of census-designated places in Wyoming
