= Turnerville, Wyoming =

Census-designated place in Lincoln County, Wyoming, United States

- Census-designated place
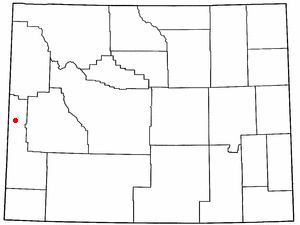
- Location of Turnerville, Wyoming
- Coordinates: 42°52′20″N 110°54′18″W
- Country: United States
- State: Wyoming
- County: Lincoln

Area
  - Total: 4.9 sq mi (13 km^{2})
  - Land: 4.9 sq mi (13 km^{2})
  - Water: 0.0 sq mi (0 km^{2})
- Elevation: 6,407 ft (1,953 m)

Population (2010)
  - Total: 192
  - Density: 39/sq mi (15/km^{2})
- Time zone: UTC-7 (Mountain (MST))
  - Summer (DST): UTC-6 (MDT)
- ZIP codes: 83110, 83112
- Area code: 307
- FIPS code: 56-78400
- GNIS feature ID: 2409365

Turnerville is a census-designated place (CDP) in Lincoln County, Wyoming, United States. The population was 192 at the 2010 census.

== Geography ==
According to the United States Census Bureau, the CDP has a total area of 4.9 square miles (12.7 km^{2}), all land.

== Demographics ==
As of the census of 2000, there were 155 people, 46 households, and 40 families residing in the CDP. The population density was 38.2 people per square mile (14.7/km^{2}). There were 57 housing units at an average density of 14.0/sq mi (5.4/km^{2}). The racial makeup of the CDP was 96.77% White, and 3.23% from two or more races. Hispanic or Latino of any race were 1.29% of the population.

There were 46 households, out of which 43.5% had children under the age of 18 living with them, 80.4% were married couples living together, 2.2% had a female householder with no husband present, and 13.0% were non-families. 10.9% of all households were made up of individuals, and none had someone living alone who was 65 years of age or older. The average household size was 3.37 and the average family size was 3.70.

In the CDP, the population was spread out, with 39.4% under the age of 18, 5.2% from 18 to 24, 23.2% from 25 to 44, 15.5% from 45 to 64, and 16.8% who were 65 years of age or older. The median age was 35 years. For every 100 females, there were 112.3 males. For every 100 females age 18 and over, there were 118.6 males.

The median income for a household in the CDP was $52,857, and the median income for a family was $54,107. Males had a median income of $49,107 versus $0 for females. The per capita income for the CDP was $29,456. None of the population or families were below the poverty line.

== Education ==
Public education in the community of Turnerville is provided by Lincoln County School District #2.

== See also ==
- List of census-designated places in Wyoming
