= Alpine, Wyoming =

Town in Wyoming, United States

- Town
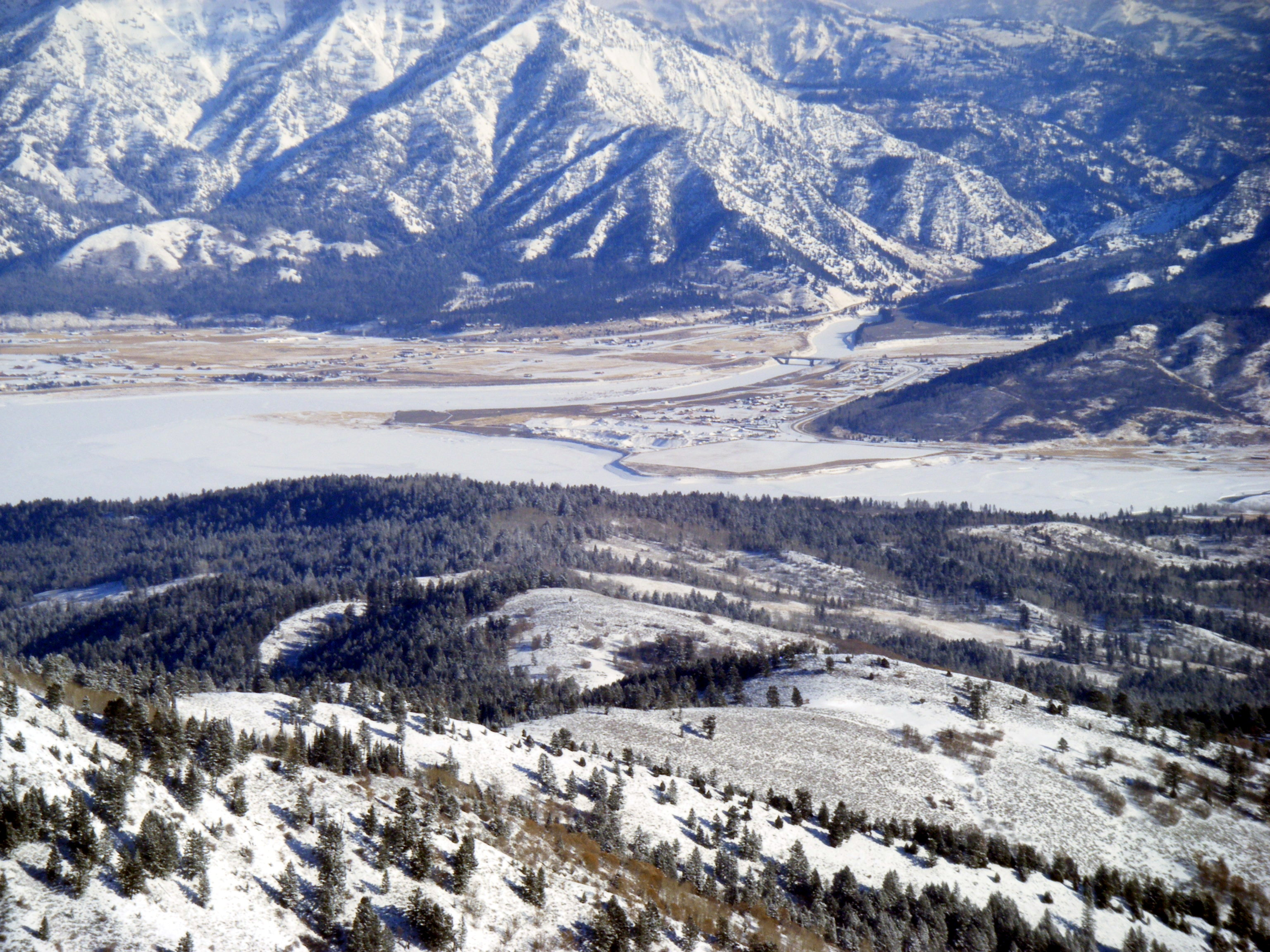
- Overview of Alpine

- Logo

- Location of Alpine in Lincoln County, Wyoming
- Coordinates: 43°09′44″N 111°01′13″W
- Country: United States
- State: Wyoming
- County: Lincoln

Area
  - Total: 1.00 sq mi (2.58 km^{2})
  - Land: 0.99 sq mi (2.57 km^{2})
  - Water: 0.0039 sq mi (0.01 km^{2})
- Elevation: 5,633 ft (1,717 m)

Population (2020)
  - Total: 1,220
  - Density: 930.6/sq mi (359.29/km^{2})
- Time zone: UTC–7 (Mountain (MST))
  - Summer (DST): UTC–6 (MDT)
- ZIP Code: 83128
- Area code: 307
- FIPS code: 56-01695
- GNIS feature ID: 2412353
- Website: www.alpinewy.gov

Alpine is a town in the northwest corner of Lincoln County, Wyoming, United States. The community lies adjacent to the Idaho border and the northwest end of the Alpine Airport's single runway extends into Idaho. The population was 1,220 at the 2020 census.

The community was incorporated in 1988.

== Geography ==
Alpine is located at the southern end of the Snake River Canyon where the Snake River enters Palisades Reservoir. The town is also known as Alpine Junction since it marks the point where U.S. routes 26 and 89 turn in opposite directions. The two routes run concurrently through the Snake River Canyon from Jackson. In Alpine, Route 89 turns south toward Afton, while Route 26 turns north and follows the edge of Palisades Reservoir to Swan Valley, Idaho. Three rivers come together in the vicinity of Alpine: the Snake, the Salt, and the Greys — the Greys merges with the Snake right at the high water mark of the reservoir, while the Salt discharges directly into the reservoir nearby unless the reservoir is exceptionally low.

According to the United States Census Bureau, the town has a total area of 0.70 square miles (1.81 km^{2}), all land.

=== Climate ===
This climatic region is typified by large seasonal temperature differences, with warm to hot (and often humid) summers and cold (sometimes severely cold) winters. According to the Köppen Climate Classification system, Alpine has a humid continental climate, abbreviated "Dfb" on climate maps.

== Demographics ==
Historical population
Census	Pop.	Note	%±
1990	200		—
2000	550		175.0%
2010	828		50.5%
2020	1,220		47.3%
U.S. Decennial Census

=== 2010 census ===
As of the census of 2010, there were 828 people, 346 households, and 221 families living in the town. The population density was 1,182.9 inhabitants per square mile (456.7/km^{2}). There were 449 housing units at an average density of 641.4 per square mile (247.6/km^{2}). The racial makeup of the town was 95.2% White, 0.4% African American, 0.2% Native American, 0.5% Asian, 2.4% from other races, and 1.3% from two or more races. Hispanic or Latino of any race were 5.6% of the population.

There were 346 households, of which 29.5% had children under the age of 18 living with them, 53.8% were married couples living together, 5.8% had a female householder with no husband present, 4.3% had a male householder with no wife present, and 36.1% were non-families. 20.2% of all households were made up of individuals, and 1.8% had someone living alone who was 65 years of age or older. The average household size was 2.39 and the average family size was 2.83.

The median age in the town was 36.6 years. 21% of residents were under the age of 18; 8.1% were between the ages of 18 and 24; 37.8% were from 25 to 44; 27.3% were from 45 to 64; and 5.8% were 65 years of age or older. The gender makeup of the town was 53.3% male and 46.7% female.

== Government ==
The town has a mayor and town council. There are four council members. The mayor in 2026 was Eric Green.

== Education ==
Public education in the town of Alpine is provided by Lincoln County School District #2.

Alpine has a public library, a branch of the Lincoln County Library System.
