= Fairview, Wyoming =

Census-designated place in Lincoln County, Wyoming

- Census-designated place
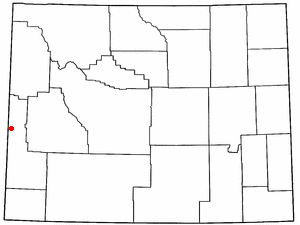
- Location of Fairview, Wyoming
- Coordinates: 42°41′07″N 110°59′45″W
- Country: United States
- State: Wyoming
- County: Lincoln

Area
  - Total: 2.8 sq mi (7.2 km^{2})
  - Land: 2.8 sq mi (7.2 km^{2})
  - Water: 0 sq mi (0.0 km^{2})
- Elevation: 6,207 ft (1,892 m)

Population (2020)
  - Total: 277
  - Density: 100/sq mi (38/km^{2})
- Time zone: UTC-7 (Mountain (MST))
  - Summer (DST): UTC-6 (MDT)
- ZIP code: 83119
- Area code: 307
- FIPS code: 56-25910
- GNIS feature ID: 2408105

Fairview Census-designated place (CDP) is in Lincoln County, Wyoming, United States. The population was 277 at the 2020 census.

== History ==
The first settlement at Fairview was made in 1885. A post office called Fairview has been in operation since 1889. The community was so named on account of scenic views from the elevated townsite.

== Geography ==
According to the United States Census Bureau, the CDP has a total area of 2.8 square miles (7.2 km^{2}), all land.

== Demographics ==
=== 2020 census ===
The 2020 United States census counted 277 people, 95 households, and 78 families in Fairview. The population density was 101.0 per square mile (39.0/km^{2}). There were 106 housing units at an average density of 38.7 per square mile (14.9/km^{2}). The racial makeup was 92.06% (255) white or European American (92.06% non-Hispanic white), 0.0% (0) black or African-American, 1.81% (5) Native American or Alaska Native, 0.0% (0) Asian, 1.08% (3) Pacific Islander or Native Hawaiian, 1.81% (5) from other races, and 3.25% (9) from two or more races. Hispanic or Latino people of any race were 2.53% (7) of the population.

Of the 95 households, 42.1% had children under the age of 18; 73.7% were married couples living together; 9.5% had a female householder with no spouse or partner present. 14.7% of households consisted of individuals and 12.6% had someone living alone who was 65 years of age or older. The average household size was 5.2 and the average family size was 5.2. The percent of those with a bachelor’s degree or higher was estimated to be 4.3% of the population.

30.3% of the population was under the age of 18, 12.6% from 18 to 24, 20.2% from 25 to 44, 19.9% from 45 to 64, and 17.0% who were 65 years of age or older. The median age was 32.4 years. For every 100 females, there were 97.9 males. For every 100 females ages 18 and older, there were 103.2 males.

The 2016–2020 5-year American Community Survey estimates show that Approximately, 0.0% of the population were below the poverty line.

=== 2000 census ===
As of the census of 2000, there were 277 people, 81 households, and 63 families residing in the CDP. The population density was 99.8 people per square mile (38.6/km^{2}). There were 91 housing units at an average density of 32.8/sq mi (12.7/km^{2}). The racial makeup of the CDP was 99.64% White and 0.36% Asian. Hispanic or Latino people of any race were 1.81% of the population.

There were 81 households, out of which 56.8% had children under the age of 18 living with them, 72.8% were married couples living together, 6.2% had a female householder with no husband present, and 21.0% were non-families. 11.1% of all households were made up of individuals, and 7.4% had someone living alone who was 65 years of age or older. The average household size was 3.42 and the average family size was 3.92.

In the CDP, the population was spread out, with 41.5% under the age of 18, 7.6% from 18 to 24, 27.8% from 25 to 44, 15.5% from 45 to 64, and 7.6% who were 65 years of age or older. The median age was 26 years. For every 100 females, there were 92.4 males. For every 100 females age 18 and over, there were 100.0 males.

The median income for a household in the CDP was $35,568, and the median income for a family was $36,477. Males had a median income of $34,750 versus $20,313 for females. The per capita income for the CDP was $8,322. About 14.0% of families and 14.1% of the population were below the poverty line, including 16.4% of those under the age of eighteen and none of those 65 or over.

== Education ==
Public education in the community of Fairview is provided by Lincoln County School District #2.

== See also ==
- List of census-designated places in Wyoming
