= Afton, Wyoming =

- Town
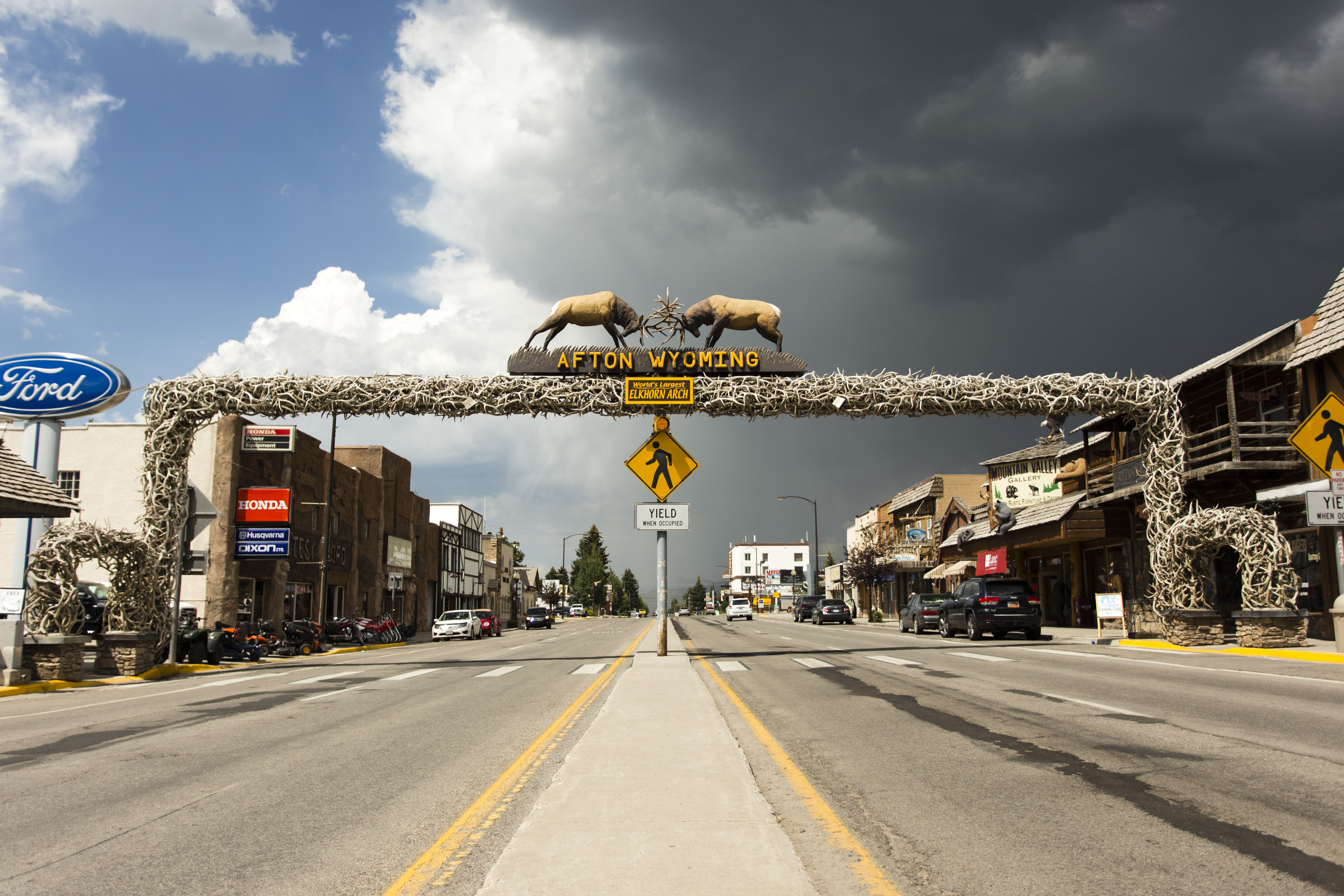
- Main Street Afton with antler arch

- Location of Afton in Lincoln County, Wyoming.
- Coordinates: 42°44′48″N 110°55′52″W
- Country: United States
- State: Wyoming
- County: Lincoln

Area
  - Total: 4.44 sq mi (11.51 km^{2})
  - Land: 4.44 sq mi (11.50 km^{2})
  - Water: 0.0077 sq mi (0.02 km^{2})
- Elevation: 6,240 ft (1,900 m)

Population (2020)
  - Total: 2,172
  - Density: 459.8/sq mi (177.53/km^{2})
- Time zone: UTC-7 (Mountain (MST))
  - Summer (DST): UTC-6 (MDT)
- ZIP code: 83110
- Area code: 307
- FIPS code: 56-00245
- GNIS feature ID: 2412337
- Website: aftonwyoming.gov

Afton is a town in Lincoln County, Wyoming, United States. The population was 2,172 at the 2020 census. Afton is home to the world's largest arch made of elk antlers. Spanning 75 feet (23 m) across the four lanes of U.S. Highway 89, the arch, completed in 1958, consists of 3,011 naturally shed elk antlers and weighs 15 tons.

Afton was incorporated in 1902.

== History ==
In 1879, people in the Latter Day Saint movement began creating homesteads and settlements in Star Valley, Wyoming. The town site was surveyed to have thirty blocks, each ten acres and priced at $1.00. The first settlement at Afton was made in 1885. The community takes its name from the River Afton, in Ayrshire, Scotland.

A sawmill was built in 1885, a general store in 1886, and a flour mill in 1886.

== Geography ==
According to the United States Census Bureau, the town has a total area of 4.18 square miles (10.83 km^{2}), all land.

A periodic spring is Afton's main water supply, which cycles on and off during the summer, fall, and winter at 12 to 18 minute intervals. During the spring the flow never stops due to increased water supply from the melting snowpack. At full flow the Intermittent Spring discharges up to 285 gallons per second. It is located five miles east of Afton, a short hike from the end of Swift Creek Road.

Swift Creek runs through town.

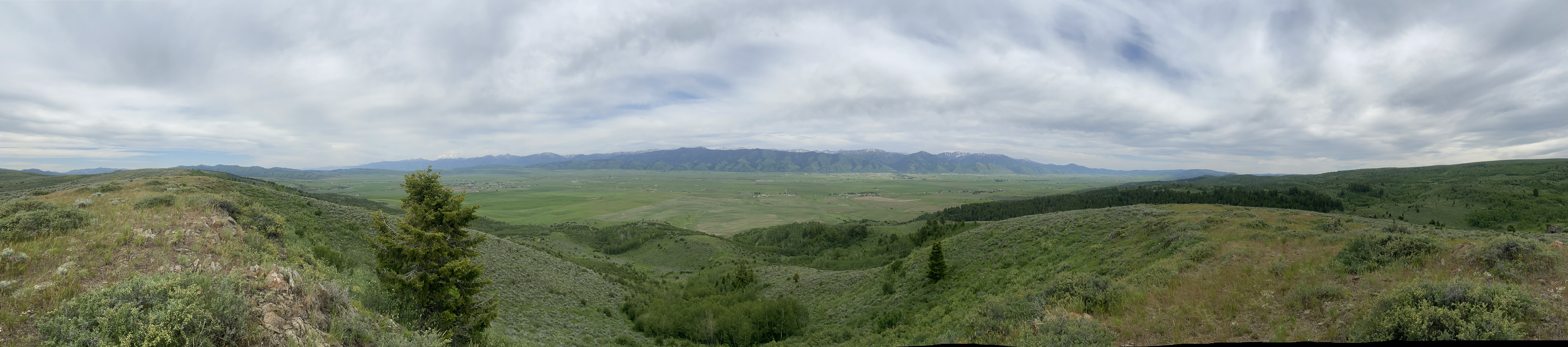
Star Valley looking east toward Afton, Wyoming

=== Climate ===
According to the Köppen Climate Classification system, Afton has a warm-summer humid continental, abbreviated "Dfb" on climate maps. The hottest temperature recorded in Afton was 97 °F (36 °C) on July 15, 2002, while the coldest temperature recorded was −46 °F (−43 °C) on January 1, 1979.

Climate data for Afton, Wyoming, 1991–2020 normals, extremes 1957–present
Month	Jan	Feb	Mar	Apr	May	Jun	Jul	Aug	Sep	Oct	Nov	Dec	Year
Record high °F (°C)	54 (12)	56 (13)	73 (23)	78 (26)	87 (31)	94 (34)	97 (36)	96 (36)	93 (34)	83 (28)	70 (21)	58 (14)	97 (36)
Mean maximum °F (°C)	43.0 (6.1)	46.4 (8.0)	55.5 (13.1)	69.3 (20.7)	77.7 (25.4)	85.3 (29.6)	90.4 (32.4)	89.8 (32.1)	84.6 (29.2)	74.1 (23.4)	58.2 (14.6)	45.7 (7.6)	89.0 (31.7)
Mean daily maximum °F (°C)	25.7 (−3.5)	30.5 (−0.8)	40.3 (4.6)	49.8 (9.9)	60.4 (15.8)	70.6 (21.4)	80.0 (26.7)	79.3 (26.3)	69.3 (20.7)	55.8 (13.2)	39.2 (4.0)	26.8 (−2.9)	52.3 (11.3)
Daily mean °F (°C)	15.3 (−9.3)	19.1 (−7.2)	28.4 (−2.0)	37.5 (3.1)	46.7 (8.2)	54.5 (12.5)	62.0 (16.7)	61.0 (16.1)	51.9 (11.1)	40.7 (4.8)	27.8 (−2.3)	16.8 (−8.4)	38.5 (3.6)
Mean daily minimum °F (°C)	4.8 (−15.1)	7.6 (−13.6)	16.5 (−8.6)	25.2 (−3.8)	33.1 (0.6)	38.4 (3.6)	44.1 (6.7)	42.6 (5.9)	34.4 (1.3)	25.5 (−3.6)	16.4 (−8.7)	6.7 (−14.1)	24.6 (−4.1)
Mean minimum °F (°C)	−17.3 (−27.4)	−12.1 (−24.5)	−1.4 (−18.6)	14.0 (−10.0)	22.8 (−5.1)	29.2 (−1.6)	36.0 (2.2)	32.9 (0.5)	23.9 (−4.5)	12.5 (−10.8)	−1.3 (−18.5)	−14.7 (−25.9)	−20.2 (−29.0)
Record low °F (°C)	−46 (−43)	−40 (−40)	−22 (−30)	−3 (−19)	9 (−13)	19 (−7)	26 (−3)	21 (−6)	11 (−12)	−7 (−22)	−22 (−30)	−38 (−39)	−46 (−43)
Average precipitation inches (mm)	1.25 (32)	1.31 (33)	1.47 (37)	1.46 (37)	2.36 (60)	1.82 (46)	1.05 (27)	1.11 (28)	1.52 (39)	1.63 (41)	1.34 (34)	1.41 (36)	17.73 (450)
Average snowfall inches (cm)	21.8 (55)	15.0 (38)	12.2 (31)	5.0 (13)	0.8 (2.0)	0.2 (0.51)	0.0 (0.0)	0.0 (0.0)	0.2 (0.51)	3.7 (9.4)	11.4 (29)	17.5 (44)	87.8 (222.42)
Average precipitation days (≥ 0.01 in)	11.8	10.7	9.3	9.7	11.0	8.2	6.5	5.7	7.1	8.5	9.5	12.5	110.5
Average snowy days (≥ 0.1 in)	9.9	9.3	6.6	3.4	0.7	0.2	0.0	0.0	0.4	1.9	6.6	11.1	50.1
Source 1: NOAA
Source 2: National Weather Service

== Demographics ==
Historical population
Census	Pop.	Note	%±
1910	570		—
1920	796		39.6%
1930	807		1.4%
1940	1,211		50.1%
1950	1,319		8.9%
1960	1,337		1.4%
1970	1,290		−3.5%
1980	1,481		14.8%
1990	1,394		−5.9%
2000	1,818		30.4%
2010	1,911		5.1%
2020	2,172		13.7%
2023 (est.)	2,270	▲	4.5%
U.S. Decennial Census

=== 2020 census ===
The 2020 United States census counted 2,172 people, 806 households, and 554 families in Afton. The population density was 489.3 per square mile (188.9/km^{2}). There were 899 housing units at an average density of 202.5 per square mile (78.2/km^{2}). The racial makeup was 90.29% (1,961) white or European American (88.26% non-Hispanic white), 0.41% (9) black or African-American, 1.24% (27) Native American or Alaska Native, 0.87% (19) Asian, 0.05% (1) Pacific Islander or Native Hawaiian, 2.49% (54) from other races, and 4.65% (101) from two or more races. Hispanic or Latino of any race was 5.48% (119) of the population.

Of the 806 households, 36.0% had children under the age of 18; 56.2% were married couples living together; 24.1% had a female householder with no spouse or partner present. 28.0% of households consisted of individuals and 11.9% had someone living alone who was 65 years of age or older. The average household size was 2.5 and the average family size was 3.4. The percent of those with a bachelor's degree or higher was estimated to be 14.4% of the population.

30.3% of the population was under the age of 18, 7.9% from 18 to 24, 23.7% from 25 to 44, 19.9% from 45 to 64, and 18.1% who were 65 years of age or older. The median age was 35.2 years. For every 100 females, there were 106.1 males. For every 100 females ages 18 and older, there were 111.0 males.

The 2016–2020 5-year American Community Survey estimates show that the median household income was $46,000 (with a margin of error of +/- $14,925) and the median family income was $75,759 (+/- $9,396). Males had a median income of $34,632 (+/- $14,409) versus $31,125 (+/- $16,138) for females. The median income for those above 16 years old was $33,625 (+/- $10,786). Approximately, 5.9% of families and 10.4% of the population were below the poverty line, including 18.7% of those under the age of 18 and 3.4% of those ages 65 or over.

=== 2010 census ===
At the 2010 census there were 1,911 people, 703 households, and 496 families living in the town. The population density was 457.2 inhabitants per square mile (176.5/km^{2}). There were 855 housing units at an average density of 204.5 per square mile (79.0/km^{2}). The racial makeup of the town was 94.1% White, 0.2% African American, 0.7% Native American, 0.2% Asian, 2.6% from other races, and 2.2% from two or more races. Hispanic or Latino of any race were 4.2%.

Of the 703 households 38.5% had children under the age of 18 living with them, 59.2% were married couples living together, 8.0% had a female householder with no husband present, 3.4% had a male householder with no wife present, and 29.4% were non-families. 26.2% of households were one person and 10.6% were one person aged 65 or older. The average household size was 2.68 and the average family size was 3.26.

The median age in the town was 33 years. 32% of residents were under the age of 18; 7.6% were between the ages of 18 and 24; 23.2% were from 25 to 44; 23% were from 45 to 64; and 14.3% were 65 or older. The gender makeup of the town was 49.7% male and 50.3% female.

== Government ==
Afton has a mayor and town council. There are three council members. In 2026 the mayor was Jeff Jensen.

== Arts and culture ==
The Lander Trail Museum has memorabilia related to a short cut for the Oregon Trail created by Frederick W. Lander. It is open during summer months.

Valli Vu Golf Course was designed by Johnny Miller, a frequent visitor to Star Valley.

Afton has a public library, a branch of the Lincoln County Public Library System.

== Education ==
Public education in the town of Afton is provided by Lincoln County School District #2. Zoned campuses include Afton Elementary School (grades K-3), Osmond Elementary School (grades 4–6), Thayne Elementary School (grades K-3), Etna Elementary School (grades 4–6), Star Valley Middle School (grades 7–8), and Star Valley High School (grades 9–12).

== Notable people ==
- Rulon Gardner (born 1971) – Olympic Greco-Roman wrestler
- Velma Linford (1907–2002) – educator, politician and writer
