= U.S. Route 89 =

Highway in the United States

U.S. Route 89
- US 89 highlighted in red; the gap represents the unofficial segment through Yellowstone National Park

Route information
- Length: 1,252 mi (2,015 km)
- Existed: 1926–present

Major junctions
- South end: BL 40 / US 180 in Flagstaff, AZ
- I-70 / US 50 in Salina, UT; US 6 near Spanish Fork, UT; I-15 in Lehi, UT; I-80 in Salt Lake City, UT; I-84 near Ogden, UT; US 91 in Logan, UT; US 30 in Montpelier, ID; I-90 in Livingston, MT; I-15 in Great Falls, MT; US 2 in Browning, MT
- North end: Highway 2 at the Canadian border near Babb, MT

Location
- Country: United States
- States: Arizona, Utah, Idaho, Wyoming, Montana

Highway system
- United States Numbered Highway System; List; Special; Divided
← US 87	→ US 90

U.S. Route 89 (US 89) is a north–south United States Numbered Highway with two sections, and one former section. The southern section runs for 848 miles (1,365 km) from Flagstaff, Arizona, to the southern entrance of Yellowstone National Park. The northern section runs for 404 miles (650 km) from the northern entrance of Yellowstone National Park in Montana, ending at the Canadian border. Unnumbered roads through Yellowstone connect the two sections. Before 1992, US 89 was a Canada–Mexico, border-to-border highway that ended at Nogales, Arizona, on its southern end.

Sometimes called the National Park Highway, US 89 links seven national parks across the Mountain West. In addition, 14 other national park areas, mostly national monuments, are also reachable from this backbone through the Colorado Plateau, Wasatch Mountains and northern Rockies.

National Geographic named US Route 89 the No. 1 Driver's Drive in the world.

== Route description ==
=== Arizona ===
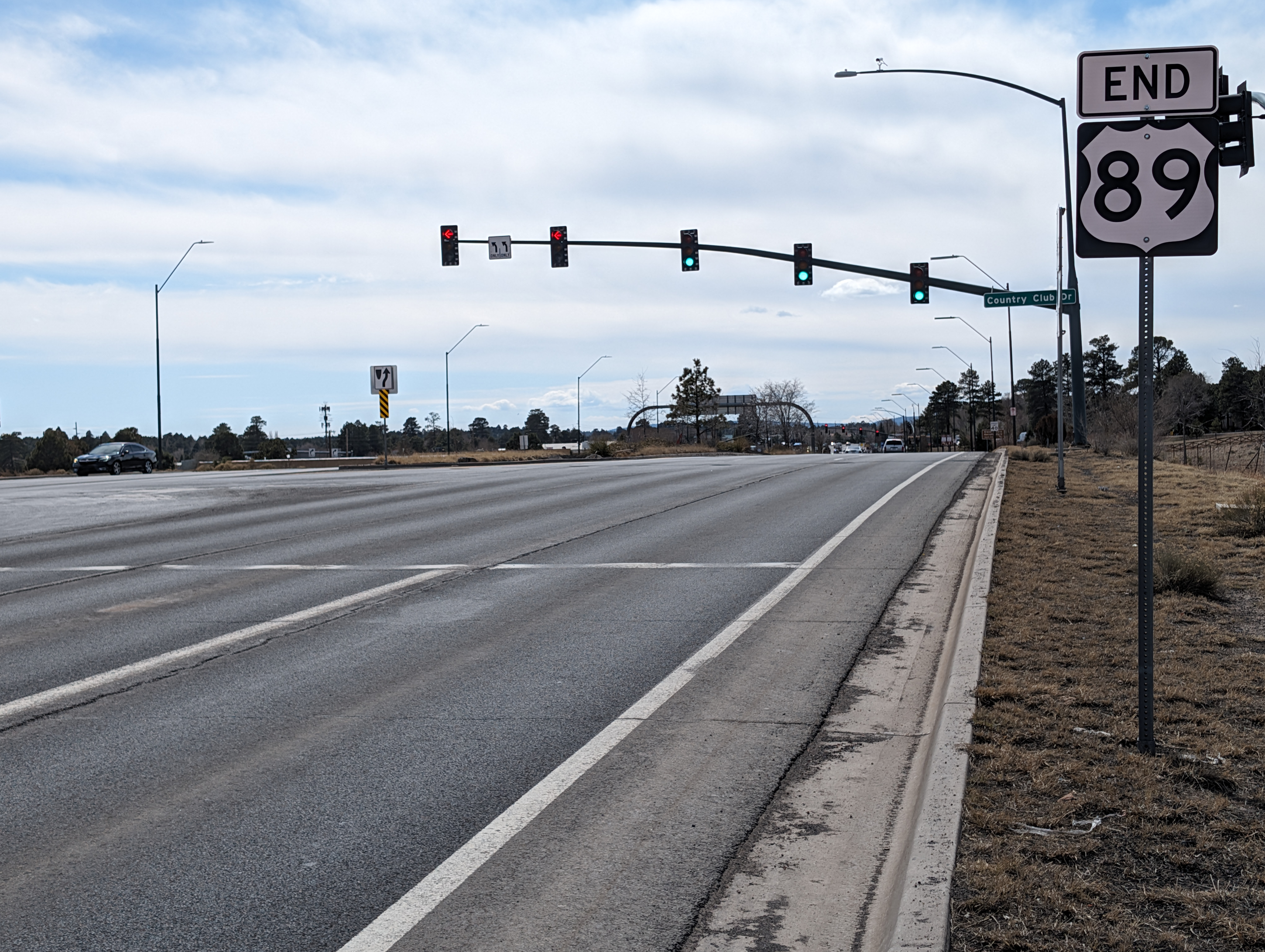
Southern terminus in Flagstaff, AZ

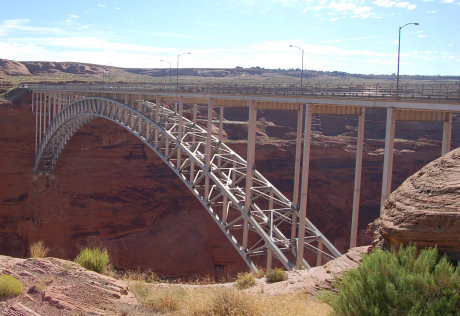
US 89 crossing Glen Canyon in Arizona

US 89 begins at Flagstaff, Arizona. The highway proceeds north passing near Grand Canyon National Park and through the Navajo Nation. Near the Utah state line, the highway splits into US 89 and US 89A. The alternate is the original highway; what is now the main highway was constructed in the 1960s to serve the Glen Canyon Dam and Page. The main branch passes over the Colorado River just south of the dam and Lake Powell and then enters Utah. The US 89A branch turns westward and crosses the Colorado River via the Navajo Bridge at Marble Canyon near Lees Ferry. It then climbs on to the Kaibab Plateau, connecting with Arizona State Route 67 at Jacob Lake which provides access to the North Rim of the Grand Canyon. Just before entering Utah, a junction with Arizona State Route 389 in Fredonia serves the Pipe Spring National Monument. The two highways rejoin in Kanab, Utah.

Historically, the route extended south to Nogales and served numerous sites of the National Park System in Arizona. Just north of the Mexican border is the Tumacacori National Monument (now Tumacacori National Historical Park), while further north Saguaro National Monument (now Saguaro National Park) in Tucson was reached. Short links took motorists to the Casa Grande National Monument and the Hohokam Pima National Monument south of Phoenix. In the vicinity of Flagstaff there is a quartet of parks: Tuzigoot National Monument, Walnut Canyon National Monument, Sunset Crater National Monument, and Wupatki National Monument. North of Flagstaff, US 89 offers access to both the South Rim and North Rim of Grand Canyon National Park.

=== Utah ===
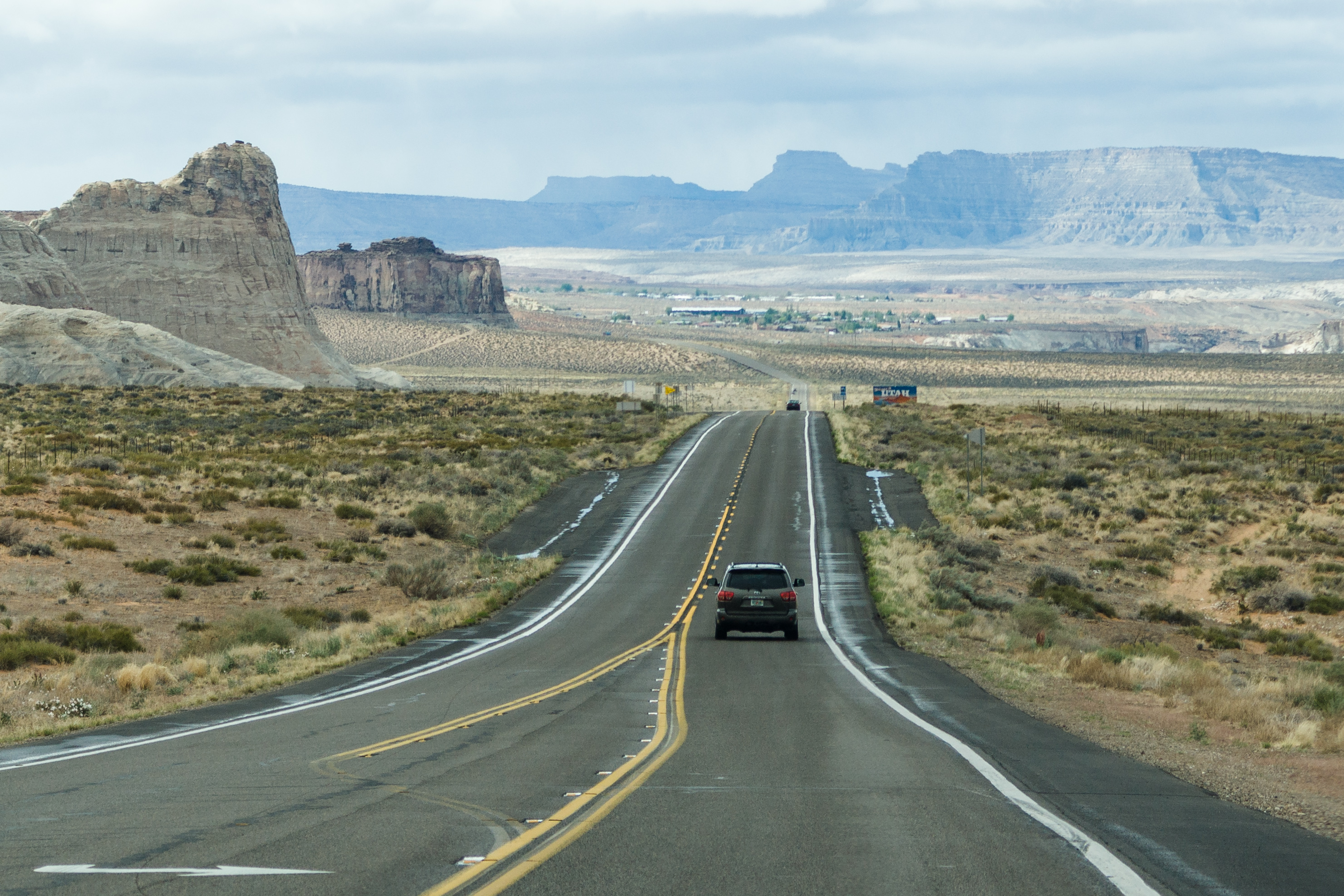
U.S. Route 89 at the border of Arizona and Utah

The first city in Utah along either US 89 or US 89A is Kanab where the two routes re-unite. From Kanab US 89 proceeds north passing by Zion National Park, Cedar Breaks National Monument, and Bryce Canyon National Park. It eventually enters Sevier County and the Sanpete Valleys. The highway then passes by Thistle, a ghost town that was destroyed by a lake resulting from a landslide in 1983. The highway then enters the Wasatch Front where US 89 becomes State Street, the main street for many cities in Utah and Salt Lake Counties. The highway is also often in the shadows of Interstate 15 (I-15) during its route along the Wasatch Front. US 89 runs concurrently with I-15 from Bountiful to Farmington, where it departs and runs at the base of the Wasatch Mountains until it reaches Ogden. In Ogden, the highway is Washington Boulevard. From Ogden the highway runs north until it meets US 91 at Brigham City, where it turns east to serve Cache Valley and Logan, concurrent with US 91. In Logan, US 89 forms the southern portion of Main Street before splitting off to the east, passing by the campus of the Utah State University. The highway next proceeds up Logan Canyon to Bear Lake where the highway exits Utah.

Two sections of US 89 in Utah have been designated Scenic Byways. The Kanab to Mt. Carmel and Long Valley Scenic Byway is a designated Utah Scenic Byway. The segment from Logan to Bear Lake is designated as the Logan Canyon Scenic Byway by the National Scenic Byways project.

The section of US 89 in Utah, other than concurrencies with I-70, I-15, US 6, and US 91, is defined in the Utah Code Annotated § 72-4-114(8).

Utah is dominated by the Colorado Plateau. Along US 89 are Zion National Park, Bryce Canyon National Park, and Cedar Breaks National Monument. Although not readily adjacent to US 89, Capitol Reef National Park is accessible from US 89. US 89 leaves northern Utah well north of Salt Lake City and Timpanogos Cave National Monument and the Golden Spike National Historic Site.

=== Idaho ===
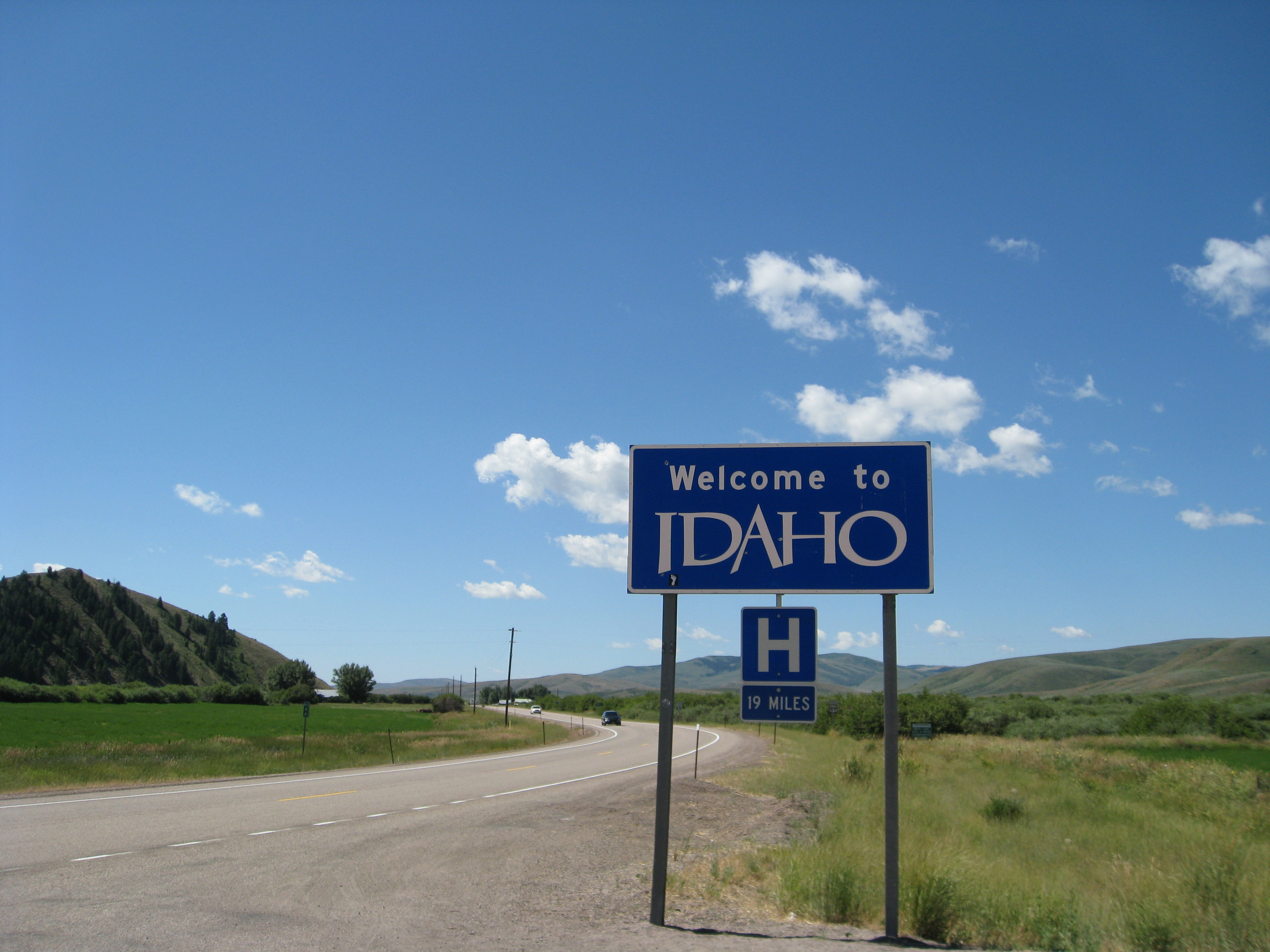
US 89 heading south along the Idaho/Wyoming state line

In Idaho, the highway partially circumnavigates Bear Lake, which straddles the Utah–Idaho state line.

=== Wyoming ===
In Wyoming, US 89 passes through many scenic sites including Grand Teton National Park, the Jackson Hole valley, the Snake River Canyon, and Star Valley.

Passing northward along the western border of Wyoming with Idaho, US 89 enters the Grand Teton National Park. Here, US 89 is the backbone visitor highway for two U.S. National Parks. Leaving the Tetons, the road enters a lesser known park, John D. Rockefeller, Jr. Memorial Parkway, before ending at the South Entrance of Yellowstone National Park. While US 89 and other U.S. Routes are officially discontinuous through the park, some commercially produced maps show these highways running inside Yellowstone National Park itself along its unnumbered roads and across the Wyoming–Montana state line.

=== Montana ===
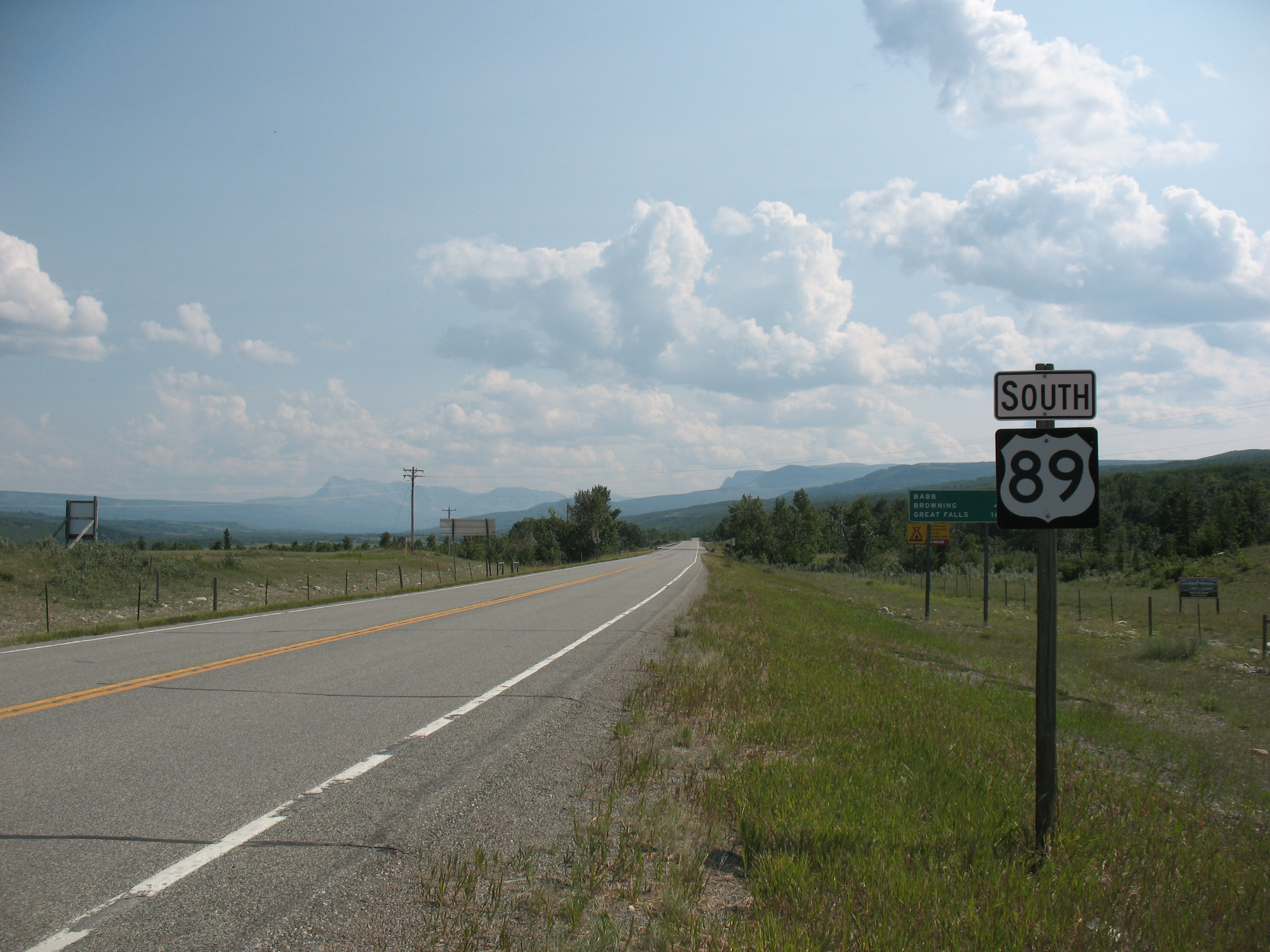
US 89 southbound at MT 17

US 89 enters Montana at the North Entrance of Yellowstone National Park. It traverses the width of the state before approaching Glacier National Park. At St. Mary, Montana, US 89 is the access highway to Glacier Route One, also known as the Going-to-the-Sun Road.

The Kings Hill Scenic Byway passes through the Little Belt Mountains in the Lewis and Clark National Forest in Montana. The route is home to a wide variety of wildlife and provides many recreational opportunities for travelers on the route. The byway is a 71-mile (114 km) route that begins on US 89 at its junction with US 12. From the junction of the byway it travels north through the Lewis and Clark National Forest through the communities of Neihart and Monarch and on to its junction with US 87. The route offers access to the Showdown Ski Area and Sluice Boxes State Park. The route travels over the Kings Hill Pass which snow removal crews work to keep open throughout the winter season.

The northern terminus of US 89 is at the Canadian border. There, the highway continues north to Calgary, Alberta as Alberta Highway 2.

== History ==
When US 89 was first created, it ran as far north as Spanish Fork, Utah. This was the case until 1934, when it was extended to more or less of its current alignment up to the Piegan Port of Entry north of Babb, Montana.

North of Great Falls, Montana, US 89's current route was originally numbered as US 87 until 1934. After US 89 took over that route, US 87 ended in Great Falls until 1945, when it was extended to its current northern terminus near Havre, Montana.

Prior to 1992, the southern terminus of US 89 was at Nogales, Arizona, and the highway proceeded to Flagstaff, Arizona, along what is now I-19, State Route 79, US 60, US 93, and State Route 89 between Prescott and Flagstaff via Williams. In addition, there was another US 89A in Arizona between Prescott and Flagstaff via Sedona on which is now State Route 89A.

In central Arizona, the need for a north–south U.S. Highway was largely superseded by the completion of I-17, which now carries the bulk of the traffic and all of the heavy trucks along this north–south corridor. I-17 connects I-40 in Flagstaff with I-10 in Phoenix, Arizona, along a very hilly route that also passes through the Verde Valley.

US 89 in central Utah was discontinuous for most of 1983 due to a landslide that destroyed the town of Thistle and closed the highway for about eight months.

From early 2013 to mid 2015, US 89 was closed approximately 25 miles (40 km) south of Page, due to a geological event that caused the roadway to buckle and subside. Traffic was being re-routed via 45 miles (72 km) of secondary and tertiary roads on the Navajo Nation. US 89T opened on August 29, 2013, a 28-mile (45 km) paved portion of a Navajo route to serve as a long-term bypass of the closed section.

== Major intersections ==
Southern segment

Arizona
US 180 in Flagstaff
US 160 west-southwest of Tuba City
Utah
I-70 north-northeast of Sevier. The highways travel concurrently to Salina.
I-70 / US 50 in Salina. US 50/US 89 travels concurrently through Salina.
US 6 east-northeast of Thistle. The highways travel concurrently to Spanish Fork.
US 189 in Provo
I-15 in Lehi. The highways travel concurrently to Draper.
I-215 in Murray
I-80 in South Salt Lake
I-15 in Salt Lake City
I-15 in North Salt Lake
I-15 on the West Bountiful–Bountiful city line. The highways travel concurrently to Farmington.
I-84 south-southeast of Uintah
US 91 in Brigham City. The highways travel concurrently to Logan.
Idaho
US 30 in Montpelier. The highways travel concurrently through Montpelier.
Wyoming
US 26 on the Alpine Northwest–Alpine Northeast line. The highways travel concurrently to Moran.
US 189 / US 191 in Hoback Junction. US 89/US 189 travels concurrently to Jackson. US 89/US 191 travels concurrently to the southern entrance to Yellowstone National Park north-northwest of Colter Bay Village.
US 26 / US 287 in Moran. US 89/US 287 travels concurrently to the southern entrance to Yellowstone National Park north-northwest of Colter Bay Village.

Yellowstone National Park segment (unofficial designation)

US 191 / US 287 travels concurrently from the park's southern entrance to north-northwest of West Thumb.
US 20 in West Thumb. The highways travel concurrently to north-northwest of West Thumb.
US 14 / US 16 in West Thumb.

Northern segment

Montana
The northern entrance to Yellowstone National Park south of Gardiner
I-90 / US 191 in Livingston. The highways travel concurrently to northeast of Livingston.
US 12 south of White Sulphur Springs. The highways travel concurrently to northeast of White Sulphur Springs.
US 87 south-southeast of Armington. The highways travel concurrently to Great Falls.
I-315 in Great Falls. The highways travel concurrently through Great Falls.
I-15 / I-315 in Great Falls. I-15/US 89 travels concurrently to northeast of Vaughn.
US 287 in Choteau
US 2 southeast of South Browning. The highways travel concurrently to South Browning.
Highway 2 at the Canada–United States border north-northeast of Babb

== See also ==
- U.S. Route 89A
- U.S. Route 189
