= Etna, Wyoming =

- Census-designated place
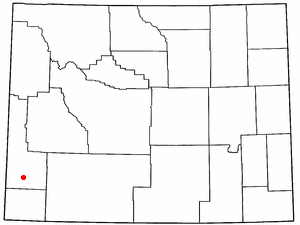
- Location of Etna, Wyoming
- Coordinates: 43°01′42″N 111°00′25″W
- Country: United States
- State: Wyoming
- County: Lincoln

Area
  - Total: 2.0 sq mi (5.1 km^{2})
  - Land: 2.0 sq mi (5.1 km^{2})
  - Water: 0 sq mi (0.0 km^{2})
- Elevation: 5,827 ft (1,776 m)

Population (2020)
  - Total: 185
  - Density: 94/sq mi (36/km^{2})
- Time zone: UTC-7 (Mountain (MST))
  - Summer (DST): UTC-6 (MDT)
- ZIP code: 83118
- Area code: 307
- FIPS code: 56-25475
- GNIS feature ID: 2408093

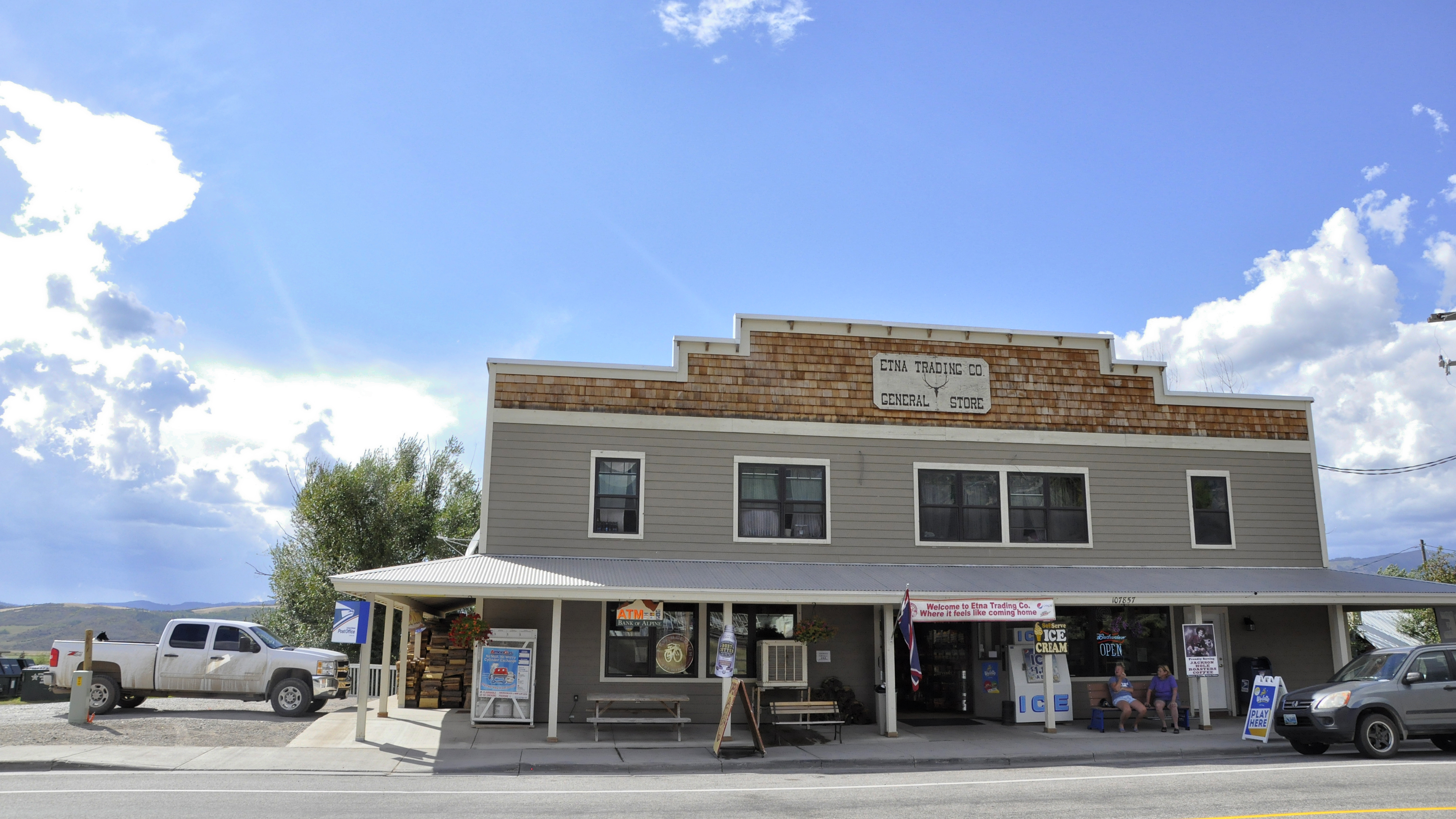
Etna, Wyoming

Etna is a census-designated place (CDP) in Lincoln County, Wyoming, United States. The population was 185 at the 2020 census.

== Geography ==
Etna is located in Star Valley, a grassland valley surrounded by forested mountains.

According to the United States Census Bureau, the CDP has a total area of 2.0 square miles (5.1 km^{2}), all land.

== Demographics ==
As of the census of the year 2000, there were 123 people, 44 households, and 34 families residing in the CDP. The population density was 62.8 people per square mile (24.2/km^{2}). There were 55 housing units at an average density of 28.1/sq mi (10.8/km^{2}). The racial makeup of the CDP was 93.50% White, 1.63% African American, 1.63% from other races, and 3.25% from two or more races. Hispanic or Latino of any race were 4.88% of the population.

There were 44 households, out of which 45.5% had children under the age of 18 living with them, 65.9% were married couples living together, 9.1% had a female householder with no husband present, and 20.5% were non-families. 15.9% of all households were made up of individuals, and 13.6% had someone living alone who was 65 years of age or older. The average household size was 2.80 and the average family size was 3.17.

In the CDP, the population was spread out, with 34.1% under the age of 18, 4.1% from 18 to 24, 29.3% from 25 to 44, 19.5% from 45 to 64, and 13.0% who were 65 years of age or older. The median age was 34 years. For every 100 females, there were 89.2 males. For every 100 females age 18 and over, there were 84.1 males.

The median income for a household in the CDP was $42,917, and the median income for a family was $44,375. Males had a median income of $41,667 versus $0 for females. The per capita income for the CDP was $17,423. There were 19.4% of families and 24.5% of the population living below the poverty line, including 17.1% of under eighteens and 48.1% of those over 64.

== Education ==
Public education in the community of Etna is provided by Lincoln County School District #2.
