= Lincoln County, Wyoming =

County in Wyoming, United States

- County
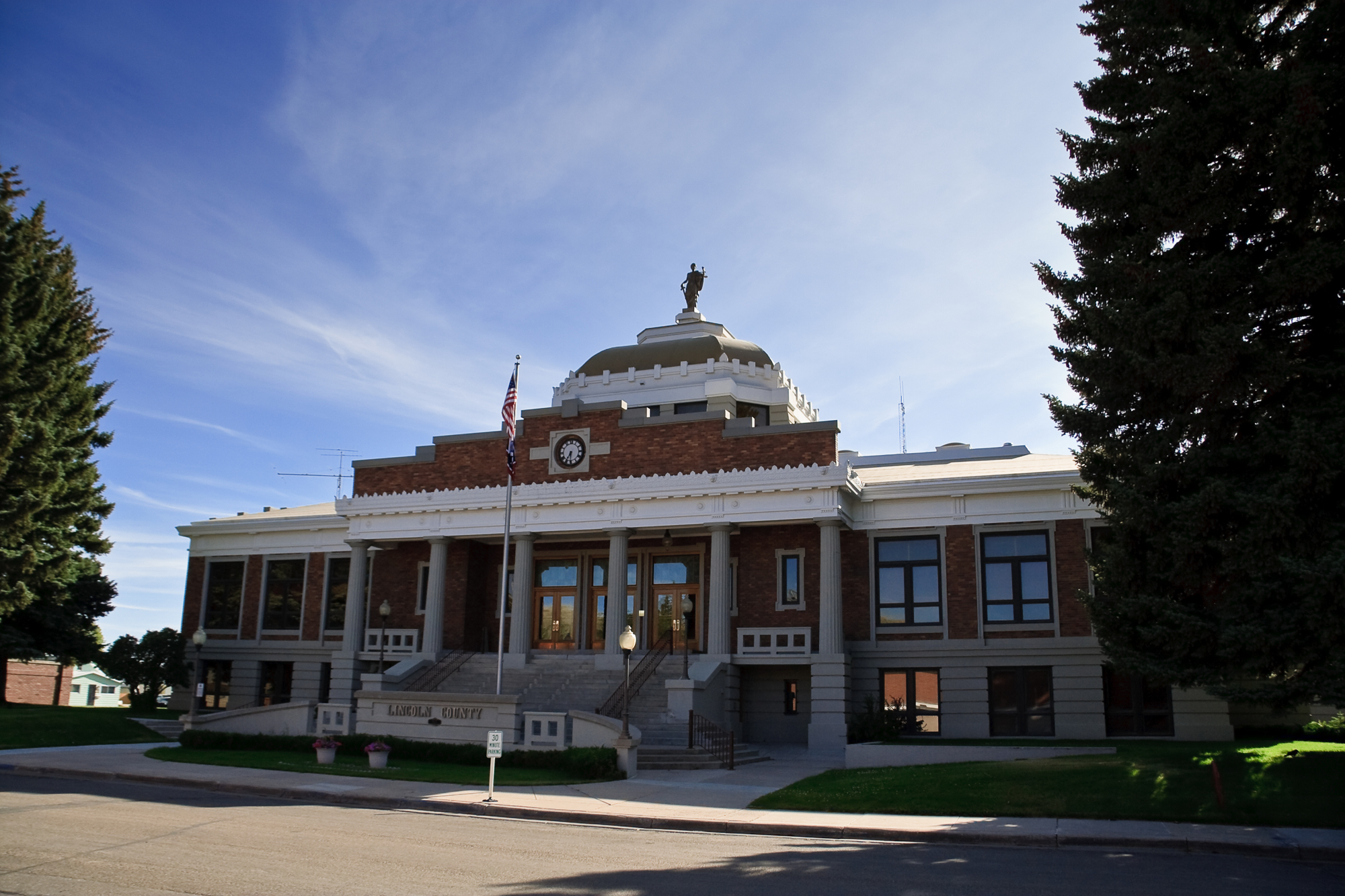
- Lincoln County Courthouse (Kemmerer)

- Location within the U.S. state of Wyoming
- Coordinates: 42.26°N 110.70°W
- Country: United States
- State: Wyoming
- Founded: February 21, 1911 (authorized); 1913 (organized)
- Named for: Abraham Lincoln
- Seat: Kemmerer
- Largest city: Kemmerer

Area
  - Total: 4,095 sq mi (10,610 km^{2})
  - Land: 4,076 sq mi (10,560 km^{2})
  - Water: 19 sq mi (49 km^{2}) 0.5%

Population (2020)
  - Total: 19,581
  - Estimate (2025): 21,180 ▲
  - Density: 4.804/sq mi (1.855/km^{2})
- Time zone: UTC−7 (Mountain)
  - Summer (DST): UTC−6 (MDT)
- Congressional district: At-large
- Website: www.lincolncountywy.gov

Lincoln County is a county in the U.S. state of Wyoming. As of the 2020 United States census, the population was 19,581. Its county seat is Kemmerer. Its western border abuts the eastern borders of the states of Idaho and Utah.

== History ==
Lincoln County was created February 21, 1911, with land detached from Uinta County. Its government was organized in 1913.

The county was named for Abraham Lincoln, sixteenth president of the United States.

In 1921, portions of Lincoln County were annexed to create Sublette County and Teton County, leaving Lincoln County with its present borders.

== Geography ==
According to the US Census Bureau, the county has a total area of 4,095 square miles (10,610 km^{2}), of which 4,076 square miles (10,560 km^{2}) is land and 19 square miles (49 km^{2}) (0.5%) is water.

=== Adjacent counties ===
- Teton County – north
- Sublette County – northeast
- Sweetwater County – east
- Uinta County – south
- Rich County, Utah – southwest
- Bear Lake County, Idaho – west
- Caribou County, Idaho – northwest
- Bonneville County, Idaho – northwest

=== National protected areas ===
- Bridger-Teton National Forest (part)
- Caribou-Targhee National Forest (part)
- Cokeville Meadows National Wildlife Refuge
- Fossil Butte National Monument

== Demographics ==
Historical population
Census	Pop.	Note	%±
1920	12,487		—
1930	10,894		−12.8%
1940	10,296		−5.5%
1950	9,023		−12.4%
1960	9,018		−0.1%
1970	8,640		−4.2%
1980	12,177		40.9%
1990	12,625		3.7%
2000	14,573		15.4%
2010	18,106		24.2%
2020	19,581		8.1%
2025 (est.)	21,180	▲	8.2%
US Decennial Census; 1870–2000 2010–2016

=== 2020 census ===
As of the 2020 census, there were 19,581 people, 7,545 households, and 5,386 families in Lincoln County, Wyoming. The population density was 4.8 per square mile (1.9/km^{2}), and the housing unit density was 2.3 per square mile (0.9/km^{2}).

Lincoln County, Wyoming – Rracial and ethnic composition Note: the US Census treats Hispanic/Latino as an ethnic category. This table excludes Latinos from the racial categories and assigns them to a separate category. Hispanics/Latinos may be of any race.
Race / ethnicity (NH = Non-Hispanic)	Pop 2000	Pop 2010	Pop 2020	% 2000	% 2010	% 2020
White alone (NH)	14,002	16,930	17,737	96.08%	93.50%	90.58%
Black or African American alone (NH)	14	32	34	0.10%	0.18%	0.17%
Native American or Alaska Native alone (NH)	67	126	101	0.46%	0.70%	0.52%
Asian alone (NH)	32	55	96	0.22%	0.30%	0.49%
Pacific Islander alone (NH)	7	4	21	0.05%	0.02%	0.11%
Other race alone (NH)	2	11	91	0.01%	0.06%	0.46%
Mixed-race or Mmultiracial (NH)	134	167	542	0.92%	0.92%	2.77%
Hispanic or Latino (any race)	315	781	959	2.16%	4.31%	4.90%
Total	14,573	18,106	19,581	100.00%	100.00%	100.00%

The racial makeup of the county was 91.8% white or European American (90.58% non-Hispanic white), 0.2% black or African-American, 0.6% Native American or Alaska Native, 0.5% Asian, 0.1% Pacific Islander or Native Hawaiian, 2.2% from other races, and 4.6% from two or more races. Hispanic or Latino people of any race were 4.9% of the population.

Of the residents, 26.2% were under the age of 18 and 19.1% were 65 years of age or older; the median age was 41.1 years. Additionally, 6.1% were from 18 to 24, 22.9% from 25 to 44, and 25.8% from 45 to 64. For every 100 females there were 103.2 males, and for every 100 females age 18 and over there were 103.3 males.

There were 7,545 households in the county, of which 30.6% had children under the age of 18 living with them, 60.6% were married couples living together, and 16.9% had a female householder with no spouse or partner present. About 24.1% of all households were made up of individuals and 10.6% had someone living alone who was 65 years of age or older. The average household size was 2.7 and the average family size was 3.3. The percent of those with a bachelor's degree or higher was estimated to be 15.5% of the population.

There were 9,489 housing units, of which 20.5% were vacant. Among occupied housing units, 79.4% were owner-occupied and 20.6% were renter-occupied. The homeowner vacancy rate was 1.7% and the rental vacancy rate was 11.5%.

The 2016–2020 5-year American Community Survey estimates show that the median household income was $71,898 (with a margin of error of +/- $4,107). The median family income was $89,792 (+/- $8,048). Males had a median income of $49,994 (+/- $2,287) versus $25,055 (+/- $1,647) for females. The median income for those above 16 years old was $34,877 (+/- $3,801). Approximately 3.4% of families and 7.2% of the population were below the poverty line, including 7.4% of those under the age of 18 and 8.4% of those ages 65 or over.

=== 2014 American Community Survey ===
According to the 2014 American Community Survey, the largest ancestries/ethnicities in Lincoln County, Wyoming were:

- 27.3% were of English ancestry.
- 17.9% were of German ancestry.
- 10.6% were of American ancestry.
- 7.5% were of Irish ancestry.
- 4.2% were of Italian ancestry.

=== 2010 census ===
As of the 2010 United States census, there were 18,106 people, 6,861 households, and 4,957 families in the county. The population density was 4.4 people per square mile (1.7 people/km^{2}). There were 8,946 housing units at an average density of 2.2 units per square mile (0.85 units/km^{2}). The racial makeup of the county was 95.4% white, 0.8% American Indian, 0.3% Asian, 0.2% black or African American, 2.0% from other races, and 1.2% from two or more races. Those of Hispanic or Latino origin made up 4.3% of the population. In terms of ancestry, 25.7% were English, 20.1% were American, 19.2% were German, 7.5% were Irish, and 5.0% were Italian.

Of the 6,861 households, 34.4% had children under the age of 18 living with them, 63.2% were married couples living together, 5.3% had a female householder with no husband present, 27.8% were non-families, and 22.8% of all households were made up of individuals. The average household size was 2.63 and the average family size was 3.11. The median age was 37.4 years.

The median income for a household in the county was $57,794 and the median income for a family was $65,347. Males had a median income of $49,087 versus $30,539 for females. The per capita income for the county was $24,421. About 4.6% of families and 8.1% of the population were below the poverty line, including 14.2% of those under age 18 and 6.2% of those age 65 or over.

=== 2000 census ===
As of the 2000 United States census, there were 14,573 people, 5,266 households, and 3,949 families in the county. The population density was 4 people per square mile (1.5 people/km^{2}). There were 6,831 housing units at an average density of 2 units per square mile (0.77 units/km^{2}). The racial makeup of the county was 97.15% White, 0.10% Black or African American, 0.57% Native American, 0.23% Asian, 0.05% Pacific Islander, 0.71% from other races, and 1.19% from two or more races. 2.16% of the population were Hispanic or Latino of any race. 29.0% were of English, 14.6% German, 9.5% American and 6.1% Irish ancestry.

There were 5,266 households, out of which 36.5% had children under the age of 18 living with them, 66.7% were married couples living together, 5.1% had a female householder with no husband present, and 25.0% were non-families. 21.0% of all households were made up of individuals, and 7.9% had someone living alone who was 65 years of age or older. The average household size was 2.75 and the average family size was 3.23.

The county population contained 30.9% under the age of 18, 7.2% from 18 to 24, 25.4% from 25 to 44, 24.2% from 45 to 64, and 12.4% who were 65 years of age or older. The median age was 37 years. For every 100 females there were 102.0 males. For every 100 females age 18 and over, there were 101.3 males.

The median income for a household in the county was $40,794, and the median income for a family was $44,919. Males had a median income of $37,353 versus $20,928 for females. The per capita income for the county was $17,533. About 6.4% of families and 9.0% of the population were below the poverty line, including 11.6% of those under age 18 and 6.4% of those age 65 or over.

== Education ==
There are three school districts that cover portions of the county:

- Lincoln County School District Number 1, which includes Kemmerer High School
- Lincoln County School District Number 2, which includes Star Valley High School.
- Sublette County School District 9

== Politics ==
Lincoln County voters are reliably Republican. In only one national election since 1948 has the county selected the Democratic Party nominee.

United States presidential election results for Lincoln County, Wyoming
Year	Republican		Democratic		Third party(ies)	
Year	No.	%	No.	%	No.	%
1912	1,430	42.33%	1,028	30.43%	920	27.24%
1916	1,426	36.05%	2,378	60.11%	152	3.84%
1920	2,043	61.06%	1,154	34.49%	149	4.45%
1924	1,493	48.25%	576	18.62%	1,025	33.13%
1928	2,217	56.57%	1,687	43.05%	15	0.38%
1932	1,673	41.76%	2,275	56.79%	58	1.45%
1936	1,376	33.08%	2,747	66.03%	37	0.89%
1940	1,765	38.33%	2,839	61.65%	1	0.02%
1944	1,649	43.52%	2,140	56.48%	0	0.00%
1948	1,730	46.28%	1,925	51.50%	83	2.22%
1952	2,321	57.59%	1,709	42.41%	0	0.00%
1956	2,264	59.16%	1,563	40.84%	0	0.00%
1960	2,010	50.78%	1,948	49.22%	0	0.00%
1964	1,811	44.34%	2,273	55.66%	0	0.00%
1968	2,030	57.01%	1,246	34.99%	285	8.00%
1972	2,459	67.08%	969	26.43%	238	6.49%
1976	2,464	60.93%	1,555	38.45%	25	0.62%
1980	3,412	72.69%	1,063	22.65%	219	4.67%
1984	3,854	78.32%	1,021	20.75%	46	0.93%
1988	3,237	66.10%	1,592	32.51%	68	1.39%
1992	2,595	45.08%	1,430	24.84%	1,732	30.09%
1996	3,764	57.59%	1,803	27.59%	969	14.83%
2000	5,415	79.11%	1,184	17.30%	246	3.59%
2004	6,423	81.16%	1,364	17.24%	127	1.60%
2008	6,485	75.69%	1,823	21.28%	260	3.03%
2012	7,144	82.90%	1,287	14.93%	187	2.17%
2016	6,779	76.38%	1,105	12.45%	991	11.17%
2020	8,643	82.57%	1,509	14.42%	316	3.02%
2024	8,957	82.63%	1,623	14.97%	260	2.40%

== Communities ==
=== City ===
- Kemmerer (county seat)

=== Towns ===
- Afton
- Alpine
- Cokeville
- Diamondville
- La Barge
- Opal
- Star Valley Ranch
- Thayne

=== Census-designated places ===
- Alpine Northeast
- Alpine Northwest
- Auburn
- Bedford
- Etna
- Fairview
- Fontenelle
- Freedom
- Grover
- Nordic
- Oakley
- Osmond
- Smoot
- Taylor
- Turnerville

=== Unincorporated communities ===
- Alpine Junction
- Border Junction
- Frontier
- Hamsfork
- Sage

== See also ==
- National Register of Historic Places listings in Lincoln County, Wyoming
- Wyoming
  - List of cities and towns in Wyoming
  - List of counties in Wyoming
  - Wyoming statistical areas
