= Area code 307 =

Area code for the US state of Wyoming

Coordinates: 43°00′N 107°30′W

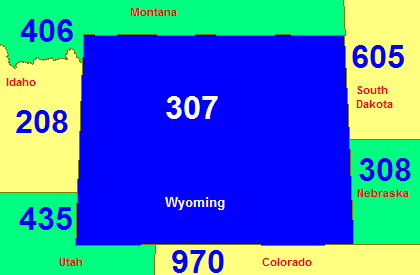
Wyoming's numbering plan area and area code (blue)

Area code 307 is the telephone area code in the North American Numbering Plan for the entire U.S. state of Wyoming. It is one of the 86 original North American area codes created by the American Telephone and Telegraph Company (AT&T) in 1947.

Wyoming's sparse population has not required more than one area code for the state. As of May 2025, it was one of only eleven states with only one area code. 307 is not expected to be exhausted until 2050 by current projections.

== Service area ==
The numbering plan area includes the following communities, with their respective central office codes:

- Afton: 226, 248, 884, 885, 886, 887
- Albin: 246
- Alpine: 654, 656
- Baggs: 380, 383
- Basin: 440, 568
- Big Piney: 260, 276
- Buffalo: 217, 278, 425, 620, 621, 684, 719
- Burlington: 762
- Burns: 547
- Casper: 215, 224, 230, 232, 233, 234, 235, 236, 237, 243, 247, 251, 253, 258, 259, 261, 262, 265, 266, 267, 268, 277, 315, 333, 337, 377, 439, 441, 462, 472, 473, 577, 702, 724, 776, 797, 995
- Cheyenne: 214, 220, 221, 222, 256, 274, 275, 286, 287, 316, 317, 365, 369, 414, 421, 426, 432, 433, 443, 459, 475, 477, 509, 514, 529, 630, 631, 632, 633, 634, 635, 637, 638, 640, 650, 666, 701, 757, 771, 772, 773, 775, 777, 778, 823, 829, 920, 996
- Chugwater: 422
- Clearmont: 758
- Cody: 204, 213, 250, 272, 296, 527, 578, 586, 587, 712, 899
- Cokeville: 229, 270, 279, 600
- Douglas: 298, 351, 358, 359, 624, 717
- Dubois: 239, 450, 455
- East Thermopolis: 480, 722, 864, 921
- Encampment: 327
- Evanston: 255, 288, 313, 444, 497, 677, 679, 708, 783, 789, 799
- Frannie: 664
- Gas Hills: 457
- Gillette: 228, 257, 299, 363, 487, 567, 622, 660, 670, 680, 681, 682, 685, 686, 687, 688, 689, 696, 704
- Glendo: 735
- Glenrock: 309, 436, 554, 741
- Green River: 297, 364, 466, 707, 870, 871, 872, 875
- Greybull: 373, 765
- Guernsey: 836
- Hanna: 325, 339, 348
- Hulett: 467
- Jackson: 200, 201, 203, 249, 264, 413, 690, 699, 713, 730, 732, 733, 734, 739, 740, 774
- Kaycee: 738
- Kemmerer: 723, 727, 800, 828, 877
- La Barge: 386, 390
- La Grange: 409, 834
- Lander: 206, 330, 332, 335, 345, 349, 438, 488, 714
- Laramie: 223, 314, 343, 399, 460, 703, 721, 742, 745, 755, 760, 761, 766, 977
- Lingle: 205, 837
- Lovell: 548, 731
- Lusk: 216, 334, 340, 481, 759
- Lyman: 787
- Manila: 874
- Medicine Bow: 379, 404, 520
- Meeteetse,: 868
- Midwest: 437
- Moran: 541, 543, 999
- Moorcroft: 391, 756
- Mountain View: 747, 780, 782
- Newcastle: 465, 629, 744, 746, 941, 949
- Pine Bluffs: 245
- Pinedale: 231, 360, 367, 537, 749
- Powell: 202, 219, 254, 271, 716, 754, 764
- Rawlins: 320, 321, 324, 328, 370, 417, 710
- Riverton: 240, 463, 709, 840, 850, 851, 854, 855, 856, 857, 858
- Rock River: 378, 798
- Rock Springs: 209, 212, 252, 350, 352, 354, 362, 371, 382, 389, 448, 522, 705, 922
- Saratoga: 326, 329, 447
- Sheridan: 429, 461, 533, 655, 672, 673, 674, 675, 683, 706, 751, 752, 763
- Shoshoni: 728, 876
- Sundance: 281, 282, 283, 290, 790
- Ten Sleep: 366
- Thermopolis: 480, 722, 864, 921
- Torrington: 338, 401, 532, 534, 575, 715
- Upton: 468
- West Edgemont: 663
- West Lyman: 788
- Wheatland: 241, 269, 322, 331, 720, 779, 881
- Worland: 347, 375, 388, 431, 718
- Wright: 464, 939
- Premium calls (unassigned): 208, 211, 307, 308, 311, 406, 411, 470, 511, 536, 555, 558, 559, 605, 611, 700, 711, 725, 811, 911, 950, 958, 959, 970, 976

== See also ==
- List of North American Numbering Plan area codes

Wyoming area codes: 307
	North: 406	
West: 208/986, 406, 435	307	East: 605, 308
	South: 435, 970	
Colorado area codes: 303/720/983, 719, 748/970
Utah area codes: 385/801, 435
Idaho area codes: 208/986
Montana area codes: 406
South Dakota area codes: 605
Nebraska area codes: 308, 402/531
