= Utah State Route 243 =

State highway in Utah, United States

State Route 243

Route information
- Maintained by UDOT
- Length: 1.397 mi (2.248 km)
- Existed: 1953–present

Major junctions
- South end: US 89 in Logan Canyon
- North end: Beaver Mountain Ski Resort

Location
- Country: United States
- State: Utah

Highway system
- Utah State Highway System; Interstate; US; State; Minor; Scenic
← SR-241	→ SR-248

State Route 243 (SR-243) is a 1.397 miles (2.248 km) long state highway in the U.S. state of Utah, connecting U.S. Highway 89 to the Beaver Mountain Ski Resort. The highway is located in the Bear River Mountains, a sub-range of the Wasatch Range.

== Route description ==
The route begins at an intersection with US-89 in Logan Canyon, approximately 28 miles (45 km) east of Logan and 11.4 miles (18.3 km) west of Garden City and Bear Lake. The route proceeds north along Beaver Creek for approximately 0.64 miles (1.03 km), where it turns northwest and begins climbing to the Beaver Mountain Ski Resort. The route then turns to the southwest and continues climbing, ending at the beginning of the parking area for the ski resort.

== History ==
SR-243 was defined in 1953 by the Utah State Legislature as a connection from US-89 to the Beaver Mountain ski resort. The route has not changed since.

== Major intersections ==
The entire route is in Cache County.

Location	mi	km	Destinations	Notes
	0.000	0.000	US 89 (Logan Canyon Scenic Byway)	
	1.397	2.248	Beaver Mountain Ski Resort	
1.000 mi = 1.609 km; 1.000 km = 0.621 mi
