= Crimson Trail =

Crimson Trail is a hike located near the southwestern mouth of Logan Canyon in northeastern Utah. The trail has a path along the top of a cliff formation that runs parallel to the sides of the canyon. It has views of Cache Valley, Beirdneau Peak, Third Dam, and the Wind Caves through spring, summer, and fall. It has many maples that turn red in the fall. The looped trail begins and ends at Spring Hollow Campground, and is about five miles total hiking.
