= Logan Canyon =

Canyon in Northeastern Utah

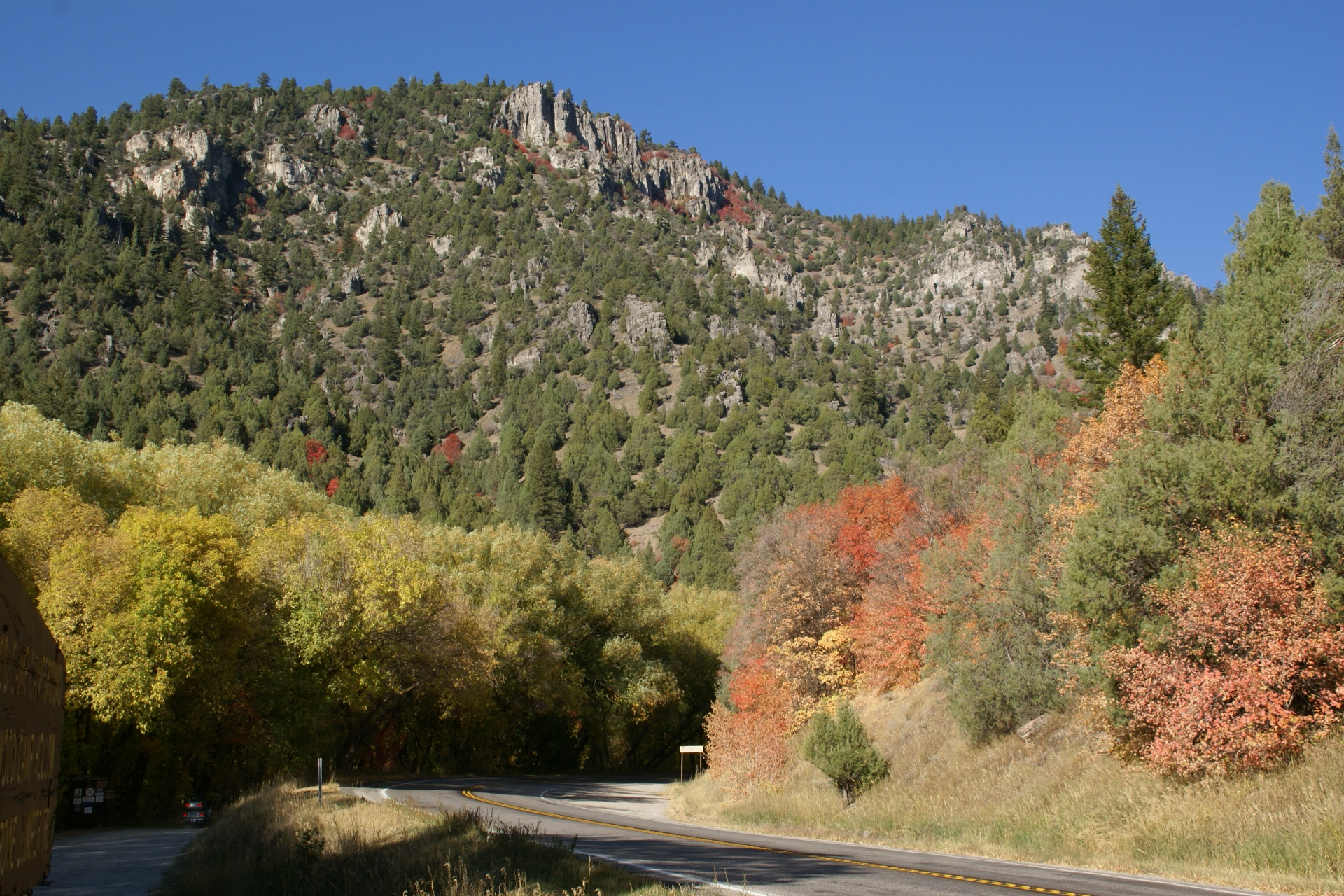
- Logan Canyon Scenic Byway in 2012

- Location within Utah Location within the United States
- Elevation: 7,828 feet (2,386 m)
- Traversed by: US 89

Third Approach
- Location: Cache County, Utah; Rich County, Utah
- Range: Bear River Mountains
- Coordinates: 41°55′32″N 111°28′24″W

Logan Canyon is a canyon in the western United States in northeastern Utah, which cuts its way through the Bear River Mountains, a branch of the Wasatch Range. It is popular for both summer and winter activities, especially rock-climbing, hiking, camping, fishing, snowmobiling, and skiing, at the Beaver Mountain ski resort. The canyon rises to an elevation of approximately 7,800 feet (2,400 m) above sea level, after a vertical climb of about 2,900 feet (880 m). Just beyond the summit is a steep road leading into Bear Lake Valley and scenic overlooks that provide views of deep blue Bear Lake. The western terminus is at Logan in Cache County and the eastern terminus is at Garden City in Rich County.

== Scenic Byway ==
U.S. Route 89 through the canyon has been designated a National Scenic Byway and connects the Cache and Bear Lake valleys.

Recent construction and proposed enhancements to the highway have been the focus of a decades-long confrontation between environmentalists and the Utah Department of Transportation. Some of the improvements have included reconstructing the bridges, which were in poor shape, straightening the road leading to Bear Lake, and reconstructing the Bear Lake Overlook, making it much larger and more attractive and adding basic facilities. The highway is the site of many serious and even fatal traffic accidents given the winding nature of the canyon, the drastic elevation changes, and the poor driving conditions encountered during winter weather.

== Attractions ==
At the mouth of Logan Canyon along the River Trail is the Allen and Alice Stokes Nature Center, a local nonprofit and free nature center, and official educational permittee of the Uinta-Wasatch-Cache National Forest. They offer workshops, hikes, and classes which vary by season.

Among the most popular hiking trails is the treacherous Crimson Trail. It begins at Spring Hollow Campground and ends at Guinivah Campground and is noted for its views, including the 'China Wall' formation. Another popular trail is the Wind Cave trail, which leads to the Wind Caves, a formation of 3 arches in the weathered limestone bedrock, and from which there are views of the China Wall.

Tony Grove Lake is situated on the Logan Canyon National Scenic Byway. A seven-mile paved road climbs to a height of 8050 feet (2454 m) to reach Tony Grove Lake and the Mount Naomi Wilderness area. The area around the lake hosts a day-use picnic area and a campground managed by the United States Forest Service.

The Logan River runs south to southwest through most of the canyon into Cache Valley and is popular for fishing. The river is dammed in three locations near the western mouth of the canyon.

The Beaver Mountain ski area is located just a mile off the highway, a few miles past the midway point from Logan to Bear Lake.

== Climate ==
The Garden City Summit weather station is located near the Bear Lake Overlook, at the eastern end of Logan Canyon.

Climate data for Garden City Summit, Utah, 2010–2020 normals: 7705ft (2348m)
Month	Jan	Feb	Mar	Apr	May	Jun	Jul	Aug	Sep	Oct	Nov	Dec	Year
Mean daily maximum °F (°C)	33.1 (0.6)	34.3 (1.3)	43.0 (6.1)	47.8 (8.8)	55.5 (13.1)	67.9 (19.9)	76.4 (24.7)	75.1 (23.9)	65.9 (18.8)	51.5 (10.8)	39.5 (4.2)	31.0 (−0.6)	51.8 (11.0)
Daily mean °F (°C)	22.8 (−5.1)	23.4 (−4.8)	31.3 (−0.4)	36.3 (2.4)	43.8 (6.6)	53.3 (11.8)	61.0 (16.1)	59.8 (15.4)	51.9 (11.1)	40.3 (4.6)	29.5 (−1.4)	21.2 (−6.0)	39.6 (4.2)
Mean daily minimum °F (°C)	12.6 (−10.8)	12.5 (−10.8)	19.6 (−6.9)	24.7 (−4.1)	32.2 (0.1)	38.7 (3.7)	45.7 (7.6)	44.4 (6.9)	37.8 (3.2)	29.1 (−1.6)	19.6 (−6.9)	11.4 (−11.4)	27.4 (−2.6)
Average precipitation inches (mm)	3.42 (87)	3.17 (81)	3.14 (80)	2.65 (67)	2.79 (71)	1.68 (43)	0.76 (19)	1.07 (27)	1.70 (43)	2.55 (65)	3.05 (77)	4.29 (109)	30.27 (769)
Source 1: XMACIS2
Source 2: NOAA (Precipitation)
