= 17th Utah Territorial Legislature =

The 17th Utah Territorial Legislature was elected on August 5, 1867.

== Session ==
The legislative session convened on January 13, 1868, at the State House in Salt Lake City, and ended on February 25, 1868.

== Members ==
Name	County	Office	Notes
Territorial Council:
Ezra T. Benson	Cache		
Thomas Callister	Millard		
Albert Carrington	Salt Lake		
Hector C. Haight	Davis		
Leonard E. Harrington	Utah		
Orson Hyde	Sanpete		
Aaron Johnson	Utah		
George A. Smith	Iron	President	
Abraham O. Smoot	Salt Lake		
Erastus Snow	Washington		
Lorenzo Snow	Box Elder		
Wilford Woodruff	Salt Lake		
Joseph A. Young	Salt Lake		
Territorial House of Representatives:
Reddick N. Allred	Sanpete		
William W. Cluff	Summit/Green River		
David Evans	Utah		
Lorin Farr	Weber		
Jacob Gates	Washington		
Thomas H. Giles	Wasatch		Elected December 9, 1867
Christopher Layton	Davis		
Francis M. Lyman	Millard		
Peter Maughan	Cache		
Philemon C. Merrill	Morgan		
Jonathan Midgley	Juab		
Joseph S. Murdock	Wasatch		Elected August 5, 1867, resigned prior to session
William B. Pace	Utah		
Orson Pratt	Salt Lake		
Enoch Reese	Salt Lake		
Charles C. Rich	Richland		
Albert P. Rockwood	Salt Lake		
James Henry Rollins	Beaver		
John Rowberry	Tooele		
Joseph F. Smith	Salt Lake		
Silas S. Smith	Iron		
George Taylor	Sanpete		
John Taylor	Salt Lake	Speaker	
Albert K. Thurber	Utah		
Chauncey W. West	Weber		
Jonathan C. Wright	Box Elder		
Brigham Young Jr.	Salt Lake		

== Major Legislation ==
=== Appropriations ===
- Territorial Appropriation Bill (February 21, 1868)

=== Criminal Laws ===
- An Act concerning Libel (February 21, 1868)

=== Incorporations of Cities and Counties ===
- An Act changing the name of Richland County to Rich County (January 29, 1868)*
- An Act changing the name of Great Salt Lake City and Great Salt Lake County (January 29, 1868)
- An Act to incorporate Deseret City, in Millard County (February 3, 1868)
- An Act incorporating the City of Smithfield, in Cache County (February 6, 1868)
- An Act incorporating Richmond City, in Cache County (February 6, 1868)
- An Act incorporating Kaysville City, in Davis County (February 13, 1868)
- An Act incorporating the City of Morgan, in Morgan County (February 13, 1868)
- An Act incorporating Parowan City, in Iron County (February 13, 1868)
- An Act incorporating the City of Ephraim, in Sanpete County (February 14, 1868)
- An Act incorporating Cedar City, in Iron County (February 18, 1868)
- An Act incorporating Franklin City, in Cache County (February 19, 1868)
- An Act changing the County Seat of Morgan County (February 19, 1868)
- An Act incorporating Mount Pleasant, in Sanpete County (February 20, 1868)
- An Act amending the Charters of the Incorporated Cities in the Territory of Utah (February 21, 1868)
