= Rich County, Utah =

County in Utah, United States

- County
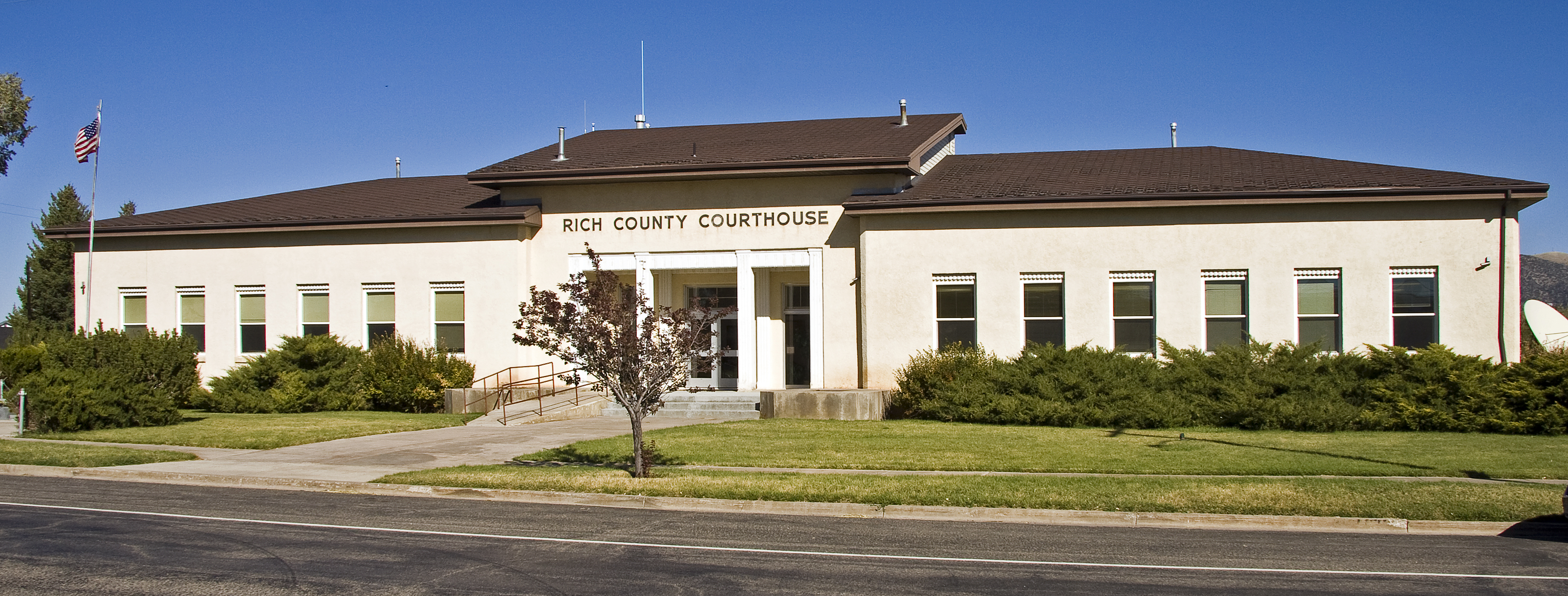
- Rich County Courthouse, Randolph

- Location within the U.S. state of Utah
- Coordinates: 41°37′N 111°14′W
- Country: United States
- State: Utah
- Founded: January 16, 1864 (created); May 5, 1864 (organized)
- Named for: Charles C. Rich
- Seat: Randolph
- Largest town: Garden City

Area
  - Total: 1,086 sq mi (2,810 km^{2})
  - Land: 1,029 sq mi (2,670 km^{2})
  - Water: 58 sq mi (150 km^{2}) 5.3%

Population (2020)
  - Total: 2,510
  - Estimate (2025): 2,687 ▲
  - Density: 2.4/sq mi (0.93/km^{2})
- Time zone: UTC−7 (Mountain)
  - Summer (DST): UTC−6 (MDT)
- Congressional district: 1st
- Website: www.richcounty.gov

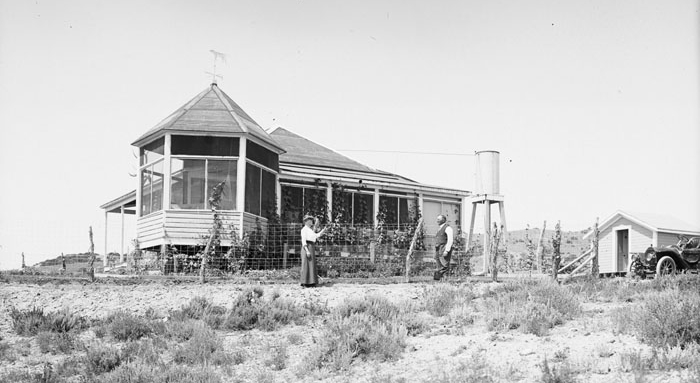
Rich County farm, Neponset, 1912

Rich County is a county in the U.S. state of Utah. As of the 2020 United States census, the population was 2,510, making it the fourth-least populous county in Utah. Its county seat is Randolph, and the largest town is Garden City. The county was created in 1864. It was named for an early LDS apostle, Charles C. Rich.

The southern half of Bear Lake and the Bear Lake Valley lies on the northern edge of the county. The Bear River Valley lies in most of the eastern portion of the county. The elevation of these valleys is close to 6,000 feet (1,800 m), and the rest of the county is covered by mountains, including the Bear River Range. Because of the high elevation, the climate is cold in winter and mild in summer, and the population is limited.

== History ==
Various Native American peoples inhabited the Rich County region for thousands of years. A prehistoric bison jump, dated to about 1,300 years before present, is located near the city of Woodruff, Utah

Like all of modern-day Utah, Rich County was claimed by the Spanish Empire from the 1500s as part of Alta California, and later was part of Mexico. However, neither the Spanish nor Mexicans had a major or permanent presence in the area. The 1848 Treaty of Guadalupe Hidalgo placed the region under control of the United States.

Rich County was believed to have first been visited by European-descended explorers in 1811, when trapper Joseph Miller discovered the Bear River. In 1827, the first annual rendezvous of trappers occurred on the south shore of Bear Lake, a tradition that is still marked today. The site is also preserved as part of Bear Lake State Park. The Oregon Trail, a heavily traveled route to the Northwest Territories, passed through the upper part of the future county (as defined by its original description). Many emigrants traveling to the NW Territories also traveled around the south end of Bear Lake instead of hewing to the more heavily traveled route through present-day Idaho, although this adds to the Oregon Trail is usually not shown on maps of the route.

The Utah Territory had been initially settled by Mormon pioneers beginning in 1847, but no Mormons permanently moved into the Rich County area until after 1862. The US Congress passed the Homestead Act of 1862, opening this area to settlement. Mormon leader Brigham Young, fearing this would lead to an influx of non-Mormons, called members of his flock to move to the area and begin its settlement. The first settlement within the county's present boundary was Round Valley in 1863; located southwest of Laketown (settled 1864), it is now a ghost town. Randolph was settled in 1870. Originally created as Richland County on January 16, 1864, the name was shortened to Rich on January 29, 1868, by the 17th Utah Territorial Legislature. The boundary as originally defined extended beyond Utah into southwestern Wyoming and southeast Idaho. However, on July 25, 1868, the Wyoming Territory was created by the federal government, and all of the Rich County area east of the 34th meridian west from Washington became part of the new territory and thus was lost to Rich. The 1870 census for Rich County, Utah Territory enumerates a total of 1,672 residents in the eight Idaho communities of Bennington, Bloomington, Fish Haven, Liberty, Montpelier, Ovid, Paris and St. Charles. Utah Territory adjusted the county's boundary on February 16, 1872, by moving a small portion previous Summit County into Rich. The final adjustment to county boundaries was made on January 5, 1875, when Idaho Territory took the eight aforementioned communities and others in the Bear Lake Valley to form Bear Lake County.

The present county building was constructed in Randolph in 1940.

== Geography ==
Rich County lies in the upper northeastern corner of Utah. Its northern border abuts the south border of the state of Idaho, and its east border abuts the west border of the state of Wyoming. The Bear River flows eastward out of the middle part of the county into Wyoming. The terrain is rugged, with less than ten percent of the area under cultivation. Over half of the county's area is used for cattle grazing. The county terrain slopes from the Bear River Mountain crests which form its western border, toward the east. The highest point is along its northern border known as Bridger Peak, at 9,255 ft (2,821 m) ASL. The county has a total area of 1,086 square miles (2,810 km^{2}), of which 1,029 square miles (2,670 km^{2}) is land and 58 square miles (150 km^{2}) (5.3%) is water.

The Bear River Valley is created by the Bear River and consists of the east-central portion of the county. The towns of Randolph and Woodruff lie in this farming-oriented valley. Its high elevation makes this region one of the coldest areas in the state. Woodruff has a record low of −50 °F (−46 °C) and temperatures rarely exceed 90 °F (32 °C) during the summer. Snow is heavy in late autumn, winter, and early spring and remains on the ground for the entire winter.

Further to the north lies the southern half of Bear Lake Valley, which contains Bear Lake. This lake is famous for its deep blue water, beaches, and surrounding mountains. The Bear River Mountains lies along the western edge of the county, and Logan Canyon opens up to the west of Garden City, which is a quaint tourist town that lies on the western edge of Bear Lake. Laketown lies at the southern edge of the lake. Three sections of the coastline are protected by Bear Lake State Park. The eastern slopes of the Bear River Range are an increasingly popular location for cabins.

In both major valleys, temperature inversions are a major problem during winter. These temperature inversions can bring extremely cold temperatures, fog, smog, and haze to the valleys, lasting for weeks at a time.

=== Major highways ===
- U.S. Route 89 descends from the Bear River Mountains through Logan Canyon and turns north at Garden City along the Bear Lake shoreline.
- State Route 16 heads south from Sage Creek Junction through Randolph and Woodruff before entering Wyoming northwest of Evanston.
- State Route 30 heads south from Garden City through Laketown and climbs east through the mountains to the Wyoming border.
- State Route 39 heads west into the Wasatch Range from Woodruff on its way to Huntsville and eventually Ogden. However, this highway is closed through the mountains during the winter months as heavy snow blocks the road.
- Interstate 80 lies in Summit County near the Rich County border but is only accessible from Rich County through Wyoming.

=== Adjacent counties ===
- Bear Lake County, Idaho - north
- Lincoln County, Wyoming - northeast
- Uinta County, Wyoming - southeast
- Summit County - south
- Morgan County - southwest
- Weber County - west
- Cache County - west
- Franklin County, Idaho - northwest

=== Protected areas ===
- Cache National Forest (part)
- Bear Lake State Park
  - Rendezvous Beach State Park
  - Bear Lake Marina State Park
  - East Side State Park

=== Lakes ===
- Basin Beaver Ponds
- Bear Lake (part)
- Big Spring (in Round Valley)
- Birch Creek Reservoirs
  - Birch Creek Reservoir #1
  - Birch Creek Reservoir #2
- Blue Grass Pond
- Bluff Spring
- Bug Lake
- Cheney Springs
- Chicken Spring
- Cold Spring
- Cook Reservoir
- Crane Reservoir
- Dairy Ridge Reservoir
- Dry Basin Reservoir
- Dry Canyon Spring
- Dry Hollow Reservoir
- Dry Lake
- Duck Creek Red Spring
- Eagle Springs
- Falula Spring
- Green Fork Reservoir
- Green Fork Sink
- Hatch Spring
- Higgins Hollow Reservoir
- Jacobsen Springs
- Jebo Spring
- Jebo Troughs Spring
- Kearl Reservoir
- Kearl Spring
- Keg Spring (in McKay Hollow)
- Lamb Canyon Spring
- Lewis Spring
- Limestone Reservoir
- Little Crawford Spring
- Little Creek Reservoir
- Little Long Hill Reservoir
- Live Slough
- Lodgepole Reservoir
- Longhurst Spring
- Lower North Eden Reservoir
- McKinnon Spring
- Millie Spring
- Mud Spring (near South Lake)
- Negro Dan Spring
- Neponset Reservoir
- Nick Reservoir
- North Cheney Spring
- North Lake
- Peggy Hollow Spring
- Petes Spring
- Phosphate Spring
- Rabbit Spring (near Big Bend Spring)
- Ranger Spring
- Red Springs
- Richardson Spring
- Rock Spring
- Sage Hollow Reservoir
- Saleratus Reservoir Number 1
- Saleratus Reservoir Number 2
- Saleratus Reservoir Number 3
- Shearing Corral Reservoir
- Six Bit Spring
- Sixmile Reservoir
- South Big Creek Reservoir Number 2
- South Eden Reservoir
- South Lake
- Southwick Spring
- Suttons Reservoir
- Swan Peak Pond
- Swan Spring
- Trough Spring
- Upper North Eden Reservoir
- Wheeler Spring
- Woodruff Reservoir

== Demographics ==
Historical population
Census	Pop.	Note	%±
1870	1,955		—
1880	1,263		−35.4%
1890	1,527		20.9%
1900	1,946		27.4%
1910	1,883		−3.2%
1920	1,890		0.4%
1930	1,873		−0.9%
1940	2,028		8.3%
1950	1,673		−17.5%
1960	1,685		0.7%
1970	1,615		−4.2%
1980	2,100		30.0%
1990	1,725		−17.9%
2000	1,961		13.7%
2010	2,264		15.5%
2020	2,510		10.9%
2025 (est.)	2,687	▲	7.1%
US Decennial Census; 1790–1960 1900–1990; 1990–2000 2010 2020

=== 2020 census ===
According to the 2020 United States census and 2020 American Community Survey, there were 2,510 people in Rich County with a population density of 2.4 people per square mile (0.9/km^{2}). Among non-Hispanic or Latino people, the racial makeup was 2,329 (92.8%) White, 11 (0.4%) African American, 1 (0.0%) Native American, 2 (0.1%) Asian, 4 (0.2%) Pacific Islander, 1 (0.0%) from other races, and 65 (2.6%) from two or more races. 97 (3.9%) people were Hispanic or Latino.

Rich County, Utah – Racial and ethnic composition Note: the US Census treats Hispanic/Latino as an ethnic category. This table excludes Latinos from the racial categories and assigns them to a separate category. Hispanics/Latinos may be of any race.
Race / Ethnicity (NH = Non-Hispanic)	Pop 2000	Pop 2010	Pop 2020	% 2000	% 2010	% 2020
White alone (NH)	1,908	2,131	2,329	97.30%	94.13%	92.79%
Black or African American alone (NH)	0	0	11	0.00%	0.00%	0.44%
Native American or Alaska Native alone (NH)	1	16	1	0.05%	0.71%	0.04%
Asian alone (NH)	8	2	2	0.41%	0.09%	0.08%
Pacific Islander alone (NH)	0	1	4	0.00%	0.04%	0.16%
Other race alone (NH)	0	2	1	0.00%	0.09%	0.04%
Mixed race or Multiracial (NH)	8	16	65	0.41%	0.71%	2.59%
Hispanic or Latino (any race)	36	96	97	1.84%	4.24%	3.86%
Total	1,961	2,264	2,510	100.00%	100.00%	100.00%

There were 1,309 (52.15%) males and 1,201 (47.85%) females, and the population distribution by age was 767 (30.6%) under the age of 18, 1,276 (50.8%) from 18 to 64, and 467 (18.6%) who were at least 65 years old. The median age was 38.0 years.

There were 886 households in Rich County with an average size of 2.83 of which 660 (74.5%) were families and 226 (25.5%) were non-families. Among all families, 577 (65.1%) were married couples, 32 (3.6%) were male householders with no spouse, and 51 (5.8%) were female householders with no spouse. Among all non-families, 207 (23.4%) were a single person living alone and 19 (2.1%) were two or more people living together. 322 (36.3%) of all households had children under the age of 18. 710 (80.1%) of households were owner-occupied while 176 (19.9%) were renter-occupied.

The median income for a Rich County household was $63,917 and the median family income was $73,819, with a per-capita income of $23,943. The median income for males that were full-time employees was $58,125 and for females $35,590. 10.5% of the population and 6.5% of families were below the poverty line.

In terms of education attainment, out of the 1,406 people in Rich County 25 years or older, 61 (4.3%) had not completed high school, 397 (28.2%) had a high school diploma or equivalency, 638 (45.4%) had some college or associate degree, 208 (14.8%) had a bachelor's degree, and 102 (7.3%) had a graduate or professional degree.

=== Ancestry ===
As of the 2010 census, the largest self-reported ancestry groups in Rich County were:

- 40.7% were of English ancestry
- 14.2% were of German ancestry
- 10.2% were of Scottish ancestry
- 8.5% were of "American" ancestry
- 5.8% were of Irish ancestry
- 5.6% were of Danish ancestry.

== Communities ==
Map of Rich County communities

=== Towns ===
- Garden City
- Laketown (originally named "Last Chance")
- Randolph (county seat)
- Woodruff

=== Census-designated place ===
- Garden

=== Ghost towns ===
- Argyle
- Pickelville (former town annexed by Garden City in 1979)

== Politics and government ==
Rich County voters are traditionally Republican. The county has not selected the Democratic Party candidate in a national election since 1944.

State elected offices
Position	District	Name	Affiliation	First elected
Senate	25	Chris D. Wilson	Republican	2020
House of Representatives	53	Kera Birkeland	Republican	2020
Board of Education	1	Jennie Earl	Nonpartisan	2018

United States presidential election results for Rich County, Utah
Year	Republican		Democratic		Third party(ies)	
Year	No.	%	No.	%	No.	%
1896	162	28.42%	408	71.58%	0	0.00%
1900	387	57.76%	282	42.09%	1	0.15%
1904	439	64.65%	240	35.35%	0	0.00%
1908	425	59.44%	285	39.86%	5	0.70%
1912	329	48.89%	238	35.36%	106	15.75%
1916	325	41.72%	454	58.28%	0	0.00%
1920	449	66.92%	222	33.08%	0	0.00%
1924	403	62.48%	211	32.71%	31	4.81%
1928	470	67.72%	224	32.28%	0	0.00%
1932	398	45.91%	469	54.09%	0	0.00%
1936	388	44.09%	488	55.45%	4	0.45%
1940	447	48.48%	475	51.52%	0	0.00%
1944	394	49.94%	395	50.06%	0	0.00%
1948	399	52.09%	366	47.78%	1	0.13%
1952	569	69.39%	251	30.61%	0	0.00%
1956	561	68.92%	253	31.08%	0	0.00%
1960	511	63.72%	291	36.28%	0	0.00%
1964	435	57.16%	326	42.84%	0	0.00%
1968	525	70.28%	183	24.50%	39	5.22%
1972	604	79.58%	120	15.81%	35	4.61%
1976	541	67.12%	248	30.77%	17	2.11%
1980	762	81.15%	143	15.23%	34	3.62%
1984	797	85.61%	131	14.07%	3	0.32%
1988	621	72.21%	234	27.21%	5	0.58%
1992	525	59.93%	154	17.58%	197	22.49%
1996	523	65.70%	179	22.49%	94	11.81%
2000	736	81.51%	152	16.83%	15	1.66%
2004	922	88.91%	109	10.51%	6	0.58%
2008	831	82.36%	154	15.26%	24	2.38%
2012	915	90.15%	83	8.18%	17	1.67%
2016	797	71.29%	104	9.30%	217	19.41%
2020	1,157	84.89%	180	13.21%	26	1.91%
2024	1,211	83.69%	214	14.79%	22	1.52%

== See also ==
- National Register of Historic Places listings in Rich County, Utah
