= Bear Lake sculpin =

Conservation status
- Vulnerable (IUCN 3.1)

Scientific classification
- Kingdom: Animalia
- Phylum: Chordata
- Class: Actinopterygii
- Order: Perciformes
- Suborder: Cottoidei
- Family: Cottidae
- Genus: Cottus
- Species: C. extensus

Binomial name
- Cottus extensus R. M. Bailey & C. E. Bond, 1963

Species of fish

The Bear Lake sculpin (Cottus extensus) occasionally referred to incorrectly as a "bullhead", is a species of freshwater sculpin endemic to Bear Lake on the Utah-Idaho border. It is one of only four sculpins native to Utah, and the only extant lake-dwelling sculpin in Utah (see Utah Lake sculpin). Although the fish is only native to Bear Lake, it has been introduced and established in Flaming Gorge Reservoir.

The Bear Lake sculpin is a benthic fish and feeds on invertebrates. It is an important forage species for the native Bear Lake strain of Bonneville cutthroat trout and the nonnative Lake trout in Bear lake.

The species spawns between the months of April and May among rocks close to shore, and is listed as a Wildlife Species of Concern by the Utah Division of Wildlife Resources.
