= Beaver Mountain =

Ski resort in Utah, United States

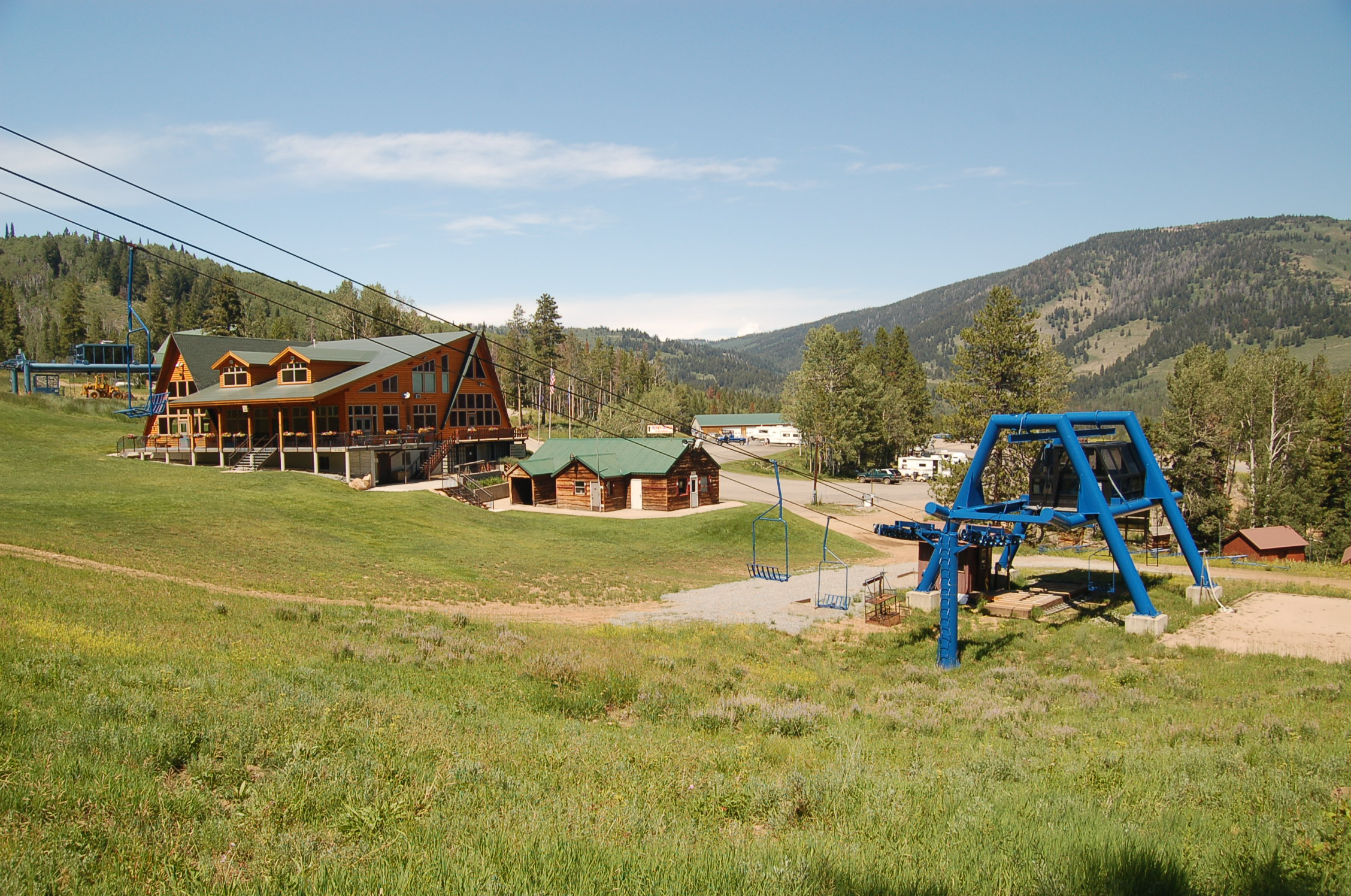
- Looking down from one of the slopes, the lift, the lodge and the ticket cabin as well as some of the summer camping sites are visible, 2011

- Location in Utah Beaver Mountain (the United States)
- Location: Cache National Forest; Logan Canyon, Utah, United States
- Nearest city: Logan, Utah; 27 miles (43 km); Salt Lake City; 110 miles (180 km)
- Coordinates: 41.968°N 111.541°W
- Vertical: 1,600 ft (488 m)
- Top elevation: 8,800 ft (2,682 m)
- Base elevation: 7,200 ft (2,195 m)
- Skiable area: 664 acres (2.69 km^{2})
- Trails: 47; 35% easiest 40% more difficult 25% most difficult
- Lift system: 4 chairlifts – 3 triples – 1 double 2 surface lift
- Terrain parks: 2
- Snowfall: 400 in (1,020 cm)
- Snowmaking: none
- Night skiing: 1 lift – "Little Beaver"
- Website: skithebeav.com

Beaver Mountain is a ski area in the western United States, in northern Utah. First opened 87 years ago in 1939, it is located near the summit of Logan Canyon in the Bear River Mountains, west of Bear Lake and near the border with Idaho. While smaller and less developed than a number of Utah ski resorts, Beaver Mountain is very popular with residents of nearby Logan, Utah State University, the surrounding Cache Valley, and the Bear Lake region, including southeastern Idaho.

The slopes of the mountain are predominantly east-facing, and it receives somewhat less snowfall than the resorts facing west. Since it does not currently employ snowmaking equipment, the ski area is entirely dependent upon the (usually) ample natural snowfall, and therefore often opens several weeks later than most other resorts in Utah.

"The Beav" is located 27 miles (43 km) northeast of Logan, just a mile (1.6 km) off of US-89, the Logan Canyon Scenic Byway, a national scenic byway. Garden City, Utah is the closest town, which is around 15 miles (24 km) away. The Idaho border (42nd parallel) is less than three miles (5 km) north and Bear Lake is approximately six miles (10 km) due east. Salt Lake City is 110 miles (180 km) south.

The ski area is owned and operated by the Seeholzer family: founded by Harry (1902–1968) and succeeded by son Ted (1932–2013), it continues as a family operation under Ted's son Travis.

== Facilities ==
Facilities at Beaver include a day lodge with grill restaurant, a full-service ski rental operation and a ski shop. While alpine skiing and snowboarding are the most popular activities, there is a dedicated area for Nordic (cross-country) skiers near the base.

Beaver Mountain also owns a small office near North Logan.

== Lifts ==
The Little Beaver Lift (a triple chairlift) serves primarily beginner terrain. Originally a double chair, it became a triple in 2011; the new lift adds about 100 yards to the run, by incorporating an area previously served by a rope tow, the other runs originating from the top of the Little Beaver Lift include "Little Beaver," "Tiny Tim," and access to the "Goat Trail" cat track, from which access can be had to the "Beaver Face Lift" and "Harry's Dream Lift," further up the slope.

The Beaver's Face Lift (double) serves only intermediate and advanced runs. The first chairlift on the mountain, it began operating 64 years ago in late 1961. It offers access to intermediate and expert terrain.

Harry's Dream Lift (triple) was originally a double chair, installed in the fall of 1969. Already slated for replacement, a failed bearing in March 2006 closed the lift for the balance of the season. Over that summer and fall, the entire lift was replaced by a more modern triple chair. It unloads near the summit. The lift is named for founder Harold Seeholzer, who died of cancer in 1968, the year prior to its installation.

Marge's Triple Lift provides access to a half-dozen intermediate and advanced runs, as well as the larger of two terrain parks on the mountain. It can only be accessed by taking the Harry's Dream Lift. Marge is the daughter-in-law of the founder, married to his second son, Ted. The couple has owned the area since 1997; Ted was previously the general manager and Marge handled ticket sales.
