= Pickelville, Utah =

Coordinates: 41°54′45″N 111°23′18″W

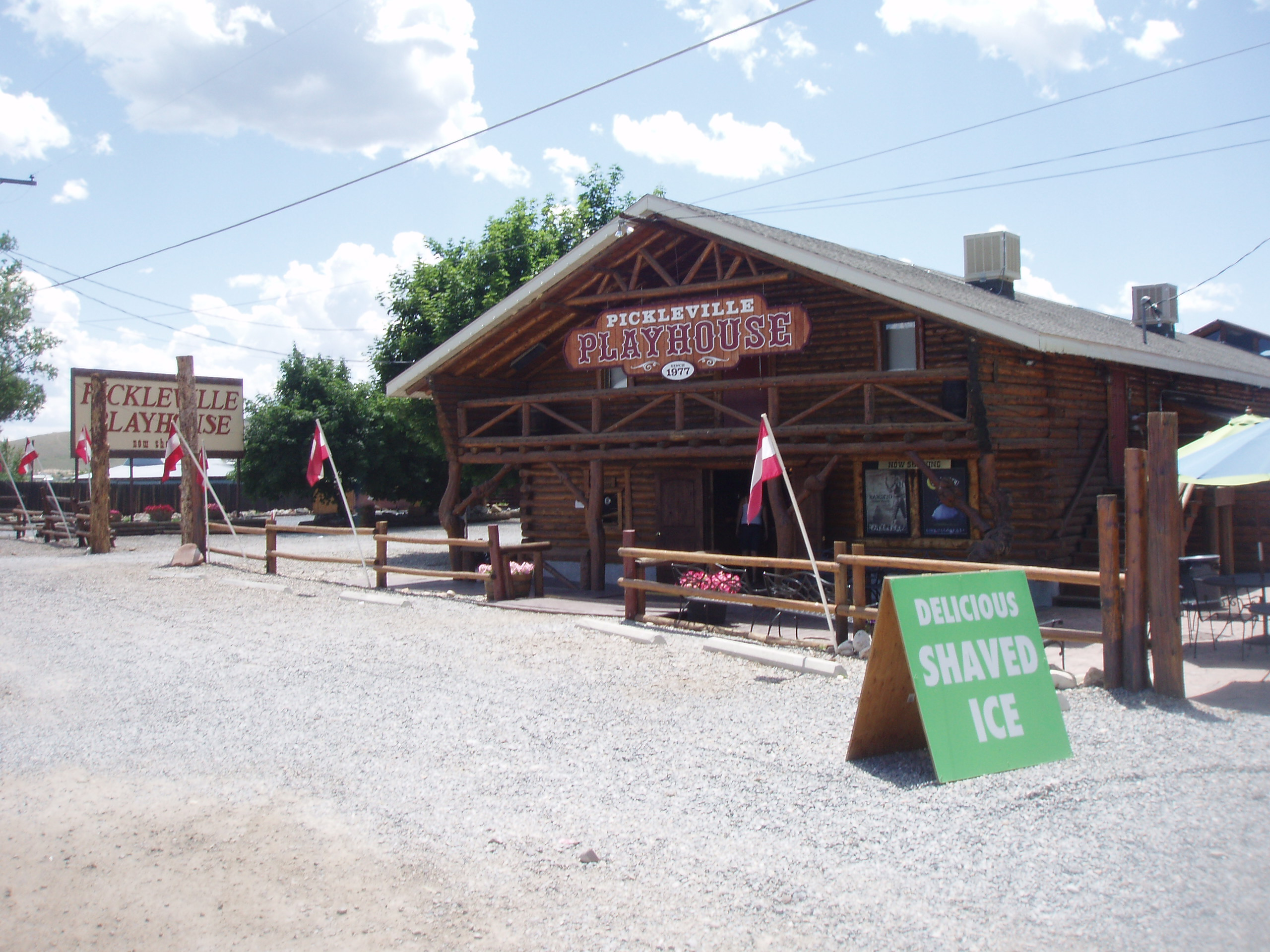
Pickleville Playhouse

Historical population
Census	Pop.	Note	%±
1940	87		—
1950	96		10.3%
1960	94		−2.1%
1970	106		12.8%

Pickleville was a small town located near the western shore of Bear Lake, 121 miles (195 km) northeast of Salt Lake City, in Rich County, Utah, United States. In 1979 it became part of Garden City.

The town of Pickleville was founded in 1879, about 3 miles (4.8 km) south of Garden City. Incorporated in 1935, the town was named for Charles C. Pickel, who is said to have been either an engineer who supervised the town's culinary water project, or a federal government official who helped secure funding for the project from the Public Works Administration. To further expand the water system, Pickelville merged with Garden City in 1979.

Since 1916, the Pickleville area has been home to the Ideal Beach Amusement Company. The Pickleville Playhouse, a community musical theater, has been in business since 1977, performing a melodrama and a Broadway-style show every summer.

== Climate ==
This climatic region is typified by large seasonal temperature differences, with warm to hot (and often humid) summers and cold (sometimes severely cold) winters. According to the Köppen Climate Classification system, Pickelville has a humid continental climate, abbreviated "Dfb" on climate maps.
