= Laketown, Utah =

Town in the state of Utah, United States

- Town
- Location in Rich County and the state of Utah

- Location of Utah in the United States
- Coordinates: 41°49′39″N 111°19′27″W
- Country: United States
- State: Utah
- County: Rich
- Settled: 1864
- Incorporated: July 1945
- Named for: Bear Lake

Area
  - Total: 2.53 sq mi (6.56 km^{2})
  - Land: 2.52 sq mi (6.52 km^{2})
  - Water: 0.015 sq mi (0.04 km^{2})
- Elevation: 5,971 ft (1,820 m)

Population (2020)
  - Total: 299
  - Estimate (2019): 276
  - Density: 109.7/sq mi (42.35/km^{2})
- Time zone: UTC-7 (Mountain (MST))
  - Summer (DST): UTC-6 (MDT)
- ZIP code: 84038
- Area code: 435
- FIPS code: 49-42560
- GNIS feature ID: 2412869
- Website: laketown.utah.gov

Laketown is a town in Rich County, Utah, United States. The population was 299 at the 2020 census. The town is named for nearby Bear Lake.

== Geography ==
According to the United States Census Bureau, the town has a total area of 1.0 square mile (2.6 km^{2}), all land.

=== Climate ===
This climatic region is typified by large seasonal temperature differences, with warm to hot summers and cold (sometimes severely cold) winters. According to the Köppen Climate Classification system, Laketown has a humid continental climate, abbreviated "Dfb" on climate maps.

Climate data for Laketown, Utah, 1991–2020 normals, extremes 1900–present
Month	Jan	Feb	Mar	Apr	May	Jun	Jul	Aug	Sep	Oct	Nov	Dec	Year
Record high °F (°C)	59 (15)	60 (16)	73 (23)	80 (27)	95 (35)	96 (36)	99 (37)	98 (37)	90 (32)	86 (30)	69 (21)	63 (17)	99 (37)
Mean maximum °F (°C)	45.1 (7.3)	48.8 (9.3)	58.7 (14.8)	70.5 (21.4)	77.5 (25.3)	85.5 (29.7)	89.4 (31.9)	88.4 (31.3)	83.7 (28.7)	74.1 (23.4)	60.5 (15.8)	49.2 (9.6)	90.1 (32.3)
Mean daily maximum °F (°C)	30.5 (−0.8)	32.8 (0.4)	42.6 (5.9)	52.8 (11.6)	62.2 (16.8)	72.5 (22.5)	80.7 (27.1)	79.8 (26.6)	70.4 (21.3)	57.1 (13.9)	42.0 (5.6)	31.8 (−0.1)	54.6 (12.6)
Daily mean °F (°C)	22.2 (−5.4)	23.7 (−4.6)	32.6 (0.3)	41.4 (5.2)	49.7 (9.8)	58.1 (14.5)	65.8 (18.8)	64.8 (18.2)	56.3 (13.5)	45.1 (7.3)	32.9 (0.5)	23.9 (−4.5)	43.0 (6.1)
Mean daily minimum °F (°C)	13.9 (−10.1)	14.6 (−9.7)	22.6 (−5.2)	29.9 (−1.2)	37.2 (2.9)	43.7 (6.5)	50.9 (10.5)	49.9 (9.9)	42.2 (5.7)	33.1 (0.6)	23.9 (−4.5)	16.0 (−8.9)	31.5 (−0.3)
Mean minimum °F (°C)	−4.6 (−20.3)	−4.4 (−20.2)	6.0 (−14.4)	17.2 (−8.2)	25.1 (−3.8)	32.5 (0.3)	41.0 (5.0)	39.2 (4.0)	29.5 (−1.4)	18.7 (−7.4)	6.0 (−14.4)	−1.0 (−18.3)	−9.4 (−23.0)
Record low °F (°C)	−37 (−38)	−36 (−38)	−22 (−30)	−3 (−19)	16 (−9)	22 (−6)	29 (−2)	22 (−6)	13 (−11)	−3 (−19)	−17 (−27)	−27 (−33)	−37 (−38)
Average precipitation inches (mm)	1.29 (33)	1.22 (31)	1.28 (33)	1.66 (42)	1.94 (49)	1.09 (28)	0.60 (15)	0.90 (23)	1.06 (27)	1.30 (33)	1.29 (33)	1.27 (32)	14.90 (378)
Average snowfall inches (cm)	19.5 (50)	16.4 (42)	11.0 (28)	7.1 (18)	1.2 (3.0)	0.1 (0.25)	0.0 (0.0)	0.0 (0.0)	0.2 (0.51)	2.5 (6.4)	9.2 (23)	16.7 (42)	83.9 (213)
Average precipitation days (≥ 0.01 in)	8.0	7.4	7.7	8.0	8.6	4.6	3.6	4.8	4.8	6.6	6.9	8.1	79.1
Average snowy days (≥ 0.1 in)	7.3	6.3	4.5	2.4	0.5	0.0	0.0	0.0	0.1	1.2	3.7	6.6	32.6
Source: NOAA

== Demographics ==
Historical population
Census	Pop.	Note	%±
1870	127		—
1880	269		111.8%
1890	321		19.3%
1900	245		−23.7%
1910	218		−11.0%
1920	321		47.2%
1930	297		−7.5%
1940	367		23.6%
1950	217		−40.9%
1960	211		−2.8%
1970	208		−1.4%
1980	271		30.3%
1990	261		−3.7%
2000	188		−28.0%
2010	248		31.9%
2020	299		20.6%
U.S. Decennial Census

As of the census of 2000, there were 188 people, 60 households, and 51 families residing in the town. The population density was 186.3 people per square mile (71.9/km^{2}). There were 89 housing units at an average density of 88.2 per square mile (34.0/km^{2}). The racial makeup of the town was 96.28% White, 3.19% Asian, and 0.53% from two or more races.

There were 60 households, out of which 48.3% had children under the age of 18 living with them, 80.0% were married couples living together, 1.7% had a female householder with no husband present, and 15.0% were non-families. 15.0% of all households were made up of individuals, and 8.3% had someone living alone who was 65 years of age or older. The average household size was 3.13 and the average family size was 3.51.

In the town, the population was spread out, with 32.4% under the age of 18, 8.5% from 18 to 24, 18.6% from 25 to 44, 27.7% from 45 to 64, and 12.8% who were 65 years of age or older. The median age was 40 years. For every 100 females, there were 97.9 males. For every 100 females age 18 and over, there were 111.7 males.

The median income for a household in the town was $60,893, and the median income for a family was $65,000. Males had a median income of $40,972 versus $31,875 for females. The per capita income for the town was $23,519. About 3.6% of families and 7.0% of the population were below the poverty line, including 13.3% of those under the age of eighteen and 10.5% of those 65 or over.

== Notable person ==
- John Brown, fantasy author
