= Naomi Peak =

Mountain in northern Utah, United States

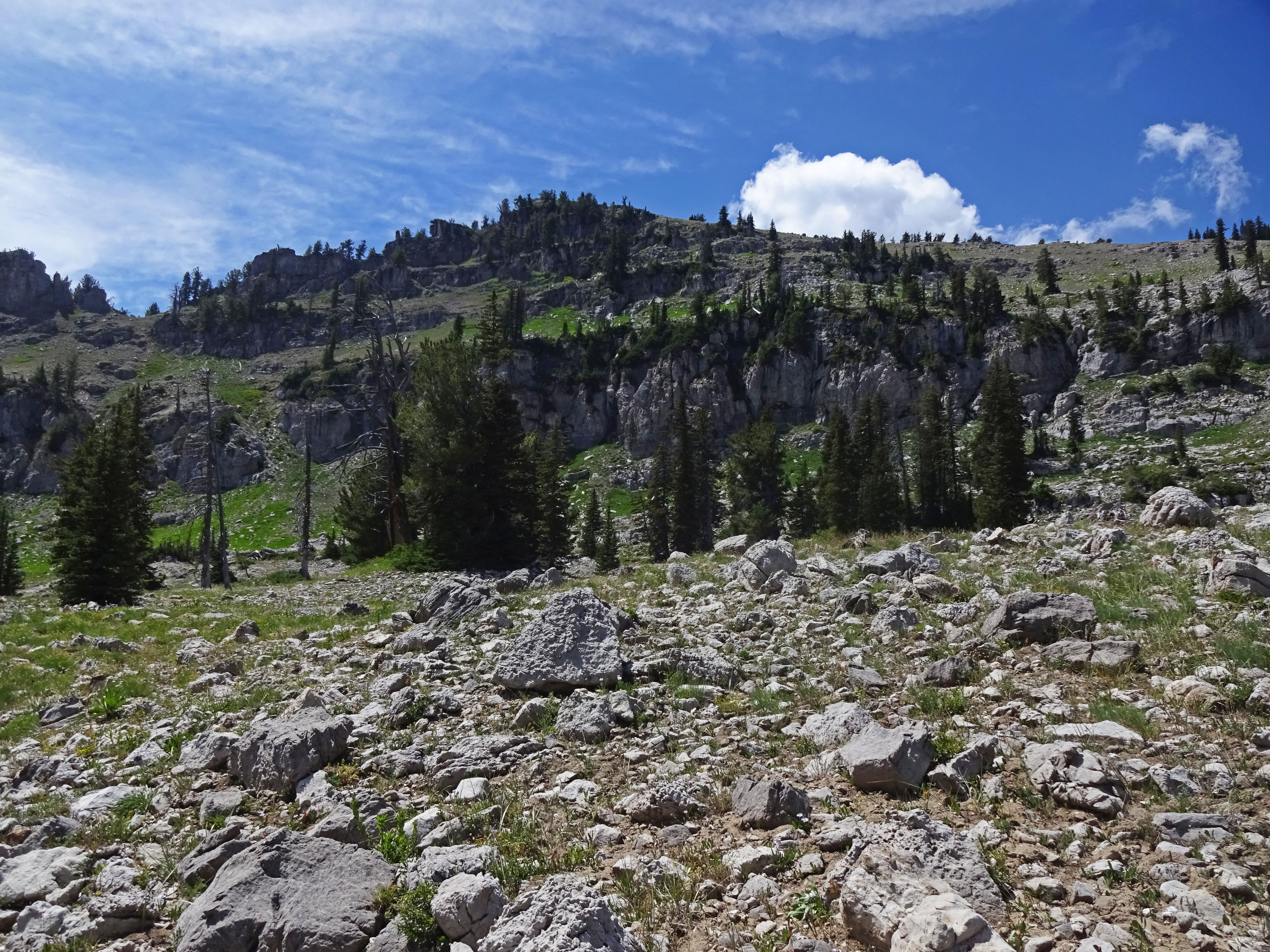
- Naomi Peak, August 2016

Highest point
- Elevation: 9,983 ft (3,043 m) NAVD 88
- Prominence: 3,159 ft (963 m)
- Listing: Utah county high points 24th
- Coordinates: 41°54′41″N 111°40′31″W

Geography
- Location within Utah
- Location: Cache County, Utah, U.S.
- Parent range: Bear River Mountains

Naomi Peak, or Mount Naomi, is the highest peak in the Bear River Range in northern Utah and southern Idaho, United States.

== Description ==
The summit is located northeast of Logan, in the Mount Naomi Wilderness of the Wasatch-Cache National Forest. Several trails from the north, east, and south converge at Mount Naomi. The most traveled trail (approximately 3.3 miles (5.3 km) one way) is likely the one that starts at the Tony Grove Lake parking area just east of Naomi Peak. The road leading in to Tony Grove from U.S. Route 89 is entirely paved and easily accessible in the summer months.

== Climate ==
Climate data for Naomi Peak 41.9085 N, 111.6776 W, Elevation: 9,573 ft (2,918 m) (1991–2020 normals)
| Month | Jan | Feb | Mar | Apr | May | Jun | Jul | Aug | Sep | Oct | Nov | Dec | Year |
|---|---|---|---|---|---|---|---|---|---|---|---|---|---|
| Mean daily maximum °F (°C) | 24.8 (−4.0) | 27.3 (−2.6) | 32.8 (0.4) | 39.0 (3.9) | 48.6 (9.2) | 59.8 (15.4) | 70.8 (21.6) | 69.6 (20.9) | 59.6 (15.3) | 45.7 (7.6) | 33.4 (0.8) | 24.5 (−4.2) | 44.7 (7.0) |
| Daily mean °F (°C) | 18.0 (−7.8) | 18.6 (−7.4) | 24.2 (−4.3) | 29.4 (−1.4) | 39.0 (3.9) | 49.5 (9.7) | 58.9 (14.9) | 57.8 (14.3) | 48.5 (9.2) | 36.1 (2.3) | 25.1 (−3.8) | 18.1 (−7.7) | 35.3 (1.8) |
| Mean daily minimum °F (°C) | 11.3 (−11.5) | 9.9 (−12.3) | 15.7 (−9.1) | 19.8 (−6.8) | 29.4 (−1.4) | 39.2 (4.0) | 47.1 (8.4) | 46.0 (7.8) | 37.4 (3.0) | 26.4 (−3.1) | 16.9 (−8.4) | 11.7 (−11.3) | 25.9 (−3.4) |
| Average precipitation inches (mm) | 8.09 (205) | 6.87 (174) | 6.24 (158) | 4.85 (123) | 3.96 (101) | 1.89 (48) | 0.90 (23) | 1.10 (28) | 2.00 (51) | 3.67 (93) | 5.94 (151) | 6.92 (176) | 52.43 (1,331) |
Source: PRISM Climate Group

== See also ==
- List of mountains in Utah
