= Bear Lake State Park (Utah) =

State park in Rich County, Utah, United States

- IUCN category V (protected landscape/seascape)
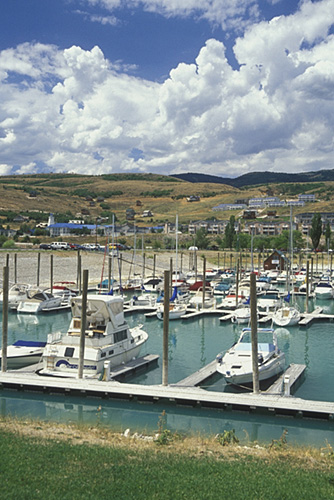
- Marina at Bear Lake State Park, May 2007

- Location within Utah Location within the United States
- Interactive map of Bear Lake State Park
- Location: Rich County, Utah, United States
- Coordinates: 41°50′44″N 111°20′44″W
- Area: 906 acres (367 ha)
- Elevation: 5,930 ft (1,810 m)
- Established: 1962
- Visitors: 664,224 (in 2025)
- Administrator: Utah State Park
- Website: Official website
- Utah State Parks

Bear Lake State Park is a state park of Utah, United States, along the shore of Bear Lake on the Idaho border. It offers three recreation areas: Rendezvous Beach, Bear Lake Marina, and East Side, which comprises several more segments. The park hosts annual events including the Mountain Man Rendezvous and Bear Lake Raspberry Days.

Recreational activities include waterskiing, swimming, scuba diving, and sailing in addition to year-round fishing for cutthroat trout, mackinaw trout, Bonneville cisco, and whitefish.

== Recreation areas ==
=== Rendezvous Beach ===
Rendezvous Beach is a 1.25-mile-long (2.01 km) recreation area with 220 campsites, restrooms, showers, and utility hookups. The beach is named for the historic rendezvous of fur trappers and Native Americans held here during the summers of 1827 and 1828. A thousand or more Native Americans and mountain men, including Jedediah Smith, attended these gatherings. There were so many campfires at the south end of the lake at these trading sessions that one observer called the area "a lighted city".

=== Bear Lake Marina ===
The Bear Lake Marina area is located about 8 miles north of Rendezvous on the west side of the lake, about 2 miles south of the Idaho border. The Bear Lake Marina area provides a sheltered harbor, an 80-foot (24 m)-wide concrete boat ramp, boat slips, 13 campsites, restrooms, and showers. There is also a visitor center, along with a business renting boats and selling fishing and boating supplies.41.96493°N 111.39922°W

=== East Side ===
The East Side portions of the park consists of six primitive camping sites and two concrete boat ramps. From the south end of the lake, about one mile up is and First Point 41.8760359°N 111.2954776°W with a boat ramp. Then 2 miles further begins the Cisco Beach area, which runs approximately three miles from South Eden campground at the south to Rainbow Cove on the north 41.9706725°N 111.2704647°W. And one mile further north, is the North Eden campground, at the Idaho border.
