= Garden, Utah =

- CDP
- Location in Rich County and the state of Utah

- Location of Utah in the United States
- Coordinates: 41°53′12″N 111°25′58″W
- Country: United States
- State: Utah
- County: Rich

Area
  - Total: 28.3 sq mi (73.3 km^{2})
  - Land: 28.3 sq mi (73.3 km^{2})
  - Water: 0 sq mi (0.0 km^{2})
- Elevation: 6,664 ft (2,031 m)

Population (2020)
  - Total: 240
  - Density: 2.8/sq mi (1.1/km^{2})
- Time zone: UTC-7 (Mountain (MST))
  - Summer (DST): UTC-6 (MDT)
- FIPS code: 49-27902
- GNIS feature ID: 2408276

Garden is a census-designated place (CDP) in Rich County, Utah, United States. The population was 240 at the 2020 census.

== Geography ==
According to the United States Census Bureau, the CDP has a total area of 28.3 square miles (73.3 km^{2}), of which 28.3 square miles (73.3 km^{2}) is land and 0.04 square mile (0.1 km^{2}) (0.07%) is water.

=== Climate ===
Climate data for Usu Doc Daniel, Utah, 2008–2020 normals: 8270ft (2521m)
| Month | Jan | Feb | Mar | Apr | May | Jun | Jul | Aug | Sep | Oct | Nov | Dec | Year |
|---|---|---|---|---|---|---|---|---|---|---|---|---|---|
| Record high °F (°C) | 52 (11) | 48 (9) | 56 (13) | 67 (19) | 73 (23) | 82 (28) | 83 (28) | 83 (28) | 81 (27) | 73 (23) | 56 (13) | 48 (9) | 83 (28) |
| Mean maximum °F (°C) | 39.1 (3.9) | 40.4 (4.7) | 50.2 (10.1) | 59.0 (15.0) | 66.9 (19.4) | 77.2 (25.1) | 81.1 (27.3) | 80.3 (26.8) | 74.4 (23.6) | 62.9 (17.2) | 50.4 (10.2) | 39.6 (4.2) | 81.8 (27.7) |
| Mean daily maximum °F (°C) | 27.9 (−2.3) | 29.1 (−1.6) | 37.6 (3.1) | 43.7 (6.5) | 52.2 (11.2) | 63.9 (17.7) | 73.5 (23.1) | 71.6 (22.0) | 62.0 (16.7) | 46.6 (8.1) | 35.1 (1.7) | 26.1 (−3.3) | 47.4 (8.6) |
| Daily mean °F (°C) | 21.7 (−5.7) | 21.9 (−5.6) | 29.1 (−1.6) | 34.0 (1.1) | 42.6 (5.9) | 53.0 (11.7) | 62.3 (16.8) | 60.5 (15.8) | 52.3 (11.3) | 38.9 (3.8) | 28.5 (−1.9) | 19.9 (−6.7) | 38.7 (3.7) |
| Mean daily minimum °F (°C) | 15.5 (−9.2) | 14.7 (−9.6) | 20.5 (−6.4) | 24.3 (−4.3) | 33.0 (0.6) | 42.1 (5.6) | 51.1 (10.6) | 49.5 (9.7) | 42.5 (5.8) | 31.1 (−0.5) | 21.9 (−5.6) | 13.8 (−10.1) | 30.0 (−1.1) |
| Mean minimum °F (°C) | −3.8 (−19.9) | −1.8 (−18.8) | 6.4 (−14.2) | 10.8 (−11.8) | 19.8 (−6.8) | 29.2 (−1.6) | 41.5 (5.3) | 39.8 (4.3) | 28.0 (−2.2) | 15.0 (−9.4) | 5.3 (−14.8) | −5.6 (−20.9) | −9.4 (−23.0) |
| Record low °F (°C) | −14 (−26) | −18 (−28) | 0 (−18) | 1 (−17) | 14 (−10) | 24 (−4) | 33 (1) | 32 (0) | 21 (−6) | −7 (−22) | −9 (−23) | −12 (−24) | −18 (−28) |
| Average precipitation inches (mm) | 6.11 (155) | 5.50 (140) | 4.58 (116) | 3.53 (90) | 3.57 (91) | 1.57 (40) | 0.65 (17) | 0.98 (25) | 2.04 (52) | 2.84 (72) | 3.92 (100) | 5.25 (133) | 40.54 (1,031) |
Source 1: XMACIS2
Source 2: NOAA (Precipitation)

== Demographics ==
Historical population
| Census | Pop. | Note | %± |
|---|---|---|---|
| 2000 | 83 | | — |
| 2010 | 181 | | 118.1% |
| 2020 | 240 | | 32.6% |

As of the census of 2000, there were 83 people, 37 households, and 27 families residing in the CDP. The population density was 2.9 people per square mile (1.1/km^{2}). There were 533 housing units at an average density of 18.8/sq mi (7.3/km^{2}). The racial makeup of the CDP was 100.00% White.

There were 37 households, out of which 27.0% had children under the age of 18 living with them, 59.5% were married couples living together, 8.1% had a female householder with no husband present, and 27.0% were non-families. 24.3% of all households were made up of individuals, and 8.1% had someone living alone who was 65 years of age or older. The average household size was 2.24 and the average family size was 2.67.

In the CDP, the population was spread out, with 22.9% under the age of 18, 2.4% from 18 to 24, 22.9% from 25 to 44, 30.1% from 45 to 64, and 21.7% who were 65 years of age or older. The median age was 48 years. For every 100 females, there were 102.4 males. For every 100 females age 18 and over, there were 106.5 males.

The median income for a household in the CDP was $37,188, and the median income for a family was $43,750. Males had a median income of $35,893 versus $38,750 for females. The per capita income for the CDP was $21,596. There were 7.4% of families and 8.3% of the population living below the poverty line, including 10.0% of under eighteens and 14.3% of those over 64.

== See also ==
- List of census-designated places in Utah
