= Tony Grove Lake =

Lake in the state of Utah, United States

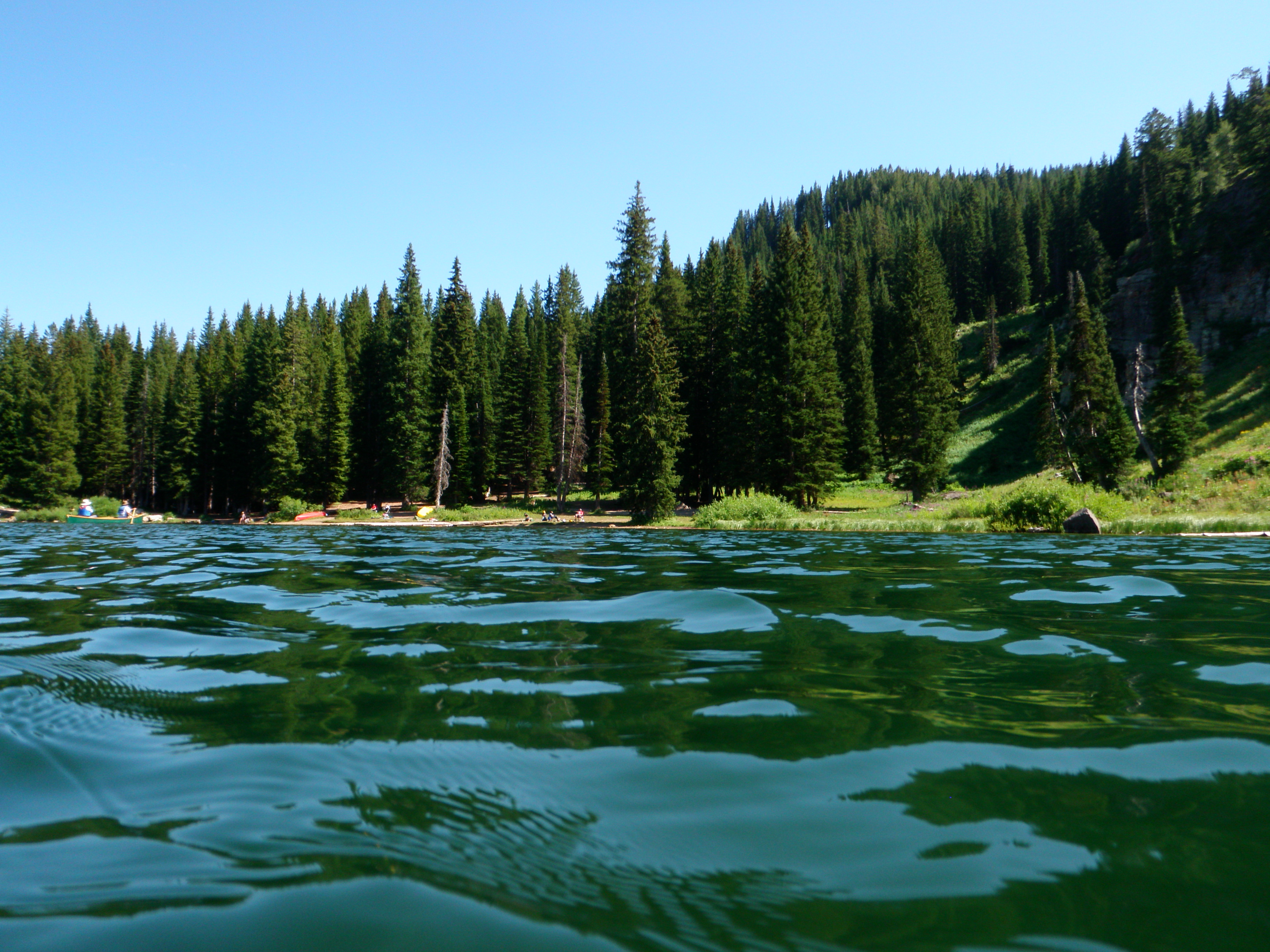
- Looking south from middle of lake toward the picnic area

- Location within Utah Location within the United States
- Location: Cache County, Utah
- Coordinates: 41°53′37″N 111°38′38″W
- Surface elevation: 8,048 ft (2,453 m)
- References: GNIS

Tony Grove Lake is a lake in Cache County, Utah. The Tony Grove Lake Campground is located on the southeast shore of the lake. The lake and campground are situated on the Logan Canyon Scenic Byway. A 5–6 mi (8.0–9.7 km) paved road climbs to a height of 8,048 feet (2,453 m) to reach Tony Grove Lake and the Mount Naomi Wilderness area.

A historic marker at the lake states that Tony Grove's name derived from its popularity with wealthy residents of Logan in the late 19th and early 20th centuries.

The Mt. Naomi Wilderness Area was designated in 1984, and covers 45,000 acres (180 km^{2}). This region embraces some of the most rugged and spectacular country in the Bear River Range. The area around this glacial lake explodes into wildflowers in the early summer.

Many trails throughout the area offer wildlife viewing. Access and parking for the White Pine Lake Trail, Coldwater Spring Trail, Naomi Peak Trail and High Creek Trail is located at the Tony Grove Lake parking lot.

== Gallery ==
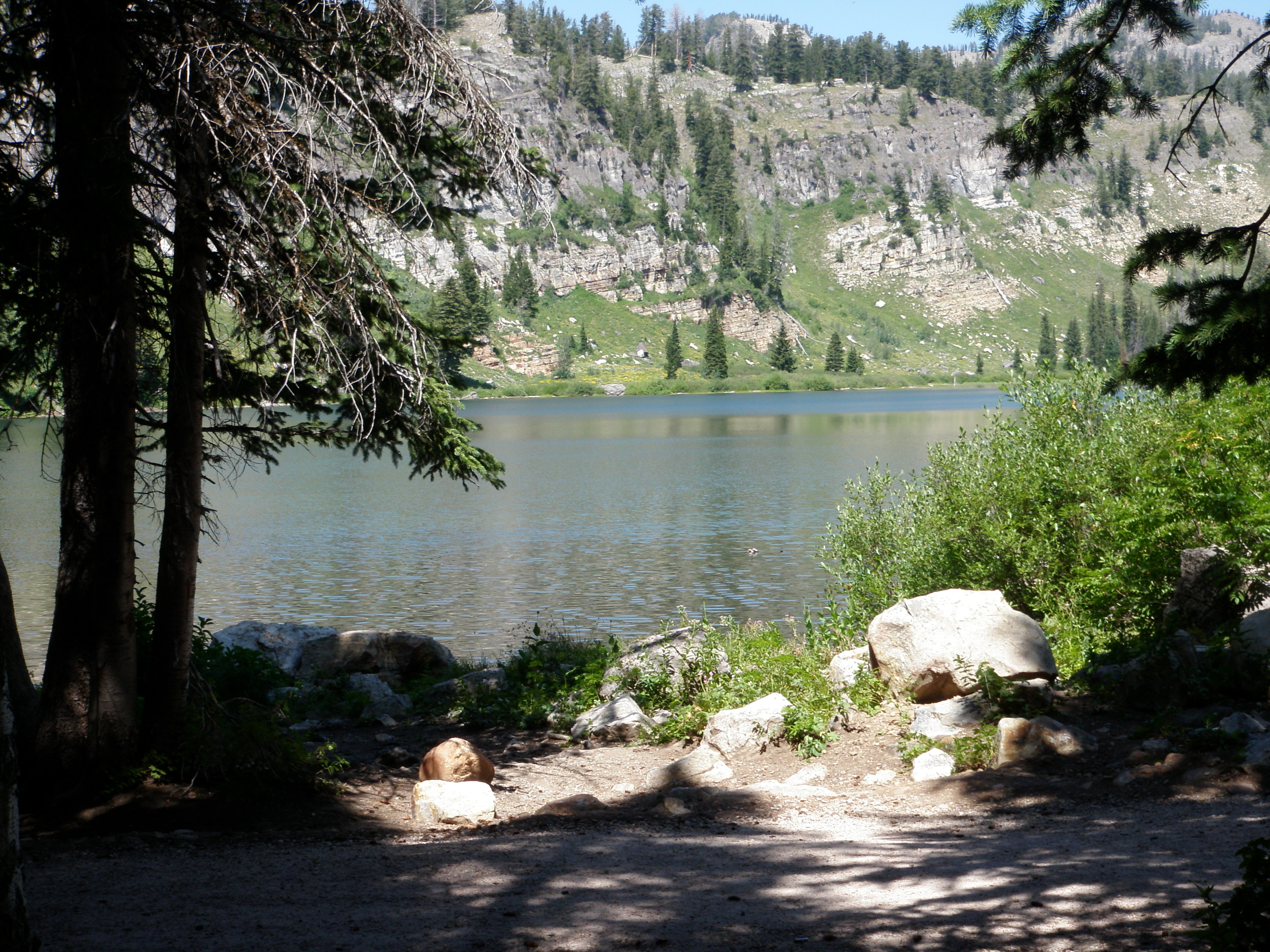
Northwest view

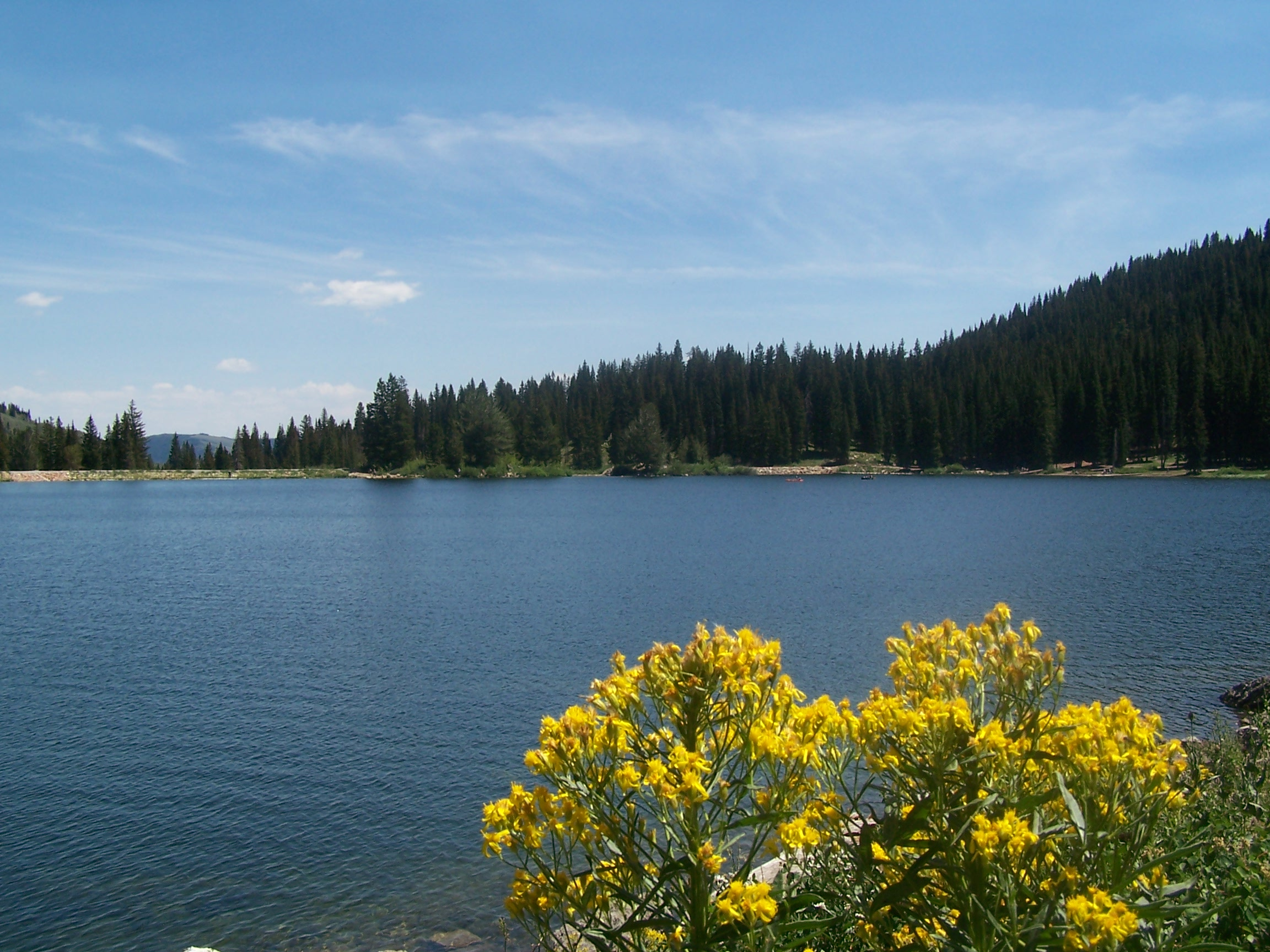
East view
