= Pickleville Playhouse =

Coordinates: 41°54′34″N 111°23′23″W

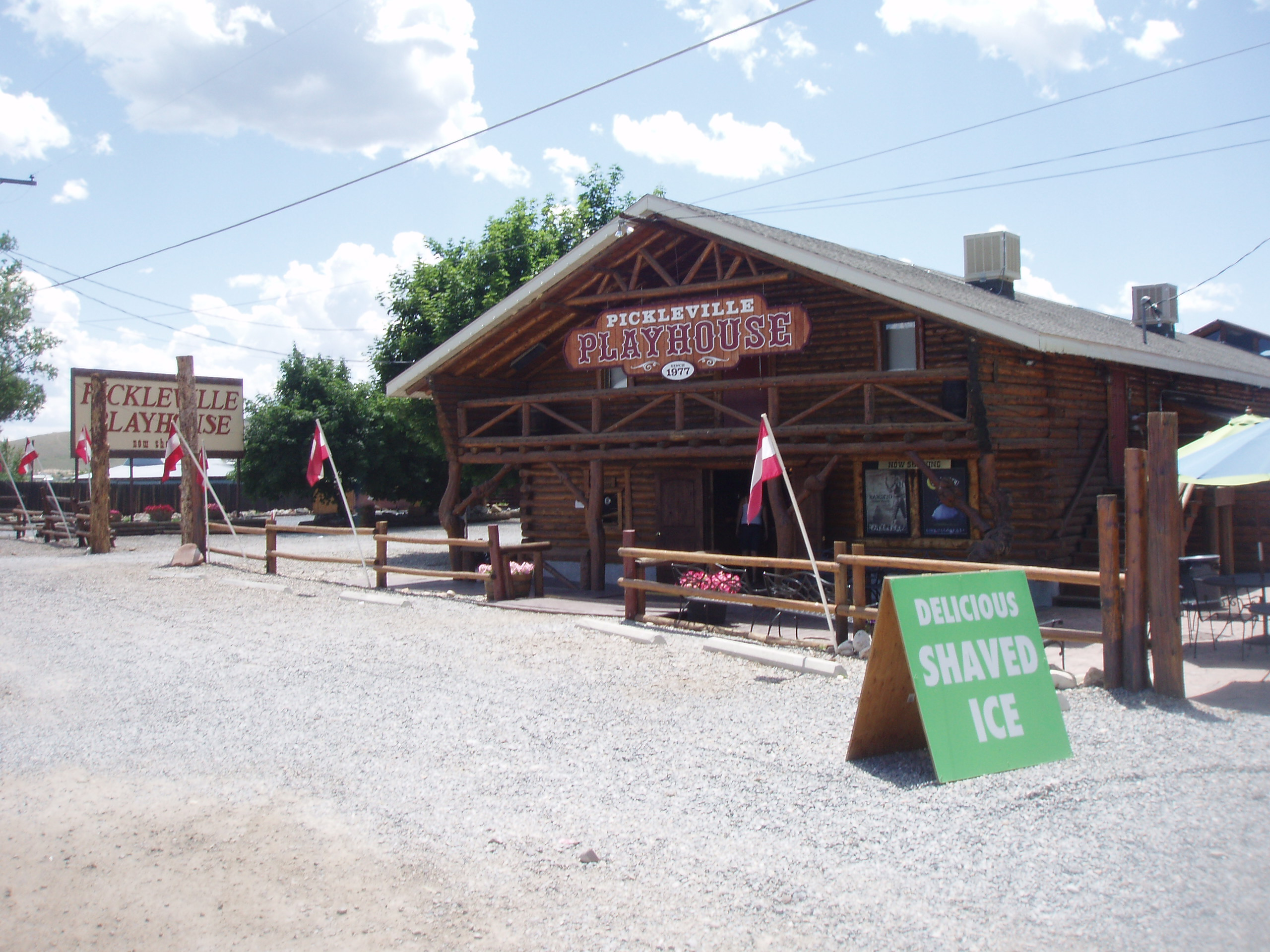
- Interactive map of Pickleville Playhouse
- Address: 2049 South Bear Lake Blvd; Garden City, Utah; USA
- Owner: Andrea Davis
- Capacity: 310
- Type: Proscenium

Construction
- Opened: 1977
- Years active: 34 years
- Architects: LeGrande and Betty Larsen

Website
- www.picklevilleplayhouse.com

The Pickleville Playhouse is a musical theater on the banks of Bear Lake in Garden City, Utah, United States.

== History ==
When the Larsens moved to Driggs, Idaho where LeGrande Larsen began his practice as a physician, they discovered an old melodrama theater, "Pierre's Playhouse", in nearby Victor, Idaho. After moving to Logan, Utah in 1976, the Larsens built their own melodrama theater.

LeGrande and his wife, Betty Larsen, founded the Playhouse with the aim to create a family-friendly theater.

The Pickleville Playhouse was named for the town in which it once resided, Pickelville. Shortly after the construction of the Playhouse, the town Pickelville was annexed as part of Garden City.

== Construction ==
Playhouse construction began in June 1977. Despite never having constructed a large building before, LeGrande and Betty Larsen, with the help of their six sons and one daughter, acquired as much help as they could from experts and did the rest on their own. They peeled white pine logs by hand and mixed concrete in wheelbarrows. The seats were brought from the old Capitol Theatre in Salt Lake City which was undergoing renovation at the time. Because the Larsens weren't allowed to collect the seats until the workers at the Capitol had gone home, the family drove two hours in the middle of the night to the theater in Salt Lake, loaded up as many chairs as would fit in a truck, returned to Bear Lake, and repeated the process until all 320 chairs were moved. The seats are still in use today.

The family built by day and rehearsed on stage at night. There was no place for the cast and crew to stay, so they spent nights in sleeping bags and tents. The Larsens had to work quickly as they were scheduled to open their first show in August, two-and-a-half months after construction began.

== Growth and expansion ==
Early audiences were meager. As the theater's reputation grew, however, so did the audiences. The Playhouse now performs for sold-out audiences from mid-June to early September with up to 13 shows per week. Pickleville has expanded its repertoire of summer melodramas to include favorite Broadway shows and in December, its sister company, Pickleville On Tour, takes to Logan and Salt Lake City, Utah, where they perform an original Pickleville Christmas production. You can often see Pickleville On Tour perform a springtime show as well.

== Management ==
The Larsens transferred ownership of the theater and its operations to their youngest child and only daughter, Andrea Larsen Davis. Andrea's oldest son, TJ Davis, eventually joined her as a full-time partner and writer for the Playhouse. The entire Davis family is involved in producing and supporting shows at Pickleville Playhouse. TJ Davis has taken his character "Juanito Banditio" touring through Utah, while Derek Davis writes and produces the productions at Pickleville Playhouse in Garden City.

== Juanito Bandito ==
The Playhouse has gained notability in recent years for the creation of a character, Juanito Bandito, an "unabashed, Spanglish-speaking, likeable crook". Both created and played by T.J. Davis, the self-proclaimed "baddest Spanish villain in history" appeared first in "Chuck Wagon's Wild West Showdown" in the summer of 2008 at the Pickleville Playhouse. The character became the subject of the next seven consecutive summers' shows including: "The Hanging of El Bandito" (2009), "Bandito Rides Again" (2010), and "Who Shot Juanito Bandito?" (2011), "Ready, Fire, Aim starring Juanito Bandito" all of which were written by T.J. Davis.

== Performances ==
In August 1977, the Playhouse performed its first melodrama, "The Faithful Footman". It performs two shows each summer, one melodrama, and one Broadway show.

Shows by Year
Year	Melodrama	Broadway show
1977	The Faithful Footman	--
1978–2001	(coming soon...)	(coming soon...)
2002	Tumbleweeds	Calamity Jane
2003	The Saloon Keeper's Daughter	Forever Plaid
2004	Chuck Wagon's Wild West Showdown	You're a Good Man, Charlie Brown
2005	Finding the Fickle Fortune	Seven Brides for Seven Brothers
2006	Tied to the Tracks	A Pirate's Life
2007	Little Shop of Horrors	Joseph and the Amazing Technicolor Dreamcoat
2008	Chuck Wagon's Wild West Showdown	Thoroughly Modern Millie
2009	The Hanging of El Bandito	Annie Get Your Gun
2010	Bandito Rides Again	Crazy for You
2011	Who Shot Juanito Bandito?	Joseph and the Amazing Technicolor Dreamcoat
2012	The hanging of el Bandito REIMAGINED	Forever Plaid
2013	Bandito Rides Again	Seven Brides for Seven Brothers
2014	Who Shot Juanito Bandito? REIMAGINED	Beauty and the Beast (musical)
2015	(Juanito Bandito) The One With the Monkey (previously A Town Called Danger)	The Drowsy Chaperone
2016	Ready, Fire! Aim	Hairspray
2017	Love and Death vs El Bandito	Shrek: The Musical
2018	Who Shot Juanito Bandito?	Tarzan: The Broadway Adventure
2019	Shootout at Shadow Mountain	The Addams Family: A Musical Comedy
2020	Finding The Fickle Fortune	N/A
2021	Becoming a Bona Fide Bad Guy	Peter Pan
2022	New Sheriff in Town	Beauty and the Beast
2023	Thick as Thieves	The Little Mermaid
2024	Welcome to Dangerville	Newsies
2025	Trouble in Hunky Dory	Joseph and the Amazing Technicolor Dreamcoat
