= Utah Lake sculpin =

Conservation status
- Extinct (IUCN 3.1)

Scientific classification
- Kingdom: Animalia
- Phylum: Chordata
- Class: Actinopterygii
- Order: Perciformes
- Suborder: Cottoidei
- Family: Cottidae
- Genus: Cottus
- Species: †C. echinatus

Binomial name
- †Cottus echinatus R. M. Bailey & C. E. Bond, 1963

Species of fish

The Utah Lake sculpin (Cottus echinatus) is an extinct species of freshwater ray-finned fish belonging to the family Cottidae, the typical sculpins. This species was endemic to Utah Lake, located in the north-central part of the U.S. state of Utah. The last collected specimen was taken in 1928, and the species is believed to have disappeared sometime during the 1930s, when a severe drought led to a rapid fall in water levels in the lake. This was followed by a cold winter that led to the lake freezing, which resulted in overcrowding for the remaining fish. This, along with decreased water quality from agricultural practices, has been identified as the likely cause for the Utah Lake sculpin's extinction.

The Utah Lake sculpin was a benthic species (bottom dwelling), invertebrates constituting its major source of food. It was one of two lake-dwelling sculpins native to Utah, the other being the Bear Lake sculpin.
