= Beirdneau Peak =

Mountain in the American state of Utah

Coordinates: 41°47′36″N 111°41′37″W

Beirdneau Peak is a mountain located in the Bear River Range of northern Utah in the United States. The mountain is roughly 8,900 feet (2,700 m) in height and a popular site for outdoor activities. It borders on Mount Logan and forms the walls of both Logan Canyon and Green Canyon.
