= Enoch Reese =

American politician

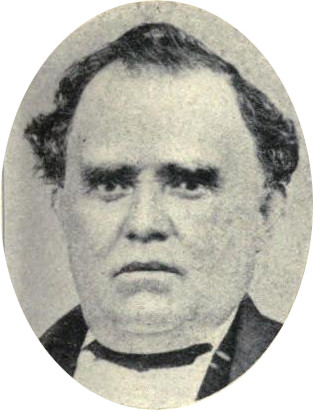
- Born: May 25, 1813
- Died: July 20, 1876 (aged 63)
- Known for: Early settler of Carson River valley, Member of Utah territorial legislature

Enoch Reese (May 25, 1813 – July 20, 1876) was an early leader in the Church of Jesus Christ of Latter-day Saints (LDS Church), a member of the Utah Territorial Legislature, and an early settler of Nevada.

Reese was serving as president of the Buffalo, New York branch of the LDS Church in 1843. In 1848 he was a captain of fifty in one of the Mormon pioneer companies.

In 1850, Reese staked out claims for land in Spanish Fork, Utah Territory. Enoch and his brother John Reese opened a store in Salt Lake City about 1850.

In 1851 Reese settled in the Carson Valley, then a part of Utah Territory, along with his brother John. They established a sawmill and gristmill called Mormon Station en route to the California mines, it being the first permanent nonnative settlement in present-day Nevada. From Carson County, he was elected to the Utah Territorial Legislature.

In 1857 Reese was in the hand-cart company of missionaries headed east from Salt Lake City bound for missions in Europe.

In the 1860s he was a member of the Utah Territorial Legislature from Salt Lake County. He also was a member of the Salt Lake City Council for a time.
