= Mount Naomi Wilderness =

Wilderness area in Utah, United States

- IUCN category Ib (wilderness area)
- Location within the United States
- Location: Cache County, Utah, USA
- Nearest city: Richmond, UT
- Coordinates: 41°52′54″N 111°42′18″W
- Area: 44,523 acres (180.18 km^{2})
- Established: 1984
- Governing body: U.S. Forest Service

Mount Naomi Wilderness is a 44,523-acre (180.18 km^{2}) wilderness area located within the Uinta-Wasatch-Cache National Forest in the U.S. state of Utah. It lies between the Logan River and the Utah-Idaho state line northeast of Logan, Utah.

== Topography ==
Mount Naomi Wilderness consists of wooded, mountainous terrain. The namesake of the Wilderness, Naomi Peak, is also its highest point at 9,980 feet (3,040 m). It stands near the eastern boundary of the wilderness area, while the western side is many deep canyons. The Wilderness contains several other peaks over 9,000 feet (2,700 m).

== Recreation ==
Common recreational activities in Mount Naomi Wilderness include hiking, camping, horseback riding, hunting, and wildlife watching. Tony Grove Lake and White Pine Lake, the latter accessible only by hiking, are popular destinations. In late July and August wildflowers grow in abundance.

== See also ==
- Wilderness Act
- National Wilderness Preservation System
- List of U.S. Wilderness Areas
