= Garden City, Utah =

Town in the state of Utah, United States

- Town
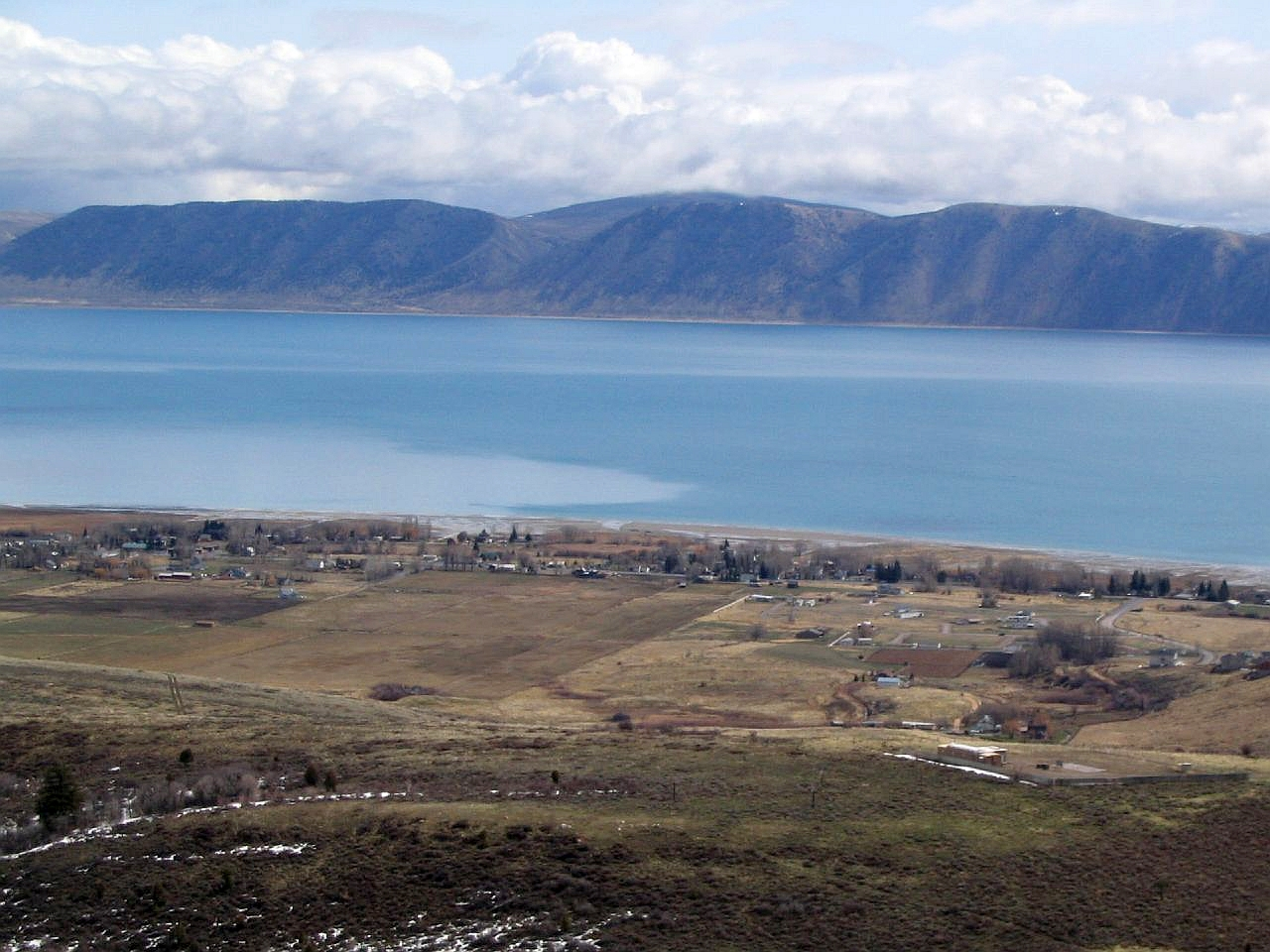
- Garden City and Bear Lake

- Location in Rich County and the state of Utah

- Location within the United States
- Coordinates: 41°55′18″N 111°23′35″W
- Country: United States
- State: Utah
- County: Rich
- Incorporated: 1934

Area
  - Total: 8.78 sq mi (22.74 km^{2})
  - Land: 8.78 sq mi (22.74 km^{2})
  - Water: 0 sq mi (0.00 km^{2})
- Elevation: 6,198 ft (1,889 m)

Population (2020)
  - Total: 602
  - Density: 70.3/sq mi (27.14/km^{2})
- Time zone: UTC-7 (Mountain (MST))
  - Summer (DST): UTC-6 (MDT)
- ZIP code: 84028
- Area code: 435
- FIPS code: 49-27930
- GNIS feature ID: 2412668

Garden City is a town in northwestern Rich County, Utah, United States. The population was 602 at the 2020 census. Garden City sits on the shores of Bear Lake and is a popular summer resort destination town, thus nicknamed the "Caribbean of the Rockies”.

== History ==
Garden City was first settled in 1877, and an LDS branch was formed there. Two years later the town had grown into a ward. In 1979, it merged with the neighboring town of Pickelville.

In 1903, Horatio Nelson Jackson and Sewall Crocker stopped in Garden City on the first automobile journey across the United States.

== Geography ==
According to the United States Census Bureau, the town has a total area of 4.5 square miles (11.7 km^{2}), all land.

== Demographics ==
Historical population
Census	Pop.	Note	%±
1880	161		—
1890	249		54.7%
1900	212		−14.9%
1910	326		53.8%
1920	337		3.4%
1930	379		12.5%
1940	261		−31.1%
1950	164		−37.2%
1960	168		2.4%
1970	134		−20.2%
1980	259		93.3%
1990	193		−25.5%
2000	357		85.0%
2010	562		57.4%
2020	602		7.1%
U.S. Decennial Census

As of the census of 2000, there were 357 people, 131 households, and 99 families residing in the town. The population density was 79.3 people per square mile (30.6/km^{2}). There were 881 housing units at an average density of 195.6 per square mile (75.6/km^{2}). The racial makeup of the town was 98.32% White, 0.28% Native American, 0.28% from other races, and 1.12% from two or more races. Hispanic or Latino of any race were 0.84% of the population.

There were 131 households, out of which 26.7% had children under 18 living with them, 69.5% were married couples living together, 4.6% had a female householder with no husband present, and 23.7% were non-families. 19.1% of all households were made up of individuals, and 8.4% had someone living alone who was 65 years of age or older. The average household size was 2.69, and the average family size was 3.10. There is a large number of vacation homes, the majority of which are rented out to large groups during the vacation season.

In the town, the population was spread out, with 24.9% under 18, 7.8% from 18 to 24, 20.4% from 25 to 44, 24.6% from 45 to 64, and 22.1% who were 65 years of age or older. The median age was 42 years. For every 100 females, there were 90.9 males. For every 100 females aged 18 and over, there were 92.8 males.

The median income for a household in the town was $40,750, and the median income for a family was $56,250. Males had a median income of $45,833 versus $35,000 for females. The per capita income for the town was $20,206. About 2.7% of families and 9.6% of the population were below the poverty line, including none of those under age 18 and 12.5% of those aged 65 or over.

=== Climate ===
Garden City has a humid continental climate with warm summers (Köppen Dfb).

Climate data for Bear Lake, Utah, 1991–2020 normals, extremes 1989–2020: 5928ft (1807m)
Month	Jan	Feb	Mar	Apr	May	Jun	Jul	Aug	Sep	Oct	Nov	Dec	Year
Record high °F (°C)	54 (12)	57 (14)	71 (22)	81 (27)	86 (30)	93 (34)	99 (37)	98 (37)	94 (34)	81 (27)	69 (21)	63 (17)	99 (37)
Mean maximum °F (°C)	45.6 (7.6)	49.0 (9.4)	57.6 (14.2)	70.7 (21.5)	77.1 (25.1)	86.5 (30.3)	91.8 (33.2)	90.5 (32.5)	85.6 (29.8)	73.9 (23.3)	60.2 (15.7)	49.2 (9.6)	92.5 (33.6)
Mean daily maximum °F (°C)	32.9 (0.5)	35.5 (1.9)	43.5 (6.4)	53.3 (11.8)	63.7 (17.6)	73.9 (23.3)	83.5 (28.6)	81.8 (27.7)	72.6 (22.6)	58.8 (14.9)	44.4 (6.9)	35.2 (1.8)	56.6 (13.7)
Daily mean °F (°C)	24.3 (−4.3)	26.4 (−3.1)	33.7 (0.9)	42.3 (5.7)	51.7 (10.9)	60.1 (15.6)	69.3 (20.7)	67.9 (19.9)	59.0 (15.0)	46.7 (8.2)	35.0 (1.7)	27.1 (−2.7)	45.3 (7.4)
Mean daily minimum °F (°C)	15.8 (−9.0)	17.4 (−8.1)	23.8 (−4.6)	31.3 (−0.4)	39.7 (4.3)	46.3 (7.9)	55.0 (12.8)	54.0 (12.2)	45.4 (7.4)	34.5 (1.4)	25.7 (−3.5)	19.1 (−7.2)	34.0 (1.1)
Mean minimum °F (°C)	3.0 (−16.1)	1.8 (−16.8)	9.8 (−12.3)	19.4 (−7.0)	28.0 (−2.2)	34.7 (1.5)	45.2 (7.3)	43.9 (6.6)	33.0 (0.6)	22.4 (−5.3)	11.1 (−11.6)	4.0 (−15.6)	−2.4 (−19.1)
Record low °F (°C)	−15 (−26)	−14 (−26)	−7 (−22)	8 (−13)	19 (−7)	28 (−2)	33 (1)	32 (0)	24 (−4)	2 (−17)	0 (−18)	−25 (−32)	−25 (−32)
Average precipitation inches (mm)	1.59 (40)	1.28 (33)	1.24 (31)	1.64 (42)	2.08 (53)	1.28 (33)	0.64 (16)	0.93 (24)	1.33 (34)	1.43 (36)	1.41 (36)	1.68 (43)	16.53 (421)
Average snowfall inches (cm)	11.0 (28)	12.1 (31)	3.7 (9.4)	1.9 (4.8)	0.5 (1.3)	0.0 (0.0)	0.0 (0.0)	0.0 (0.0)	0.0 (0.0)	0.3 (0.76)	7.0 (18)	7.5 (19)	44 (112.26)
Source 1: NOAA
Source 2: XMACIS2 (1991–2006 snowfall, records & monthly max/mins)

== See also ==
- List of cities and towns in Utah
- Pickelville, a former town that merged with Garden City
- Pickleville Playhouse, a musical theater in Garden City
