= Bear Lake (Idaho–Utah) =

Lake on the Utah-Idaho border in the United States

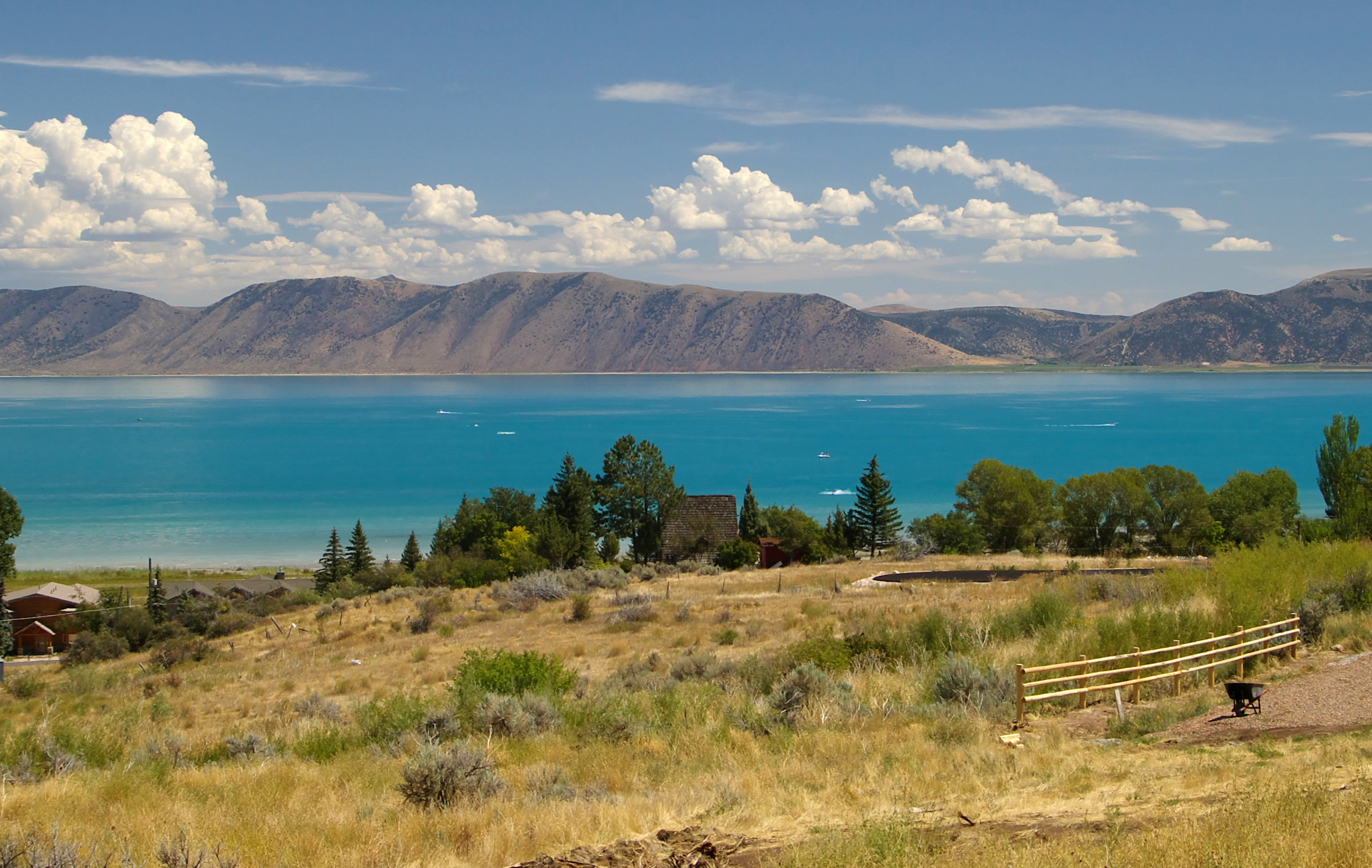
- The lake's intense turquoise color is due to the presence of suspended limestone

- Location within Utah Location within Idaho Location within the United States

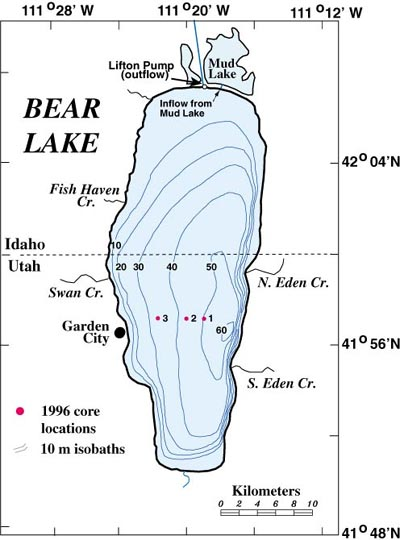
- Bathymetric chart
- Location: Bear Lake County, Idaho; Rich County, Utah, U.S.
- Coordinates: 42°00′N 111°20′W
- Primary inflows: Bear River diversion Creeks: Fish Haven, North Eden, South Eden, Swan Creek, St. Charles
- Primary outflows: Bear Lake Outlet Canal
- Catchment area: 5,862,957 acres (23,727 km^{2})
- Basin countries: United States
- Max. length: 18.3 mi (29.5 km)
- Max. width: 7.1 mi (11.4 km)
- Surface area: 109 sq mi (280 km^{2})
- Average depth: 94 ft (29 m)
- Max. depth: 208 ft (63 m)
- Water volume: 6,500,000 acre⋅ft (8.02 km^{3})
- Residence time: 19.6 years
- Shore length^{1}: 48 mi (77 km)
- Surface elevation: 5,924 ft (1,806 m)
- Settlements: Garden City, Utah, Laketown, Utah, Fish Haven, Idaho
- ^{1} Shore length is not a well-defined measure.

Bear Lake is a natural freshwater lake on the Idaho–Utah border in the Western United States. About 109 square miles (280 km^{2}) in size, it is split about equally between the two states; its Utah portion comprises the second-largest natural freshwater lake in Utah, after Utah Lake. The lake has been called the "Caribbean of the Rockies" for its unique turquoise-blue color, which is due to the refraction of calcium carbonate (limestone) deposits suspended in the lake. Its water properties have led to the evolution of several unique species of fauna that occur only within the lake. Bear Lake is at least 250,000 years old and could be several million years old. It was formed by fault subsidence that continues today, slowly deepening the lake along the eastern side. In 1911 the majority of the flow of the Bear River was diverted into Bear Lake via Mud Lake and a canal from Stewart Dam, ending 11,000 years of separation between the lake and that river system.

Today the lake is a popular destination for tourists and sports enthusiasts, and the surrounding valley has gained a reputation for having high-quality raspberries.

== History ==
The first known inhabitants of the Bear Lake Valley were Shoshone tribes, but the area was known to many Native Americans. The first record of Europeans seeing the lake is from 1818 when French-Canadian trappers working for the North West Company followed the Bear River upstream to the valley.

Originally named "Black Bear Lake" by Donald McKenzie, an explorer for the North West Fur Company who explored the lake in 1819, the name was later shortened to Bear Lake. Following his exploration of the lake, McKenzie held what is known to be the largest rendezvous of Native Americans to take place in the Rocky Mountains. Nearly 10,000 American Indians from various tribes camped along 7 miles of Bear Lake's north shore, trading with McKenzie and his trapping company.

The south end of the lake, in the area of modern-day Laketown, was also the location of two of the annual Rocky Mountain Rendezvous in the summers of 1827 and 1828. Mountain men, including Jedediah Smith and Jim Bridger, gathered at this location, along with trade goods suppliers and American Indians from several different tribes. The mountain men and Indians sold their furs in exchange for various store goods and supplies, and several weeks were spent reveling in assorted amusements and liquor.

Smith's arrival in June 1827 was especially historic, as it marked the completion of the first ever overland round-trip to California from the United States. He wrote in his journal: "My arrival caused a considerable bustle in camp for myself and party had been given up as lost."

Although the lake lies relatively near the Oregon Trail, which runs north and east of the lake, and was traveled by many pioneers between 1836 and the 1850s, it seems none of them went south enough to view the lake. It was not until 1863 that Mormon pioneers led by Charles C. Rich settled in the Bear Lake Valley, but they made an agreement with Native Americans, which left most of the Utah portion of the valley in Indian possession. Members of The Church of Jesus Christ of Latter-day Saints gradually moved south and established the villages of Garden City, Pickelville, and Laketown, each along the lake's shore.

In 1911 a diversion was constructed at Wardboro, Idaho that redirected the majority of the flow of the Bear River into Bear Lake via Mud Lake. Water then exits Bear Lake via an outlet canal to rejoin the Bear River. This allows the upper 21 feet of Bear Lake to act as a reservoir for the Bear River, storing spring runoff for irrigation later in the year. Before the construction of this connection, Bear Lake had been isolated from the Bear River for 11,000 years, though Bear River has connected to Bear Lake naturally several times over the 250,000-year existence of the Lake.

In later years, Bear Lake became a resort and recreation area, with many developers selling lake shore and mountain view lots. The beaches of Lakota and Ideal were given to private development in the 1970s, including the Blue Water and Sweetwater developments. The State of Utah bought the far southeast beach for use as a state park, and the state also operates a marina on the lake's west side.

== Geographic features ==
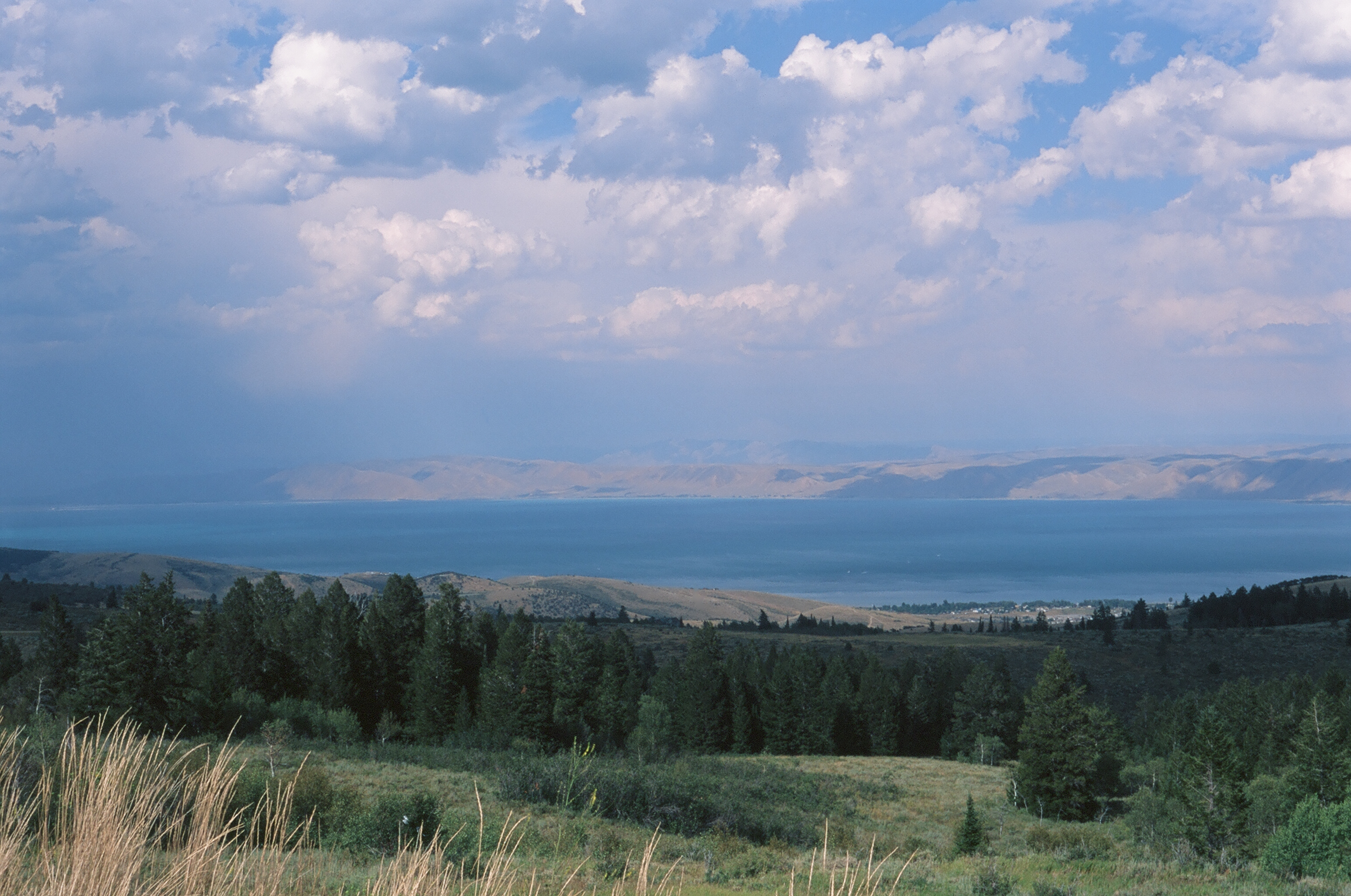
Bear Lake on the Utah side from the lookout on US Highway 89

Formed in a half graben valley straddling the Idaho-Utah border, the lake has an approximate area of 109 square miles (280 km^{2}) and sits at an elevation of 5,924 feet (1,806 m) along the northeast side of the Wasatch Range and the east side of the Bear River Mountains.

The lake and surrounding areas are popular summer tourist destinations. The lake has many marinas, beaches, and two tourist towns in Utah: Garden City and Laketown. It also has two state parks, each named Bear Lake State Park: one in Idaho and one in Utah. The Utah state park includes a one-half-mile-long Rendezvous Beach at the south end of the lake, the location of the 1827 and 1828 rendezvous, and a three-mile-long Cisco Beach on the east side, plus the additional campground, marina, and boat ramp areas. The Idaho state park includes north and an east unit, each with a one-mile-long beach. Bear Lake National Wildlife Refuge extends up from the north end of the lake.

=== Climate ===
Climate data for Bear Lake State Park, Utah, 1991–2020 normals, 1989-2020 extremes: 5928ft (1807m)
| Month | Jan | Feb | Mar | Apr | May | Jun | Jul | Aug | Sep | Oct | Nov | Dec | Year |
|---|---|---|---|---|---|---|---|---|---|---|---|---|---|
| Record high °F (°C) | 54 (12) | 57 (14) | 71 (22) | 81 (27) | 86 (30) | 93 (34) | 99 (37) | 98 (37) | 94 (34) | 81 (27) | 69 (21) | 63 (17) | 99 (37) |
| Mean maximum °F (°C) | 45.6 (7.6) | 49.0 (9.4) | 57.6 (14.2) | 70.7 (21.5) | 77.1 (25.1) | 86.5 (30.3) | 91.8 (33.2) | 90.5 (32.5) | 85.6 (29.8) | 73.9 (23.3) | 60.2 (15.7) | 49.2 (9.6) | 92.5 (33.6) |
| Mean daily maximum °F (°C) | 32.9 (0.5) | 35.5 (1.9) | 43.5 (6.4) | 53.3 (11.8) | 63.7 (17.6) | 73.9 (23.3) | 83.5 (28.6) | 81.8 (27.7) | 72.6 (22.6) | 58.8 (14.9) | 44.4 (6.9) | 35.2 (1.8) | 56.6 (13.7) |
| Daily mean °F (°C) | 24.3 (−4.3) | 26.4 (−3.1) | 33.7 (0.9) | 42.3 (5.7) | 51.7 (10.9) | 60.1 (15.6) | 69.3 (20.7) | 67.9 (19.9) | 59.0 (15.0) | 46.7 (8.2) | 35.0 (1.7) | 27.1 (−2.7) | 45.3 (7.4) |
| Mean daily minimum °F (°C) | 15.8 (−9.0) | 17.4 (−8.1) | 23.8 (−4.6) | 31.3 (−0.4) | 39.7 (4.3) | 46.3 (7.9) | 55.0 (12.8) | 54.0 (12.2) | 45.4 (7.4) | 34.5 (1.4) | 25.7 (−3.5) | 19.1 (−7.2) | 34.0 (1.1) |
| Mean minimum °F (°C) | 3.0 (−16.1) | 1.8 (−16.8) | 9.8 (−12.3) | 19.4 (−7.0) | 28.0 (−2.2) | 34.7 (1.5) | 45.2 (7.3) | 43.9 (6.6) | 33.0 (0.6) | 22.4 (−5.3) | 11.1 (−11.6) | 4.0 (−15.6) | −2.4 (−19.1) |
| Record low °F (°C) | −15 (−26) | −14 (−26) | −7 (−22) | 8 (−13) | 19 (−7) | 28 (−2) | 33 (1) | 32 (0) | 24 (−4) | 2 (−17) | 0 (−18) | −25 (−32) | −25 (−32) |
| Average precipitation inches (mm) | 1.59 (40) | 1.28 (33) | 1.24 (31) | 1.64 (42) | 2.08 (53) | 1.28 (33) | 0.64 (16) | 0.93 (24) | 1.33 (34) | 1.43 (36) | 1.41 (36) | 1.68 (43) | 16.53 (421) |
| Average snowfall inches (cm) | 11.0 (28) | 12.1 (31) | 3.7 (9.4) | 1.9 (4.8) | 0.5 (1.3) | 0.0 (0.0) | 0.0 (0.0) | 0.0 (0.0) | 0.0 (0.0) | 0.3 (0.76) | 7.0 (18) | 7.5 (19) | 44 (112.26) |
Source 1: NOAA
Source 2: XMACIS2 (1991-2006 snowfall, records & monthly max/mins)

== Hydrology ==
For the majority of the 220,000-year sediment core record, the Bear River did flow directly into Bear Lake. The diversion of Bear River into Bear Lake in 1911 represented a return to a previously experienced hydrological configuration. Paleoclimate research has shown that over the last 2,500 years there were multiple 60-foot (18.3 m) water level reductions in the lake with a maximum depth of 200 feet (61 m), which is much greater than the elevation reductions experienced since 1911.

The Bear River was (re)diverted into Bear Lake in 1911 so it could be used as a reservoir. Water enters Bear Lake by gravity, but is pumped out at the Lifton Pumping Station. Initially Bear Lake had an active storage range of 4 feet (1.2 m). In 1917 the Lifton Pumping Station was completed which allowed a 21.65-foot (6.6 m) elevation fluctuation, making 1.4 million acre-feet (1.73 km^{3}) of active storage available. The total lake volume is 7.1 million acre-feet (8.76 km^{3}) when full. Initially, the reservoir portion of the lake was used for both downstream power generation and irrigation in Idaho and Utah, but after the 1930s drought when power generation contributed to low lake levels, power generation became secondary to irrigation and flood control releases. Bear Lake is the largest reservoir in the Bear River basin and it is notable that there are no U.S. Bureau of Reclamation or U.S. Army Corps of Engineers dams on the mainstem of the Bear River. The privately owned hydroelectric plants downstream of Bear Lake are regulated by the Federal Energy Regulatory Commission but the water management operations at Bear Lake are not. The Bear River Compact and other legal agreements guide Bear Lake water management operations.

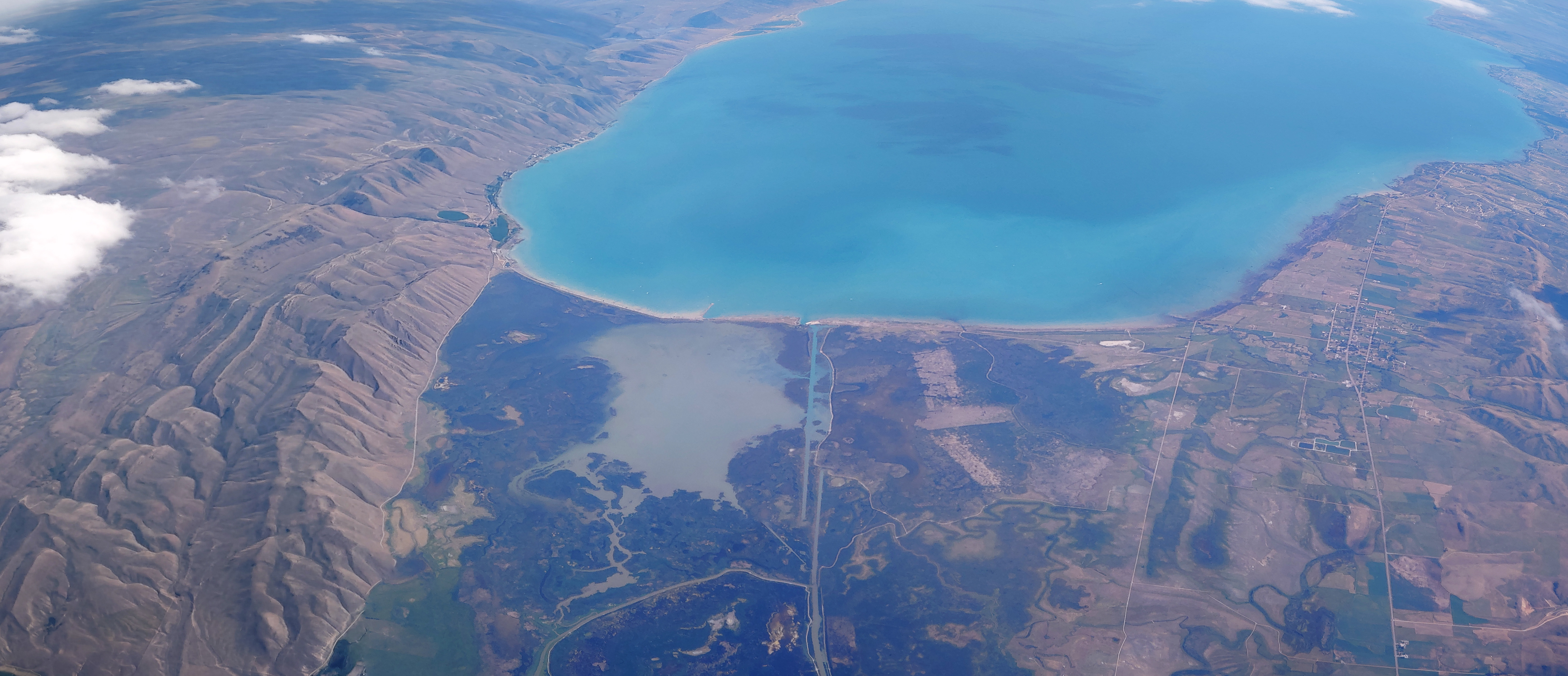
Aerial view from the north, including Mud Lake and the outlet canal

There is a natural berm between Bear Lake and the wetlands to the north. There was a small natural opening through the berm that allowed the excess inflow to Bear Lake to flow downstream to the Bear River. However, precipitation and evaporation are nearly balanced and the outflow was reportedly never very large. A 20-foot (6.1 m) high diversion dam completed in 1913 called Stewart Dam diverts the Bear River into the Bear Lake National Wildlife Refuge through the 6.5-mile-long (10.5 km) Rainbow Inlet Canal where the most prominent hydrologic feature is the open water area called Mud Lake. There is a low 1.5-mile-long (2.4 km) low earthen berm dam called the Paris Dike at the north end of the U.S Fish and Wildlife Service Bear Lake National Wildlife Refuge which was completed in December 1910 and allowed Bear River water to be stored in Bear Lake by increasing the water level in Mud Lake enough to flow water by gravity into Bear Lake. The water from the Bear River flows through a gated inlet structure through the natural berm one mile east of Lifton called the Inlet Causeway. Water stored in Bear Lake is then pumped out by the Lifton Pumping Plant back into Mud Lake. The water flows down the 14-mile-long (22.5 km) Bear Lake Outlet Canal through a headgate structure on the Paris Dike that controls the flow rate back to the Bear River.

There is a large difference in maximum depth between the shallow Mud Lake with a 10-foot elevation range and the very deep Bear Lake with a 21.65-foot (6.6 m) elevation reservoir range and a 200-foot (61 m) maximum depth. The elevations of Mud Lake are typically held within a 1-foot band. On Bear Lake, the March 31st target elevations vary more widely: 5,916.0 to 5,920.0 feet with a default value in the middle of the range at 5,918.0 feet (Utah Power & Light or UP&L Datum for all elevations, the local elevation datum in use for lake levels). The elevations of Bear Lake have varied over the full 21.65-foot (6.6 m) elevation range since 1917 highlighting the fact that due to the large volume of the reservoir and the relatively low inflow, there are decade-long periods when the lake elevation is less than its target elevation range. Elevations rise above the target range when storing water for downstream flood control and then releases are made to lower the water level to the target range by March 31st in order to be ready for the next spring runoff period. The highest annual inflows occurred in the 1980s but the two largest elevation increases occurred in 2011 and 2017 when the low starting elevation allowed over 11-foot (3.3 m) increases in elevation in both of these years.

In dry years, irrigation releases draw down the lake below the target range when water is only released for irrigation. The historic low occurred in 1936 at 5,902 feet, but was nearly matched in 2004 at 5,903.09 feet. While these over 20-foot (6.1 m) water level changes are large, over the past 2,500 years, the water level naturally dropped 60 feet (18.3 m) multiple times when evaporation exceeded inflow as indicated in sediment core records.

== Native and naturalized animals ==
Bear Lake has a high rate of endemism (native species not naturally found anywhere else). Several species evolved in the lake's waters, but many went extinct after the diversion of the Bear River into the lake. Surviving known endemic species of fish include the Bear Lake strain of the Bonneville cutthroat trout, Bonneville cisco, Bonneville whitefish, Bear Lake whitefish, and Bear Lake sculpin. There have been attempts to transplant these species to other areas without success, with the exception of the Bear Lake Cutthroat Trout strain. This trout has flourished in other large bodies of cool water, including the Strawberry and Scofield reservoirs.

"The Bonneville cisco eat only small aquatic invertebrates or zooplankton. They are eaten by larger fish in the lake including whitefish, Bonneville Cutthroat Trout, and introduced lake trout." Although several fish species have been introduced into the lake, those native species which survived the Bear River diversion have continued to thrive under careful management.

Water from the lake is used for irrigation in the nearby Bear Valley in southeast Idaho and for recreational fishing. The lake drains via the Bear River Outlet, completed in 1915, into the Bear River which eventually flows into the northeast portion of Great Salt Lake.

== Raspberry cultivation ==
Bear Lake has become famous for the surrounding valley's crops of raspberries and for the annual Raspberry Days festival held in Garden City to celebrate the harvest of raspberries, generally during the first week of August. This event is said to bring thousands of people from all over the world and features rodeos, parades, fireworks, dances, a craft fair, "Miss Berry Princess contest", raspberry recipe cookoff, a talent show, fun run and concerts.

A majority of the originally introduced Bear Lake Raspberry plants were infected with a fungal virus during 2001 called the "raspberry bushy dwarf virus". Fewer than five acres survived. The epidemic resulted in most of the large berry businesses in Garden City being wiped out. Some crop acreage was replaced by newly introduced virus-resistant plants. Although some varieties of raspberries are resistant to the virus, none produce fruit as succulent and sweet as the previously cultivated plants. The raspberry business has since been redeveloped, and raspberries are again thriving, mostly in the southern end of the valley.

== Recreation ==
One of the main reasons Bear Lake has become a popular vacation destination is due to the high amount of recreational activities and attractions that are available throughout the year. In the summertime, swimming, water-skiing, jet-skiing, boating, and sailing draw people to the water. Tourists also pass the time exploring the local caves or golf courses or taking mountain trails on foot, bike, ATV, or horseback. In the cooler months, hunting, snow skiing, snowmobiling, or ice fishing are common attractions. Many people try a "famous raspberry shake" at one of the local restaurants, or see a play at the Pickleville Playhouse.

== See also ==
- Bear Lake National Wildlife Refuge
- Bear Lake Monster, a legend
