= Charles C. Rich =

American Mormon pioneer and apostle (1809–1883)

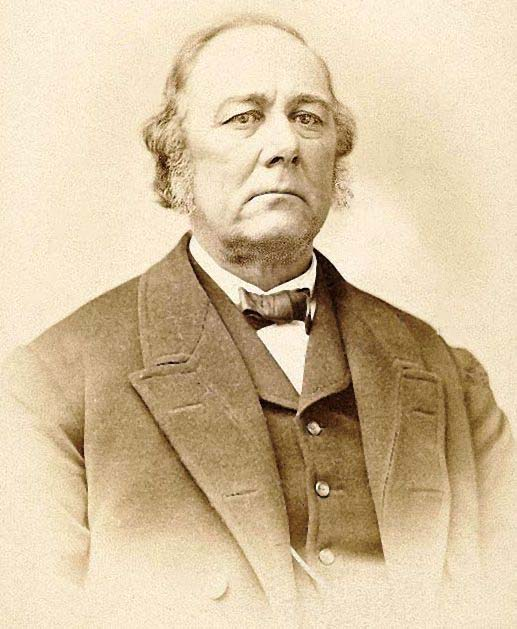

Quorum of the Twelve Apostles
- February 12, 1849 – November 17, 1883
- Called by: Brigham Young

LDS Church Apostle
- February 12, 1849 – November 17, 1883
- Called by: Brigham Young
- Reason: Reorganization of First Presidency, Lorenzo Snow, Erastus Snow, and Franklin D. Richards were ordained on the same day to fill four vacancies in the Quorum of the Twelve Apostles.
- Reorganization at end of term: John W. Taylor ordained

Personal details
- Born: Charles Coulson Rich; August 21, 1809; Campbell County, Kentucky, United States
- Died: November 17, 1883 (aged 74); Paris, Idaho Territory, United States
- Resting place: Paris Cemetery; 42.2131°N 111.4075°W
- Spouse(s): Sarah D. Pea; Eliza Ann Graves; Sarah J. Peck; Harriet Sargent; Mary A. Phelps; Emeline Grover
- Children: 51, including: Joseph C. Rich
- Parents: Joseph and Nancy Rich
- Signature

Charles Coulson Rich (August 21, 1809 – November 17, 1883) was an early leader in the Latter Day Saint movement. He led one of the first groups of Mormon pioneers west from Illinois under the leadership of Brigham Young after Joseph Smith's murder.

Rich was chosen and served as an apostle of the Church of Jesus Christ of Latter-day Saints (LDS Church) under Brigham Young after the Church settled in Utah Territory. President Young asked Rich to open up San Bernardino, California, for settlement in 1850, and Bear Lake Valley, located in Utah and Idaho, in 1863. Rich founded many communities in Bear Lake Valley, including Paris, Montpelier, Fish Haven, Ovid, Georgetown, St. Charles, Bloomington, Bennington, Wardboro, Dingle, Glencoe and Pegram in Idaho, and Garden City, Meadowville, and Laketown in Utah.

== Biography ==
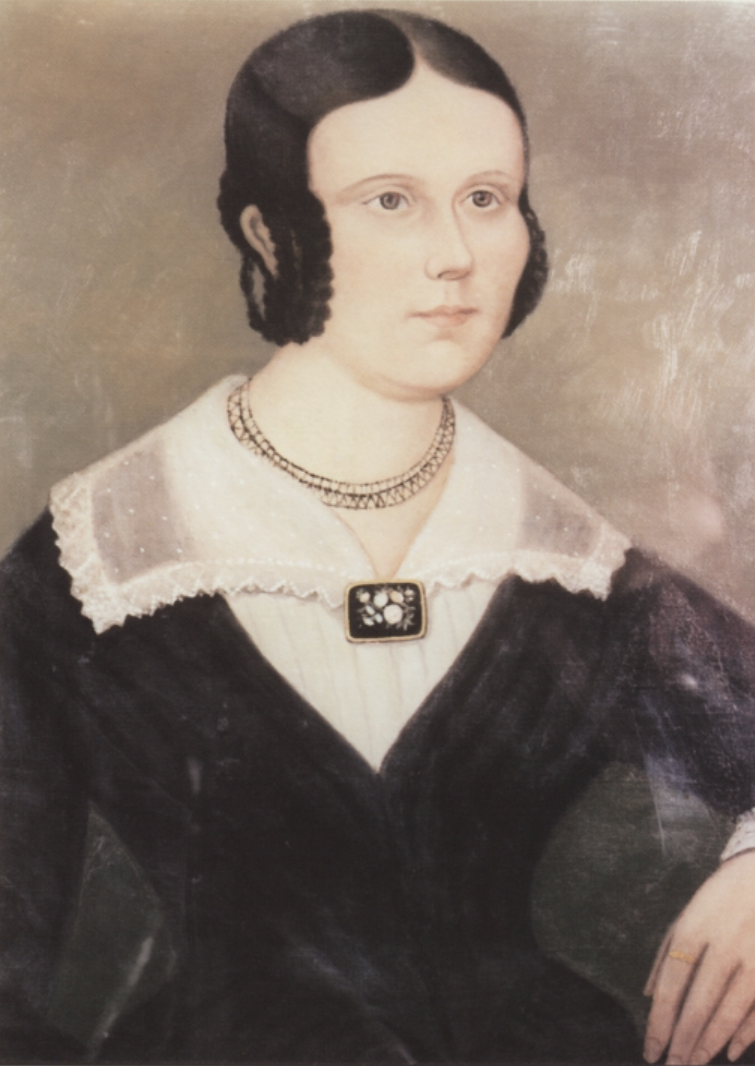
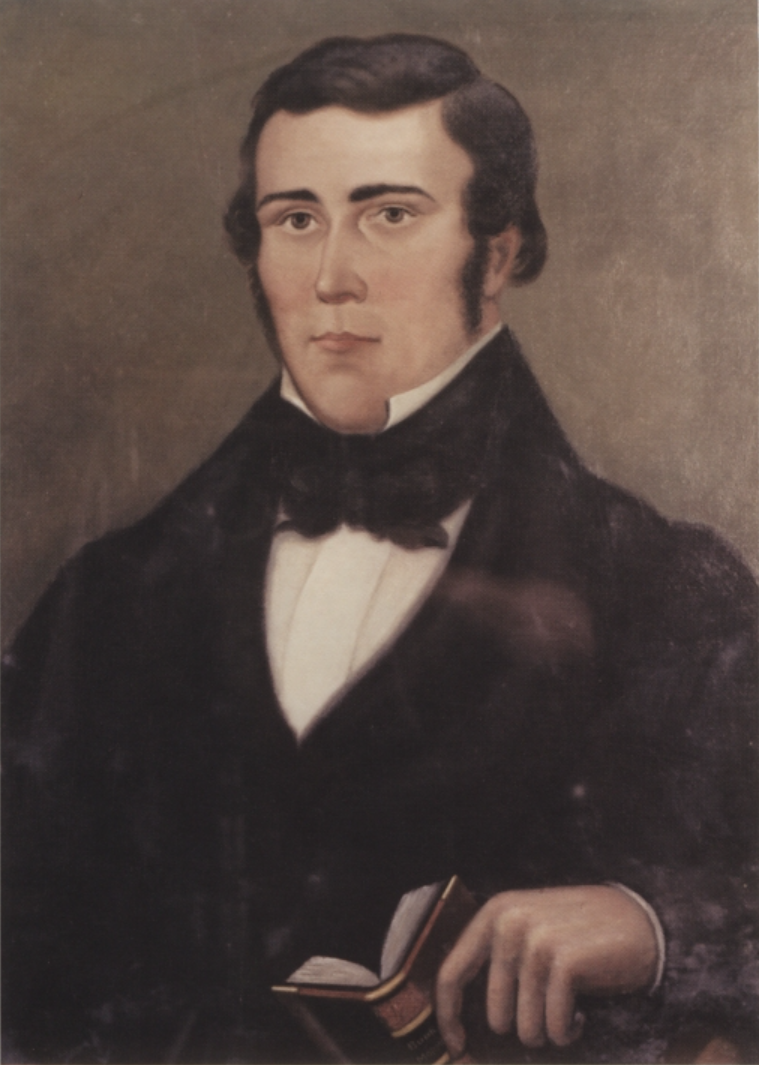
Portraits of Rich and his wife Sarah de Arman Pea ca 1842. These portraits hung in the Celestial Room of the Nauvoo Temple

=== Personal life ===
Rich was born in on August 21, 1809, in Campbell County, Kentucky, to Joseph Rich and Nancy O'Neal. Rich was baptized into the early Latter Day Saint church on April 1, 1832, after having been taught by Lyman Wight in 1831.

In 1838, Rich married Sarah D. Pea, whom he had previously proposed to by letter, the two never having met. Rich followed the church's principle of plural marriage, taking six wives and fathering a total of 51 children.

In 1863, Rich led a party of early Mormons to colonize parts of southeastern Idaho, which at the time was thought to be part of Utah Territory. The communities of Paris and Geneva, Idaho, as well as some other neighboring towns, were under his direction.

Rich had six slaves.

=== Church leadership ===
Rich was a leader in Caldwell County, Missouri, and fought in the Battle of Crooked River. It was recorded that, during the battle, Rich "dropped his sword ... and administered to wounded Apostle David W. Patten, then assuming command and winning the battle." Rich was also reported to have been shot "while carrying a flag of truce" around Far West, Missouri.

His log house is the only structure from the Mormon period in 1836–38 in Caldwell County to have survived to this day. After the expulsion of the Latter Day Saints from Missouri, Rich settled in Nauvoo, Illinois, where he was made an original member of the Council of Fifty. He also served as a member of the Nauvoo High Council, and as Brigadier-General in the Nauvoo Legion.

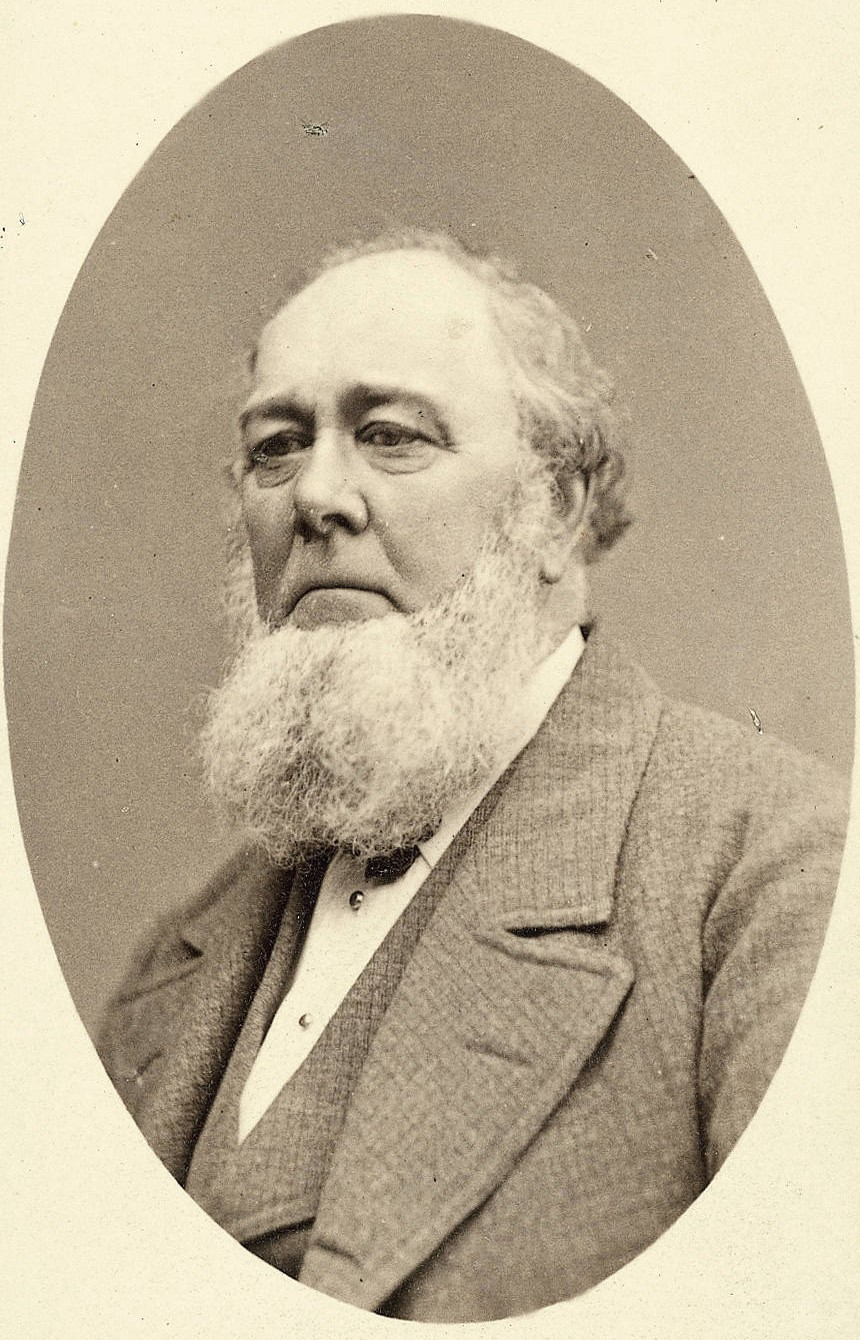
Charles C. Rich in 1880

After the death of Joseph Smith, Rich followed the leadership of Brigham Young and the surviving Quorum of the Twelve Apostles. He and his family migrated to what became Utah with the main body of the church in 1847, leading a pioneer company that arrived October of that year. When Young and the other apostles returned that winter to Winter Quarters, Nebraska, Rich served as a counselor to John Smith, who presided over the early pioneers in the Salt Lake Valley. In October 1848, Rich was made the president of the Salt Lake Stake.

Brigham Young appointed Rich a member of the Quorum of the Twelve Apostles on February 12, 1849.

Rich helped form a Latter-day Saint settlement in San Bernardino, California. However, this settlement attracted many people who wanted to avoid Young and other leaders of the LDS Church. The members who supported Young were asked to return to Utah in 1857 at the time of the Utah War. At the request of President Brigham Young, Charles C. Rich settled the Bear Lake (on the Utah–Idaho border) region and is the namesake of Rich County, Utah and St. Charles, ID.

In the early 1860s, Rich served as president of the British Mission of the church.

== Death and legacy ==
After suffering from paralysis, Rich died on November 17, 1883, in Paris, Idaho. He has been remembered as "a man of strength and great power of endurance." His granddaughter, Ada May Rich, became the mother of Laraine Day, who became an actress.

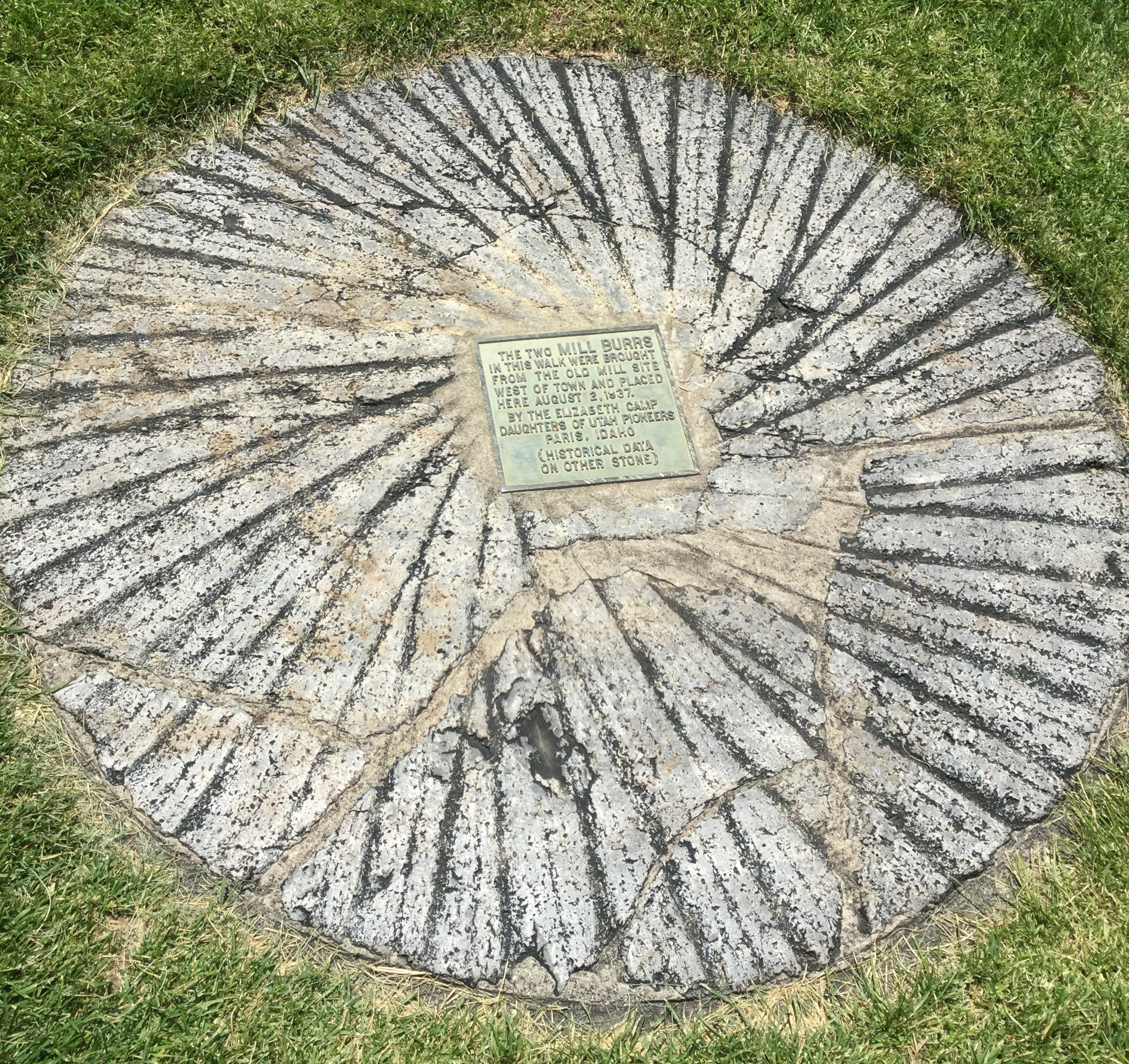
Mill burrs sold to Charles C Rich by Brigham Young in exchange for a pair of mules in 1876 to make flour for the people of Bear Lake Valley.

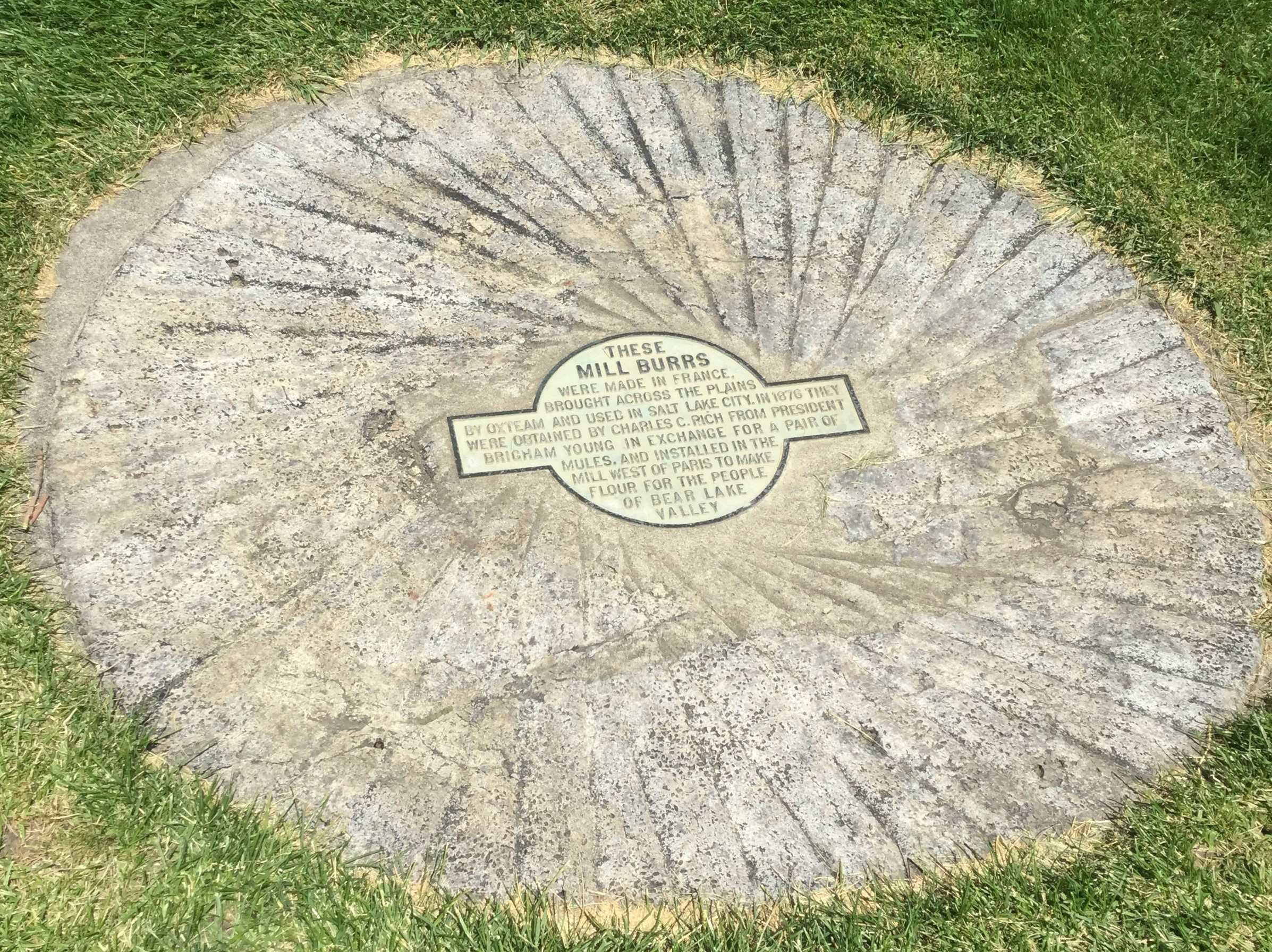
They were made in France and moved across the plains by ox cart and used in Salt Lake City prior to being sold to Rich. They were embedded in a walkway south of the Paris Idaho Tabernacle in 1937.

== Sermons ==
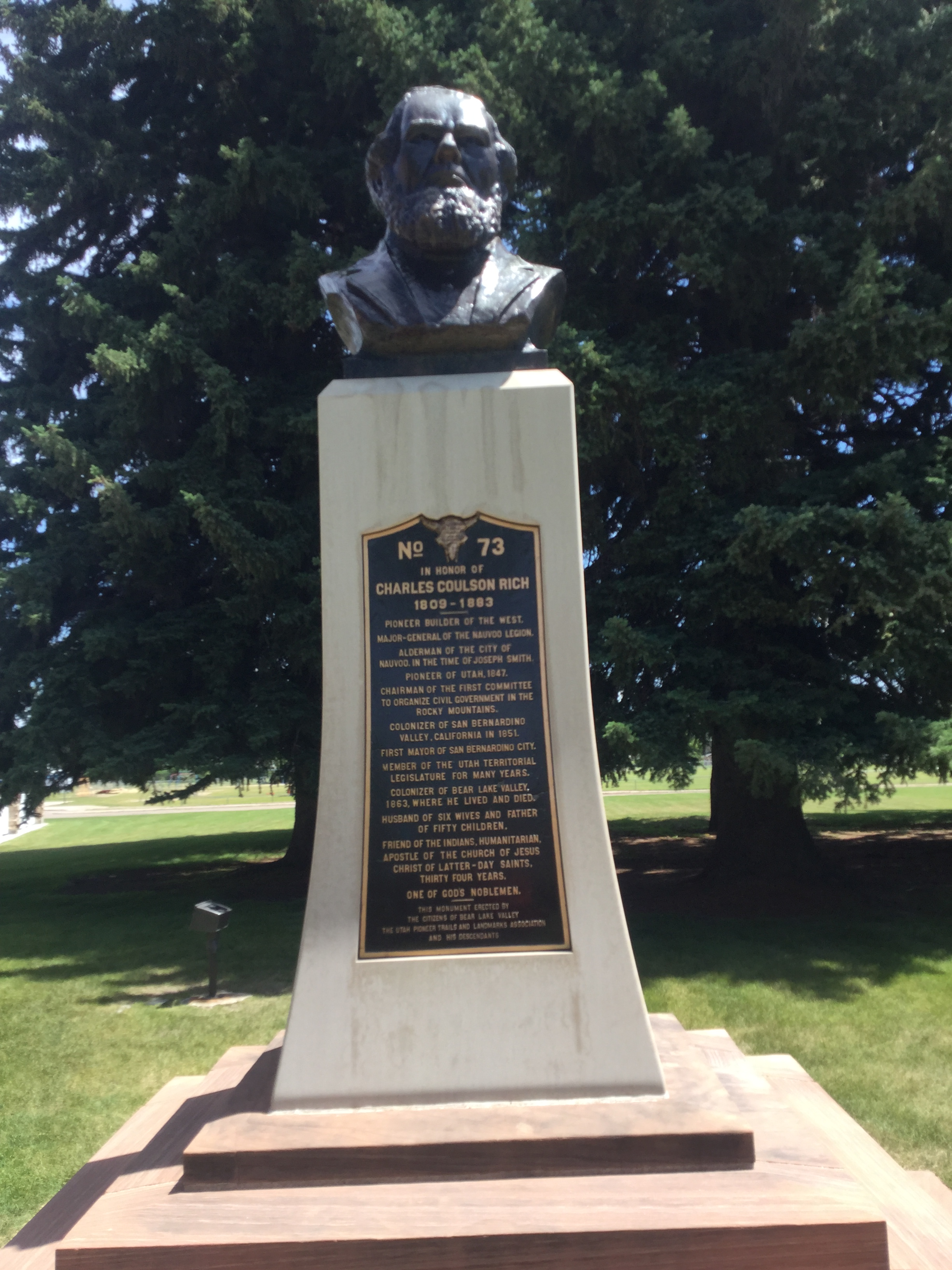
Bust of Charles C. Rich outside of the Paris Idaho Tabernacle.

- "Privileges Better Appreciated By Absence—Present Salvation," Journal of Discourses, vol. 4, pp. 353–54
- "Sufficiency of the Gospel—Obedience to Truth," Journal of Discourses, vol. 5, pp. 296–300
- "Present Opportunities of Obtaining a Knowledge of the Principles of Truth—Importance of Improving Them," Journal of Discourses, vol. 10, pp. 90–95
- "Building the Temple—General Duties of the Saints," Journal of Discourses, vol. 10, pp. 160–63
- "Labor To Build Up The Kingdom," Journal of Discourses, vol. 12, pp. 3–5
- "Saints Should Be Whole-Hearted—Seek First the Kingdom," Journal of Discourses, vol. 19, pp. 26–30
- "Expectations Deferred," Journal of Discourses, vol. 19, pp. 161–68
- "Blessing the Result of Obedience to Law—Our Agency in the Flesh," Journal of Discourses, vol. 19, pp. 249–58
- "No Salvation in Ignorance," Journal of Discourses, vol. 19, pp. 371–76

== Notes ==
The Church of Jesus Christ of Latter-day Saints titles
Preceded by Ezra T. Benson	Quorum of the Twelve Apostles; February 12, 1849 – November 17, 1883	Succeeded by Lorenzo Snow
