= Tahoe Tessie =

Cryptid in Lake Tahoe, USA

Creature information
- Sub grouping: Lake monster
- Similar entities: Loch Ness Monster, Bear Lake Monster, Ogopogo
- Folklore: Tahoe Tessie

Origin
- First attested: Mid-1800s
- Country: United States
- Region: Lake Tahoe, California, Nevada
- Habitat: Water
- Details: Large, serpent-like creature with smooth skin, often described as gray or turquoise.

Location of Lake Tahoe in California and Nevada

Tahoe Tessie is a cryptid said to inhabit the depths of Lake Tahoe, a lake that straddles the border between California and Nevada. Reports of Tessie date back to the mid-19th century, and over time, the creature has become a well-known part of local folklore.

== History ==
One of the earliest accounts of a large creature in Lake Tahoe comes from 1865, when I.C. Coggin, a socialite from San Francisco, reported seeing a massive serpent-like creature. He described it as having a head 14 feet (4.3 m) wide and a body stretching over 600 feet (180 m).

In the 1980s, multiple reports of an unidentified creature in Lake Tahoe emerged from witnesses, including hikers, an optician, and local law enforcement. They described a large, dark figure moving beneath the water’s surface, often creating a noticeable wake. One hiker claimed to have seen a creature "as big as a rowboat", with whitecaps forming around what appeared to be its mouth.

In the 1980s, Mike Conway, a local TV station owner, reported seeing a humped creature during a commercial shoot at Zephyr Cove. He claimed several children shouted "It’s Tessie!" when the water began to rock unexpectedly; however, Conway stated that the footage was later destroyed.

In 2005, Mickey Daniels, a longtime Lake Tahoe fisherman and former sheriff's officer, described seeing a large V-shaped wave cutting through the lake's calm waters, which he believed was not caused by any known fish or boat. Around the same time, visitors Ron Talmage and Beth Douglas reported seeing a dark shape with multiple humps approximately 100 yards (91 m) from shore at Tahoe Park Beach. Although no photographic evidence was obtained, the sighting contributed to the ongoing accounts of strange shapes moving through the lake.

== Washoe influence ==
The legend of Tahoe Tessie is often connected to the beliefs of the Washoe people, who spoke of Water Babies, powerful spirits said to inhabit the lake, particularly around Cave Rock. These beings were believed to have the power to harm those who spoke of them. Other Washoe legends include Ong, a giant bird that was said to have kidnapped children. According to Washoe legend, a young man who strayed too far from his camp was captured by Ong and taken to its nest. The man used shards of obsidian to kill the bird and escape by crafting a boat from one of its wings.

Although some claim that Tessie has roots in Washoe culture, the current form of the legend dates primarily to the 20th century. Tessie's modern appearance is often compared to that of Nessie from Loch Ness, and sightings have been regularly reported since the early 1900s. While some believe in the creature, others see her as a playful figure, often explained away as a giant sturgeon. Tessie is a prominent figure in local art, signs, logos, and a children’s book series.

== Theories and ecosystem ==
Several theories have been proposed to explain the sightings of Tahoe Tessie. One prominent theory suggests that the creature could be a giant sturgeon, a prehistoric-looking fish known to grow to large sizes. Sturgeons are bottom-feeders and have been found in other deep lakes, making them a plausible explanation for the large, dark figures reported in Lake Tahoe.

Another theory points to natural phenomena. According to limnologist Charles Goldman of the UC Davis Tahoe Research Group, many sightings of Tessie, particularly those describing humps or waves, could be caused by wind patterns or water movements creating illusions of large creatures on the lake’s surface.

It has also been speculated that large goldfish, introduced into the lake by pet owners, could be responsible for some sightings of unusual shapes moving beneath the surface. The lake’s depths, which reach over 1,645 feet (501 m), provide an environment where something large could potentially remain hidden. Its ecosystem, which includes fish like rainbow trout and kokanee salmon, could allow a substantially sized predator to remain undetected in the deep waters of a large lake.

In 2022, a year-long project conducted by divers and volunteers, led by the nonprofit group Clean Up the Lake, removed more than 25,000 pounds (11,000 kg) of underwater litter from Lake Tahoe's 72-mile (116 km) shoreline. While no evidence of Tahoe Tessie was uncovered, the divers found various debris such as bottles, tires, fishing gear, and shipwreck planks near Dead Man’s Point—a location tied to local legends of the lake monster.

== Cultural impact ==
By the late 20th century, Tessie had become a more lighthearted figure in local culture, often depicted as a friendly dragon. This version was popularized by Bob McCormick’s children's book series in the 1980s. McCormick also trademarked "The Original Tahoe Lake Monster" and created several Tessie costumes for festivals and public appearances. He operated a gift shop in Kings Beach based around the lake monster for about seven years, selling approximately 110,000 copies of his book. McCormick has also expressed interest in writing another book involving the Washoe legend of Ong.

In 2021, Tessie was featured on Fox Nation's show Monsters Across America, where the episode focused on local legends and cryptid sightings in Lake Tahoe. That same year, Tessie became the mascot for an anti-litter campaign titled "Love Our Lake," which used the slogan "Don’t mess with Tessie" to encourage environmental stewardship.

In 2023, the ECHL's new hockey team, the Tahoe Knight Monsters, was named after the folklore surrounding Tessie. The team, co-owned by former NFL quarterback Tim Tebow and businessman David Hodges, adopted a dragon-like creature for its logo, drawing inspiration from local folklore. The team’s colors—teal, black, and gold—were chosen to reflect the lake and surrounding mountains. The team began competing in the 2024–25 season in the ECHL's Mountain Division, alongside teams from Idaho, Utah, Allen, Tulsa, Wichita, Rapid City, and Kansas City.

== See also ==
- Water Babies
- Loch Ness Monster
- Bear Lake monster
- North Shore Monster
- Ong (Washoe folklore)
- Cryptid
