= Senator Rich =

Senator Rich may refer to:

- John T. Rich (1841–1926), Michigan State Senate
- Joseph C. Rich (1841–1908), Idaho State Senate
- Nan Rich (born 1942), Florida State Senate

== See also ==
- William G. Ritch (1830–1904), Wisconsin State Senate
