= Liberty, Idaho =

Unincorporated community in the state of Idaho, United States

- Unincorporated community
- Location within the state of Idaho Location within the United States
- Coordinates: 42°23′28″N 111°19′15″W
- Country: United States
- State: Idaho
- County: Bear Lake
- Elevation: 5,987 ft (1,825 m)
- Time zone: UTC-7 (Mountain (MST))
  - Summer (DST): UTC-6 (MDT)
- GNIS feature ID: 384597

Liberty is an unincorporated community in Bear Lake County, Idaho, United States, about 6.75 miles (10.86 km) north–northwest of Paris along U.S. Route 30;

== History ==
The community was first settled by settlers of The Church of Jesus Christ of Latter-day Saints under the overall leadership of Charles C. Rich in 1864.

Liberty's population was 80 in 1909, and was 60 in 1960.
