= Utah Lake Monster =

Legendary lake monster of Utah Lake, Utah

Coordinates: 40°14′N 111°48′W

Creature information
- Sub grouping: Lake monster
- Similar entities: Bear Lake Monster, North Shore Monster, Moon Lake Monster

Origin
- First attested: 1864
- Country: United States
- Region: Utah Lake, Utah
- Habitat: Water
- Details: Described by witnesses as a large, serpentine creature with a head resembling a hound.

Location of Utah Lake in Utah

The Utah Lake Monster is a legendary creature reportedly inhabiting Utah Lake in Utah County. The legend may have roots in local Ute traditions regarding aquatic beings known as Pawapicts (or "Water Babies"), and continued through sightings reported by 19th-century settlers.

== History and sightings ==
The first recorded encounter occurred in 1864, when settler Isaac Fox reported being chased to the shore by a large animal with "wicked, black eyes" and a head resembling a "vicious-looking hound." In September 1870, commercial fishermen from Springville discovered a large skull fragment on the lakeshore. The artifact reportedly featured tooth sockets the size of an ox's and a five-inch tusk; while held as evidence of the monster at the time, modern historians suggest it was likely a fossilized mastodon remain.

In 1871, LDS Bishop William Price reported sighting a snake-like creature roughly 60 feet long near Goshen. Price described the animal as standing several feet out of the water "like a section of a large stove pipe." In August 1870, two boys swimming near Provo reported being chased by a creature with a mouth 18 inches wide. Later sightings include a 1921 report by Frank Grasteit, who observed a seal-shaped animal near Mosida, Utah, and a 2006 report of a serpentine creature near Saratoga Springs, Utah.

== Folklore and theories ==
Indigenous Ute traditions warned of "Water Babies" inhabiting the lake—dangerous spirits that mimicked the sound of a crying infant to lure people to the water's edge.

Skeptics have proposed natural explanations for sightings, including floating logs, formation-swimming pelicans, or "black otters" distorted by heat mirages. An 1877 report in the Corinne Record speculated the creature might travel to the Great Salt Lake via subterranean channels, linking it to the North Shore Monster legend.

== See also ==
- Bear Lake Monster
- North Shore Monster
