= Nounan, Idaho =

Unincorporated community in the state of Idaho, United States

Nounan
- Unincorporated community
- Location within the state of Idaho
- Coordinates: 42°28′40″N 111°27′04″W
- Country: United States
- State: Idaho
- County: Bear Lake
- Elevation: 5,974 ft (1,821 m)
- Time zone: UTC-7 (Mountain (MST))
  - Summer (DST): UTC-6 (MDT)
- GNIS feature ID: 396975

Nounan is an unincorporated community in Bear Lake County, Idaho. It is located in the southeast corner of the state, a few miles west of Georgetown.

== History ==
At one time, Nounan had a post office and elementary school and LDS Church meetinghouse, but its population shrunk substantially over the last half of the twentieth century and none of these function today, although some public buildings have been converted into private residences. The church is currently a home and the school has been converted into a hay barn.

The economy of Nounan has traditionally been based on agriculture.
