= North Shore Monster =

Mythical creature in the Great Salt Lake, Utah

Coordinates: 41°09′N 112°40′W

Creature information
- Other name: Old Briney
- Sub grouping: Lake monster
- Similar entities: Bear Lake Monster, Moon Lake Monster, Utah Lake Monster, Loch Ness Monster, Champ

Origin
- First attested: July 8, 1877
- Country: United States
- Region: Great Salt Lake, Utah
- Habitat: Water
- Details: Large creature with a crocodile-like body and the head of a horse.

Location of the Great Salt Lake in the state of Utah.

The North Shore Monster, sometimes referred to as "Old Briney," reportedly inhabits the Great Salt Lake in Utah. Descriptions of the monster vary, but it is most commonly described as having a crocodile-like body and the head of a horse.

== Sightings ==
The most well-known sighting occurred on July 8, 1877, when J.H. McNeil and other workers at the Barnes and Co. saltworks near Monument Point on the lake's northern shore claimed to have encountered a large creature with a crocodile-like body and the head of a horse. McNeil estimated the creature to be about 75 feet long. The creature reportedly let out a loud bellow as it approached the shore, prompting the men to flee into the nearby mountains, where they hid overnight. The next morning, they found large overturned boulders and disturbed ground along the shoreline.

McNeil signed an affidavit attesting to the sighting, and the story was published in the Corinne Record and later in the Salt Lake Herald-Republican and the Deseret News. However, the Deseret News suggested that the report should be taken "with a few grains of salt." Some skeptics proposed that the "monster" may have been a buffalo in the lake, although the reported length of 75 feet does not align with this explanation.

When the Utah Lake Monster (different from both the Bear Lake Monster and North Shore monster) was spotted shortly after the Monument Point account, the Corrinne Record claimed that it was likely the same monster as seen at monument point, but such a connection is unlikely.

== Alternate monsters of the Great Salt lake ==
Various monsters have been purported to live within the Great Salt Lake, of which the North Shore monster (as described in the 1877 Monument Point account) is only one. The North Shore monster account is sometimes conflated with these other monsters. Here is a brief list of other Salt Lake monsters.

Around thirty years prior to McNeil's encounter, a man identified as Brother Bainbridge claimed to have seen a creature with a dolphin-like body in the lake near Antelope Island. Another official of The Church of Jesus Christ of Latter Day Saints, referred to as Brother Kimball, reported seeing a porpoise in the lake on April 19, 1848. These sightings led to Antelope Island initially being named "Porpoise Island." Some theories suggest that the men may have mistaken large carp swimming in the less salty waters of Farmington Bay for these creature(s).

In 1903, a story circulated about a "salt dragon" seen near Stansbury island by two hunters named Matin Gilbery and John Barry. They described being chased by a large winged creature that was "equally at home in the air, on the beach, or submerged in the briny waters of Salt Lake". They also mentioned that its swimming in the lake had led to a thick crust of salt over its armored skin, which reflected bullets fired from their muskets. This story is still recounted by state park rangers in the modern day.

Additional early reports linked the monster to native Ute legends of "Water Babies," mystical beings said to inhabit lakes and lure unsuspecting victims into the water. Some settlers in the 1860s claimed the Water Babies were manifestations of the North Shore monster itself.

In 1976, a short independent horror film titled Attack of the Giant Brine Shrimp was produced by Salt Lake local Mike Cassidy. The film depicts a fictional account of a giant mutated brine shrimp being born from the polluted waters of the lake. It causes the fire of the Saltair, terrorizes locals at a circus, and attempts to destroy the Salt Lake Temple. The creature in the film has become a cryptid of its own, referred to local enthusiasts as "Ol' Briney" or the "great brine shrimp". Although gaining some popularity, it is likely that this cryptid is entirely based on Cassidy's film monster.

== Environmental factors ==
The Great Salt Lake's salinity fluctuates between 3.5 and 8 times that of the ocean, depending on location and water levels, and has a maximum depth of 33 feet. These extreme conditions limit the types of life that can thrive in the lake, with only a few species such as brine shrimp and brine flies found in the main lake. Carp and other fish species are able to survive in the freshwater wetlands and tributaries surrounding the lake.

Despite the challenging environment, legends about large creatures inhabiting the lake persist. These tales may have been influenced by sightings of unusual phenomena or by misunderstandings of natural occurrences in the lake's unique ecosystem.

One speculative theory suggests that shifts in the lake’s salinity levels and water temperature may influence sightings of unusual phenomena. Periodic fluctuations in salinity can create mirage-like optical effects on the water’s surface, potentially contributing to monster lore.

== See also ==
- Bear Lake Monster
- Moon Lake Monster
- Utah Lake Monster
- Great Salt Lake whale hoax
- List of reported lake monsters
- Living fossils
