= Moon Lake Monster =

Legendary creature in Moon Lake, Utah

Creature information
- Other name: Moonie
- Sub grouping: Lake monster
- Similar entities: Bear Lake Monster, Utah Lake Monster

Origin
- Country: United States
- Region: Moon Lake, Utah
- Habitat: Water
- Details: Described as a dark, serpentine creature estimated at 12 to 15 feet in length.

The Moon Lake Monster, colloquially known as Moonie, is a cryptid reported to inhabit Moon Lake in the Uinta Mountains of Duchesne County, Utah. While often overshadowed by the Bear Lake Monster, Moonie is a fixture of local folklore in the High Uintas.

== Legends and sightings ==
The legend of a creature in the lake has roots in local folklore, including accounts attributed to the Ute people who historically avoided the area, describing the lake as being inhabited by "water spirits" or Water babies. Traditional stories suggest the lake was viewed with caution due to these spirits' perceived ability to pull individuals beneath the surface.

Modern sightings typically describe a large, dark, serpentine entity that creates distinctive V-shaped wake patterns on the water's surface. In 1994, Bill Reardon, a local author and former owner of the Moon Lake Resort, reported observing a ripple through binoculars that moved steadily across the lake in a "zigzag" pattern, which he concluded was inconsistent with the behavior of beavers or waterfowl native to the area. Other witnesses have described the creature as appearing like a "bumpy log" with visible scales, estimated to be between 12 and 15 feet long.

== Environmental context ==
Moon Lake is a high-altitude lake situated at approximately 8,100 feet. Originally a natural glacial lake, it was expanded in the 1930s by the construction of the Moon Lake Dam. Its crescent shape and significant depth—reaching over 100 feet in some sections—have contributed to local myths of "bottomless" areas and subterranean channels connecting to other water systems in the Uinta Basin.

== See also ==
- Bear Lake Monster
- Utah Lake Monster
- Skinwalker Ranch (located in the same region)
