= Black Bear Resort =

- Interactive map of Black Bear Resort
- Location: Bear Lake County, Idaho; United States
- Nearest city: Montpelier, Idaho; 18 miles – (29 km)
- Coordinates: 42°9′44″N 111°26′3″W
- Base elevation: 6,900 ft (2,100 m)
- Snowfall: 300" (762 cm)
- Website: BlackBear.com

Black Bear Resort is located in the South Eastern Corner of Idaho in Bear Lake County, about 140 miles (230 km) north of Salt Lake City, Utah, and about 136 miles (219 km) south of Jackson Hole, Wyoming. The project originally began in 2002 with an initial plan to develop land adjacent to the Caribou–Targhee forest service boundary into 20-acre (81,000 m^{2}) parcels with individual wells. In 2004 the Idaho Department of Water Resources adopted a water mitigation plan allowing the transfer of water rights from one property in a county to another. This single act provided the opportunity to secure ample water for a high density housing project like Black Bear Resort. However, on 31 January 2011, the Idaho Department of Water Resources denied Black Bear Resort's application for water use (see reference in "History" section, below).

== Overview ==
This resort development proposal is based on three distinct village communities all on or adjacent to Bear Lake. As planned, the development of Black Bear Resort is moving according to three schedules.

The Mountain Community is farthest along. The entire 2,207 acres (8.93 km^{2}) have been rezoned from agricultural to large scale development. The Mountain Community Conceptual Master Plan and the Preliminary Plat for Phase I have been submitted and approved by the Bear Lake County Commission. Engineering and other work to achieve entitlement for all Phase I properties and the legal right to sell in the open market is underway. Tom Weiskopf has designed a signature golf course, which has been surveyed onto the mountain plateau. Seven of eighteen holes plus the teaching facility have been cut and initial work is underway on the remaining holes. Main roads have been graded and packed with road base, ready for paving. The first alpine ski runs at the North Face and Cassidy's have been defined. Custom home sites and development super pads have been surveyed onto the site. Based on approval of Final Plat, Phase I properties in the Mountain Community will be released in stages.

The Ranches Community is the second of three parts to move toward County approval. It will consist of four to 7-acre (28,000 m^{2}) ranch sites. It will be linked to the Mountain Community via US Highway 89 and U. S. Forest Service trails open to ATV, snowmobile, horse and foot traffic. Eight hundred ninety six (896) acres of mountain land have been acquired and another nine hundred (900) are under a BLM Use Permit. Development designs are now underway and documentation is being prepared for submittal to the Bear Lake County Planning and Zoning Commission.

The Lake Community is still conceptual in nature. Plans include members of the resort having access to all three communities regardless of where their private property is located inside the resort.

== History ==
Date	Description
May 2004	Co-founders Auger and Barrett acquire the first mountain properties at Black Bear with the concept of creating 5-acre (20,000 m^{2}) hunting lodge parcels having access to thousands of acres owned by the US Forest Service.
July 2004	The first water mitigation plan was approved for a development called The Reserve at Bear Lake, making it possible to sub-develop large parcels of land in the Idaho portion of Bear Lake Valley. Through water transfer, unused water rights on one property can be transferred to and used on another thus increasing the development density. This created a completely new development model for land under the Black Bear umbrella.
Jan 2005	Auger and Barrett begin work assembling other lands at or near the mountain property including beachfront properties directly on Bear Lake.
Jan 2006	Land planning and engineering commence for development of the Mountain Community. Development concepts for the Lake Community, Marina, Inland Waterway and other facilities at the lake were studied and reviewed with various agencies.
29 June 2007	Bear Lake County adopted its Master PUD Ordinance governing developments in excess of 500 acres (2.0 km^{2}). This extensive document was prepared by the county with the guidance of a national consultant and input from Black Bear Resort. The Master PUD Ordinance outlines four main steps to receive approval of a development and the right to sell entitled property.
July 2007	Work begins on the Mountain Community. Main roads, the Tom Weiskopf golf course, test wells and temporary sales facilities are all under construction.
9 Oct 2007	Black Bear Resort successfully applied for and received Planning and Zoning approval to rezone 2,207 acres (8.93 km^{2}) of land known as the mountain property. Rezoning was from agricultural use to planned unit development.
29 May 2008	Black Bear Resort received Planning and Zoning approval if its Conceptual Master Plan for the Mountain Community, which will be sent to the Bear Lake County Commission for final approval. This covers 2,207 acres (8.93 km^{2}) of planned development.
29 May 2008	Black Bear Resort received approval of its Preliminary Plat for Phase I of the Mountain Community, which will be sent to the Bear Lake County Commission for final approval. This covers specific portions of development and establishes certain parameters that must be followed in the process of construction.
18 June 2008	Black Bear Resort received approval from the Bear Lake County Commission of both its Conceptual Master Plan and Preliminary Plat Phase I for the Mountain Community.
26 June 2008	Black Bear Resort is officially announced at a major media event in Salt Lake City and nationwide exposure follows.
26 Aug 2008	The first public sales presentation of Black Bear Resort takes place in Salt Lake City. A number of Priority Reservations are taken for the inaugural property release of the Mountain Community Phase I.
14 Dec 2009	Bear Lake County make amendments to Subdivision & Land Use Ordinance, Adoption of Conservation Subdivision Ordinance and Road Policy. Allowing for the submital of The Ranches at Black Bear master plan.
31 Jan 2011	After protests by many local landowners and individuals in the Bear Lake Valley area, the Idaho Department of Water Resources issued a preliminary order denying Black Bear Resort, also known as The Retreat at Bear Lake, a permit for groundwater use. The order was signed by James Cefalo, the Water Resources Program Manager. The director was expected to issue a final order within 56 days of receipt of the written briefs, oral argument, or response to brief. Unless more factual development of the record was presented, he was expected then to issue a final order with the same finding. Source: Idaho State Journal, 11 Feb 2011.
