= Great Salt Lake whale hoax =

Hoax/Legend of whales in the Great Salt Lake, Utah

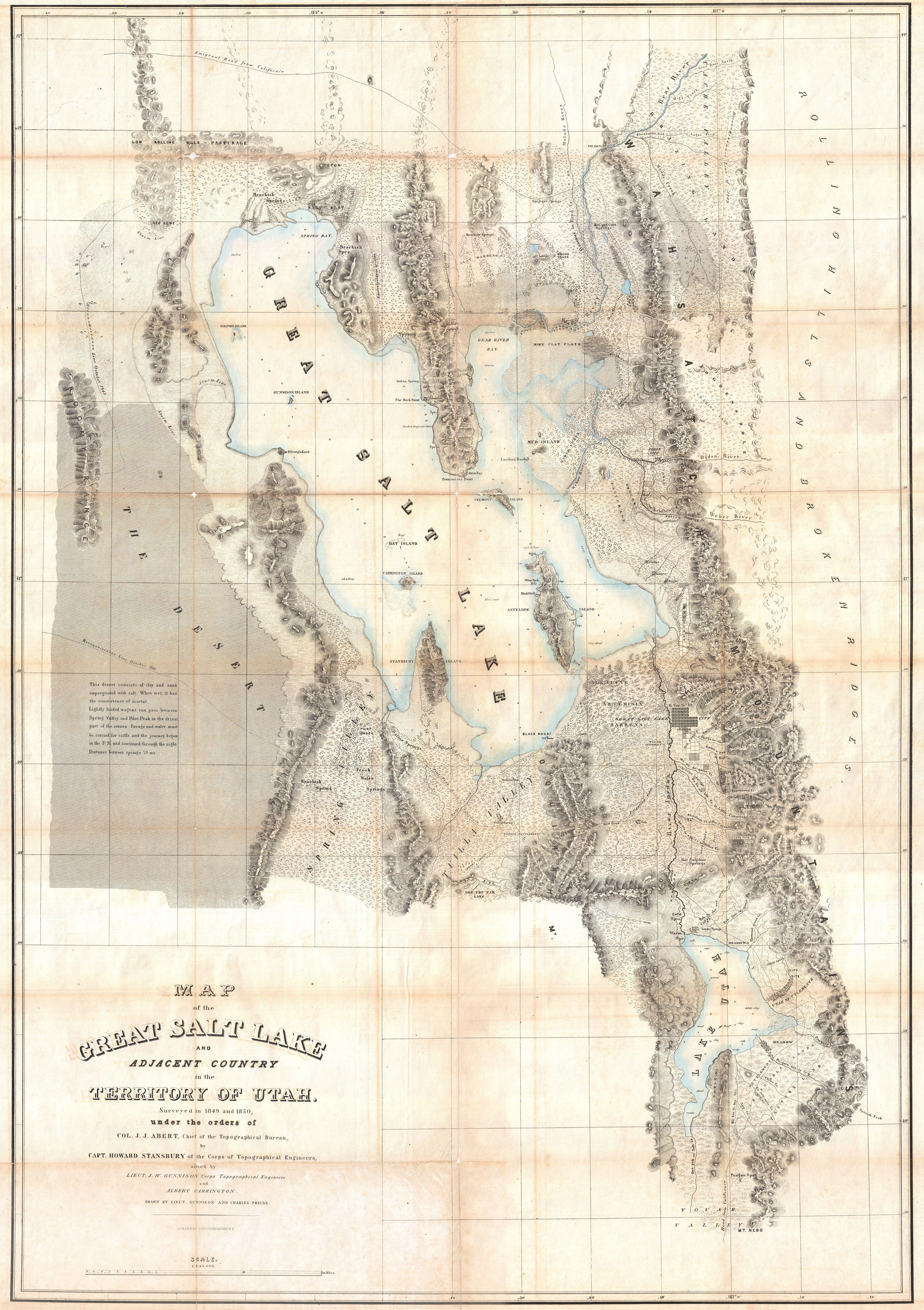
19th-century map of the Great Salt Lake

The Great Salt Lake whale hoax is a 19th-century hoax and urban legend from Utah, which has appeared in various accounts over time. The story centers around a supposed attempt by a British scientist, James Wickham, to introduce whales into the Great Salt Lake with the intention of starting a whale oil industry.

== Background and origin ==
The story was first reported in 1888 when the Salt Lake Herald-Republican reprinted an article originally published in a Canadian newspaper. The article claimed that British scientist and entrepreneur James Wickham had introduced two whales into the Great Salt Lake in 1875, with the goal of establishing a whale oil industry in Utah.

According to the article, Wickham captured the whales near Australia and transported them from San Francisco, California, to Utah by train in specially designed tanks filled with seawater. Upon their release into the lake, the whales reportedly broke free from a fenced enclosure and disappeared into deeper waters. The story also claimed that years later, an agent in contact with Wickham reported seeing the whales and their offspring "spouting and playing" in the lake.

Further reports from the Jefferson County Sentinel, an Ohio-based newspaper, in May 1888 added more detail to the hoax. One article included a letter from a Cleveland, Ohio, resident humorously asking whether a permit from the Church of Jesus Christ of Latter-day Saints, whose members constituted a majority of Utah's population at the time, would be required to begin a whaling industry in the Great Salt Lake. The letter recounted Wickham's experiment, stating that the whales had grown significantly since their release and had produced offspring.

In 1890, the Utah Daily Enquirer, a (now-defunct) newspaper from Provo, published an account marking the 15th anniversary of the alleged introduction of the whales. The report stated that the whales had grown to 60 feet (18 m) in length and produced offspring. The Enquirer portrayed Wickham's experiment as a success, despite the unlikely nature of the claims.

== Public response and debunking ==
The story of whales thriving in the Great Salt Lake was met with skepticism, largely due to the lake's high salinity (between 1.5 and 8 times saltier than seawater) and shallow depth (average 16 ft (5 m), deepest 46 ft (14 m)), which are unsuitable environments for large marine mammals. Despite this, the legend endured in various retellings. The Deseret News and other sources debunked the story, pointing out factual errors, such as the claim that whales lay eggs—an impossibility given that whales are placental mammals.

Some media outlets, such as the Jefferson County Sentinel, added humorous embellishments, suggesting that the whales could be used to power ferry boats across the lake. The Utah Historical Quarterly also highlighted that the claims of Wickham's experiment were exaggerated, portraying them as a product of the creative imagination of the time, meant more for entertainment than factual reporting.

== Legacy and modern retellings ==
In 2019, artists Christine Baczek and David Hyams featured the story in their exhibit "Whale of a Tale" at the Rio Gallery in Salt Lake City. The exhibit included historical-style photographs (tintypes) depicting fictional scenes of the whales being transported to the Great Salt Lake. In 2021, Professor Justin Diggle created a print, A Whale from the Great Salt Lake, Utah, for the imPRESSions Open Printmaking Biennial. The print is a collage of photographs taken around Antelope Island, depicting the whale myth.

In July 2023, the short mockumentary film Utah Blues: Whales in the Great Salt Lake released. It retold the story as if it were fact, with some additions, such as specifying the species as Blue whales, and included purported eyewitness accounts and an expedition to find the whales in the present day. In August 2023, the independent short film Whales of the High Desert, directed by Joseph LeBaron, was released. It focuses on the origins and continuation of the whale legend, based on an interview with Dr. Lynne McNeill, a folklore specialist at Utah State University. The film also addresses environmental concerns related to the Great Salt Lake. Produced in collaboration with FRIENDS of Great Salt Lake, the film was an Official Selection of the Utah International Film Festival, with plans for distribution on PBS in the fall of 2024.

== See also ==
- Bear Lake Monster
- North Shore Monster
- Out of the Blue (sculpture)
