= Ong (Washoe folklore) =

Legendary giant bird from Washoe (Wašiw) folklore that inhabited Lake

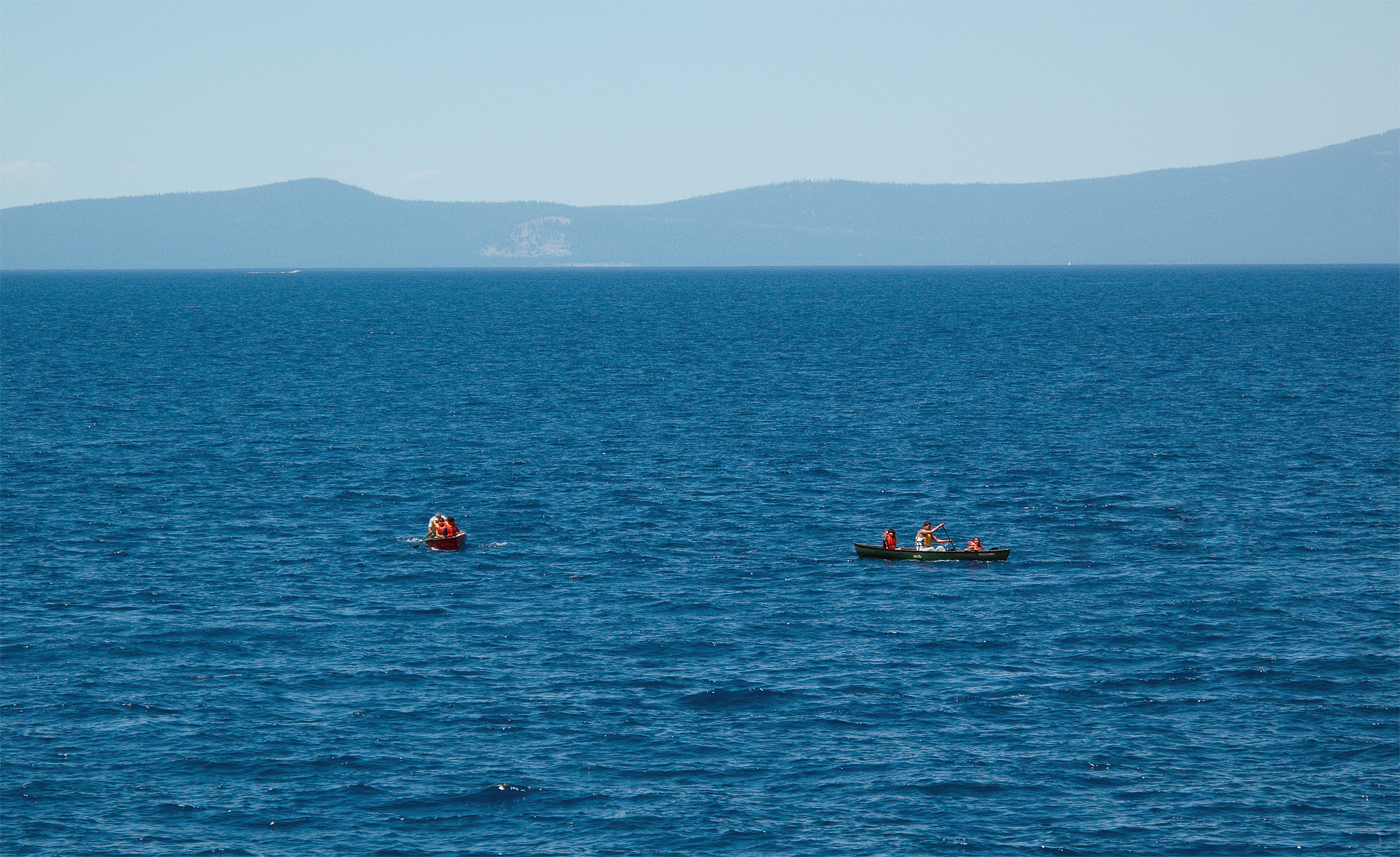
- Canoeing on Lake Tahoe. Washoe tradition warned against solitary travel on the lake due to the Ong.

Creature information
- Other name: None
- Grouping: Mythological bird
- Similar entities: Thunderbird (mythology), Roc (mythology)
- Folklore: Washoe (Wašiw) mythology

Origin
- First attested: Washoe oral tradition
- Country: United States
- Region: Lake Tahoe, California, Nevada

The Ong is a supernatural creature from Washoe (wa·šiw) folklore, described as a giant bird with an eagle-like body, the face of a human warrior, and wings longer than the tallest pine trees. According to Washoe oral tradition, the Ong inhabited the waters of Lake Tahoe (wa·šiw: Da ow aga), where it was believed to prey on individuals who approached the shoreline alone. Legends characterize the creature as an apex predator of the lake, dragging victims to a nest at the center of the water.

Location of Lake Tahoe on the California-Nevada border.

== Description and behavior ==
In Washoe mythology, the Ong is depicted as a massive bird possessing tough feathers and scales that functioned as armor against weapons. Descriptions vary between a reptilian avian and a hybrid creature with the torso of an eagle and a human warrior's face. Its wingspan was said to be sufficient to create powerful winds capable of bending trees along the lake's shore during flight.

The creature's nest was reportedly located on a stone spire at the center of Lake Tahoe. Washoe tradition holds that the lake's currents would pull animals and people toward this central point to be consumed. The absence of recovered bodies from drownings in Lake Tahoe was historically attributed to the Ong's nesting habits. To mitigate the risk of capture, Washoe members historically avoided traveling or fishing in isolation, as the Ong was believed to target lone individuals rather than groups or camps.

== Tribal legends ==
The primary Washoe legend regarding the Ong involves the capture of a Washoe man who was carried to the creature's nest on a spire rising from the water. The captive observed that the Ong closed its eyes while chewing and used this behavior to devise a plan for escape. He threw several paćágaʔ (obsidian arrowheads) into the creature's open mouth throughout the day, causing it to become ill and eventually die. Following a storm that lasted through the night, the man used one of the Ong's massive feathers as a boat to navigate back to the shore.

== Literary variations ==
A variation of the legend appeared in Sunset Magazine in 1905, which introduced a warrior named Tahoe who sought to prove his bravery. In this account, Tahoe ties himself to the creature’s leg after it seizes him, preventing himself from being dropped. He poisons the bird by throwing arrowheads into its mouth while in flight, eventually causing it to crash into the lake. While the Ong is defeated in these narratives, modern local lore occasionally claims its nest remains at the bottom of the lake as a folk explanation for why bodies are rarely recovered from Tahoe's deep, cold waters.

== See also ==
- Thunderbird (mythology)
- Water babies
- Tahoe Tessie
- Roc (mythology)
