= Bennington, Idaho =

Census-designated place in Bear Lake County, Idaho, United States

Bennington
- Census-designated place
- Location of Bennington in Bear Lake County, Idaho.

- Location within the state of Idaho Location in the United States
- Coordinates: 42°22′38″N 111°19′13″W
- Country: United States
- State: Idaho
- County: Bear Lake

Area
  - Total: 6.342 sq mi (16.43 km^{2})
  - Land: 6.338 sq mi (16.42 km^{2})
  - Water: 0.004 sq mi (0.010 km^{2})
- Elevation: 6,008 ft (1,831 m)

Population (2020)
  - Total: 236
  - Density: 37.2/sq mi (14.4/km^{2})
- Time zone: UTC-7 (Mountain (MST))
  - Summer (DST): UTC-6 (MDT)
- FIPS code: 16-06670
- GNIS feature ID: 2585567

Bennington is a census-designated place in Bear Lake County, Idaho, United States. As of the 2020 census, its population was 236. It is located in the southeast corner of the (State of Idaho) on U.S. Route 30 about 5 miles (8.0 km) north of Montpelier and 12 miles (19 km) south of Georgetown.

== History ==
Bennington is a small farming community settled by Mormon Pioneers in 1864. It was named by Brigham Young after a town in Vermont near where he was born and grew up. Many of the inhabitants in Bennington are direct descendants of these early pioneers.

Among its founders was Amos Wright who, according to his grandson, the Bennington-born writer David L. Wright, before founding Bennington was excommunicated from the Church of Jesus Christ of Latter-day Saints for riding his horse into a meetinghouse and shooting out the lights. He was later rebaptised, before going on to found Bennington.

Its elevation is 6,008 feet (1,831 m).

== Demographics ==
Historical population
Census	Pop.	Note	%±
2010	190		—
2020	236		24.2%
U.S. Decennial Census

Bennington's population was estimated at 50 in 1909, and was 100 in 1960.

== Notable people ==
- John Tippets, Idaho State Senator.

== See also ==
- List of census-designated places in Idaho
