= Bear Lake County, Idaho =

County in Idaho, United States

- County
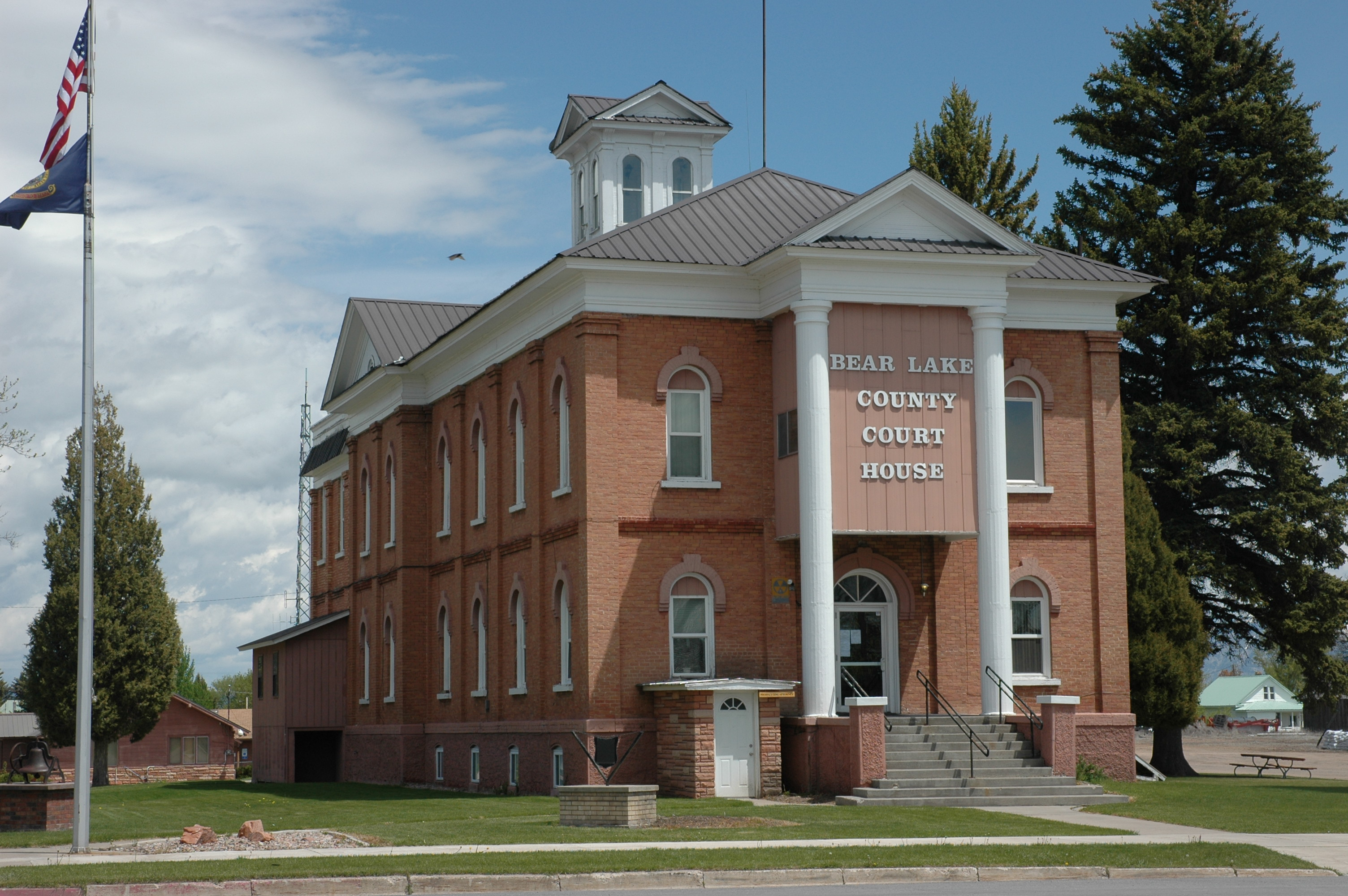
- Bear Lake County Courthouse

- Seal

- Location within the U.S. state of Idaho
- Coordinates: 42°17′N 111°20′W
- Country: United States
- State: Idaho
- Founded: January 5, 1875
- Named for: Bear Lake
- Seat: Paris
- Largest city: Montpelier

Area
  - Total: 1,049 sq mi (2,720 km^{2})
  - Land: 975 sq mi (2,530 km^{2})
  - Water: 75 sq mi (190 km^{2}) 7.1%

Population (2020)
  - Total: 6,372
  - Estimate (2025): 6,727 ▲
  - Density: 6/sq mi (2.3/km^{2})
- Time zone: UTC−7 (Mountain)
  - Summer (DST): UTC−6 (MDT)
- Congressional district: 2nd
- Website: bearlakecounty.info

Bear Lake County is a county in the U.S. state of Idaho. As of the 2020 United States census the county had a population of 6,372. The county seat is Paris, and Montpelier is the largest city.

The county is named after Bear Lake, a large lake at an elevation of 5,924 feet (1,806 m) above sea level. The northern half of the 20-mile-long (32-kilometer) lake is in Idaho, the southern half in Utah. The county was established in 1875 in the Idaho Territory, fifteen years before statehood.

== History ==
Peg-Leg Smith established a trading post on the Oregon Trail from 1848 to 1850 near Dingle.

The first settlement in the Bear Lake Valley was Paris, settled by Mormon pioneers led by Charles Rich on September 26, 1863; thirty families comprised the original settlement. In the spring of 1864, Montpelier was settled on the other side of the valley on the Oregon Trail. Bear Lake County was established in 1875, and the railroad was extended through Montpelier in 1892.

== Economy ==
A heavily rural county, Bear Lake's economy is predominantly agricultural, although tourism has been increasing as an industry in recent years. Bear Lake is well known for its cattle ranches and grain farms, although these industries are susceptible to the region's high elevation and long winters. Bear Lake County is home to the northern half of its namesake, Bear Lake, and the popularity of Bear Lake National Wildlife Refuge has led to a building boom surrounding the lake in the southern side of the county. Montpelier serves as the county's center of commerce, and seasonal commerce picks up during the summer.

== Geography ==
Bear Lake County comprises the state's southeast corner. Its east boundary line abuts the west line of the state of Wyoming and its south boundary line abuts the north line of the state of Utah. According to the U.S. Census Bureau, the county has a total area of 1,049 square miles (2,720 km^{2}), of which 975 sq mi (2,530 km^{2}) is land and 75 sq mi (190 km^{2}) (6.1%) is water. The county is centered on Bear Lake Valley and includes the surrounding mountain ranges. The valley is high in the mountains, with its lowest elevation over 5,900 feet (1,800 m) above sea level. The highest point in the county is Meade Peak at 9,957 feet (3,035 m).

=== Adjacent counties ===
- Caribou County - north
- Lincoln County, Wyoming - east
- Rich County, Utah - south
- Franklin County - west

=== Major highways ===
- - US 30
- - US 89
- - SH-36
- - SH-61

=== National protected areas ===
- Bear Lake National Wildlife Refuge
- Cache National Forest (part)
- Caribou National Forest (part)

== Demographics ==
Historical population
| Census | Pop. | Note | %± |
|---|---|---|---|
| 1880 | 3,235 | | — |
| 1890 | 6,057 | | 87.2% |
| 1900 | 7,051 | | 16.4% |
| 1910 | 7,729 | | 9.6% |
| 1920 | 8,783 | | 13.6% |
| 1930 | 7,872 | | −10.4% |
| 1940 | 7,911 | | 0.5% |
| 1950 | 6,834 | | −13.6% |
| 1960 | 7,148 | | 4.6% |
| 1970 | 5,801 | | −18.8% |
| 1980 | 6,931 | | 19.5% |
| 1990 | 6,084 | | −12.2% |
| 2000 | 6,411 | | 5.4% |
| 2010 | 5,986 | | −6.6% |
| 2020 | 6,372 | | 6.4% |
| 2025 (est.) | 6,727 | ▲ | 5.6% |
US Decennial Census; 1790–1960, 1900–1990, 1990–2000, 2020

=== Racial and ethnic composition ===
Bear Lake County, Idaho – Racial and ethnic composition Note: the US Census treats Hispanic/Latino as an ethnic category. This table excludes Latinos from the racial categories and assigns them to a separate category. Hispanics/Latinos may be of any race.
| Race / Ethnicity (NH = Non-Hispanic) | Pop 1980 | Pop 1990 | Pop 2000 | Pop 2010 | Pop 2020 | % 1980 | % 1990 | % 2000 | % 2010 | % 2020 |
|---|---|---|---|---|---|---|---|---|---|---|
| White alone (NH) | 6,788 | 5,928 | 6,195 | 5,671 | 5,977 | 97.94% | 97.44% | 96.63% | 94.74% | 93.80% |
| Black or African American alone (NH) | 2 | 0 | 6 | 6 | 10 | 0.03% | 0.00% | 0.09% | 0.10% | 0.16% |
| Native American or Alaska Native alone (NH) | 31 | 15 | 27 | 21 | 25 | 0.45% | 0.25% | 0.42% | 0.35% | 0.39% |
| Asian alone (NH) | 12 | 5 | 2 | 22 | 13 | 0.17% | 0.08% | 0.03% | 0.37% | 0.20% |
| Native Hawaiian or Pacific Islander alone (NH) | x | x | 3 | 1 | 2 | x | x | 0.05% | 0.02% | 0.03% |
| Other race alone (NH) | 0 | 0 | 0 | 5 | 0 | 0.00% | 0.00% | 0.00% | 0.08% | 0.00% |
| Mixed race or Multiracial (NH) | x | x | 24 | 44 | 137 | x | x | 0.37% | 0.74% | 2.15% |
| Hispanic or Latino (any race) | 98 | 136 | 154 | 216 | 208 | 1.41% | 2.24% | 2.40% | 3.61% | 3.26% |
| Total | 6,931 | 6,084 | 6,411 | 5,986 | 6,372 | 100.00% | 100.00% | 100.00% | 100.00% | 100.00% |

=== 2020 census ===
As of the 2020 census, the county had a population of 6,372. The median age was 40.1 years. 27.3% of residents were under the age of 18 and 21.5% of residents were 65 years of age or older. For every 100 females there were 100.8 males, and for every 100 females age 18 and over there were 100.4 males age 18 and over.

The racial makeup of the county was 94.7% White, 0.2% Black or African American, 0.5% American Indian and Alaska Native, 0.2% Asian, 0.0% Native Hawaiian and Pacific Islander, 0.7% from some other race, and 3.7% from two or more races. Hispanic or Latino residents of any race comprised 3.3% of the population.

0.0% of residents lived in urban areas, while 100.0% lived in rural areas.

There were 2,427 households in the county, of which 32.4% had children under the age of 18 living with them and 18.2% had a female householder with no spouse or partner present. About 24.9% of all households were made up of individuals and 12.5% had someone living alone who was 65 years of age or older.

There were 3,849 housing units, of which 36.9% were vacant. Among occupied housing units, 81.3% were owner-occupied and 18.7% were renter-occupied. The homeowner vacancy rate was 1.3% and the rental vacancy rate was 9.4%.

=== 2010 census ===
As of the 2010 United States census, there were 5,986 people, 2,281 households, and 1,661 families in the county. The population density was 6.1 inhabitants per square mile (2.4/km^{2}). There were 3,914 housing units at an average density of 4.0 per square mile (1.5/km^{2}). The racial makeup of the county was 96.3% white, 0.5% American Indian, 0.4% Asian, 0.1% black or African American, 1.6% from other races, and 1.1% from two or more races. Those of Hispanic or Latino origin made up 3.6% of the population. In terms of ancestry, 37.1% were English, 10.2% were German, 8.0% were American, and 7.6% were Danish.

Of the 2,281 households, 32.4% had children under the age of 18 living with them, 63.3% were married couples living together, 6.3% had a female householder with no husband present, 27.2% were non-families, and 24.0% of all households were made up of individuals. The average household size was 2.61 and the average family size was 3.12. The median age was 40.5 years.

The median income for a household in the county was $43,374 and the median income for a family was $47,092. Males had a median income of $39,023 versus $26,417 for females. The per capita income for the county was $19,284. About 11.2% of families and 13.9% of the population were below the poverty line, including 14.1% of those under age 18 and 12.0% of those age 65 or over.

=== 2000 census ===
As of the 2000 United States census, there were 6,411 people, 2,259 households, and 1,710 families in the county. The population density was 7 people per square mile (2.7 people/km^{2}). There were 3,268 housing units at an average density of 3 per square mile (1.2/km^{2}). The racial makeup of the county was 97.66% White, 0.09% Black or African American, 0.53% Native American, 0.08% Asian, 0.05% Pacific Islander, 1.08% from other races, and 0.51% from two or more races. 2.40% of the population were Hispanic or Latino of any race. 28.6% were of English, 16.1% American, 9.4% German, 7.1% Danish, 6.2% Swiss and 5.5% Swedish ancestry.

There were 2,259 households, out of which 38.80% had children under the age of 18 living with them, 66.90% were married couples living together, 6.40% had a female householder with no husband present, and 24.30% were non-families. 22.20% of all households were made up of individuals, and 12.10% had someone living alone who was 65 years of age or older. The average household size was 2.81 and the average family size was 3.33.

The county population contained 33.00% under the age of 18, 7.40% from 18 to 24, 22.40% from 25 to 44, 21.70% from 45 to 64, and 15.60% who were 65 years of age or older. The median age was 36 years. For every 100 females there were 98.40 males. For every 100 females age 18 and over, there were 96.70 males.

The median income for a household in the county was $32,162, and the median income for a family was $38,351. Males had a median income of $33,958 versus $17,829 for females. The per capita income for the county was $13,592. About 7.10% of families and 9.60% of the population were below the poverty line, including 11.30% of those under age 18 and 9.20% of those age 65 or over.

== Communities ==
=== Cities ===
- Bloomington
- Georgetown
- Montpelier
- Paris
- St. Charles

=== Census-designated place ===
- Bennington

=== Unincorporated communities ===
- Alton
- Bern
- Dingle
- Fish Haven
- Geneva
- Glencoe
- Liberty
- Nounan
- Ovid
- Pegram
- Raymond
- Wardboro
- Wooleys

== Government and politics ==
=== Government ===
==== County Commissioners ====
| Office | Name | Party |
|---|---|---|
| 1st County Commissioner District | Alan Eborn | Republican |
| 2nd County Commissioner District | Rex Payne | Republican |
| 3rd County Commissioner District | Wynn Olsen | Republican |

==== County Offices ====
| Office | Name | Party |
|---|---|---|
| Sheriff | Bart Heslington | Republican |
| Assessor | Janelle Jensen | Republican |
| Clerk | Amy Bishop | Republican |
| Coroner | Chad Walker | Republican |
| Treasurer | Tricia Poulsen | Republican |

=== Politics ===
Bear Lake County has historically been one of the most reliably Republican counties in Idaho, only voting for two Democratic candidates (Franklin D. Roosevelt and Lyndon B. Johnson) in the past century, all of whom carried the state of Idaho in landslide national victories. Before the Great Depression, Bear Lake was a swing county, switching between Democrats and Republicans until it solidified itself as a Republican stronghold during the 20th century. Bear Lake, along with the rest of Southeast Idaho, have long been one of the strongest Republican areas in a state that is already overwhelmingly Republican, something that can be attributed to the region's extremely high Mormon population. Bear Lake County is nearly 90% Mormon, one of the most strongly Republican demographics in the country. As Mormons continue to shift to the right, Bear Lake in the 21st century has continuously given Republicans nearly 90% of the vote (notably aside from 2016, when Republican candidate Donald Trump performed poorly with Mormons and Mormon third-party candidate Evan McMullin, from neighboring Utah, obtained a substantial percentage of the vote in heavily Mormon areas).

Bear Lake County's Republican dominance holds true at the local level as well, with Republicans in local office frequently going unchallenged for election. Bear Lake County is represented in the United States Congress by senators Mike Crapo and Jim Risch, both Republicans, as well as Republican Mike Simpson, representative for Idaho's 2nd congressional district. At the state level, Bear Lake County is part of Idaho's 35th legislative district, represented by senator Van Burtenshaw and representatives Karey Hanks and Rod Furniss, all Republicans.

United States presidential election results for Bear Lake County, Idaho
| Year | Republican | | Democratic | | Third party(ies) | |
| Year | No. | % | No. | % | No. | % |
|---|---|---|---|---|---|---|
| 1892 | 114 | 33.93% | 0 | 0.00% | 222 | 66.07% |
| 1896 | 249 | 22.62% | 851 | 77.29% | 1 | 0.09% |
| 1900 | 1,055 | 49.48% | 1,077 | 50.52% | 0 | 0.00% |
| 1904 | 1,538 | 66.26% | 769 | 33.13% | 14 | 0.60% |
| 1908 | 1,460 | 60.43% | 933 | 38.62% | 23 | 0.95% |
| 1912 | 1,271 | 50.96% | 916 | 36.73% | 307 | 12.31% |
| 1916 | 1,229 | 43.44% | 1,566 | 55.36% | 34 | 1.20% |
| 1920 | 1,831 | 61.67% | 1,138 | 38.33% | 0 | 0.00% |
| 1924 | 1,611 | 54.19% | 881 | 29.63% | 481 | 16.18% |
| 1928 | 1,802 | 60.98% | 1,146 | 38.78% | 7 | 0.24% |
| 1932 | 1,785 | 50.87% | 1,721 | 49.05% | 3 | 0.09% |
| 1936 | 1,404 | 40.28% | 2,078 | 59.61% | 4 | 0.11% |
| 1940 | 1,761 | 46.50% | 2,026 | 53.50% | 0 | 0.00% |
| 1944 | 1,613 | 48.19% | 1,732 | 51.75% | 2 | 0.06% |
| 1948 | 1,590 | 48.48% | 1,664 | 50.73% | 26 | 0.79% |
| 1952 | 2,300 | 64.35% | 1,274 | 35.65% | 0 | 0.00% |
| 1956 | 2,181 | 64.17% | 1,218 | 35.83% | 0 | 0.00% |
| 1960 | 1,963 | 55.67% | 1,563 | 44.33% | 0 | 0.00% |
| 1964 | 1,409 | 43.14% | 1,857 | 56.86% | 0 | 0.00% |
| 1968 | 1,866 | 60.17% | 1,058 | 34.12% | 177 | 5.71% |
| 1972 | 2,213 | 69.48% | 716 | 22.48% | 256 | 8.04% |
| 1976 | 2,094 | 66.60% | 960 | 30.53% | 90 | 2.86% |
| 1980 | 2,941 | 82.45% | 508 | 14.24% | 118 | 3.31% |
| 1984 | 2,760 | 84.48% | 481 | 14.72% | 26 | 0.80% |
| 1988 | 2,084 | 69.93% | 867 | 29.09% | 29 | 0.97% |
| 1992 | 1,419 | 49.72% | 562 | 19.69% | 873 | 30.59% |
| 1996 | 1,583 | 56.37% | 805 | 28.67% | 420 | 14.96% |
| 2000 | 2,296 | 79.20% | 517 | 17.83% | 86 | 2.97% |
| 2004 | 2,506 | 82.43% | 494 | 16.25% | 40 | 1.32% |
| 2008 | 2,377 | 80.77% | 502 | 17.06% | 64 | 2.17% |
| 2012 | 2,489 | 88.20% | 302 | 10.70% | 31 | 1.10% |
| 2016 | 2,203 | 75.24% | 255 | 8.71% | 470 | 16.05% |
| 2020 | 2,914 | 87.88% | 350 | 10.55% | 52 | 1.57% |
| 2024 | 2,908 | 87.46% | 346 | 10.41% | 71 | 2.14% |

== See also ==
- Black Bear Resort
- List of counties in Idaho
- National Register of Historic Places listings in Bear Lake County, Idaho
