= Joseph C. Rich =

American politician

Member of the Idaho Senate from the Bear Lake County district
- In office 1896–1898

Personal details
- Born: January 16, 1841 Nauvoo, Illinois, U.S.
- Died: October 17, 1908 (aged 67) Centerville, Utah, U.S.
- Resting place: Paris Cemetery; Paris, Idaho, U.S.
- Spouse: Ann Eliza Hunter (m. 1886)
- Relations: Charles C. Rich (father); Edward Hunter (father-in-law)

Joseph Coulson Rich (January 16, 1841 – October 17, 1908) was an American, politician, judge, and early settler of the Idaho Territory.

== Early life ==
Rich was born in Nauvoo, Illinois, as the oldest son of the Latter Day Saint converts Charles C. Rich and Sarah DeArmon Pea. In 1847, the family traveled with Mormon pioneers from Nauvoo to the Salt Lake Valley. In 1849, Charles Rich became an apostle of the Church of Jesus Christ of Latter-day Saints (LDS Church).

== Career ==
In 1860, Rich traveled to England and Wales, where he was a missionary for the LDS Church until 1863. During that time, his father was the president of the LDS Church's European Mission, which was based in England. Returning to Salt Lake City, Charles and Joseph Rich were recruited by Brigham Young to participate in the settlement of the Bear River Valley in Idaho Territory. Under the leadership of Charles Rich, the settlers founded Paris, Idaho. On January 25, 1867, Joseph Rich became a member of the Council of Fifty.

In 1868, Rich wrote an article in the Deseret News in which he claimed that a group of settlers had seen "monsters" swimming in the waters of Bear Lake. This was the beginning of the popular legend that the Bear Lake Monster inhabits the lake.

A Democrat, Rich was twice elected to represent Bear Lake County in the Idaho Territorial Legislature. He also served as prosecuting attorney of the county. He presided over the Democratic Party's Idaho state convention in 1894 and was elected to the Idaho Senate in 1896. In 1898, he was elected as the judge of Idaho's fifth judicial district.

== Personal life ==
In 1886, Rich married Ann Eliza Hunter, a daughter of Edward Hunter, a prominent leader in the LDS Church. Rich died in Centerville, Utah, and was buried in the Paris Cemetery in Paris, Idaho.
