= Out of the Blue (sculpture) =

2022 artwork in Salt Lake City, Utah, U.S.

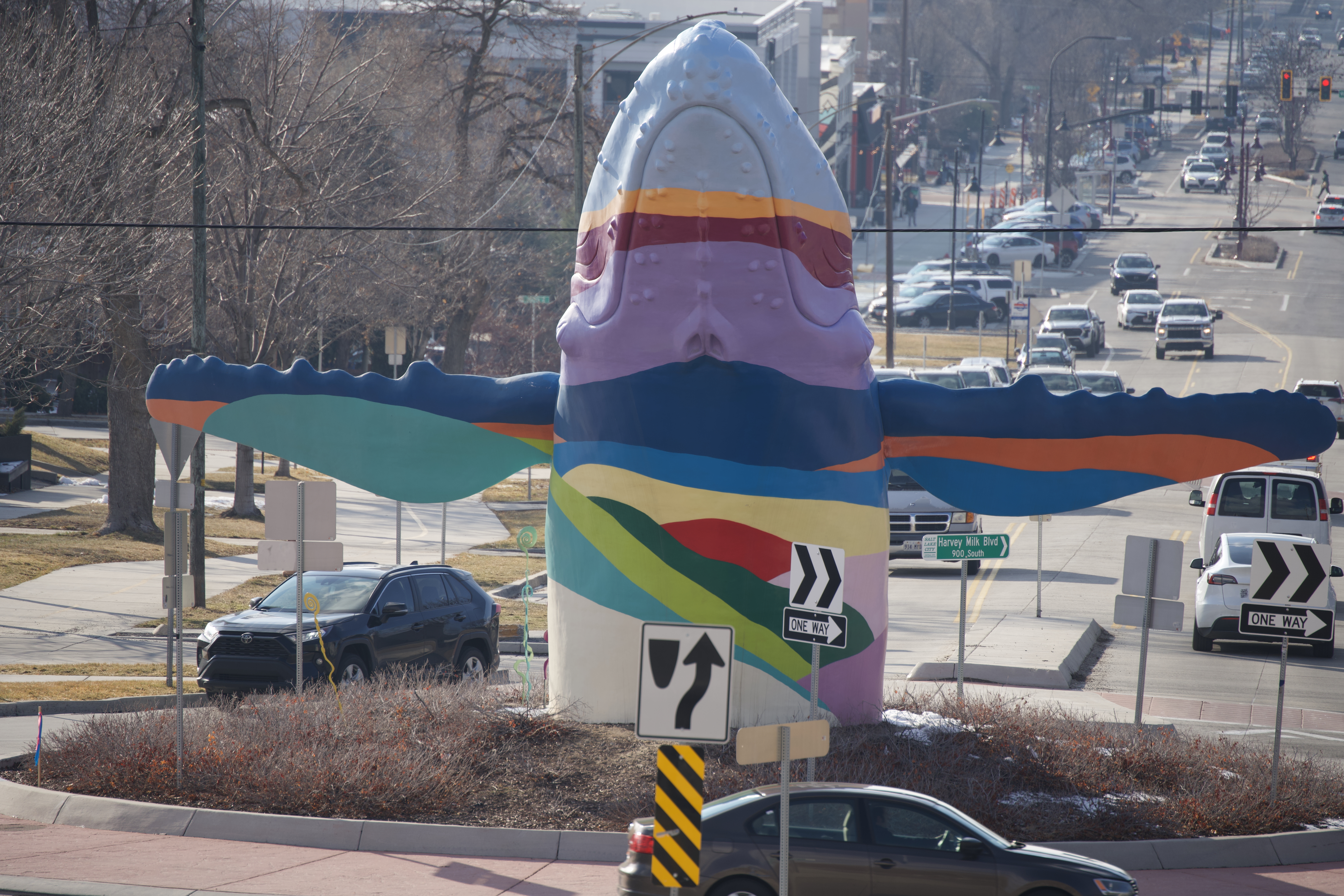
- Out of the Blue in 2025
- Year: 2022
- Medium: Fiberglass and steel sculpture
- Dimensions: 7.0 m (23 ft)
- Location: Salt Lake City, Utah, United States; 40°44′59″N 111°51′34″W

Out of the Blue is a public art installation located at the intersection of 900 S and 1100 E in Salt Lake City, Utah, United States. Situated in the middle of a roundabout, the sculpture depicts the top-half of a breaching humpback whale painted in multiple vibrant colors. The structure is locally referred to as "The 9th and 9th Whale". It was designed by Stephen Kesler and created with help from the Salt Lake City Public Arts Program who say the sculpture is "...designed to complement and augment the unique and welcoming identity of the 9th and 9th area."

== Design ==
The whale sculpture consists of a steel skeleton encased in fiberglass.

According to the Salt Lake City Arts Council, every 3–5 years a new artist or artist led team will be commissioned to repaint the whale to represent the ever-changing neighborhood. As of April 2022, Out of the Blue is painted with the mural Point of Reference by local artist Michael Murdock. Murdock worked at Caffé Expresso, a local coffee shop located on the roundabout where Out of the Blue is located. The mural is inspired by the sunrises and sunsets experienced in the neighborhood.

== History ==
In 2018, Salt Lake City's Department of Transportation finished construction on a roundabout in the 9th and 9th neighborhood with mixed reception from community members. The middle of the roundabout was originally a simple wood chip-covered mound. Quickly after its completion, local community members began to decorate the roundabout with garden gnomes as a symbol of the community.

In February 2021, the Salt Lake City Art Design Board approved the installation of the humpback whale sculpture, designed by local artist Stephen Kesler. Many community members expressed frustration at the removal of the community-created gnome installation. However, construction of the sculpture continued. In July 2021, a human-sized gnome with cheetah print boots was placed on the mound, holding the sign "Whales belong in the Ocean".

Out of the Blue was originally unveiled on April 11, 2022. A small ribbon cutting ceremony was held to honor the occasion. During the ceremony, current Salt Lake City Mayor Erin Mendenhall said, "public art can be this lens for culture and to reflect on our values as a community."

In the year after the installation of the sculpture, its presence became a cult phenomenon in the area. Reddit users in the subreddit r/SaltLakeCity began to refer to the sculpture as the "Sacred Whale". A satirical website for the religious organization "The Church of the Sacred Whale of Ninth and Ninth", sells merchandise related to the sculpture. However, the original artist of the sculpture has denounced the website, citing concerns about the AI generated artwork and text present. Residents of Salt Lake City have also created versions of the Utah State Flag depicting the whale in the middle instead of the traditional beehive. LGBTQ+ Pride flags featuring the whale can also be found around the area.

In October 2023, four runners decided to run a marathon around the art installation. Runners Wyn Barnett, Jackson Bradshaw, Evan Service and Caleb Leftwich ran a total of 632 laps around the whale, running a total of 26.2 miles (42.2 km). Since the original Whalathon, over 50 people have completed a marathon around the sculpture.

Erin Mendenhall, the mayor of Salt Lake City, gifted a miniature replica of the sculpture to the leaders of Matsumoto, Nagano, one of Salt Lake City's sister cities, in November 2024.

== Culture ==
As previously mentioned, with the installation of the Whale in 2022 came a cult phenomenon. This was due to many believing that the Whale was responsible for the massive snow season of 22-23, with over 900 inches of snow over the course of the winter, the largest season on record ever. No season had seen over 800 inches since 1982, when there was over 850 inches of snow. The spring runoff as a result of this was so extreme it backed up the systems that were previously in place to mitigate this, and the Salt Lake City Main Street had to be flooded as a result of this. Furthermore, a picture of an avalanche in Little Cottonwood Canyon was taken in such a way that some realized that it was in the general shape of a whale. Many merchandise items were created and sold, notably flags, T-Shirts, stickers, and hoodies. A common slogan printed on them is "All Hail the Whale," and many say that the Whale will bring back the water of the Great Salt Lake, which has all but dried up in recent decades.

In early July 2026, a miniature replica created by Michael Clafin of the whale was left underneath the big whale. One person came to the 9th & 9th neighborhood to write a small message in chalk, calling it a "miracle." Another person wrote online "It's the baby we didn't know we needed, but somehow will bring us closer together."

== See also ==
Great Salt Lake whale hoax
