= St. Charles, Idaho =

- City
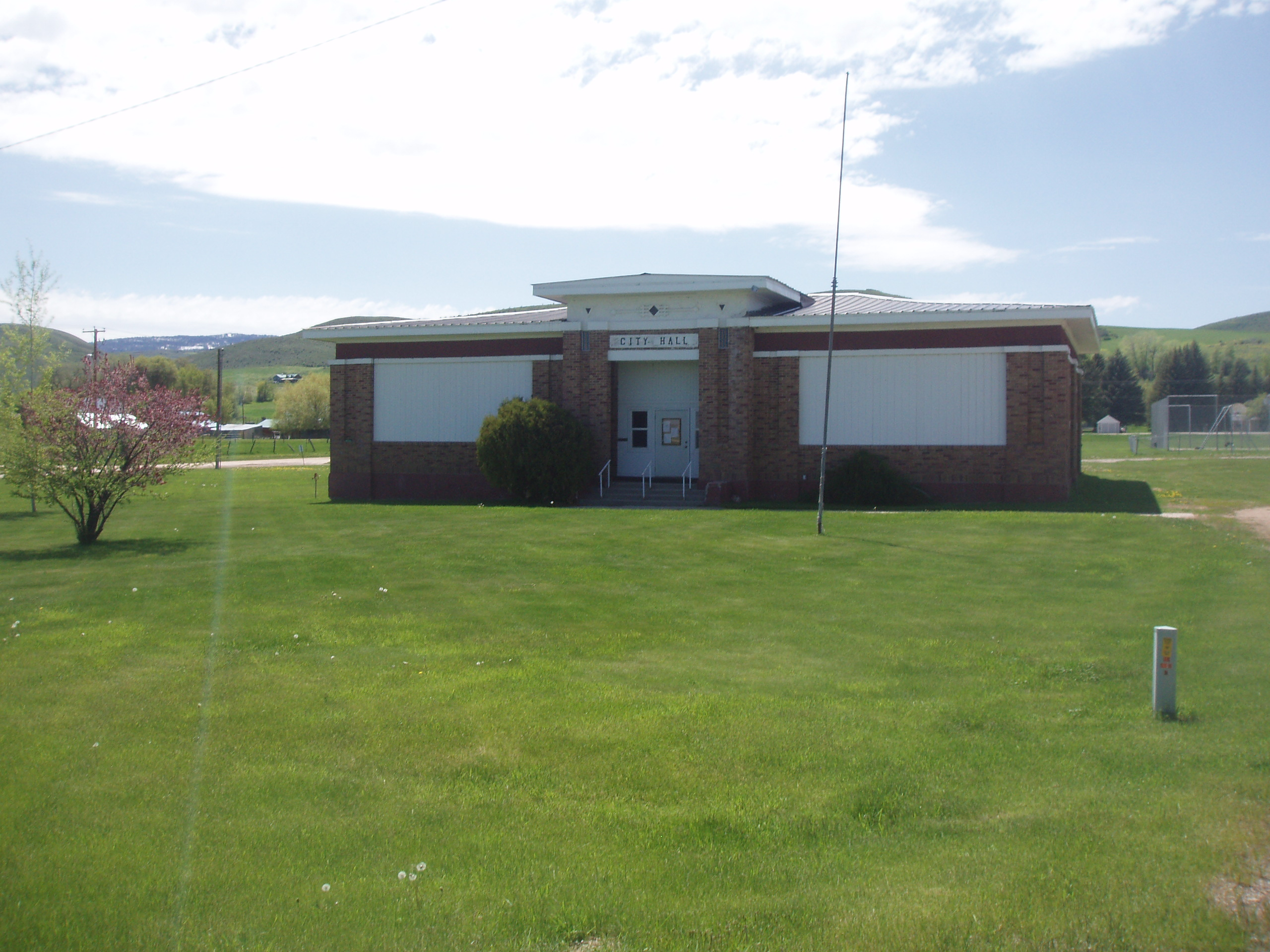
- St. Charles Town Hall, June 2011

- Location of St. Charles in Bear Lake County, Idaho.

- Location of St. Charles St. Charles, Idaho (the United States)
- Coordinates: 42°07′12″N 111°23′28″W
- Country: United States
- State: Idaho
- County: Bear Lake

Area
  - Total: 0.73 sq mi (1.90 km^{2})
  - Land: 0.73 sq mi (1.90 km^{2})
  - Water: 0 sq mi (0.00 km^{2})
- Elevation: 5,962 ft (1,817 m)

Population (2020)
  - Total: 161
  - Density: 219/sq mi (84.7/km^{2})
- Time zone: UTC-7 (Mountain (MST))
  - Summer (DST): UTC-6 (MDT)
- Area codes: 208, 986
- FIPS code: 16-71110
- GNIS feature ID: 2411756
- Website: stcharlesidaho.weebly.com

St. Charles or Saint Charles is a city in southern Bear Lake County, Idaho, United States, that is located near the northwestern shore of Bear Lake. Its population was 161 at the 2020 census, up from 131 in 2010.

== Description ==
Ranching and recreation are the major influences on the community. Its small population live in houses scattered through a number of blocks of rustic streets interspersed with fields and agricultural buildings. A number of summer homes for visitors to the lake have added to the community. St. Charles sits at the mouth of St. Charles Canyon, a scenic inlet into the neighboring mountains, where hiking and camping opportunities are available.

== History ==
St. Charles was settled in May 1864 by Mormon pioneers. As did most Mormon communities along the Idaho–Utah border, early settlers believed they were in the Territory of Utah. In 1864, the Utah territorial legislature created Richland County (shortened to Rich in 1868) for the Bear Lake Valley settlements, designating St. Charles as its county seat. The 1870 Decennial Census of the United States listed St. Charles and 10 other Idaho Bear Lake Valley settlements under Rich County, Utah.

But when the official survey of the Idaho–Utah line was completed on February 15, 1872, it placed St. Charles and the rest of the northern Bear Lake Valley settlements in Oneida County, Idaho Territory.

The area developed as an agricultural community, and the population was never substantial. In the 20th century it began to attract tourists and persons seeking a recreation area. Some second homes and retirement homes have been built here, but the population has declined.

== Notable residents ==
Sculptor Gutzon Borglum (1867–1941) was born in St. Charles to Danish immigrant parents. He is best known for his sculptured portraits of American presidents carved in the stone of Mount Rushmore.

== Geography ==
According to the United States Census Bureau, the city has a total area of 0.63 square miles (1.63 km^{2}), all of it land.

== Demographics ==
Historical population
Census	Pop.	Note	%±
1940	429		—
1950	363		−15.4%
1960	300		−17.4%
1970	200		−33.3%
1980	211		5.5%
1990	189		−10.4%
2000	156		−17.5%
2010	131		−16.0%
2020	161		22.9%
U.S. Decennial Census

=== 2010 census ===
At the 2010 census there were 131 people in 53 households, including 35 families, in the city. The population density was 207.9 inhabitants per square mile (80.3/km^{2}). There were 138 housing units at an average density of 219.0 per square mile (84.6/km^{2}). The racial makeup of the city was 98.5% White and 1.5% from two or more races.

Of the 53 households 26.4% had children under the age of 18 living with them, 58.5% were married couples living together, 7.5% had a female householder with no husband present, and 34.0% were non-families. 32.1% of households were one person and 13.2% were one person aged 65 or older. The average household size was 2.47 and the average family size was 3.17.

The median age was 42.8 years. 29.8% of residents were under the age of 18; 3.1% were between the ages of 18 and 24; 19.1% were from 25 to 44; 26.8% were from 45 to 64; and 21.4% were 65 or older. The gender makeup of the city was 49.6% male and 50.4% female.

=== 2000 census ===
At the 2000 census there were 156 people in 57 households, including 44 families, in the city. The population density was 244.9 inhabitants per square mile (94.6/km^{2}). There were 106 housing units at an average density of 166.4 per square mile (64.2/km^{2}). The racial makeup of the city was 98.08% White, 1.28% Native American, 0.64% from other races. Hispanic or Latino of any race were 1.92%.

Of the 57 households 31.6% had children under the age of 18 living with them, 77.2% were married couples living together, and 22.8% were non-families. 19.3% of households were one person and 17.5% were one person aged 65 or older. The average household size was 2.74 and the average family size was 3.16.

The age distribution was 29.5% under the age of 18, 1.9% from 18 to 24, 19.2% from 25 to 44, 21.2% from 45 to 64, and 28.2% 65 or older. The median age was 45 years. For every 100 females, there were 102.6 males. For every 100 females age 18 and over, there were 96.4 males.

The median household income was $21,923 and the median family income was $27,500. Males had a median income of $25,500 versus $31,250 for females. The per capita income for the city was $11,755. About 10.9% of families and 7.3% of the population were below the poverty line, including none of those under the age of eighteen and 11.5% of those sixty five or over.

== Highway ==
- - U.S. Route 89, to Paris, Montpelier (north) and Logan, Utah (southwest)

== See also ==
- List of cities in Idaho
