= Wardboro, Idaho =

Unincorporated community in the state of Idaho, United States

Wardboro
- Unincorporated community
- Location within the state of Idaho
- Coordinates: 42°15′21″N 111°16′38″W
- Country: United States
- State: Idaho
- County: Bear Lake
- Elevation: 5,952 ft (1,814 m)
- Time zone: UTC-7 (Mountain (MST))
  - Summer (DST): UTC-6 (MDT)
- GNIS feature ID: 392830

Wardboro (formerly Preston) is an unincorporated community in Bear Lake County, Idaho.

Wardboro was originally called Preston, after early founder Thomas Preston, and under the latter name was founded in 1865 although that name was probably not applied until 1968. This name could not be kept when the U.S. Postal Service rejected is as there was already a Preston in Franklin County.

The present name is after Wardsboro, Vermont, the native home of a share of the early settlers. Other names proposed included Heepsville (after the daughter of William and Sophia Heap who had died in a blizzard), Prestonville, Greensborough, Troy and Dalrymple Dell. Oscar Dalrymple's of naming the town after his hometown of Wardboro won the day. A rumor subsequently arose that the town was named after its first postmaster, Milton Ward.
