= Pegram, Idaho =

Unincorporated community in the state of Idaho, United States

Pegram
- Unincorporated community
- Location within the state of Idaho
- Coordinates: 42°08′34″N 111°07′44″W
- Country: United States
- State: Idaho
- County: Bear Lake
- Elevation: 6,033 ft (1,839 m)
- Time zone: UTC-7 (Mountain (MST))
  - Summer (DST): UTC-6 (MDT)
- GNIS feature ID: 397021

Pegram is an unincorporated community in Bear Lake County, Idaho.
