= Bear Lake Monster =

Mythical creature in Bear Lake on the Utah–Idaho border

Creature information
- Other name: Isabella
- Sub grouping: Lake monster
- Similar entities: North Shore Monster, Utah Lake Monster, Moon Lake Monster, Loch Ness Monster, Champ

Origin
- First attested: July 1868
- Country: United States
- Region: Bear Lake, Utah and Idaho
- Habitat: Water
- Details: Serpentine body, often described as having legs or being able to travel on land.

Location of Bear Lake in Utah

The Bear Lake Monster is a lake monster urban legend which appears in folklore near Bear Lake, on the Utah–Idaho border.

The myth originally grew from articles written in the 19th century by Joseph C. Rich, a Mormon settler in the area, purporting to report second-hand accounts of sightings of the creature. However, he later recanted the stories.

In recent years, the monster has been considered a tourist attraction. The last reported sighting of the monster was in 2002.

== Descriptions ==
Not all descriptions of the Bear Lake Monster agree, but one team of folklorists stated that it "is reported to resemble a serpent, but with legs about eighteen inches [46 cm] long on which it marauds along the shoreline." One article reported that the creature had "a large undulating body, with about 30 ft (9.1 m) of exposed surface, of a light cream color, moving swiftly through the water, at a distance of three miles from the point of observation."

Others reported seeing a monster-like creature which went faster than a locomotive and had a head variously described as being similar to that of a cow, otter, crocodile or a walrus (minus the tusks). Its size was reported to be at least 50 ft (15 m) long, and certainly not less than 40 ft (12 m). Some have reported spikes along its spine, starting from the bottom of the head all the way along its body. Some sightings even spoke of a second member of the species and smaller monsters as well.

== History ==
An 1868 article in the Deseret News announced that "The Indians have a tradition concerning a strange, serpent-like creature inhabiting the waters of Bear Lake… Now, it seems this water devil, as the Indians called it, has again made an appearance. A number of our white settlers declare they have seen it with their own eyes. This Bear Lake Monster, they now call it, is causing a great deal of excitement up here." The author, Joseph C. Rich, went on to relate several sightings of the creature in recent times. The article created a stir in Salt Lake City, and within a month "a news staff member… quizzed many Bear Lake people and found hardly a person who doubted it."

Leaders of the Mormon church took an interest in the monster. When they visited the area on preaching tours, they spoke with residents of the region. They stated that they "had a conversation with brother Charles C. Rich and other brethren from Bear Lake Valley, respecting the monster which has been seen in the lake" and found that they declared that the testimony that had been given "by so many individuals, who have seen these creatures in so many places and under a variety of circumstances" that they (the locals) considered the story to be "indisputable". The Deseret News continued to publish articles about the monster—skeptically at times and defensively at others—while other local newspapers turned to attack the stories of a water devil. The Salt Lake Tribune even went as far as to quip that the Monster was "twin brother to the devil and cousin to Brigham".

In 1874, LDS bishop William Budge wrote a letter to the editor of the Ogden Junction newspaper, saying he and two friends had seen the monster, which he described as about 5 to 6 ft (1.5 to 1.8 m) long: "Its face and part of its head were distinctly seen, covered in fur, or short hair of a light snuff color. The face of the animal was flat, very wide between the eyes, and tapering to the nose, with very full, large, blue eyes and prominent ears, the ears resembling those of a horse, but scarcely as long. The whole face in shape was like that of a fox, but so large that the space between the eyes equaled that of the distance between the eyes of a common cow. It did not look ferocious and was in no hurry to go ..."

Articles about the Bear Lake Monster continued to appear over the next several years, either reciting new sightings of the Bear Lake Monster as well as similar creatures in other rivers and lakes in the Utah Territory or calling the sightings into question. The number of alleged appearances of lake monsters all across northern Utah caused some people to speculate that there was an underground channel connecting the Great Salt Lake and other waterways to Bear Lake. Interest was high enough that at one point even LDS Church president Brigham Young decided to investigate the claims to find out whether the story was "an honest tale of a serpent or only a fish story" and went as far as sending a large rope to Paris, Idaho to aid in capturing the monster.

Young was not the only person interested in capturing the creature. One resident proposed using a large baited hook attached to a 20 ft (6.1 m) cable and 300 yd (270 m) of 1 in (2.5 cm) rope, at the end of which was a to be a large buoy with a flagstaff inserted and an anchor to keep it in a perpendicular position. From the buoy, 100 yd (91 m) of 0.75 in (1.9 cm) rope was to be extended to a tree onshore. When captured, it was hoped that the monster could be exploited for its wondrous proportions in the show business, in competition with the famous P. T. Barnum.

Interest in the subject eventually died down, and the phenomenon faded from public memory. Twenty-six years following his articles and allegations, Joseph C. Rich finally admitted that it had all been a "wonderful first-class lie".

== Modern Bear Lake Monster sightings ==
Sightings of the Bear Lake Monster continued even after Rich admitted that he fabricated the original sightings as a hoax. A 1907 letter published in a Logan, Utah newspaper claimed that two men had seen the Bear Lake behemoth attack their camp and kill one of their horses, a four-year-old claimed to see it in 1937, and a Boy Scout leader spoke of seeing it in 1946. The last reported sighting of the monster was in June 2002, when Bear Lake business owner Brian Hirschi claimed to have seen the monster.

The monster has become a part of local folklore, partly due to sporadic sightings and partly in jest. For years, a Bear Lake Monster Boat—a tourist boat, shaped to look like a green lake monster—offered a 45-minute scenic cruise of Bear Lake with folklore storytelling. Another self-parody that the locals have done is to fill a float in the Garden City, Utah, Raspberry Days parade with local children and label it "The Real Bear Lake Monsters". On another occasion, during the 1996 Raspberry Days, a competition was organized in Garden City to have local school children name the leviathan. The judges decided on the name Isabella, which had been submitted by an eight-year-old girl.

== See also ==
- Great Salt Lake whale hoax
- North Shore Monster
- Moon Lake Monster
- Utah Lake Monster
