= Bloomington, Idaho =

Bloomington
- City
- Location of Bloomington in Bear Lake County, Idaho.
- Coordinates: 42°11′27″N 111°24′15″W
- Country: United States
- State: Idaho
- County: Bear Lake

Area
  - Total: 0.95 sq mi (2.47 km^{2})
  - Land: 0.95 sq mi (2.47 km^{2})
  - Water: 0 sq mi (0.00 km^{2})
- Elevation: 5,981 ft (1,823 m)

Population (2020)
  - Total: 199
  - Density: 209/sq mi (80.6/km^{2})
- Time zone: UTC-7 (Mountain (MST))
  - Summer (DST): UTC-6 (MDT)
- ZIP code: 83223
- Area codes: 208, 986
- FIPS code: 16-08560
- GNIS feature ID: 2409866
- Website: bloomingtonidaho.net

Bloomington is a city in Bear Lake County, Idaho, United States. The population was 199 at the 2020 census. It was first settled in 1864.

== Geography ==
According to the United States Census Bureau, the city has a total area of 0.90 square miles (2.33 km^{2}), all of it land.

== Demographics ==
Historical population
Census	Pop.	Note	%±
1910	539		—
1920	475		−11.9%
1930	393		−17.3%
1940	418		6.4%
1950	302		−27.8%
1960	254		−15.9%
1970	186		−26.8%
1980	212		14.0%
1990	197		−7.1%
2000	251		27.4%
2010	206		−17.9%
2020	199		−3.4%
U.S. Decennial Census

=== 2010 census ===
As of the census of 2010, there were 206 people, 74 households, and 57 families residing in the city. The population density was 228.9 inhabitants per square mile (88.4/km^{2}). There were 120 housing units at an average density of 133.3 per square mile (51.5/km^{2}). The racial makeup of the city was 88.8% White, 2.9% Native American, 2.4% Asian, 4.9% from other races, and 1.0% from two or more races. Hispanic or Latino of any race were 8.3% of the population.

There were 74 households, of which 32.4% had children under the age of 18 living with them, 70.3% were married couples living together, 4.1% had a female householder with no husband present, 2.7% had a male householder with no wife present, and 23.0% were non-families. 21.6% of all households were made up of individuals, and 10.9% had someone living alone who was 65 years of age or older. The average household size was 2.78 and the average family size was 3.28.

The median age in the city was 46.5 years. 26.2% of residents were under the age of 18; 6.9% were between the ages of 18 and 24; 15.1% were from 25 to 44; 32.5% were from 45 to 64; and 19.4% were 65 years of age or older. The gender makeup of the city was 53.9% male and 46.1% female.

=== 2000 census ===
As of the census of 2000, there were 251 people, 81 households, and 66 families residing in the city. The population density was 281.5 inhabitants per square mile (108.7/km^{2}). There were 111 housing units at an average density of 124.5 per square mile (48.1/km^{2}). The racial makeup of the city was 97.21% White and 2.79% Native American. Hispanic or Latino of any race were 2.39% of the population.

There were 81 households, out of which 39.5% had children under the age of 18 living with them, 72.8% were married couples living together, 7.4% had a female householder with no husband present, and 18.5% were non-families. 17.3% of all households were made up of individuals, and 8.6% had someone living alone who was 65 years of age or older. The average household size was 3.10 and the average family size was 3.53.

In the city, the population was spread out, with 38.6% under the age of 18, 4.0% from 18 to 24, 22.3% from 25 to 44, 20.3% from 45 to 64, and 14.7% who were 65 years of age or older. The median age was 34 years. For every 100 females, there were 105.7 males. For every 100 females age 18 and over, there were 100.0 males.

The median income for a household in the city was $34,750, and the median income for a family was $40,625. Males had a median income of $33,125 versus $13,750 for females. The per capita income for the city was $13,866. About 4.2% of families and 2.8% of the population were below the poverty line, including none of those under the age of eighteen or sixty five or over.

== See also ==
- List of cities in Idaho
