= Georgetown, Idaho =

- City
- Location of Georgetown in Bear Lake County, Idaho.
- Coordinates: 42°28′46″N 111°22′14″W
- Country: United States
- State: Idaho
- County: Bear Lake

Area
  - Total: 0.68 sq mi (1.76 km^{2})
  - Land: 0.68 sq mi (1.76 km^{2})
  - Water: 0 sq mi (0.00 km^{2})
- Elevation: 6,040 ft (1,840 m)

Population (2020)
  - Total: 503
  - Density: 740/sq mi (286/km^{2})
- Time zone: UTC-7 (Mountain (MST))
  - Summer (DST): UTC-6 (MDT)
- ZIP code: 83239
- Area codes: 208, 986
- FIPS code: 16-30340
- GNIS feature ID: 2410583
- Website: georgetown.id.gov

Georgetown is a city in the Bear River Valley in Bear Lake County, Idaho, United States, at the center of a farming area between the river and the mountains to the east. It was settled by Mormon pioneers on the route of the Oregon Trail and was named after George Q. Cannon. Georgetown was first settled in 1864. The population was 503 at the 2020 census. U.S. Route 30 passes through the town.

== Geography ==
According to the United States Census Bureau, the city has a total area of 0.75 square miles (1.94 km^{2}), all of it land.

== Demographics ==
Historical population
Census	Pop.	Note	%±
1880	134		—
1890	412		207.5%
1910	410		—
1920	456		11.2%
1930	391		−14.3%
1940	463		18.4%
1950	404		−12.7%
1960	551		36.4%
1970	421		−23.6%
1980	544		29.2%
1990	558		2.6%
2000	538		−3.6%
2010	476		−11.5%
2020	503		5.7%
U.S. Decennial Census

=== 2010 census ===
As of the census of 2010, there were 476 people, 170 households, and 137 families residing in the city. The population density was 634.7 inhabitants per square mile (245.1/km^{2}). There were 194 housing units at an average density of 258.7 units per square mile (99.9 units/km^{2}). The racial makeup of the city was 95.4% White, 0.4% African American, 0.4% Native American, 0.6% Asian, 0.4% from other races, and 2.7% from two or more races. Hispanic or Latino of any race were 0.4% of the population.

There were 170 households, of which 38.8% had children under the age of 18 living with them, 67.6% were married couples living together, 9.4% had a female householder with no husband present, 3.5% had a male householder with no wife present, and 19.4% were non-families. 17.1% of all households were made up of individuals, and 11.2% had someone living alone who was 65 years of age or older. The average household size was 2.80, and the average family size was 3.14.

The median age in the city was 37.3 years. 26.5% of residents were under the age of 18; 10.7% were between the ages of 18 and 24; 21.5% were from 25 to 44; 25% were from 45 to 64; and 16.4% were 65 years of age or older. The gender makeup of the city was 46.4% male and 53.6% female.

=== 2000 census ===
As of the census of 2000, there were 538 people, 182 households, and 147 families residing in the city. The population density was 801.6 people per square mile (309.5/km^{2}). There were 200 housing units at an average density of 298.0 per square mile (115.1/km^{2}). The racial makeup of the city was 97.77% White, 0.19% African American, 1.12% Native American, 0.19% Pacific Islander, 0.37% from other races, and 0.37% from two or more races. Hispanic or Latino of any race were 1.67% of the population.

There were 182 households, out of which 45.6% had children under the age of 18 living with them, 75.3% were married couples living together, 4.9% had a female householder with no husband present, and 19.2% were non-families. 17.0% of all households were made up of individuals, and 8.2% had someone living alone who was 65 years of age or older. The average household size was 2.96, and the average family size was 3.35.

In the city, the population was spread out, with 34.6% under the age of 18, 7.8% from 18 to 24, 24.9% from 25 to 44, 19.7% from 45 to 64, and 13.0% who were 65 years of age or older. The median age was 32 years. For every 100 females, there were 91.5 males. For every 100 females age 18 and over, there were 101.1 males.

The median income for a household in the city was $33,500, and the median income for a family was $37,813. Males had a median income of $30,938 versus $13,750 for females. The per capita income for the city was $12,673. About 11.3% of families and 11.9% of the population were below the poverty line, including 18.8% of those under age 18 and none of those age 65 or over.
