= Water baby (folklore) =

Supernatural water entities in Great Basin Native American cultures

Water spirits
Creature information
- Other name(s): Pawapicts (Ute), Pit-u-u or Paúngaa'a (Paiute), Paakniwat (Yokuts), Me-tsung (Washoe), Nu-numbi (Shoshone)
- Grouping: Legendary creature
- Similar entities: Nixie, Kelpie, Kappa
- Folklore: Water spirit

Origin
- Country: United States
- Region: Great Basin, Utah, Nevada, California, Wyoming, Idaho

Water babies (tribal names: Ute pawapicts, Paiute pit-u-u, Washoe me-tsung, Western Shoshone nu-numbi) are supernatural entities in the folklore of several Western Native American tribes, primarily within the Great Basin. While their appearance as crying infants leads some observers to identify them as ghosts, tribal traditions define them as a distinct species of spirits inhabiting springs, lakes, and volcanic regions. They are described as small beings with long, dark hair, possessing physical attributes such as fangs, fish tails, or reptilian skin. These spirits are regarded as guardians of water sources and, in shamanic traditions, serve as helpers for medicine people.

== Tribal distribution ==
The legend of the water baby is found in the cosmology of numerous linguistically and geographically diverse tribes, including the Northern Paiute, Southern Paiute, Western Shoshone, Washoe, Ute, Achumawi, Cahuilla, Cupeño, Luiseño, Serrano, Yokuts, and Interior Salish. Across these groups, the entity is consistently identified as a non-human, water-dwelling spirit possessing supernatural power and varied levels of malevolence toward humans.

== Shamanism and cosmological role ==
Ethnographic research involving the Southern Paiute indicates that water babies are part of a ceremonial landscape categorized by "mirrored" dimensions. Shamans, known as Puha’gants, report interacting with these spirits through "portals" located along volcanic ridges and near specific water sources. In this framework, water babies act as spirit helpers in ceremonies intended to produce rain. They are believed to move through an underground hydrological network connecting distant bodies of water. Interaction with these entities is restricted to practitioners with specific spiritual training, as they are considered hazardous to others due to their raw spiritual power.

== Regional variations ==
Among the Washoe, these spirits are guardians of the water table, particularly at Lake Tahoe and Cave Rock. They are described as judges of water purity and human behavior. Access to sacred springs was historically limited to healers who provided offerings, such as pine nuts, in exchange for power.

Paiute and Shoshone accounts emphasize the use of mimicry, specifically the imitation of human infant cries to lure individuals to the water's edge. At Massacre Rocks State Park in Idaho, Shoshone-Bannock traditions describe water babies inhabiting the Snake River. Local accounts suggest these spirits became predatory after being displaced by human activity. At Pyramid Lake, the spirits are associated with sudden drownings. Tribal members generally reject non-Native theories that link these spirits to historical infanticide, maintaining that water babies are an independent species that predates human presence.

The Ute of Utah Lake and the Provo River attribute the control of water levels and flash floods to the pawapicts. Sightings of these spirits on riverbanks were historically interpreted as signs of rising water levels. Those captured by the spirits were said to be taken to hidden underwater settlements. Descriptions often include a "magnetic" gaze that paralyzes the victim, preventing retreat once eye contact is established. This folklore functioned as a cautionary mechanism to keep children away from dangerous river currents.

== Archaeological associations ==
Beliefs regarding these spirits are reflected in Great Basin rock art. In the Pahranagat Valley and Delamar Valley, petroglyphs depict figures identified by Southern Paiute elders as water babies. These images are often located near volcanic fissures and are accompanied by symbols representing rain and shamanic activity. Unlike human figures in the same sites, these engravings are frequently elongated, representing their non-human, spiritual state.

== See also ==
- Ong (Washoe folklore)
- Nimerigar
- Water spirit
