= Shoshone-Bannock Tribes of the Fort Hall Reservation =

Federally recognized tribe in Idaho

- Type: Federally recognized tribal nation
- Headquarters: Fort Hall, Idaho, United States
- Members: Approximately 6,000 (2019)
- Governing body: Fort Hall Business Council
- Website: www.sbtribes.com

The Shoshone-Bannock Tribes of the Fort Hall Reservation, commonly known as the Shoshone-Bannock Tribes, are a federally recognized Native American tribal nation based on the Fort Hall Indian Reservation in southeastern Idaho. The federal government lists the nation under its full official name.

The tribal nation includes descendants of several bands of Northern Shoshone and Bannock, as well as Lemhi Shoshone people who were relocated to Fort Hall after the closure of the Lemhi Reservation in 1907. The Shoshone and Bannock communities are culturally related but traditionally speak distinct languages. Shoshoni is a Central Numic language, while Bannock is classified by linguists as a variety of Northern Paiute in the Western Numic branch. In 2019, the United States Census Bureau reported that the tribes had about 6,000 enrolled members, most of whom lived on the Fort Hall Reservation.

== Peoples and languages ==
Before the reservation era, Northern Shoshone and Bannock identities did not correspond to a single centralized political organization. Communities formed fluid bands and family groups whose composition varied according to season and subsistence activities. Groups living around the upper Snake River and Lemhi valleys assembled for autumn bison hunts and divided into smaller groups during the spring fishing season. Salmon fishing, hunting, and the gathering of camas and other plants were central to the regional economy.

The Bannock were Northern Paiute speakers who had lived and traveled with Northern Shoshone communities in Idaho for an extended period. They adopted horse-based bison hunting and developed close social and cultural relationships with the Shoshone, although the two languages remained distinct.

== History ==
=== Creation of the Fort Hall Reservation ===
American explorers, fur traders, and trading companies entered Shoshone and Bannock territories during the early nineteenth century. Increasing migration along overland trails beginning in the 1840s, followed by mining and permanent settlement, placed growing pressure on the peoples' lands and food resources.

The United States established the Fort Hall Reservation by executive order on June 14, 1867, for several Shoshone and Bannock bands. Representatives of the Eastern Shoshone and Bannock signed the Fort Bridger Treaty with the United States on July 3, 1868. The treaty established the Wind River Reservation for the Eastern Shoshone and provided for the selection of a separate Bannock reservation in the Portneuf and Camas Prairie region. An executive order issued by President Ulysses S. Grant on July 30, 1869, designated Fort Hall as the reservation promised to the Bannock and associated Shoshone bands.

The reservation was originally intended to contain approximately 1.8 million acres (7,300 km^{2}). A federal survey reduced that area to about 1.2 million acres (4,900 km^{2}), and later land cessions, railroad construction, the development of Pocatello, and allotment under the Dawes Act further reduced the tribal land base. During the late nineteenth and early twentieth centuries, Fort Hall residents developed cattle raising and agricultural enterprises while responding to federal assimilation policies and attempts to open reservation land to non-Native settlement.

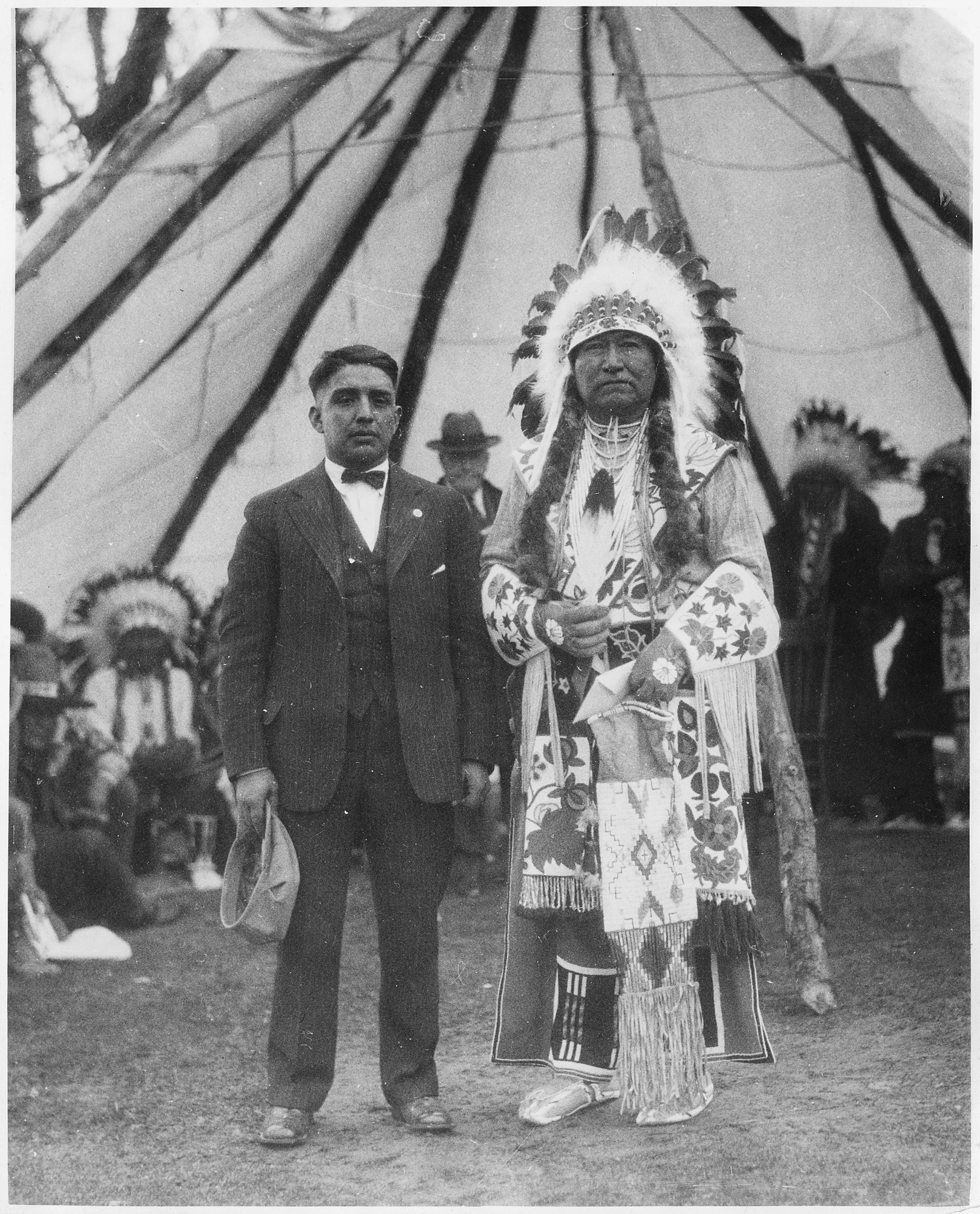
Tendoy, a Lemhi Shoshone leader, and interpreter George LaVatta at Fort Hall, c. 1923

The federal government established the Lemhi Reservation in northern Idaho in 1875. It closed the reservation in 1907 and relocated most of its Lemhi Shoshone residents to Fort Hall, where they became part of the emerging Shoshone-Bannock political community.

=== Constitutional government ===
Following the passage of the Indian Reorganization Act in 1934, Fort Hall residents adopted a constitution and bylaws on April 30, 1936. A federal corporate charter was ratified in 1937. These documents established the modern Fort Hall Business Council while preserving the tribal nation's pre-existing inherent and treaty-based authority.

== Government and reservation ==
Map of the Shoshone-Bannock tribal territory and neighboring tribes in Idaho.

The Fort Hall Business Council is the tribes' principal governing body. It consists of seven members elected by the general tribal membership to two-year terms. Under the tribal constitution, the council exercises authority over governmental affairs, contracts, land and resource development, and the administration of tribal programs.

The government is headquartered at Fort Hall, Idaho. The reservation is divided administratively into five districts: Bannock Creek, Fort Hall, Gibson, Lincoln Creek, and Ross Fork. It extends through portions of Bannock, Bingham, Caribou, and Power counties.

The tribal government administers courts, law enforcement, health and social services, education, natural-resource programs, and commercial enterprises. A 2019 Census Bureau profile reported that the tribal government and its enterprises employed more than 1,400 people in the surrounding region.

== Treaty rights and natural resources ==
Article 4 of the 1868 Fort Bridger Treaty reserved the right of tribal citizens to hunt on unoccupied lands of the United States while game remained available. Federal and state courts subsequently interpreted the treaty as also protecting off-reservation fishing. In 1994, the United States Court of Appeals for the Ninth Circuit held that the tribes' treaty right to fish on unoccupied federal lands was clearly established, subject to conservation measures necessary to preserve fish populations.

The Fort Hall Indian Water Rights Act of 1990 approved a negotiated settlement among the tribes, the United States, Idaho, and other water users concerning federal reserved water rights connected with the reservation.

Salmon restoration in the Snake and Columbia river systems remains an important treaty-rights and cultural issue for the tribes. Dams and other changes to the river system sharply reduced the salmon runs that historically reached Shoshone and Bannock fishing grounds in Idaho.

== Language and cultural programs ==
The tribes' Language and Cultural Preservation Department provides instruction in both Shoshoni and Bannock. It also maintains archival recordings, conducts historical research, and participates in the development of cultural and historical interpretation at sites within the tribes' ancestral territories.

The tribes hold the annual Shoshone-Bannock Indian Festival at Fort Hall. The multi-day event includes a competitive powwow, a parade, dancing, drumming, and other community activities. The sixtieth festival was held in 2025.

== Notable citizens ==
- LaNada War Jack, activist and professor
- Mark Trahant, journalist
- Randy'L He-dow Teton, model and educator

== See also ==
- Bannock War
- Fort Hall Indian Reservation
- Northern Shoshone
- Shoshone Bannock Jr./Sr. High School
- List of federally recognized tribes in the contiguous United States
