= Northern Shoshone =

Indigenous people of North America

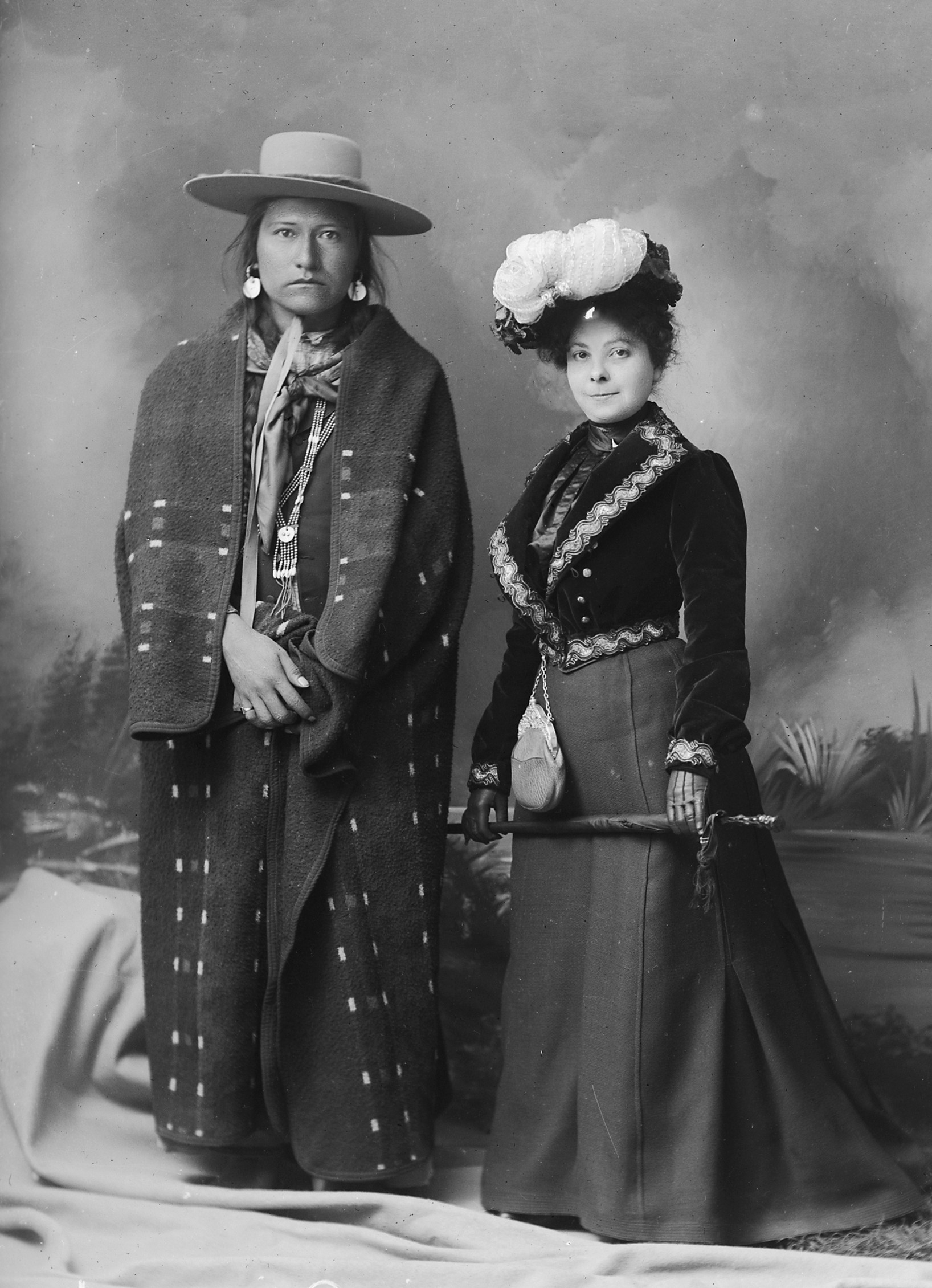
- Tindoor, chief of the Lemhi Shoshone and his wife, Idaho, ca. 1897, photograph by Benedicte Wrensted

Regions with significant populations
- United States (Idaho,Utah, Wyoming)

Languages
- Shoshone, English

Religion
- Native American Church, Sun Dance, traditional tribal religion, Christianity, Ghost Dance

Related ethnic groups
- other Shoshone people, Bannock

Map of traditional lands of the Northern Shoshone

Northern Shoshone are Shoshone of the Snake River Plain of southern Idaho and the northeast of the Great Basin where Idaho, Wyoming and Utah meet. They are culturally affiliated with the Bannock people and are in the Great Basin classification of Indigenous People.

== Language ==
Northern Shoshone is a dialect of the Shoshone language, a Central Numic language in the Uto-Aztecan language family. It is primarily spoken on the Fort Hall and Wind River reservations in Idaho and Wyoming, respectively.

== Bands ==
Bands of Shoshone people were named for their geographic homelands and for their primary food sources.

Mountain Shoshone bands:

- Agaideka or Agai-deka (Akaitikka, Salmon Eaters, Lemhi Shoshone, living on the middle and lower Snake River and in the Lemhi River Valley, Lemhi Range and Beaverhead Mountains in Idaho, originally following the same lifeway as the Tukudeka. After acquiring horses in the eighteenth century, they adopted a Plains style and went on buffalo hunts. They were also called Kuccuntikka or Kuchun-deka (Guchundeka, Kutsindüka, Buffalo Eaters)
- Tukudeka or Tuku-deka (Tukkutikka, Dukundeka), Sheep Eaters, Mountain Sheep Eaters, living along the Salmon River, Salmon River Mountains, in the Sawtooth Valley surrounded by the Sawtooth Range, upper Payette River, in the Bitterroot Mountains and Beaverhead Mountains in Idaho, and in the Wind River Range in western Wyoming. They also traveled north toward the upper Beaverhead drainage. and the upper Yellowstone River in northern Wyoming and southern Montana. The Tukkutikka bands living in the Wind River Range and the Yellowstone River region settled with the main body of Eastern Shoshone onto the Wind River Reservation in Wyoming. Later the Tukkutikka bands living in the Yellowstone River region settled with the main body of Eastern Shoshone onto the Wind River Reservation. The majority joined the Northern Shoshone as part of the Lemhi Shoshone. These were also known as Doyahinee (Mountain people) or Banaiti Doyanee(Bannock Mountaineers, because of great intermarriage with Bannock people).

Northwestern Shoshone bands:

- Kammitikka, Kamu-deka or Kamodika (Jack Rabbit Eaters, Black Tailed Rabbit Eaters, Bannock Creek Shoshone), Snake River, Great Salt Lake living from a base on Bannock Creek and Arbon Valley, they claimed lands extending from Raft River to the Portneuf River and Portneuf Range in northern Utah and southern Idaho. Their territory took in part of the Fort Hall Reservation when it was established in 1867. In 1873, the three major Bannock Creek bands (Chief Pocatello, with 101 people; San Pitch, with 124; and Sagwitch, with 158) moved to the reservation at Fort Hall. A small group went to Wind River; possibly synonymous with Hukundüka or Hukan-deka (Porcupine Grass Seed Eaters, Wild Wheat Eaters).
- Painkwitikka or Pengwideka (Penkwitikka, Fish Eaters, Bear Lake Shoshone), ranged from McCammon to Bear Lake along the Bear River and Logan River in the border region between Idaho and Utah, and on over to the continental divide, they lived generally north of the Cache Valley Shoshone band.
- Cache Valley Shoshone ranged into Idaho and Utah with their major base in Cache Valley—called in Shoshone Seuhubeogoi – "Willow Valley"—and on the lower reaches of Bear River not far from the later Wyoming border. They were practically wiped out at the Bear River Massacre on January 29, 1863. Some sources describe the massacre as the largest mass murder of Native Americans by the US military, and largest single episode of genocide in US history. Followed two months later by a similarly destructive campaign by Jefferson Standifer’s Placerville Volunteers against the Shoshone at Salmon Falls; this fight led to a series of Shoshone and Bannock treaties (Fort Bridger, July 2; Box Elder, July 30; Ruby Valley, October 1; Soda Springs, October 14) affecting Idaho, as well as the Tooele Valley Band of Goshute of the Western Shoshone. The survivors settled on Fort Hall Reservation.
- Weber Utes, a Shoshone band farther south along the Weber River to the Great Salt Lake in Utah, because having intermarried with neighboring Cumumba Band of Utes, they speak the same dialect as the other Northwestern bands with a slight Ute accent, and were therefore usually called Weber Utes—but they speak Shoshone and are primarily of Shoshone stock; were overlooked in the treaty-making process and never got a reservation, Chief Little Soldier headed the misnamed "Weber Ute" band of about 400 people.

Fort Hall Shoshone Bands:

- Boho'inee or Pohokwi (Pohogwe, Pohoini, Sage Grass people, Sagebrush Butte People, which refers to Ferry Butte at Fort Hall), mixed Shoshone-Bannock band, living in southeastern Idaho on the Snake River Plain, in the Wind River Range, Salmon Falls on Snake River and wintered in the vicinity of the trading post Fort Hall, but also claimed the Camas Prairie as home, later called Fort Hall Shoshone or "Sho-Bans", also considered part of the Eastern Shoshone Bands

Western Bands of Northern Shoshone:

- Yahandeka or Yahantikka (Yakandika, Groundhog Eaters, grouped into three main geographical groupings of mixed Northern Shoshone-Northern Paiute bands):
  - Boise Shoshone, among the early mounted Shoshone bands, they traveled over a considerable range by the beginning of the nineteenth century, with their main hunting lands along the lower Boise River and Payette River. When Donald MacKenzie developed the Snake country fur trade after 1818, the most prominent of the Boise Shoshone, Peiem (a Shoshoni rendition of "Big Jim", their leader's English name), became the most influential leader of the large composite Shoshoni band that white trappers regularly encountered in the Snake country. Peiem served as the most important Shoshone spokesman at MacKenzie’s great peace conference on Little Lost River in 1820, and figured conspicuously in Shoshone affairs when Alexander Ross and Peter Skeene Ogden led the Snake expedition later in the decade. Peiem's son, and successor, Captain Jim, was a leader of the Boise Shoshone at the time of their removal, March 12-April 13, to the Fort Hall Reservation, which had been established for the Boise and Bruneau Shoshone, June 14, 1867, a mixed Shoshone-Northern Paiute group of Koa'aga'itöka ("Salmon Caught in Traps Eaters") of Northern Paiute and local Northern Shoshone groups.
  - Bruneau Shoshone, were not organized into bands, occupied southwestern Idaho, mainly south of Snake River along the Bruneau River and from Goose Creek to Owyhee River, when the gold rush to Boise Basin brought settlers in after 1862, a mixed Shoshone-Northern Paiute group of Tagötöka/Taga Ticutta ("Root Tuber Eaters") and Wadadökadö/Wadatika (Waadadikady) ("Wada Root and Grass-seed Eaters") of Northern Paiute and local Northern Shoshone groups. After their treaty of April 12, 1866, went unratified, the Fort Hall Reservation was set aside partly for them. Later in 1877, the Duck Valley Reservation was established in their lands.
  - Weiser Shoshone or Shewoki / Sohuwawki Shoshone, lived along the lower Weiser River to New Plymouth, this country was called Shewoki, sɨ·wo·kkiʔi or Su:woki—"willow-striped" or "Row of Willows" by the Shoshone, some of whom resisted placement on the Malheur Reservation, finally settled at Fort Hall and on the Duck Valley Indian Reservation, a mixed Shoshone-Northern Paiute group of Wadadökadö/Wadatika (Waadadikady) ("Wada Root and Grass-seed Eaters") and Koa'aga'itöka ("Salmon Caught in Traps Eaters") of Northern Paiute and Shoshone groups from Bruneau and Boise Rivers.

== Tribes and reservations ==
The Northern Shoshone have people who are members of three federally recognized tribes in Idaho and Utah:

- Duck Valley Indian Reservation, Idaho, for the Western Shoshone-Northern Paiute Tribe
- Shoshone-Bannock Tribes of the Fort Hall Reservation of Idaho, 544,000 acres (2,201 km^{2}) in Idaho. Lemhi Shoshone with the Bannock Indians, a Paiute band with which they have merged.
- Lemhi Indian Reservation (1875–1907) in Idaho. This reservation was closed and the people relocated to Fort Hall Reservation, where they are counted with the Shoshone-Bannock peoples.
- Northwestern Band of the Shoshone Nation

== Culture ==
Robert H. Lowie documents the material and social culture of the Northern Shoshone as he saw it in 1909. It reflected a highly adaptive and communal way of life defined through their environment and intertribal communication. His recordings primarily consider the Lemhi Shoshone but can still provide general aspects of the Northern Shoshone culture more broadly, during this time.

- material culture consisted of stone, bone, and shell tools: knives and arrow points were made from obsidian; awls, salmon-gigs, and some game implements of bone; antlers and ribs used as scrapers for hide work; drinking cups and spoons of mountain-sheep or buffalo horn; shells (abalone) used for personal decoration and obtained by trade from costal tribes. Pots and stone vessels consisted of steatite (soapstone) vessels and possibly lava cooking pots were used. Baskets made by coiling or twining (gathering baskets, water-bottles, roasting trays, hats, fans, gambling trays); mats from rushes used for sleeping and transport. Hide preparation included buffalo, elk, and deer hides which were tanned with prolonged soaking, brain/boiling treatments, scalping with elk-horn or rib scrapers, wringing and smoothing on cords or frames; smoking was used to finish and protect hides. Clothing styles were usually blanket robes (buffalo, antelope, deer, bighorn; sometimes beaver or wolf) worn by both sexes; men's shirts of dressed deer/antelope/elk skins with fringed sides, decorated with quillwork or beadwork. Women's chemises were similarly ornamented and closed at sides; tippets and collars of otter/ermine were elaborately made and ornamented with shell. Men commonly wore two front braids decorated with skins and feathers; face and body paint were used for dances and war. There was limited tattooing/puncturing by women with soot or grease applied. Jewelry and status ornaments consisted of bead necklaces (preceded by salmon vertebrae or shells,) elk-tooth necklaces for women/children, bear-claw necklaces as marks of having killed a grizzly. Fans were made from eagle feathers with red cloth and bells. Beadwork and embroidery included use of quillwork and beadwork with characteristic stitches; women use bow-shaped or rectangular looms for beadwork; some pieces show Dakota-like ridged bead bands (row of beads stung and sewn in alternating directions.) Cordage techniques were used in fishing and baskets that were made with specific warp twisting, coiled borders, tight pitching to make water-bottles watertight.
- Dwellings and domestic life consisted of log cabins by the time of Lowie's visit. Summer shade-lodges rectangular brush-roofed structures used for daily life and a central fireplace; smaller shade enclosers conical menstrual huts or small dome sweat-lodge-like structures were also commonly used. The interior of houses were characterized by flooring of foliage, skins for seats/beds, rolled rush mats for sleeping and transport, raw hide bags and parfleches for storage. While at war, simple semi-cylindrical willow-frame shelters covered with blankets for mobility when on campaign.
- Economy can be divided into subsistence and trade. The subsistence economy consisted of intensive hunting of bison, elk, deer, small game, and fishing. Traded objects were mostly shell ornaments from costal peoples, many manufactured items, and beads.
- Warfare was adopted from many prairie war customs. Scalping, coup-sticks, painted faces, feathered bonnets and standards, and ritual shield-making ceremonies to give protective power. Armor consisted of layered dressed-antelope skin armor for men and horses; shields made form buffalo neck-skin hardened with heat and clay and ritually prepared to be arrow-proof. Scalping, signal-fires on mountains; paint and feather standards in war display.

=== Origin story ===
The coyote is the central culture-hero and originator of the Shoshone. After coyote departs, many babies begin to fall out of women's wombs in great numbers. The women wash the babies with water that Coyote brings. During this washing most of the tribes of natives are made, however some babies are left unwashed and set aside. Coyote is the one to wash these babies themselves, the first of the Shoshone. He tells them: "you are my children, I am going to stay with you." This set the Shoshone apart and made them special patrons of the Shoshone. If the Coyote had washed every child all the tribes would be Shoshone. It was the women who washed the other babies and explain why those tribes have conflicts with the Shoshone. Coyote instructs his children to be brace and not fear the other Indians. In an alternative episode, the Coyote came to an old woman and her daughter at night. He married the daughter, and their ancestors became the Shoshone.
