= Shoshone =

Native American tribe

Newe
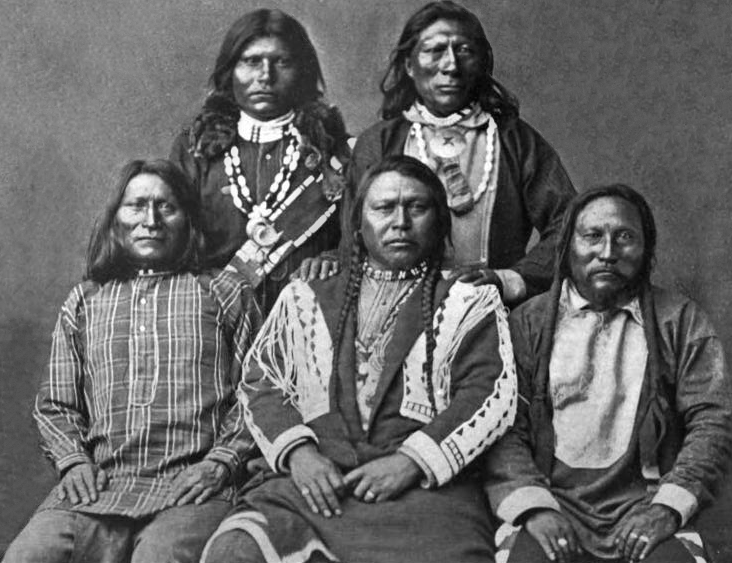
- Group of Shoshone Indians

Total population
- 12,300 (2000)

Regions with significant populations
- United States (Idaho, California, Nevada, Oregon, Utah, Wyoming)

Languages
- Shoshone, English

Religion
- Native American Church, Sun Dance, traditional tribal religion, Christianity, Ghost Dance

Related ethnic groups
- Timbisha and Comanche

Neme / Newe "People"
- People: Neme; Newe
- Language: Neme Ta̲i̲kwappeh; Newe Ta̲i̲kwappe
- Country: Neme Segobia; Newe Segobia

The Shoshone or Shoshoni (/ʃoʊˈʃoʊni/ shoh-SHOH-nee or /ʃəˈʃoʊni/ shə-SHOH-nee), also known by the endonym Newe, are an Indigenous people of the United States with four large cultural/linguistic divisions:

- Eastern Shoshone: Wyoming
- Northern Shoshone: Southern Idaho
- Western Shoshone: California, Nevada, and Northern Utah
- Goshute: western Utah, eastern Nevada

They traditionally speak the Shoshoni language, part of the Numic languages branch of the large Uto-Aztecan language family. The Shoshone were sometimes called the Snake Indians by neighboring tribes and early American explorers.

Their peoples have become members of federally recognized tribes throughout their traditional areas of settlement, often co-located with the Northern Paiute people of the Great Basin.

== Etymology ==
The name "Shoshone" comes from Sosoni, a Shoshone word for high-growing grasses. Some neighboring tribes call the Shoshone "Grass House People," based on their traditional homes made from sosoni. Shoshones call themselves Newe, meaning "People".

Meriwether Lewis recorded the tribe as the "Sosonees or snake Indians" in 1805.

== Language ==
The Shoshoni language is spoken by approximately 1,000 people today. It belongs to the Central Numic branch of the Uto-Aztecan language family. Speakers are scattered from central Nevada to central Wyoming.

The largest numbers of Shoshoni speakers live on the federally recognized Duck Valley Indian Reservation, located on the border of Nevada and Idaho; and Goshute Reservation in Utah. Idaho State University also offers Shoshoni-language classes.

== History ==
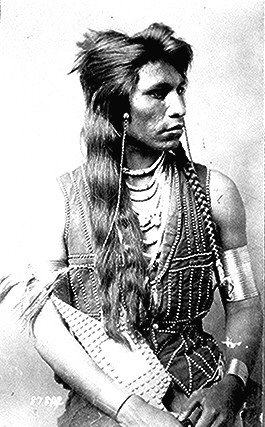
Rabbit-Tail or Moragootch (information varies).

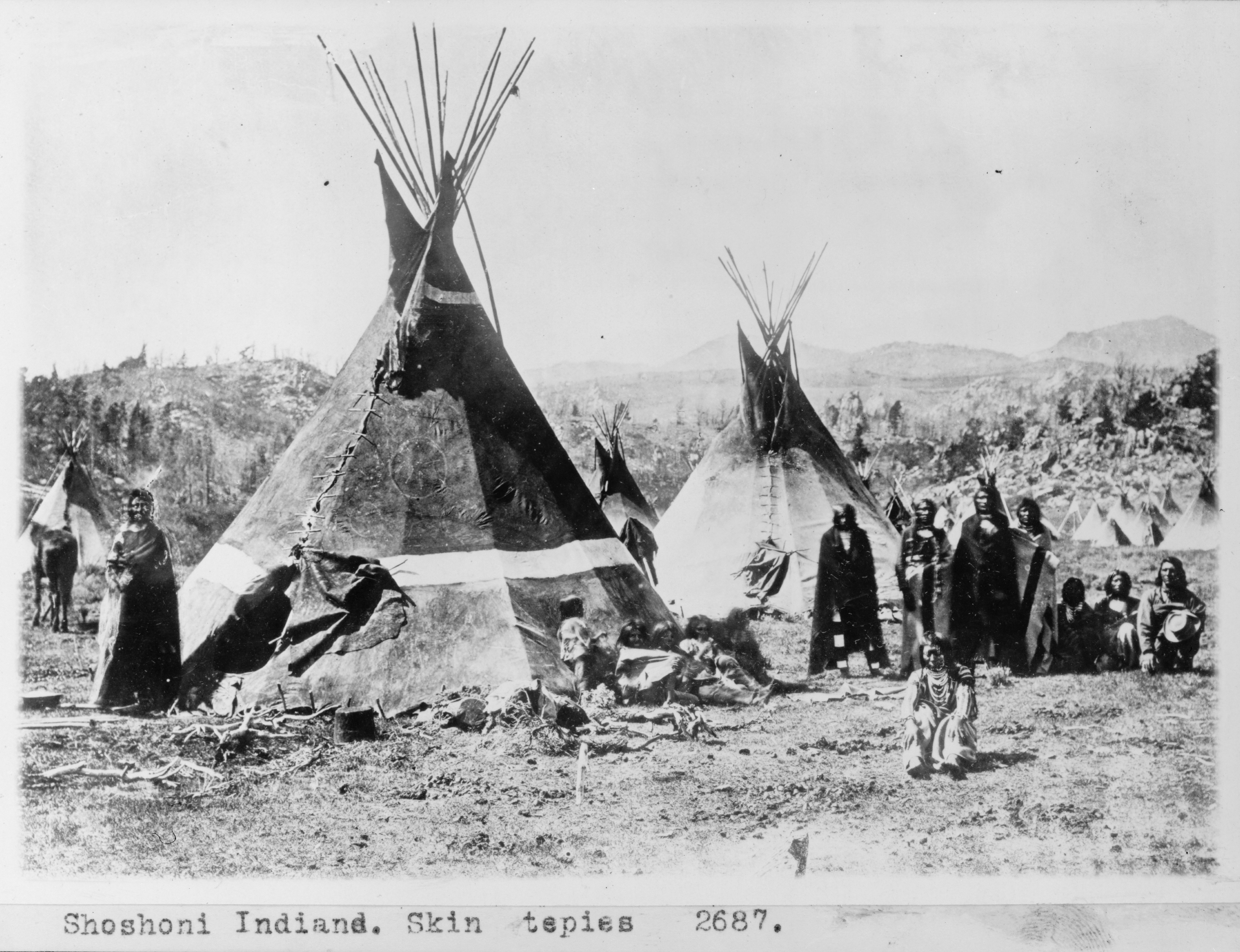
A Shoshone encampment in the Wind River Range of Wyoming, photographed by W. H. Jackson, 1870

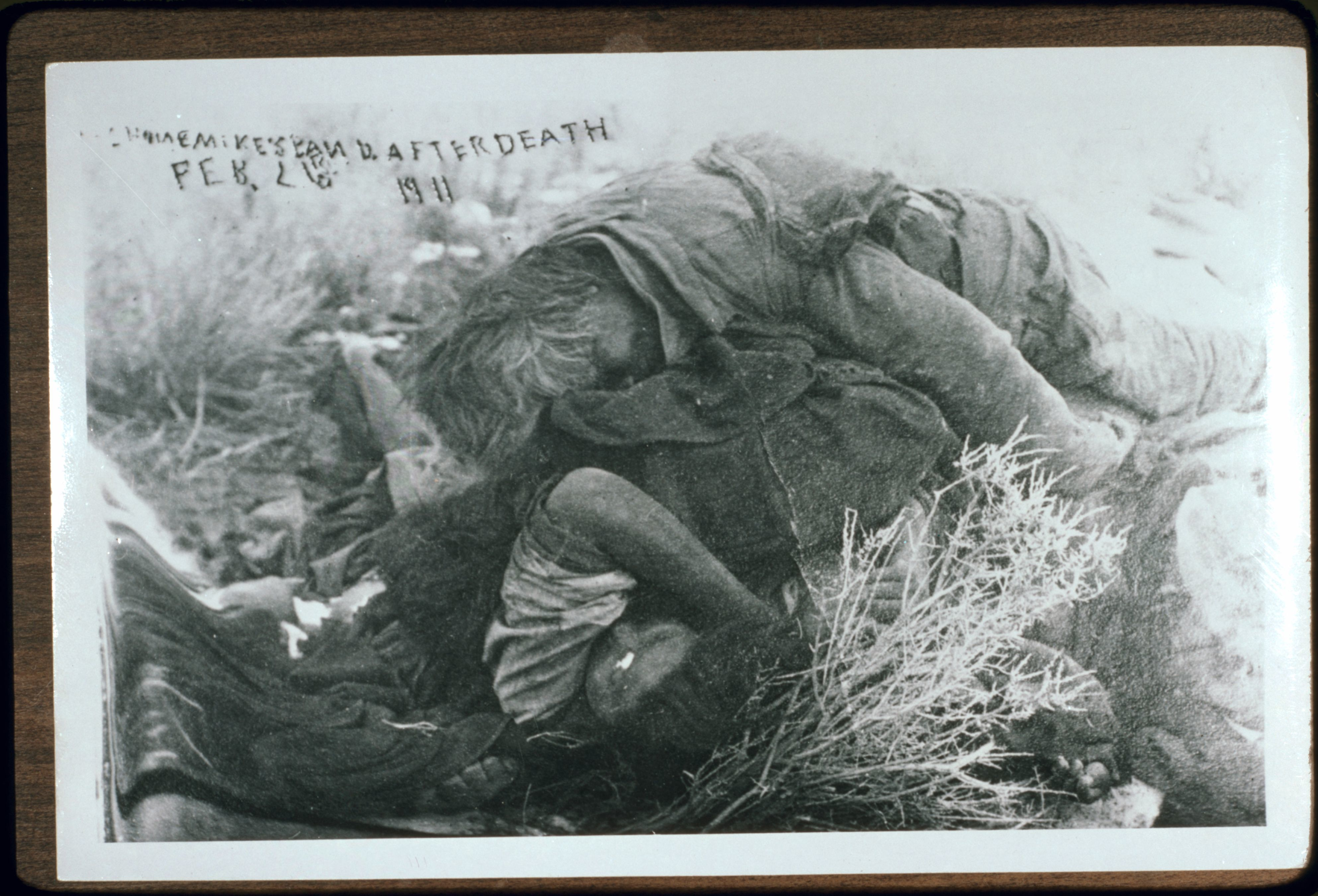
Reported picture of Mike Daggett February 26, 1911

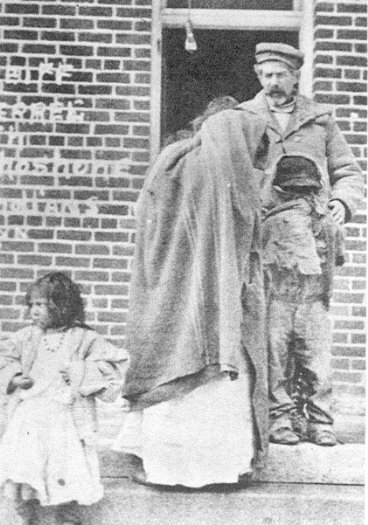
Sheriff Charles Ferrel with the surviving members of Mike Daggett's family (Daggett's daughter Heney (Louise, 17), and two of his grandchildren, Cleveland (Mosho, 8), and Hattie (Harriet Mosho, 4))

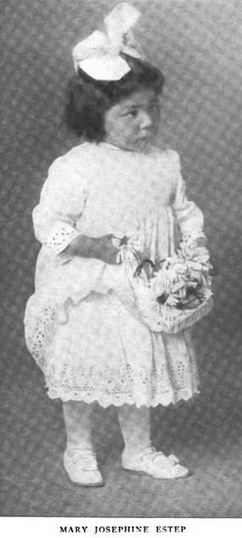
Daggett grandchild Mary Jo Estep (1909 or 1910 – 1992), age 5 in 1916

The Shoshone are a Native American tribe that originated in the western Great Basin and spread north and east into present-day Idaho and Wyoming. By 1500, some Eastern Shoshone had crossed the Rocky Mountains into the Great Plains. As one of the first northern tribes to incorporate horses and firearms into their economy, hunting and warfare, the Shoshone nation became a dominant power feared by their enemies. The Eastern Shoshone in particular expanded their territory well into the northern plains through mastery of horsemanship, while another Shoshone branch moved as far south as Texas, emerging as the Comanche by 1700. After 1750, their advantage in warfare diminished, and pressure from the Blackfoot, Crow, Lakota, Cheyenne, and Arapaho pushed Eastern Shoshone south and westward to the Rocky Mountains, a situation that escalated until the establishment of the Shoshone Reservation on the Wind River in the 1860s.

As more European American settlers migrated west, tensions rose with the indigenous people over competition for territory and resources. Wars occurred throughout the second half of the 19th century. The Northern Shoshone, led by Chief Pocatello, fought during the 1860s against settlers in Idaho (where the city Pocatello was named for him). As more settlers encroached on Shoshone hunting territory, the natives raided farms and ranches for food and attacked immigrants.

The warfare resulted in the Bear River Massacre (1863) when US forces attacked and killed an estimated 250 Northwestern Shoshone, who were at their winter encampment in present-day Franklin County, Idaho. A large number of the dead were non-combatants, including children, deliberately killed by the soldiers. This was the highest number of deaths which the Shoshone suffered at the hands of United States forces. 21 US soldiers were also killed.

During the American Civil War travelers continued to migrate westward along the Westward Expansion Trails. When the Shoshone, along with the Utes participated in attacks on the mail route that ran west out of Fort Laramie, the mail route had to be relocated south of the trail through Wyoming.

Allied with the Bannock, to whom they were related, the Northern and Western Shoshone fought against the United States in the Snake War from 1864 to 1868. They fought U.S. forces together in 1878 in the Bannock War. By contrast, from 1863 onward, the Eastern Shoshone led by Chief Washakie allied with the American government and secured treaties at Fort Bridger in 1863 and 1868. In 1876, Eastern Shoshone fought alongside the US Army in the Battle of the Rosebud against their traditional enemies, the Lakota and Cheyenne.

In 1859, a band of approximately 300 Eastern Shoshone (known as Sheepeaters) became involved in the Sheepeater Indian War. It was the last Indian war fought in the Pacific Northwest region of the present-day United States. In 1911, a small group of Bannock under a leader named Mike Daggett, also known as Shoshone Mike, killed four ranchers in Washoe County, Nevada. The settlers formed a posse and went out after the Native Americans. They caught up with the Bannock band on February 25, 1911, and in a gun battle killed Mike Daggett and seven members of his band. They lost one man of the posse, Ed Hogle in the Battle of Kelley Creek. The posse captured an infant named Mary Jo Estep, along with two children and a young woman. The three older captives died of diseases within a year; Mary Jo Estep survived, and died in 1992, around the age of 82.

A rancher donated the partial remains of two adult males, two adult females, two adolescent males, and three children (believed to be Mike Daggett and his family, according to contemporary accounts) to the Smithsonian Institution in Washington, D.C., for study. In 1994, the institution repatriated the remains to the Fort Hall Idaho Shoshone-Bannock Tribe.

In 2008 the Northwestern Band of the Shoshone Nation acquired the site of the Bear River Massacre and some surrounding land. They wanted to protect the holy land and to build a memorial to the massacre, the largest their nation had suffered. "In partnership with the American West Heritage Center and state leaders in Idaho and Utah, the tribe has developed public/private partnerships to advance tribal cultural preservation and economic development goals." They have become leaders in developing tribal renewable energy.

== Historical population ==
The Shoshone were scattered over a vast area and divided into many bands, therefore many estimates of their population did not cover the entire tribe. In 1820 Jedidiah Morse estimated the Shoshone population at 60,000 and 20,000 Eastern Shoshone. According to Alexander Ross the Shoshone were on the west side of the Rocky Mountains what the Sioux were on the east side—the most powerful tribe—and he estimated that in 1855 the Shoshone numbered 36,000 people. They were much reduced in number after they had suffered infectious disease epidemics and warfare. According to Joseph Lane the Shoshone were divided into many bands and it was almost impossible to ascertain their exact numbers. According to Indian Affairs 1859 in Utah there were 4,500 Shoshones. Indian Affairs 1866 reported in Utah 4,500 eastern Bannock and Shoshone intermingled and 3,800 western and northwestern Shoshone as well as 2,000 Shoshone in Nevada and 2,500 Shoshone in Idaho, as well as an unspecified number in Oregon. The completion of the first transcontinental railroad in 1869 was followed by European-American immigrants arriving in unprecedented numbers in the territory. Indian Affairs 1875 gave the Shoshone as 1,740 in Idaho and Montana, 1,945 in Nevada, 700 in Wyoming and 244 (besides those intermixed with the Bannock) in Oregon. The census of 1910 returned 3,840 Shoshone. In 1937, the Bureau of Indian Affairs counted 3,650 Northern Shoshone and 1,201 Western Shoshone. As of the 2000 US census, some 12,000 persons identified as Shoshone. As of 2020 there were in the USA 17,918 Shoshone including 3,638 in Nevada and 3,491 in Wyoming.

== Bands ==
Shoshone people are divided into traditional bands based both on their homelands and primary food sources. These include:

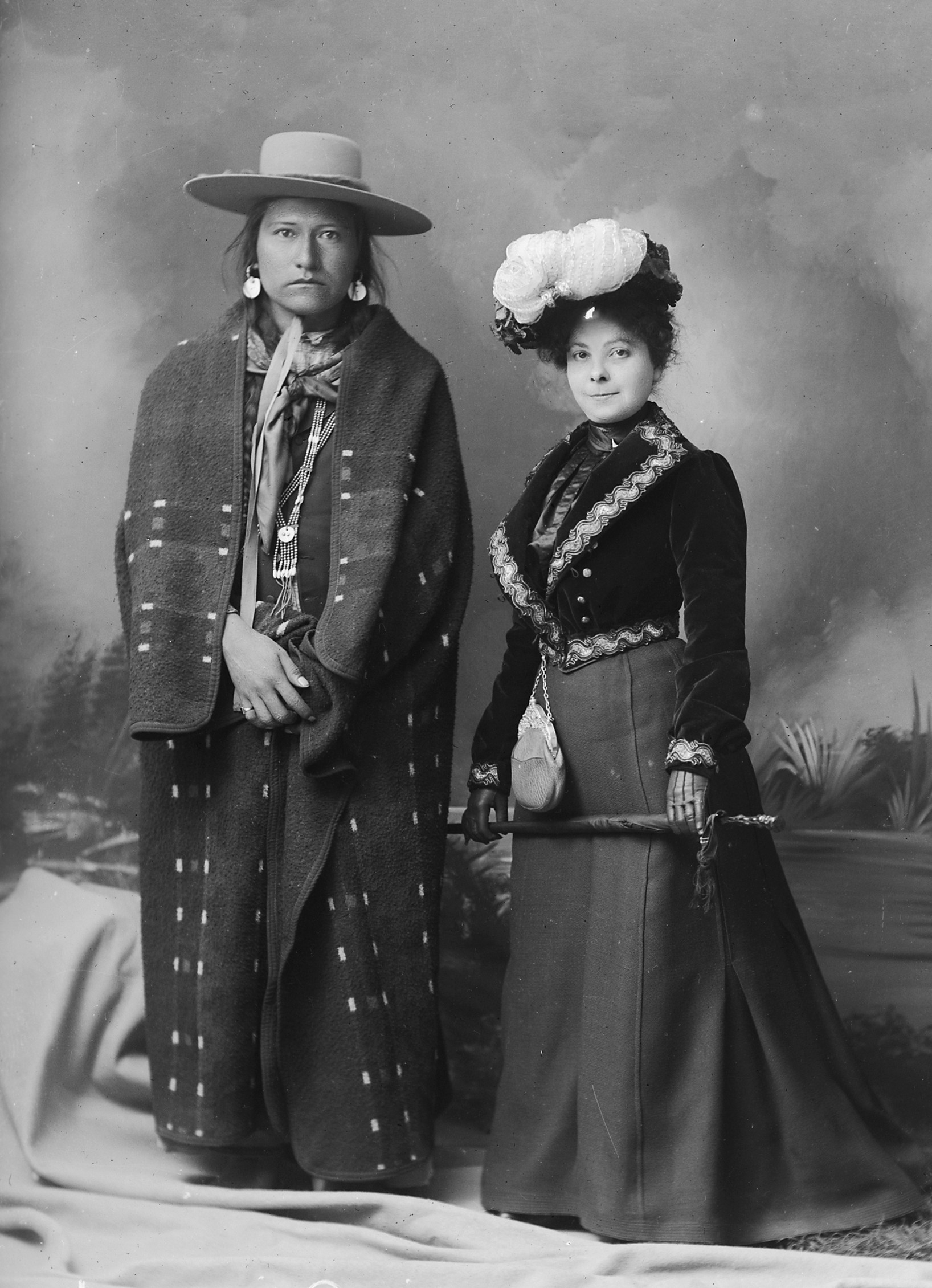
Tindoor, Lemhi Shoshone chief and his wife, ca. 1897, photographed by Benedicte Wrensted

- Eastern Shoshone people:

- Guchundeka', Kuccuntikka, Buffalo Eaters This group is the namesake of Kuchunteka'a Toyavi, alternately spelled Guchandeka Doyavi, which means Buffalo Eaters Mountain, located in the Absaroka Range of northwest Wyoming.
- Tukkutikka, Tukudeka, Mountain Sheep Eaters, part of the Eastern Shoshone and Northern Shoshone
- Boho'inee', Pohoini, Pohogwe, Sage Grass people, Sagebrush Butte People

- Northern Shoshone people:

- Agaideka, Salmon Eaters, Lemhi, Snake River and Lemhi River Valley
- Kammedeka, Kammitikka, Jack Rabbit Eaters, Snake River, Great Salt Lake
- Hukundüka, Porcupine Grass Seed Eaters, Wild Wheat Eaters, possibly synonymous with Kammitikka

- Tukudeka, Dukundeka', Sheep Eaters (Mountain Sheep Eaters), Sawtooth Range, Idaho, synonymous with Doyahinee' (Mountain Dwellers).
- Yahandeka, Yakandika, Groundhog Eaters, lower Boise, Payette, and Wiser Rivers

- Western Shoshone people:

- Kusiutta, Goshute (Gosiute), Great Salt Desert and Great Salt Lake, Utah

- Cedar Valley Goshute
- Deep Creek Goshute
- Rush Valley Goshute
- Skull Valley Goshute, Wipayutta, Weber Ute
- Tooele Valley Goshute
- Trout Creek Goshute

- Kuyatikka, Kuyudikka, Bitterroot Eaters, Halleck, Mary's River, Clover Valley, Smith Creek Valley, Nevada
- Mahaguadüka, Mentzelia Seed Eaters, Ruby Valley, Nevada
- Painkwitikka, Penkwitikka, Fish Eaters, Cache Valley, Idaho and Utah
- Pasiatikka, Redtop Grass Eaters, Deep Creek Gosiute, Deep Creek Valley, Antelope Valley
- Tipatikka, Pinenut Eaters, northernmost band
- Tsaiduka, Tule Eaters, Railroad Valley, Nevada
- Tsogwiyuyugi, Elko, Nevada
- Waitikka, Ricegrass Eaters, Ione Valley, Nevada
- Watatikka, Ryegrass Seed Eaters, Ruby Valley, Nevada
- Wiyimpihtikka, Buffalo Berry Eaters

== Reservations and Indian colonies ==
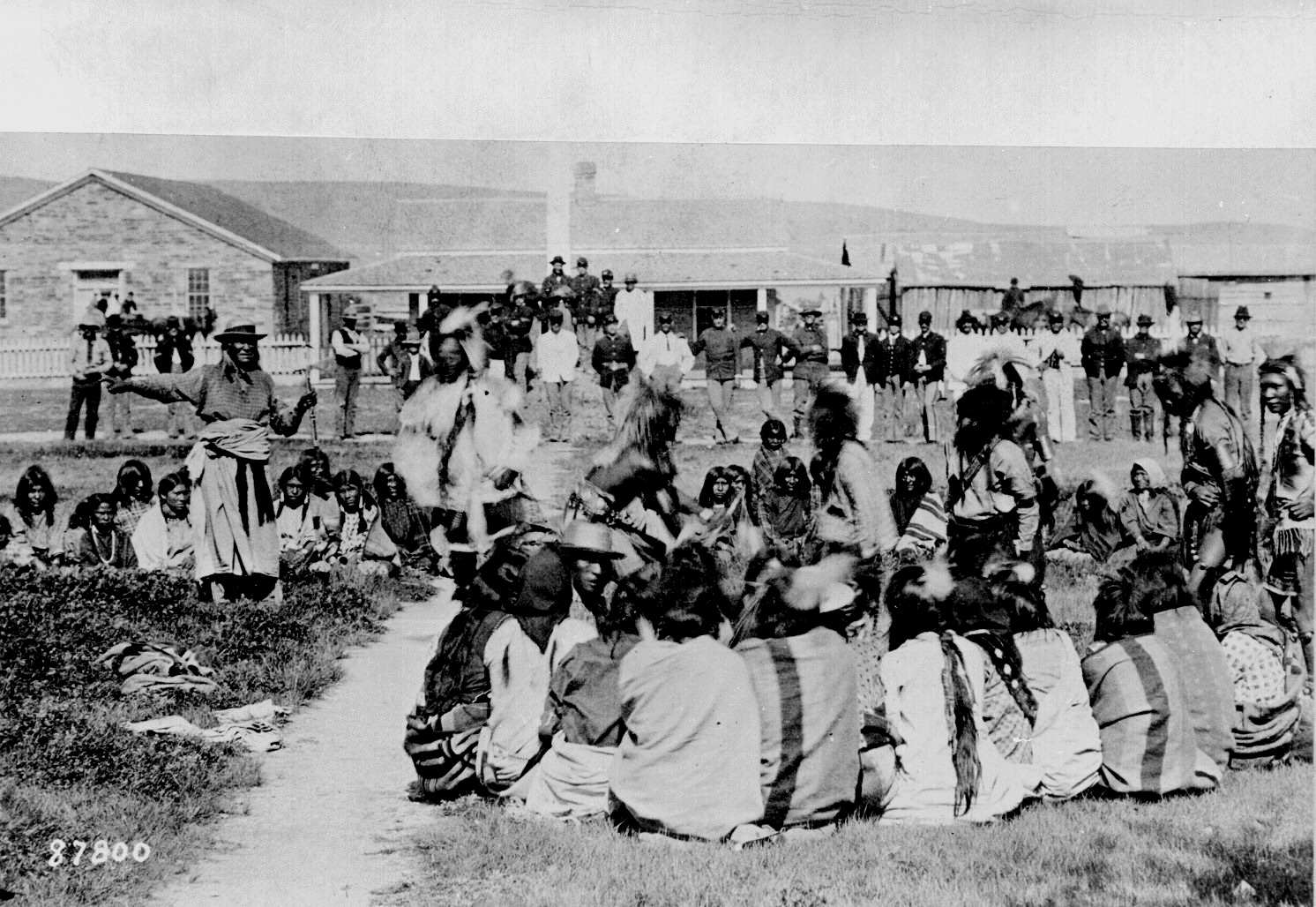
"Shoshone at Ft. Washakie, Wyoming Native American reservation. Chief Washakie (at left) extends his right arm." Some of the Shoshones are dancing as the soldiers look on, 1892.

- Battle Mountain Reservation, Lander County, Nevada. Current reservation population is 165 and total tribal enrollment is 516.
- Duck Valley Indian Reservation, southern Idaho/northern Nevada, (Western) Shoshone-Paiute Tribes
- Duckwater Indian Reservation, located in Duckwater, Nevada, approximately 75 miles (121 km) from Ely.
- Elko Indian Colony, Elko County, Nevada
- Ely Shoshone Indian Reservation in Ely, Nevada, 111 acres (0.45 km^{2}), 500 members
- Fallon Paiute-Shoshone Reservation near Fallon, Nevada, 8,200 acres (33 km^{2}), 991 members, Western Shoshone and Paiute
- Fort Hall Indian Reservation, 544,000 acres (2,201 km^{2}) in Idaho, Lemhi Shoshone with the Bannock Indians, a Paiute band with which they have merged
- Fort McDermitt Indian Reservation, Nevada and Oregon, Fort McDermitt Paiute and Shoshone Tribe
- Goshute Indian Reservation, 111,000 acres (449 km^{2}) in Nevada and Utah, Western Shoshone
- Lemhi Indian Reservation (1875–1907) in Idaho, Lemhi Shoshone, removed to Fort Hall Reservation
- Northwestern Shoshone Indian Reservation, Utah, Northwestern Band of Shoshone Nation of Utah (Washakie)
- Reno-Sparks Indian Colony, Nevada, 1,988 acres (8 km^{2}), total 481 members of Shoshone, Paiute, and Washoe bands
- Skull Valley Indian Reservation, 18,000 acres (73 km^{2}) in Utah, Western Shoshone
- South Fork Odgers Ranch Indian Colony, Elko County, Nevada
- Wells Indian Colony, Elko County, Nevada
- Wind River Reservation, population 2,650 Eastern Shoshone, 2,268,008 acres (9,178 km^{2}) of reservation in Wyoming are shared with the Northern Arapaho

== Notable people ==
- Sacagawea (1788–1812), Lemhi Shoshone guide of the Lewis and Clark Expedition
- Jean Baptiste Charbonneau (1805–1866) son of Sacagawea, explorer, guide, military scout
- Cameahwait, chief in the early 19th century
- Bear Hunter (d. 1863), war chief
- Old Toby
- Ned Blackhawk (b. ca. 1970), historian and professor at Yale
- Mary Dann and Carrie Dann
- Randy'L He-dow Teton
- Chief Washakie
- Chief Pocatello
- Lolly Vegas, lead singer of Redbone (band)
- Taboo (rapper), member of the Black Eyed Peas (Shoshone grandmother)
- TiaCorine, rapper (Shoshone mother)

== See also ==
- Battle of Kelley Creek
- United States v. Shoshone Tribe of Indians
- Western Shoshone traditional narratives
