= Tio-van-du-ah =

Tio-van-du-ah (died 1863), who was often called Chief Snag, was a Lemhi Shoshone Chief in what is today known as the Lemhi Valley of Idaho. This area was so named by Mormon missionaries who established Fort Limhi in the area in 1855. Tio-van-du-ah joined the Church of Jesus Christ of Latter-day Saints (LDS Church) along with about 100 of his fellow Shoshoni. He does not seem to have participated with Shoo-woo-koo and his Bannocks in stealing the cattle of the Mormon missionaries. However, the missionaries abandoned their fort due to the mass robbery of their cattle and killing of some missionaries in the process by the Bannocks and some Shoshone who worked with them, leaving Tio-van-du-ah with no connection with the LDS Church.

Tio-van-du-ah was killed in Bannock, Montana in 1863 by Charlie Reeves, William Mitchell and a man named Reeves in a dispute over a Shoshone woman previously purchased by Reeves.

== Sources ==
- Leonard J. Arrington. History of Idaho, vol. 1. (Moscow, Idaho: University of Idaho Press, 1994) p. 172, 179.
- Hank Corless. The Weiser Indians: Shoshoni Peacemakers. (Salt Lake City: University of Utah Press, 1990) p. 28.
- article that mentions Chief Snag's 1863 death
- Langford, Nathaniel P. "Vigilante Days and Ways". (American & World GeographicPublishing: Helena, MT, 1996) p. 83.
