= Robert Lowie =

Austrian-American anthropologist (1883–1957)

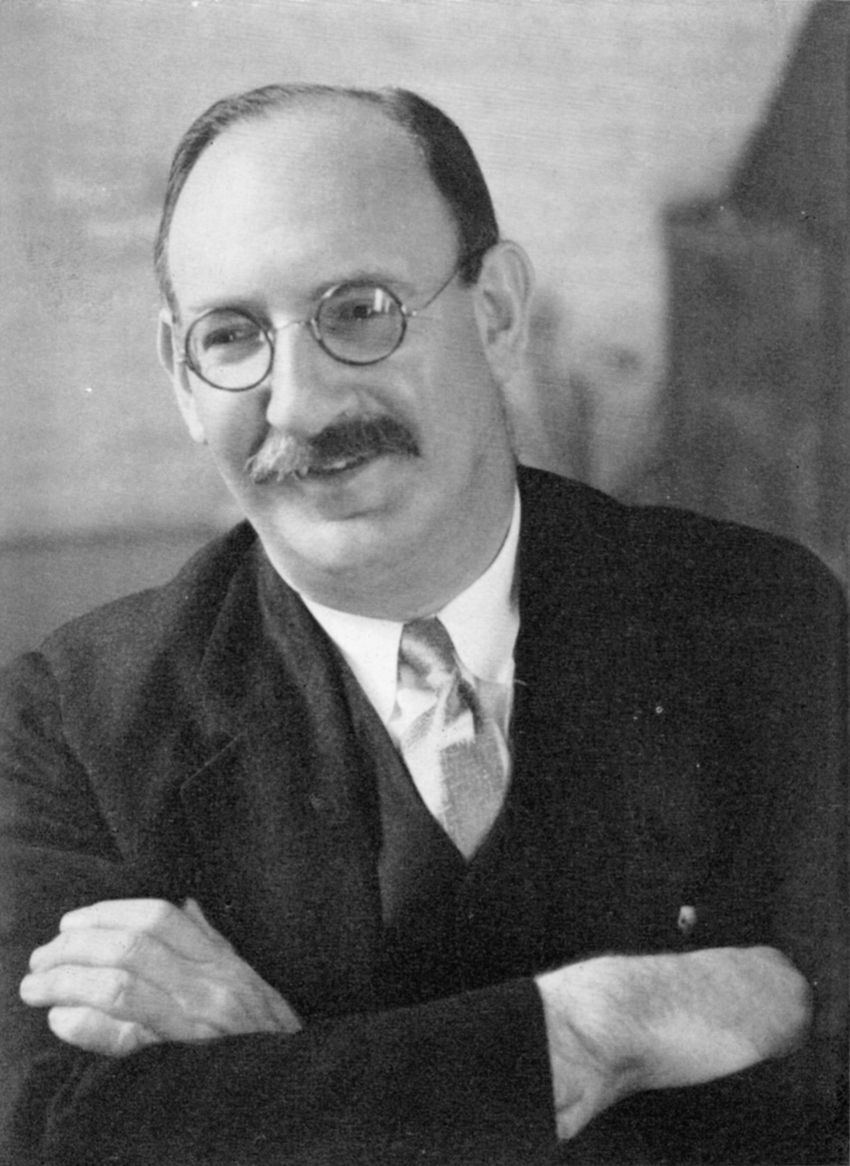
- Lowie in 1933
- Born: Robert Heinrich Löwe; July 12, 1883; Vienna, Austria-Hungary (now Austria)
- Died: September 21, 1957 (aged 74); Berkeley, California, U.S.

Academic background
- Education: Columbia University
- Thesis: The Test-Theme in North American Mythology (1908)
- Doctoral advisor: Franz Boas

Academic work
- Discipline: North American Indigenous anthropology
- Influenced: Claude Levi-Strauss

Robert Harry Lowie (born Robert Heinrich Löwe; June 12, 1883 – September 21, 1957) was an Austrian-American anthropologist. An expert on Indigenous peoples of the Americas, he was instrumental in the development of modern anthropology and has been described as "one of the key figures in the history of anthropology".

== Early life and education ==
Lowie was born and spent the first ten years of his life in Vienna, Austria-Hungary, but came to the United States in 1893. He studied at the College of the City of New York, where in 1896 he met and befriended Paul Radin while taking a BA in Classical Philology in 1901. After a short stint as a teacher, he began studying chemistry at Columbia University, but soon switched to anthropology under the tutelage of Franz Boas, Livingston Farrand and Clark Wissler. Influenced by Wissler, Lowie began his first fieldwork on the Lemhi Reservation in Idaho with the Northern Shoshone in 1906. He graduated (Ph.D.) in 1908 with a dissertation titled The Test-Theme in North American Mythology.

== Career ==
In 1909, he became assistant curator to Clark Wissler at the American Museum of Natural History, New York. During his time there, Lowie became a specialist in American Indians, being active in field research, particularly in several excursions to the Great Plains. This work led in particular to his identification with the Crow Indians. In 1917, he became assistant professor at the University of California, Berkeley. From 1925 until his retirement in 1950, he was professor of anthropology at Berkeley, where, along with Alfred Louis Kroeber, he was a central figure in anthropological scholarship.

Lowie undertook several expeditions to the Great Plains, where he conducted ethnographic fieldwork at the Absarokee (Crow, 1907, 1910–1916, 1931), Arikaree, Hidatsa, Mandan and Shoshone (1906, 1912–1916). Shorter research expeditions led him to the southwestern United States, the Great Basin and to South America where he was inspired by Curt Nimuendajú. The focus of some of Lowie's work was salvage ethnography, the rapid collection of data from cultures close to extinction.

Ruth Benedict and Robert Lowie were each commissioned by the United States Office of War Information, during World War II, to write a piece about an enemy. Unlike Benedict's Chrysanthemum and the Sword, in which she describes the culture of Japan without ever having set foot in that country, Lowie could at least draw on his recollections from the German-speaking world of his childhood. In his book The German People: A Social Portrait to 1914, Lowie took a cautious approach and stressed his ignorance of what was going on in his country of origin at this time. Once the war ended, Lowie made several short trips to Germany.

== Influences ==
Together with Alfred Kroeber, Lowie was one of the first generation of students of Franz Boas. His theoretical orientation was within the Boasian mainstream of anthropological thought, emphasizing cultural relativism and opposed to the cultural evolutionism of the Victorian era. Like many prominent anthropologists at the time, including Boas, his scholarship originated in the school of German idealism and romanticism espoused by earlier thinkers such as Kant, Georg Hegel and Johann Gottfried Herder. Lowie, somewhat stronger than his mentor Boas, emphasized historical components and the element of variability in his works. For him, cultures were not finished constructs, but always changing and he stressed the idea that cultures could interact.

In 1919, Lowie published Primitive Society, which "criticized the hypothetical reconstruction of the stages of the evolution of civilization as postulated by Lewis H. Morgan". The book has been seen as a key text in the promotion of theories of social organization in anthropology, being praised by Alfred Reginald Radcliffe-Brown and Bronisław Malinowski. It was also the work that inspired Claude Lévi-Strauss to shift his intellectual interest from philosophy to anthropology.

== Kinship ==
Lowie influenced the discipline of social anthropology through his use of a system to distinguish kinship relationships: he identified four main systems, which differed based on the names of the relatives of the first ascending generation, i.e. the parent generation. His Classification Scheme was slightly modified by George P. Murdock, who divided one of Lowie's four systems into a further three types.

== Honours ==
Lowie was given honorary membership of a number of societies, such as the Royal Anthropological Institute of Great Britain, the Instituto do Cerara in Brazil, the American Philosophical Society and the New York Academy of Science.

Lowie was president of the American Folklore Society from 1916 to 1917. He twice served as editor of the American Anthropologist. He was elected to the National Academy of Sciences in 1931 and served as chairman of the Division of Anthropology and Psychology of the National Research Council.

== Writings ==
His principal works include:

- Societies of the Arikara Indians (1914)
- Dances and Societies of the Plains Shoshones (1915)
- Notes on the social Organization and Customs of the Mandan, Hidatsa and Crow Indians (1917)
- Culture and Ethnology (1917)
- Plains Indian Age Societies (1917)
- Myths and Traditions of the Crow Indians (1918)
- The Matrilineal Complex (1919)
- Primitive Society (1919)
- The religion of the Crow Indians (1922)
- The Material Culture of the Crow Indians (1922)
- Crow Indian Art (1922)
- Psychology and Anthropology of Races (1923)
- Primitive Religion (1924)
- The Origin of the State (1927)
- The Crow Indians (1935)
- History of Ethnological Theory (1937)
- The German People (1945)
- Social Organization (1948)
- Towards Understanding Germany (1954)
- Robert H. Lowie, Ethnologist; A Personal Record (1959)
