= Tukudeka =

Tukudeka Mountain Sheepeaters
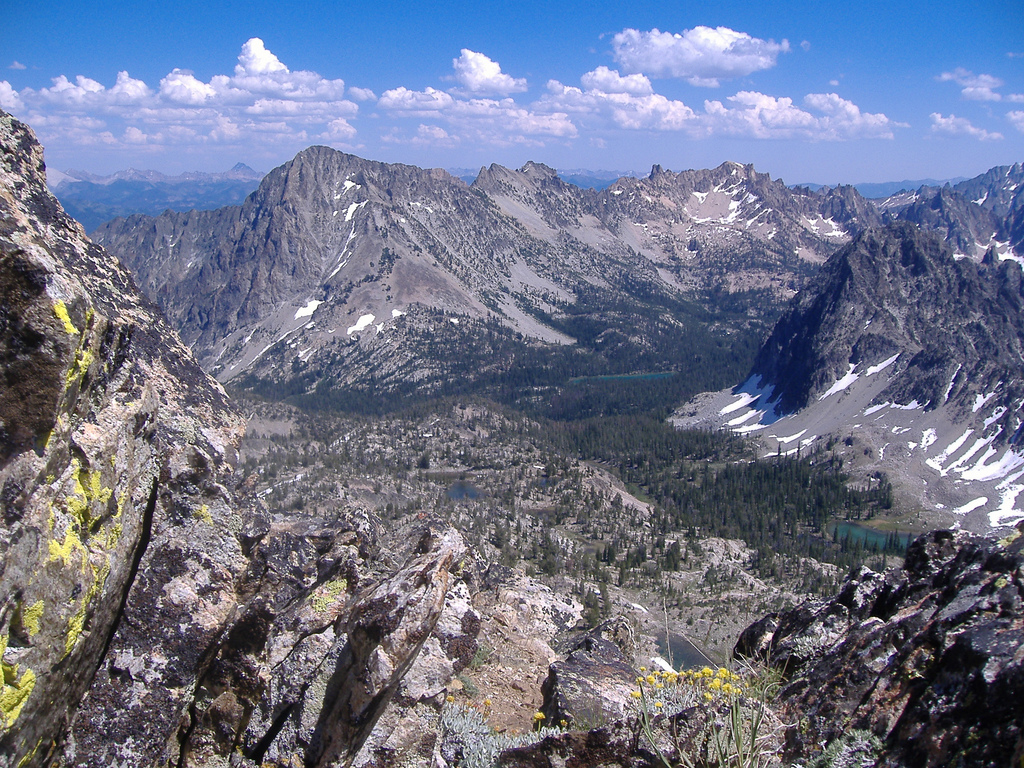
- Sawtooth Range, the traditional home of the Tukudeka in central Idaho

Total population
- Fewer than 5,822

Regions with significant populations
- United States (Idaho)

Languages
- Shoshone, English

Religion
- Native American Church, Sun Dance, traditional tribal religion, Christianity, Ghost Dance

Related ethnic groups
- Other Shoshone tribes, Bannock, Northern Paiute

The Tukudeka or Mountain Sheepeaters are a band of Shoshone within the Eastern Shoshone and the Northern Shoshone. Before the reservation era, they traditionally lived in the central Sawtooth Range of Idaho and the mountains of what is now northwest Wyoming. Bands were very fluid and nomadic, and they often interacted with and intermarried other bands of Shoshone. Today the Tukudeka are enrolled in the federally recognized Shoshone-Bannock Tribes of the Fort Hall Reservation of Idaho and the Eastern Shoshone of the Wind River Indian Reservation in Wyoming.

== Name ==
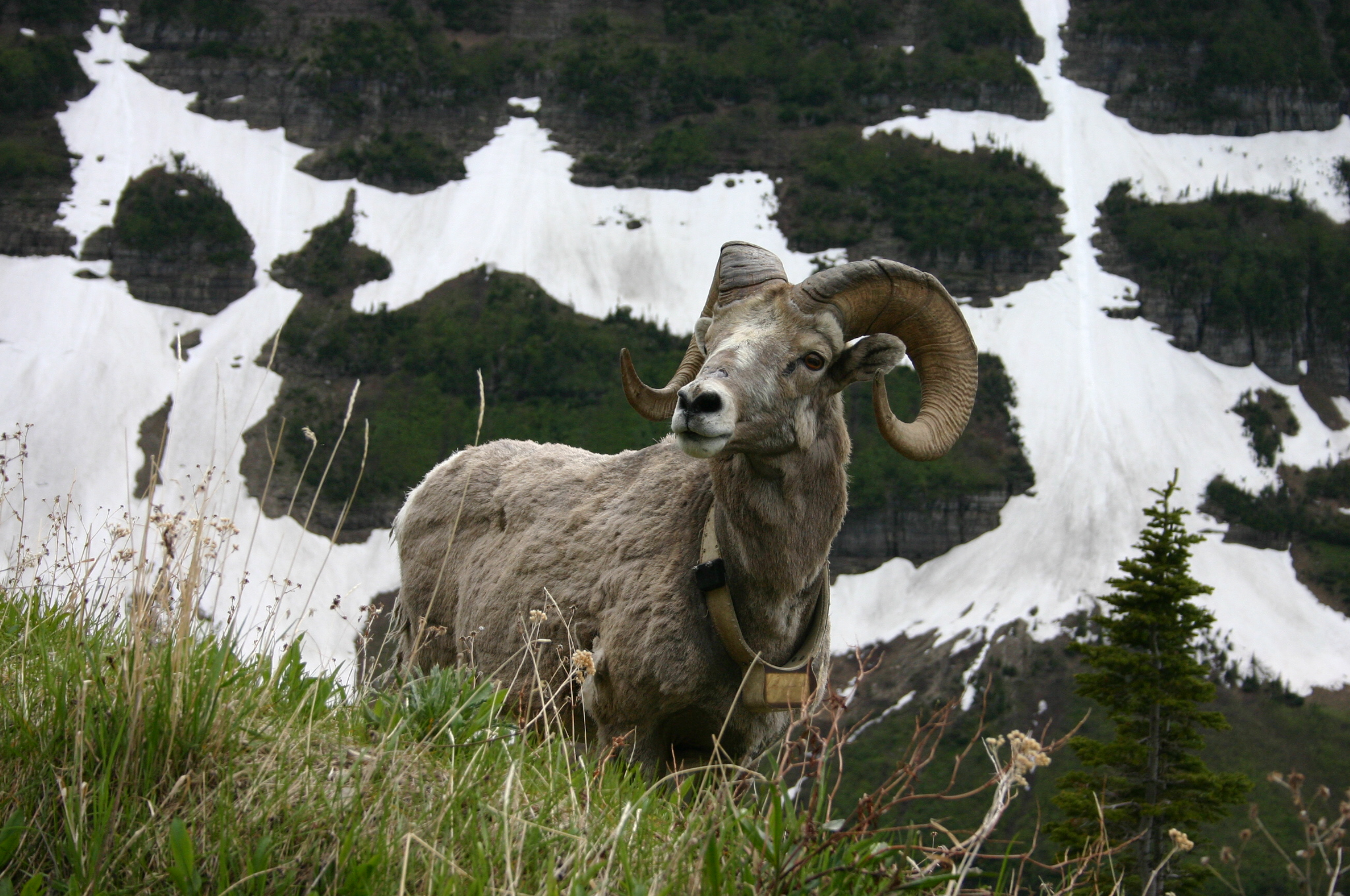
Bighorn sheep, or Ovis canadensis, traditional food source for the Tukudeka

"Tukudeka" is spelled several ways, including Tukadüka, Tukudika, Tukku Tikka'a, Tukkuikka, Tukkutikka, and Tukuarika, and is translated as "Eaters of White Meat," "Eaters of Mountain Sheep," "Mountain Sheepeaters," or simply, "Sheepeaters." A Shoshone word for bighorn ram is duku, which also translates to "meat" according to anthropologist Demetri Shimkin. So the name may also mean "eaters of meat." They were named for the bighorn mountain sheep (Ovis canadensis), which they commonly hunted. They are also called Mountain Shoshone or Toyahini, the mountaineers.

== Language ==
The Tukudeka speak the Shoshone language, as well as English. Shoshone is a Central Numic language in the Northern Uto-Aztecan language family.

== History ==
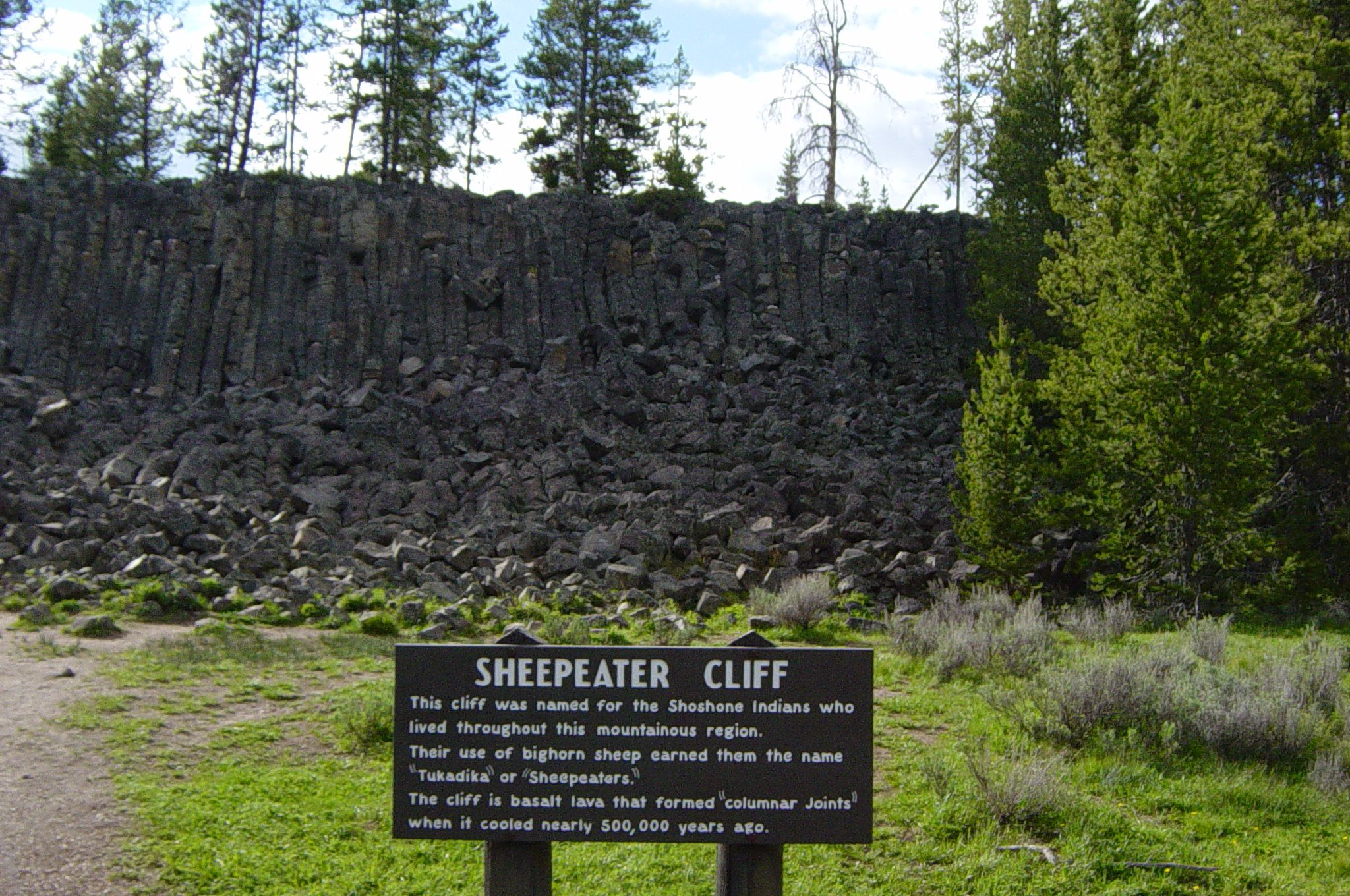
Sign at Sheepeater Cliff, Wyoming

The Tukudeka's traditional homelands were along the Salmon River in the Sawtooth Mountains, as well as southern Montana, and Yellowstone in Wyoming. Europeans first entered their territory in 1824. American and British trappers hunted beavers in the 1840s. In 1860, gold was discovered, and non-native prospectors flooded the region.

In the 1860s, Indian agents estimated the Tukudeka and Lemhi Shoshone, to be 1,200.

In 1879 five Chinese miners were killed near Loon Creek. Despite a lack of evidence, the Tukudeka were blamed for the murders, and the US Cavalry attacked the tribe in what would be called the Sheepeater War. Fifty-one Tukudeka were captured and relocated to the Fort Hall Reservation.

== Historical interpretations and myths ==
In 1913, Billings, Montana dentist W.F. "Doc" Allen claimed to have found the last-living Sheepeater living among the Crow Tribe, a 115-year-old woman whom he communicated with in sign language. His book The Sheepeaters was later considered by later anthropologist Ake Hultkrantz to be almost entirely fabricated, and a source of myths and folklore describing the Tukudika as impoverished pygmies without guns or horses. A similarly fraudulent book, Trapper Jim's Fables of Sheepeater Indians in Yellowstone, was the only book about Natives available in Yellowstone Park gift shops in the early 20th century, although its contents were entirely fictional. Early administrators of Yellowstone described the Sheepeaters as simple in technology and diminutive in stature and intelligence.

In contrast, when fur trapper Osborne Russell encountered a band of Tukudika in what is now Yellowstone in 1834, he found them to be well-clothed, accompanied by pack-dogs, and possessing a quantity of skins for trading: "Here we found a few Snake Indians comprising 6 men, 7 women, and 8 or 10 children who were the only inhabitants of this lonely spot. They were all neatly clothed in dressed deer and Sheep skins of the best quality and all seemed to be perfectly contented and happy. ... Their personal property consisted of one old butcher knife nearly worn to the back, two old, shattered fusees which had long since become useless for want of ammunition, a small stone pot and about thirty dogs on which they carried their skins, clothing, provisions, etc., on their hunting excursions. They were well armed with bows and arrows pointed with obsidian. The bows were beautifully wrought from sheep, buffalo and elk horns, secured with deer and elk sinews, and ornamented with porcupine quills, and generally about three feet long. We obtained a large number of deer, elk and sheep skins from them of the finest quality, and three large, neatly dressed panther skins, in return for awls and axes, kettles, tobacco, ammunition, etc. ... One of them drew a map of the country around us on a white elk skin with a piece of charcoal, after which he explained the direction of the different passes, streams, etc." The Tukudeka are considered to have developed various complex practices to survive the difficult winter conditions of northwestern Wyoming.

The Tukudika economy was largely derived from the large numbers of mountain sheep that the Tukudika were expert at hunting, whether with their sheep horn bows, or with corral traps in the shape of a spiral. They also consumed fish caught in the mountain streams using weirs.

In contrast to the horse-mounted buffalo-hunting Shoshone, the Tukudika did not rely on horses. Their pedestrian way of life was well-suited for spending summer at high-elevations where migratory animals like bighorn sheep, elk, and deer abounded, and they could also harvest calorie-rich edible plants like white bark pine nuts. The lifestyle meant they weren't limited to plains areas where they needed large numbers of horses or forage to graze the horses. In contrast, horse-mounted Shoshones were much more dependent on bison hunting on the plains, which offered a major source of wealth for trade, but was also a resource that other tribes coveted, leading to conflict through much of the 1800s. The Tukudika were smaller in numbers than the other Shoshone, but judging by Russel's account lived a prosperous life by relying on a variety of food resources.

The Sheepeater were potentially subject to misidentification by the 1860s and 1870s, with the Cook-Folsom expedition and the Raynolds expedition describing horse-mounted Bannock-speaking Indians as Sheepeaters.

In 1870, Wind River Indian Reservation agent G.W. Fleming stated that Chief Washakie allowed a band of "Toorooreka" Sheepeaters to share in the annual annuity. This likely represents the period when the Wyoming Tukudika merged with the Washakie band of the Eastern Shoshone to reside on the Wind River Indian Reservation. Later anthropologists Are Hultkrantz and Demetri Shimkin reported that members of the Tukudika formed an enclave within the Trout Creek area near Fort Washakie.

Early Yellowstone National Park Superintendent Norris claimed that the Sheepeater were the only year-round residents of Yellowstone National Park. Writer Susan Hughes doubts that the Sheepeaters could have live year-round in the park due to snow levels. She also points out to the fact that Jones expedition guide Togote, a Tukudika who is namesake of Togwotee Pass, was only familiar with the southern portion of Yellowstone Park, as evidence that Sheepeaters didn't live year-round in Yellowstone. However, archaeological studies have shown that the Tukudika alternated between living in wickiups in the summer and rock caves in the winter; both types of dwelling have been documented within Yellowstone.

Since Tukudika were aware migratory patterns of deer and elk and bighorn sheep, they likely migrated out of high elevations to spend winter at the mouth of mountain canyons where they spill out to the plains, or in the basins themselves. Some big game wintering areas, such as Sunlight Basin and the upper Wind River Valley, are nearly snow-free in winter. Other recent excavations have suggested that certain snow-free areas within the Wind River Range may have been used by Indians in mid-winter for up to 12,000 years.

== Technology ==
The Tukudika are known for three innovations: the steatite or soapstone cooking pot, the corral trap for hunting bighorn sheep, and the sheep horn bow.

In the Wind River Range and Absaroka Ranges of Wyoming, Tukudika used a cooking pot carved out of soft soapstone. The pot could hold up to a gallon, and be placed directly in the fire. Because of the high-specific heat of soapstone, the pot could be pulled out of the fire and maintain boiling temperatures for some time. Tukudika quarries of soap stone were found in the Wind River Range.

Bighorn sheep corral traps relied on a deep understanding of bighorn sheep behavior. The Tukudika built traps in the Wind River Range and the Abaroka Range which were shaped in spirals (shaped something like a bighorn sheep horn) with the opening to the trap facing downhill. The traps were located on slopes near bighorn sheep summer range. Hunters would approach the sheep from above, then spook the animals downhill. Since sheep have an instinct to find security at high ground, the sheep would run downhill, then traverse the slope, before running uphill again. With luck, this movement of the animals would direct them straight into the mouth of a corral trap, usually constructed out of logs. The hunters would then spook the animals further into the narrowing part of the spiral trap, with the assistance of a ceremonial leader stationed in a pod along one of the corral walls. At the end of the trap, the sheep would run up a ramp into an elevated cattle-guard-like trap, with widely spaced timbers. They would fall off the timbers, with their feet hanging into air. Thus immobilized, the hunters would kill the sheep with clubs, spears, or projectiles. Some of these traps were used through the 1800s, with the remains still visible in the late 20th century. Tukudika also hunted sheep by driving them into deep drifts of spring snow.

Shoshones in bighorn sheep habitat manufactured the sheephorn bow over a period of two to three months by boiling and straightening the spiral horn of the bighorn sheep. In geothermal areas, hot springs may have served to heat the horn. The horn would be shaped over time and backed with sinew. When completed, this bow was shorter but also much more powerful than bows made out of wood, boasting a pull strength of up to 70 pounds. Horn bows fetched a high price in trade value of five to ten horses. The bow is one of the most powerful bows created by indigenous people in North America.
