= Sheep Mountain Range Archeological District =

Archaeological site

- U.S. National Register of Historic Places
- U.S. Historic district
- Location: restricted
- Nearest city: Las Vegas, Nevada
- MPS: district
- NRHP reference No.: 74001145
- Added to NRHP: December 31, 1974

Sheep Mountain Range Archeological District is an archeological site, located in Clark County, Nevada, and listed on the National Register of Historic Places. The site is currently an underwater conservation area.

Archeologist W. Geoffrey Spaulding discovered yucca remains and macrofossils of piñon nuts (Pinus monophylla) at the site in pack rat waste that date between 1990–5210 BP.

== See also ==
- Clovis culture
- Indigenous peoples of the Great Basin
