= Sheepeater Cliff =

Rock formation in the United States

- Cliff
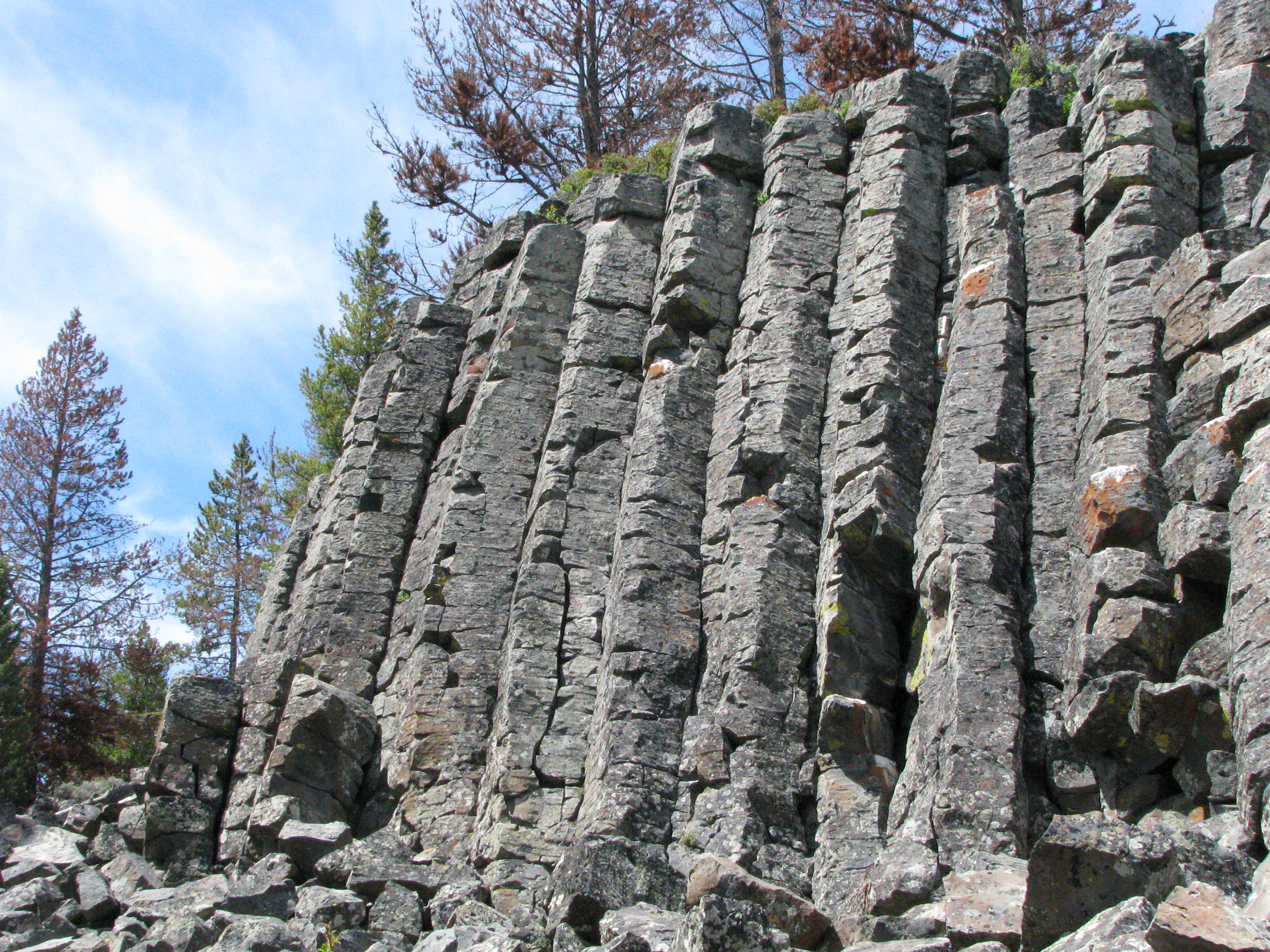
- Columnar basalt at Sheepeater Cliff
- Interactive map of Sheepeater Cliff
- Coordinates: 44.891087°N 110.729635°W
- Location: Yellowstone National Park, Wyoming, USA
- Age: 280,000 ± 75,000 years
- Etymology: Named after a band of Eastern Shoshone known as Tukuaduka ("sheep eaters")

The Sheepeater Cliffs are a series of exposed cliffs made up of columnar basalt in Yellowstone National Park in the United States.

The lava was deposited about 200–300,000 years ago by an extinct volcano which now sits on the opposite side of the Grand Loop Road. It was later exposed by the Gardner River. The cliffs are noted as a textbook example of a basaltic flow with well defined joints and hexagonal columns. Many of the exposed cliffs are located along a steep inaccessible canyon cut by the Gardner near Bunsen Peak, but some of the cliffs located just off the Grand Loop Road can be reached by car.

The name "Sheepeater Cliffs" was originally applied to the basalt cliffs in the area now called Sheepeater Canyon, the home of Gardner River and the Osprey Falls. In autumn 1879, P.W. Norris descended into the canyon and noted "scattered fire-brands and decaying lodge-poles", evidence that the Native band called the "sheep eaters" (Tukudeka) had recently inhabited the area. This description seems to imply active settlement and that Norris was actively chasing the tribe out of the park. Norris described the Sheepeater settlement in the canyon as follows:

[I]t is mainly carpeted with short grass, dotted, fringed, and overhung with small pines, firs and cedars, and, with the subdued and mingled murmur of the rapids and cataracts above and below it and laughing ripple of the gliding stream, is truly an enchanting dell; a wind and storm sheltered refuge for the feeble remnant of a fading race, who, from evident traces, have certainly hidden here since we have occupied the Mammoth Hot Springs in utter ignorance of their proximity, although less than 6 miles distant.

A trail was eventually built along the top of the canyon, and the name "Sheepeater Cliffs" came to also apply to the visible basalt structures near the trailhead. When they were active in the park, the Tukudeka themselves had placed far more cultural value on Obsidian Cliff to the south, where they would make offerings before mining for obsidian as a valuable trade good.
