= Pocatello (Shoshone leader) =

Native American leader (1815–1884)

- Tondzaosha
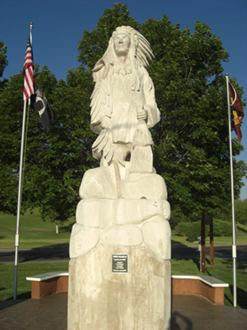
- Statue of Chief Pocatello, sculpted by J.D. Adcox

Northern Shoshone leader

Personal details
- Born: 1815
- Died: October 1884 (aged 68–69)
- Known for: Namesake of city of Pocatello, Idaho

Chief Pocatello (known in the Shoshoni language as Tondzaosha (Buffalo Robe); 1815 – October 1884) was a leader of the Northern Shoshone, a Native American people of the Great Basin in western North America. He led attacks against early settlers during a time of increasing strife between settlers and Native Americans. After making peace with the U.S. Government, he moved his people to their present reservation in Idaho and led the Shoshone during their struggle to survive following their deportation. The city of Pocatello is named in his honor.

== Biography ==
Pocatello was born 1815. He was the leader at the time of the United States' arrival into Utah in the late 1840s. In the 1850s, he led a series of attacks against emigrant parties in the Utah Territory and along the Oregon Trail. He gained a reputation among Mormon leaders and Indian agents as a leader of a band of Native Americans. Brigham Young, the leader of the Mormons, attempted a policy of reconciliation and appeasement of the Shoshone, but the arrival of the United States Army in the Utah Territory in 1858 exacerbated tensions between the emigrants and the Shoshone.

In January 1863, Pocatello received advance notice of the advance of U.S. Army troops from Fort Douglas under Colonel Patrick Edward Connor, who had set out to "chastise" the Shoshone. Pocatello was able to lead his people out of harm's way from the Army, thus avoiding the catastrophe of the Bear River Massacre. Pocatello sued for peace after pursuit from the Army. Pocatello agreed to cease his attacks on Oregon Trail emigrants and southeast Idaho settlers if the government would provide compensation for the game and land preempted by these intruders on the tribe's ancestral territory. With the Fort Bridger Treaty of 1868, the chief agreed to relocate his people to the Fort Hall Indian Reservation along the Snake River. Although the U.S. government had promised $5,000 in annual supplies, the relief rarely arrived, forcing continuing suffering and struggle among the Shoshone.

In 1875, faced with starvation among his people, Pocatello led them to the Mormon missionary farm of George Hill in Corinne, Utah, with the hope that a mass conversion of his people to Mormonism would alleviate his people's suffering. Although the missionaries willingly baptized the Shoshone, the local population of white settlers did not receive the Shoshone openly and agitated for their expulsion. In response, the U.S. Army forced the Shoshone to return to the Fort Hall Reservation.

In the late 1870s Pocatello granted a right-of-way to Jay Gould to extend the Utah and Northern Railway across the Fort Hall Indian Reservation. The extension of the railroad was motivated by the increasing flood of settlers into the Idaho Territory following the discovery of gold.

After his death in 1884, Pocatello's body was interred in a deep spring in Idaho along with his clothing, guns, knives, and hunting equipment. Eighteen horses were also slaughtered and put into the spring on top of his body.

== Name ==
In 1918, John E. Rees published a list of Idaho place names called Idaho Nomenclature. His derivation of Pokatello included po "road," ka "not," and tello "to follow," and Rees offered the meaning "he does not follow the road," referring to the chief's "stealthy habits and thieving raids." An earlier reference to Pocataro occurred in 1859, when F. W. Lander, Superintendent of the U.S. Overland Wagon Road, met Chief Pocatello and arranged his release from U.S. Army custody. Linguist Sven Liljeblad believed that Lander's encounter with Chief Pocatello was the first reference to the name. Liljeblad refuted John Rees' syllabic derivation of the name, reasoning that Rees had simply connected unrelated Shoshoni roots. Liljeblad concluded that Pocatello was not even a Shoshoni word. Chief Pocatello's daughter, Jeanette Lewis, confirmed that the name had no meaning in the Shoshoni language, and that the chief referred to himself as Tondzaosha, meaning "buffalo robe."

== In popular culture ==
Pocatello appears in Sid Meier's Civilization V as the playable leader of the Shoshone Civilization.
