= Indigenous peoples of the Great Basin =

Cultural classification of Native Americans

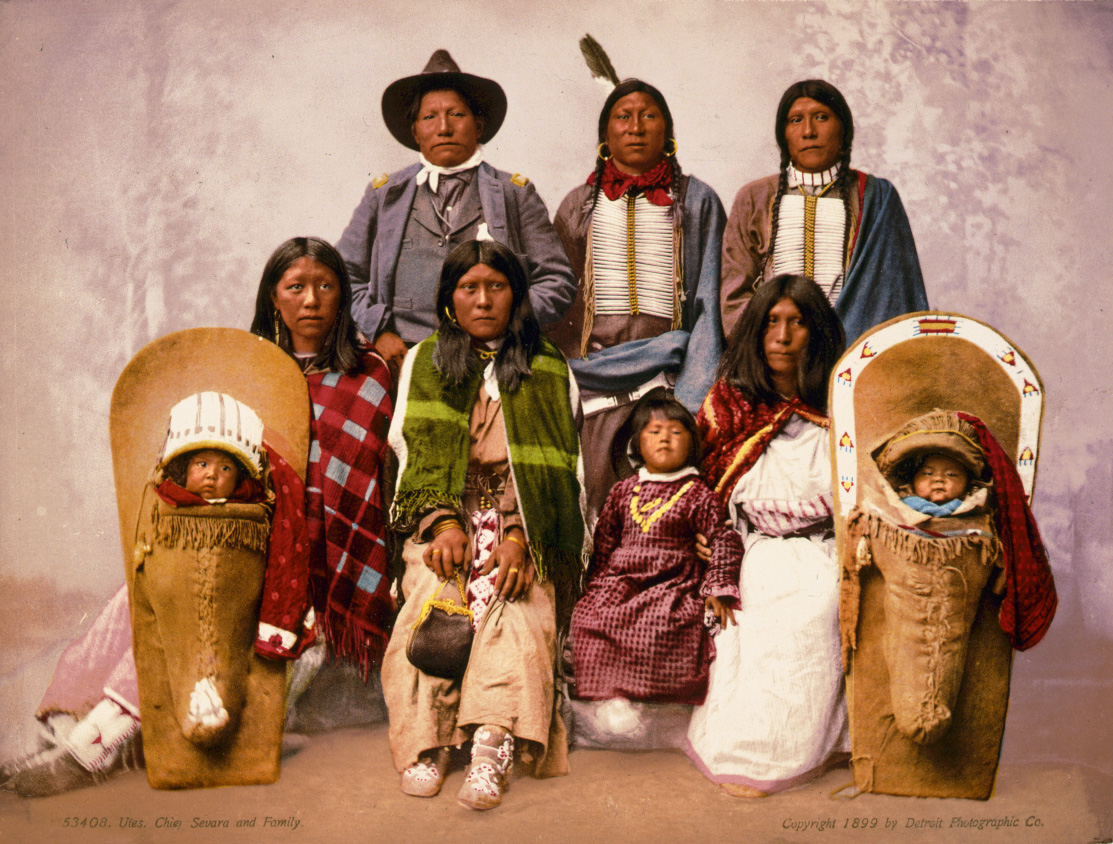
Ute chief Severo and his family 1899

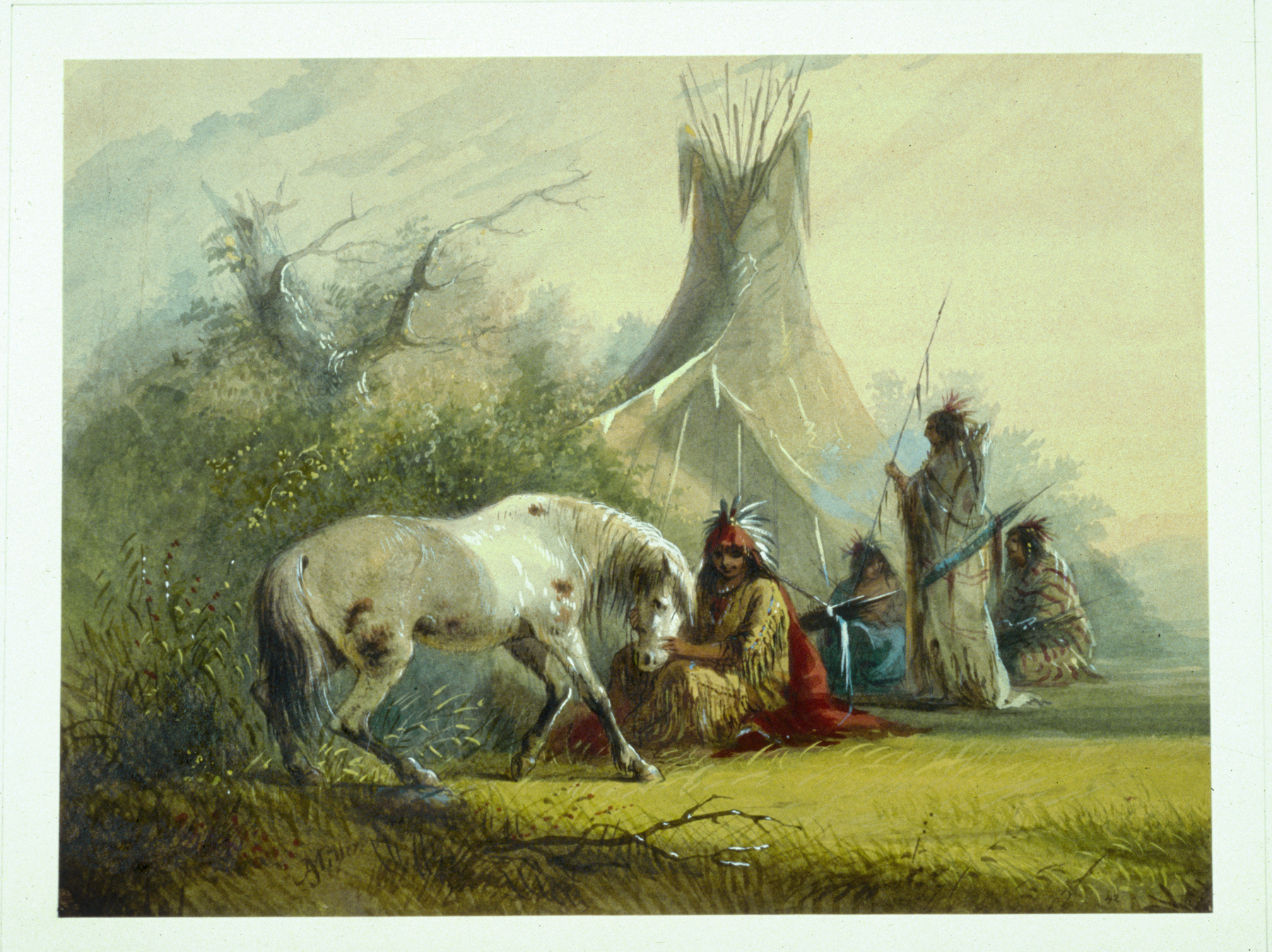
Shoshone Indian and his horse

The Indigenous peoples of the Great Basin are Native Americans of the northern Great Basin, Snake River Plain, and upper Colorado River basin. The "Great Basin" is a cultural classification of Indigenous peoples of the Americas and a cultural region located between the Rocky Mountains and the Sierra Nevada, in what is now Nevada, and parts of Oregon, California, Idaho, Wyoming, and Utah. The Great Basin region at the time of European contact was ~400,000 sq mi (1,000,000 km^{2}). There is very little precipitation in the Great Basin area which affects the lifestyles and cultures of the inhabitants.

== Great Basin peoples ==
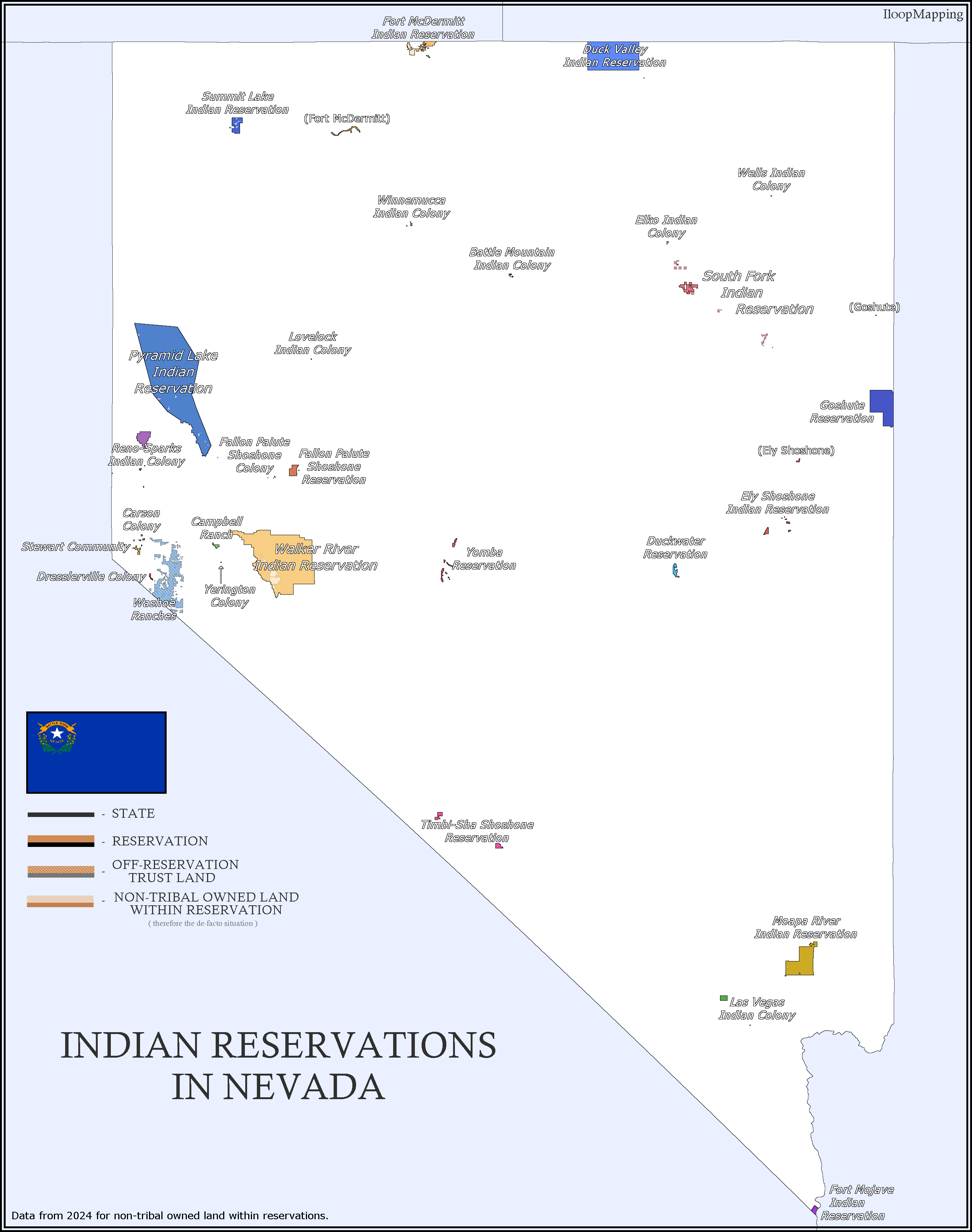
Map of the Indian reservations in Nevada.

- Fremont culture (400 CE–1300 CE), Utah
- Kawaiisu, southern inland California
- Timbisha or Panamint or Koso, southeastern California
- Washo, Nevada and California
  - Palagewan
  - Pahkanapil

=== Northern Paiute ===
- Northern Paiute, eastern California, Nevada, Oregon, southwestern Idaho
  - Kucadikadi, Mono Lake Paiute, California
- Bannock, Idaho

=== Mono ===
- Mono, southeastern California
  - Eastern Mono (Owens Valley Paiute), southeastern California
  - Western Mono, southeastern California

=== Southern Paiute ===
- Southern Paiute, Arizona, Nevada, Utah
  - Chemehuevi, southeastern California
  - Kaibab, northwestern Arizona
  - Kaiparowits, southwestern Utah
  - Moapa, southern Nevada
  - Panaca
  - Panguitch, Utah
  - Paranigets, southern Nevada
  - Shivwits, southwestern Utah

=== Shoshone ===
- Eastern Shoshone people:

- Guchundeka', Kuccuntikka, Buffalo Eaters
- Tukkutikka, Tukudeka, Mountain Sheep Eaters, joined the Northern Shoshone
- Boho'inee', Pohoini, Pohogwe, Sage Grass people, Sagebrush Butte People

- Northern Shoshone people:

- Agaideka, Salmon Eaters, Lemhi, Snake River and Lemhi River Valley
- Doyahinee', Mountain people
- Kammedeka, Kammitikka, Jack Rabbit Eaters, Snake River, Great Salt Lake
- Hukundüka, Porcupine Grass Seed Eaters, Wild Wheat Eaters, possibly synonymous with Kammitikka
- Tukudeka, Dukundeka', Sheep Eaters (Mountain Sheep Eaters), Sawtooth Range, Idaho
- Yahandeka, Yakandika, Groundhog Eaters, lower Boise, Payette, and Weiser Rivers

- Western Shoshone people:

- Kusiutta, Goshute (Gosiute), Great Salt Desert and Great Salt Lake, Utah

- Cedar Valley Goshute
- Deep Creek Goshute
- Rush Valley Goshute
- Skull Valley Goshute, Wipayutta, Weber Ute
- Tooele Valley Goshute
- Trout Creek Goshute

- Kuyatikka, Kuyudikka, Bitterroot Eaters, Halleck, Mary's River, Clover Valley, Smith Creek Valley, Nevada
- Mahaguadüka, Mentzelia Seed Eaters, Ruby Valley, Nevada
- Painkwitikka, Penkwitikka, Fish Eaters, Cache Valley, Idaho and Utah
- Pasiatikka, Redtop Grass Eaters, Deep Creek Gosiute, Deep Creek Valley, Antelope Valley
- Tipatikka, Pinenut Eaters, northernmost band
- Tsaiduka, Tule Eaters, Railroad Valley, Nevada
- Tsogwiyuyugi, Elko, Nevada
- Waitikka, Ricegrass Eaters, Ione Valley, Nevada
- Watatikka, Ryegrass Seed Eaters, Ruby Valley, Nevada
- Wiyimpihtikka, Buffalo Berry Eaters

=== Ute ===
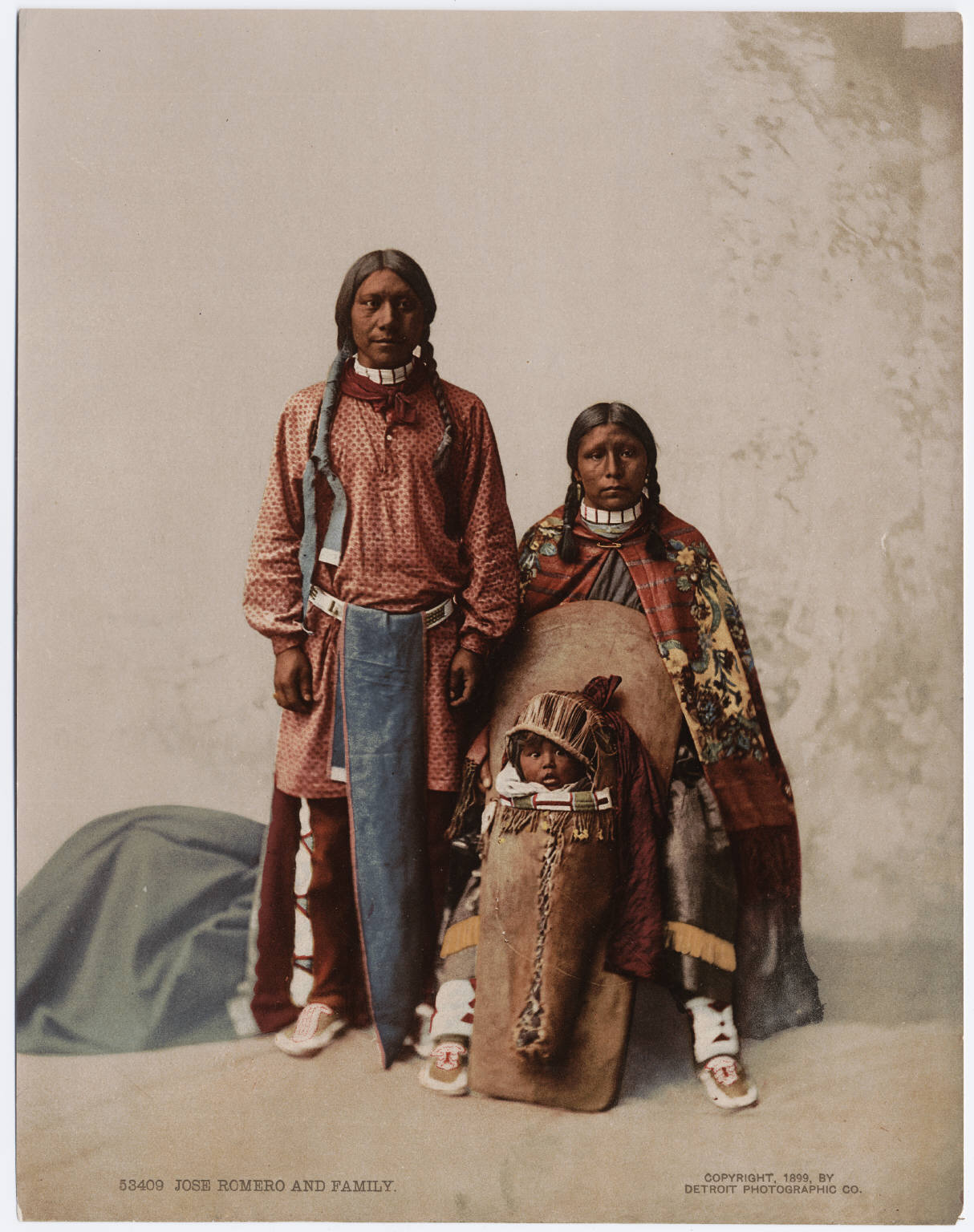
Jose Romero and family, all Ute, photochrome postcard

- Northern Ute
  - San Pitch, central Utah
  - Seuvarits, Moah Utah area
  - Timpanogos, north central Utah
  - Uncompahgre (Tabeguache), central and northern Colorado
  - Uintah
  - White River Utes, Colorado and eastern Utah
    - Parianuche, along Colorado River valley in central and western Colorado
      - Sabuagana, along Colorado River valley in central and western Colorado
    - Yampa
- Southern Ute
  - Capote, southeastern Colorado and New Mexico
  - Muache, south and central Colorado
- Ute Mountain
  - Weeminuche, western Colorado, eastern Utah, northwestern New Mexico
- Merged into the Paiute Indian Tribe of Utah
  - Moanunts, Salina, Utah
  - Pahvant, western Utah

== History ==
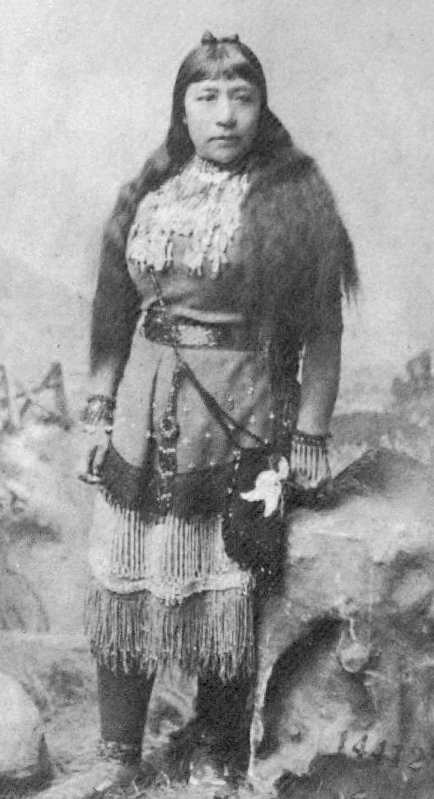
Sarah Winnemucca a Northern Paiute writer and activist

The Great Basin has been occupied by people since prehistoric North America, around 10,000 years ago. The earliest evidence of people in the Great Basin is from projectile points found that were dated pre-clovis from over 13,000 years ago. They lived into the Archaic period, where people were mainly hunter and gatherers. Prehistoric people of the Great Basin were believed to be big game hunters, hunting large animals of the time such as mammoths. They lived in rock shelters and began hunting smaller game and gathering more, seen by the decline of projectile points and also the extinction of many large animals during the time.

During the Archaic period, people began to adopt agricultural like domesticating crops such as beans and squash, developing irrigation systems. Soon after, people of the Great Basin adopted practices from Fremont Culture, and started to domesticate maize, build pit-houses, and make ceramics. Dart points are still dated back to this time, and hunting is still prevalent in this late archaic period, as well as the start of sedentary lifestyle adopted by post-archaic tribes. In the Numic language-speakers, ancestors of today's Western Shoshone and both Northern Paiute people and Southern Paiute people entered the region around the 14th century CE.

The first Europeans to document their encounters with Native groups in the Great Basin was Juan María Antonio de Rivera's expedition in 1765. Rivera led two expeditions from Santa Fe that year, the first departing sometime in June. Rivera's party camped with Paiutes on the Dolores River in July, and returned to Santa Fe for supplies. His second expedition departed Santa Fe in late September and went considerably farther, crossing the Colorado just south of present-day Moab, Utah. Rivera's diaries greatly influenced the Domínguez–Escalante expedition, which set off 11 years later in 1776 and passed far from present day Delta, Utah. Great Basin settlement was relatively free of non-Native settlers until the first Mormon settlers arrived in 1847. Within ten years, the first Indian reservation was established, in order to assimilate the Native people in the area. The Goshute Reservation was created in 1863. The attempted acculturation process included sending children to Indian schools and limiting the landbases and resources of the reservations.

Because their contact with European-Americans and African-Americans occurred comparatively late, Great Basin tribes maintain their religion and culture and were leading proponents of 19th century cultural and religious renewals. Two Paiute prophets, Wodziwob and Wovoka, introduced the Ghost Dance in a ceremony to commune with departed loved ones and bring renewal of buffalo herds and precontact lifeways. The Ute Bear Dance emerged on the Great Basin. The Sun Dance and Peyote religion flourished in the Great Basin, as well.

In 1930, the Ely Shoshone Reservation was established, followed by the Duckwater Indian Reservation in 1940.

Conditions for the Native American population of the Great Basin were erratic throughout the 20th century. Economic improvement emerged as a result of President Franklin Roosevelt's Indian New Deal in the 1930s, while activism and legal victories in the 1970s have improved conditions significantly. Nevertheless, the communities struggled against with poverty and low employment.

Today self-determination, beginning with the 1975 passage of the Indian Self-determination and Education Assistance Act, has enabled Great Basin tribes to develop economic opportunities for their members.

== Cultures ==
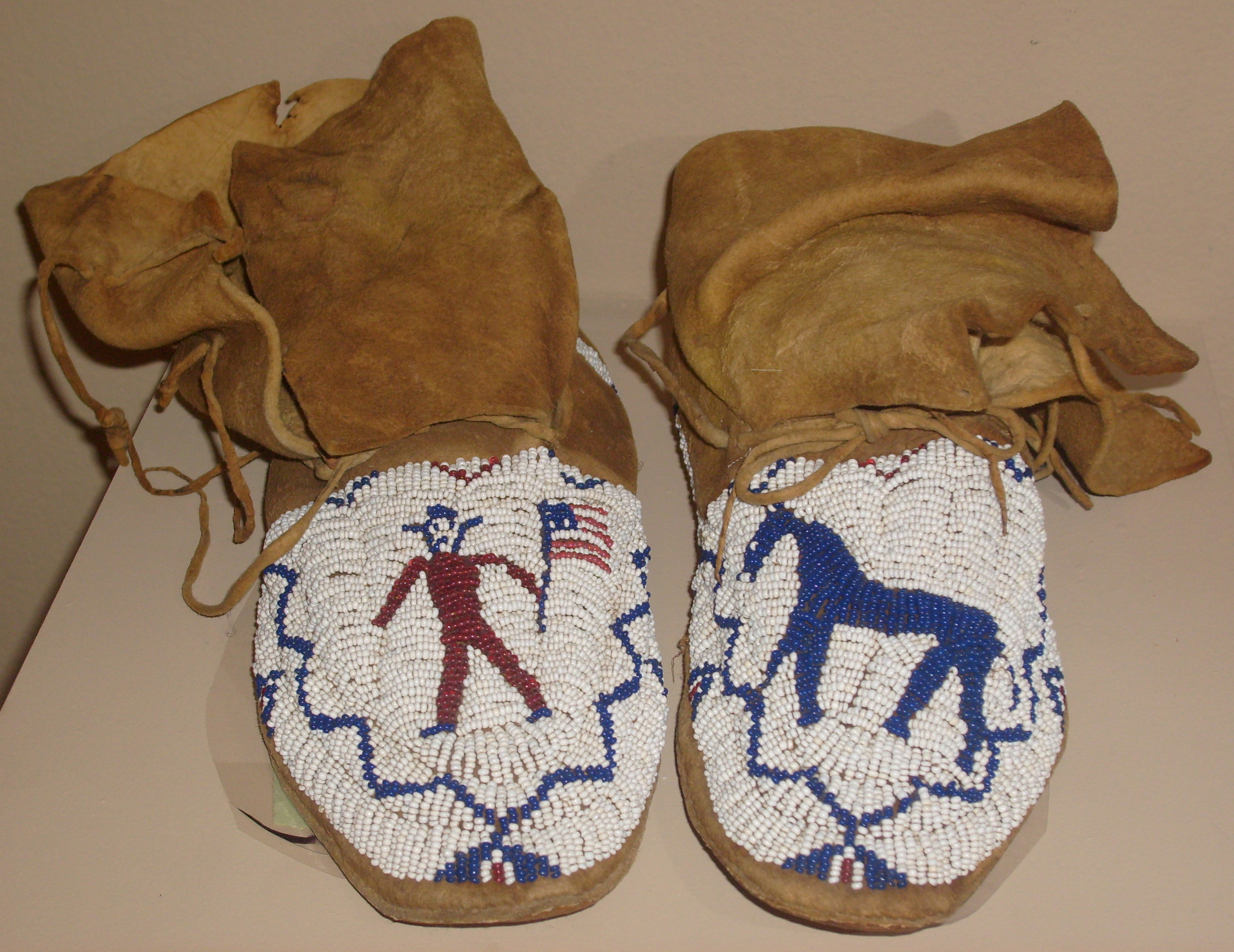
Beaded moccasins that belonged to Chief Washakie (Shoshone), Wyoming, c. 1900

Different ethnic groups of Great Basin tribes share certain common cultural elements that distinguish them from surrounding groups. All but the Washoe traditionally speak Numic languages, and tribal groups, who historically lived peacefully and often shared common territories, have intermingled considerably. Prior to the 20th century, Great Basin peoples were predominantly hunters and gatherers.

"Desert Archaic" or more simply "The Desert Culture" refers to the culture of the Great Basin tribes. This culture is characterized by the need for mobility to take advantage of seasonally available food supplies. The use of pottery was rare due to its weight, but intricate baskets were woven for containing water, cooking food, winnowing grass seeds, and storage, including the storage of pine nuts, a Paiute-Shoshone staple. Heavy items such as metates would be cached rather than carried from foraging area to foraging area. Agriculture was not practiced within the Great Basin itself, although it was practiced in adjacent areas (modern agriculture in the Great Basin requires either large mountain reservoirs or deep artesian wells). Likewise, the Great Basin tribes had no permanent settlements, although winter villages might be revisited winter after winter by the same group of families. In the summer, the largest group was usually the nuclear family due to the low density of food supplies.

In the early historical period, the Great Basin tribes were actively expanding to the north and east, where they developed a horse-riding bison-hunting culture. These people, including the Bannock and Eastern Shoshone, share traits with Plains Indians.

Today, the Great Basin Native Artists, which was cofounded by Melissa Melero-Moose and Ben Aleck represents Indigenous visual artists from the region and curates groups exhibitions.
