= Lemhi Shoshone =

Tribe of Northern Shoshone

Lemhi Shoshone Akaitikka
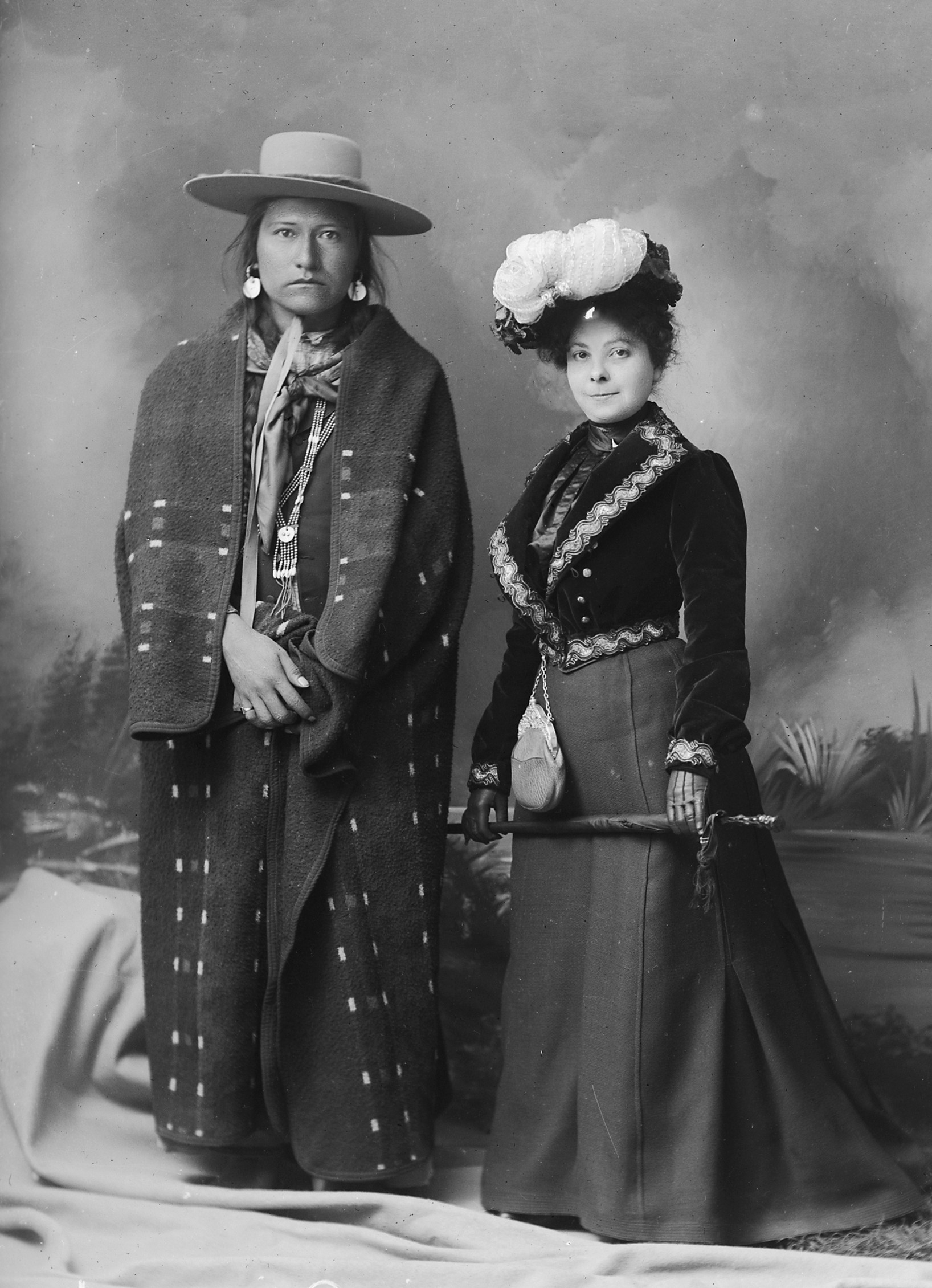

Total population
- Fewer than 5,300

Regions with significant populations
- United States ( Idaho)

Languages
- Shoshone, English

Religion
- Native American Church, Sun Dance, traditional tribal religion, Christianity, Ghost Dance

Related ethnic groups
- other Shoshone tribes, Bannock, Northern Paiute

The Lemhi Shoshone are a tribe of Northern Shoshone, also called the Akaitikka, Agaidika, or "Eaters of Salmon". The name "Lemhi" comes from Fort Lemhi, a Mormon mission to this group. They traditionally lived in the Lemhi River Valley and along the upper Salmon River in Idaho. Bands were very fluid and nomadic, and they often interacted with and intermarried other bands of Shoshone and other tribes, such as the Bannock. Today most of them are enrolled in the Shoshone-Bannock Tribes of the Fort Hall Reservation of Idaho.

== Traditional culture ==
The Akaitikka are Numic speakers, speaking the Shoshone language.

Fishing is an important source of food, and salmon, and trout were staples. Gooseberries and camas root, Camassia quamash are traditional vegetable foods for the Lemhi Shoshone. In the 19th century, buffalo hunting provided meat, furs, hides, and other materials.

== History ==
During the 19th century, the Lemhi Shoshone were allied with the Flatheads and enemies of the Blackfeet. The Lewis and Clark Expedition encountered the Lemhi at the Three Forks of the Missouri River in 1805. In the 1860s, Indian agents estimated the Lemhi population, which included Shoshone, Bannock, and Tukudeka (Sheepeaters), to be 1,200.

Tendoy was a prominent Lemhi chief in the mid-19th century. He was half-Shoshone and half-Bannock. He became the Lemhi's leading chief in 1863 after Tio-van-du-ah was killed in Bannock County, Idaho.

The Lemhi Reservation, located along the Lemhi River, west of the Bitterroot Range and north of the Lemhi Range was created in 1875 and terminated in 1907. Most of the residents were moved to the Fort Hall Indian Reservation. Others remain near Salmon, Idaho.

Robert Harry Lowie studied the band and published The Northern Shoshone, a monograph about them in 1909.

== Notable Lemhi ==
- Sacagawea
