= Randy'L He-dow Teton =

Shoshone model for the Sacagawea dollar coin

Randy'L He-dow Teton (born 1976) is the Shoshone woman who posed as the model for the US Sacagawea dollar coin, first issued in 2000.

== Biography ==
Randy'L He-dow Teton is a Shoshone-Bannock/Cree from the Lincoln Creek district of the Fort Hall Reservation in southeastern Idaho. She is the second oldest of five siblings and the daughter of Randy Leo Teton and Bonnie C. Wuttunee-Wadsworth (Shoshone-Cree), both members of the Shoshone-Bannock Tribe.

Her given middle name is He-dow, which is pronounced [ˈhi:do:] in the Shoshoni language and means "meadowlark" (Sturnella neglecta), while in the Northern Paiute language it means "close to ground" and is pronounced [ˈhai.ðo:].

She graduated from the University of New Mexico at 24 with a B.A. in Art History and a minor in Native American Studies.

== Sacagawea dollar ==
In 1998, the United States Mint invited sculptor Glenna Goodacre to submit a design for the new dollar coin featuring Sacagawea, the Shoshone woman who acted as guide and interpreter for the Lewis and Clark Expedition. Goodacre went to the Institute of American Indian Arts Museum in Santa Fe, New Mexico to find a Shoshone woman to model Sacagawea, since no contemporary portraits exist. Goodacre chose Teton, the daughter of a museum employee, to be the face of Sacagawea.

== Career ==
Teton toured the country extensively to promote the new dollar coin's introduction and as a motivational speaker to encourage Native American education. Teton has stated that, "the image doesn't represent me, it represents all Native American women. All women have the dignity of the Golden Dollar's image."

Teton currently serves as the public information officer for the Shoshone-Bannock Tribes in southeastern Idaho. She continues to make public appearance as Sacagawea to bring attention to American Indian and Alaska Native issues and concerns.
