= Tendoy =

Tendoy or Tendoi may refer to

- Tendoy (Shoshone leader), respected chief of the Lemhi Shoshone people
- Tendoy, Idaho, community named for the leader
- Tendoy Mountains, a small mountain range in Beaverhead County, Montana
