= Lemhi Reservation =

The Lemhi Reservation was a United States Indian Reservation for the Lemhi Shoshone from 1875 to 1907. During almost all this time their main chief was Tendoy.

The group of about 700 that the reservation was formed for in 1875 also included Sheepeater Indians and Bannocks. Tendoy himself had one Lemhi Shoshone and one Bannock parent.

On February 12, 1875, President Grant established a 100 square mile executive order reservation for Sacagawea / Sacajawea's People the Lemhi Shoshone in the Lemhi Valley. Known as the Lemhi Valley Indian Reservation, the executive order established the reserve for "the exclusive use of the mixed tribes of Shoshone, Bannock, and Sheapeater Indians. Almost from the outset, however, the government and local residents began efforts to rescind the executive order reservation. They ultimately succeeded in 1905, and in 1907 the Lemhi began what many have called the "Lemhi Trail of Tears," which saw their forced removal from their ancestral homelands to the Fort Hall Indian Reservation.

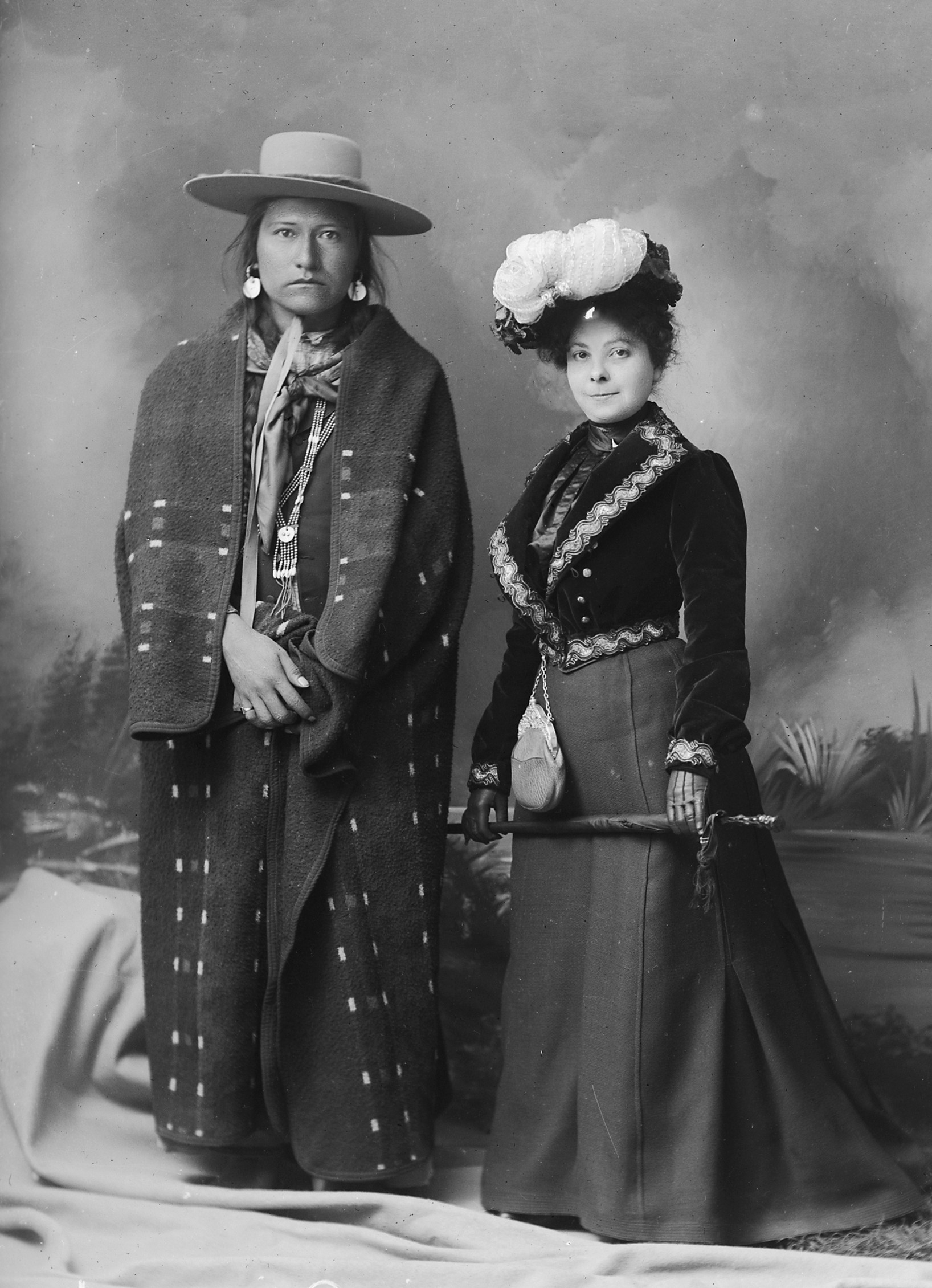
Lemhi Chief Tindoor and wife

== Historical significance of the Lemi Shoshone in the area ==
Banished from their homeland in 1907 and seeking to return ever since, the Lemhi-Shoshone people create a dilemma for the nation. As it prepares to commemorate the Bicentennial of the Lewis and Clark Corps of Discovery, the United States needs to reassess its commitment to the Lemhi-Shoshone, to Sacagawea / Sacajawea's people. The obligation the nation acknowledges toward wolf and salmon recovery efforts is dwarfed by the responsibility it faces in treating fairly the people who played such a crucial role in advancing the success of the Lewis and Clark Expedition. In August 1805, Lewis and Clark and their Corps of Discovery approached the Three Forks of the Missouri River. At Fort Mandan in October 1804, they had acquired the services of Toussaint Charbonneau and one of his wives, Sacajawea, a fifteen-year-old "Shoshone" woman who was six months pregnant. The expedition valued Charbonneau and Sacajawea for their skills as interpreters—he for his French and she for her Hidatsa and Shoshone. Sacajawea, along with several other Shoshone girls, had been captured by a Hidatsa raiding party near the Three Forks four years earlier. Living at Fort Mandan, Charbonneau won Sacajawea in a wager with Hidatsa warriors. Lewis and Clark recognized the importance of being accompanied by someone who spoke the language of one of the tribes living in the Rocky Mountains in the vicinity of the Three Forks.

By the time Lewis and Clark reached the Three Forks of the Missouri River, they understood the critical need for obtaining horses from the Shoshones living just to the west, and they recognized as well the need to obtain geographical information necessary for crossing into the Columbia River drainage. The role of Sacajawea loomed large indeed. First Lewis and then Clark together with Sacajawea, the expedition met and established friendly relations with the Shoshones. They shared food and presents, and they smoked a pipe with the people under the leadership of Cameahweit, later revealed to be Sacajawea's brother. Shortly thereafter, Lewis and Clark assessed the Salmon River as too wild to carry them to the Columbia so they discussed with Cameahweit how best to cross the mountains to the land of the Nez Perce. Cameahweit provided them with a guide, Old Toby, and the "expedition bartered for about thirty horses to convey their goods across the mountains. With Old Toby's assistance, the Corps of Discovery finally reached the Nez Perce villages in late September of 1805. Historian Stephen Ambrose placed a high value on the role Sacajawea's people played. "Without Shoshone horses, without Shoshone information," he explained, "the expedition might as well turn around and go home.

The tribal people living in the Lemhi and Pahsimeroi valleys and along the Salmon River in 1805 were comprised initially of two groups. They included the Agaidika, or Salmoneaters, the Tukukika, or the Sheepeaters who lived in the surrounding mountains. These people subsisted by digging camas, fishing for salmon, and hunting mountain sheep, deer, antelope, and buffalo. As such, they exhibited the classic characteristic of Plateau Indian culture. The two groups subsisting in the Salmon River Country were an organized tribe that crossed the Bitterroots to hunt buffalo north and west of Yellowstone, traveled to the Camas Prairie near Nez Perce country, and traveled north to trade with their allies, the Flatheads. Sometime after 1805, perhaps in the 1850s, the Salmoneaters and Sheepeaters were joined by a number of Bannock Indians who came north from Fort Hall where the main Bannock tribe resided. These Bannock people, numbering about one hundred, became absorbed into the Lemhi tribe living in the Salmon River country.

Mormon missionaries who came to the Salmon River Valley in 1855 were the first non-Indians to establish a sustained relationship with the Salmon River Indian people. Approximately twenty-seven Mormon men left the Salt Lake Valley on May 18, 1855. The party reached Fort Lemhi on May 27, and they selected a permanent site for their mission on June 15, 1855. The mission, named Fort Lemhi, was located approximately two miles north of present-day Tendoy, Idaho. The word "Lemhi" was associated with King Limhi who was one of the kings cited in the Book of Mormon. In Mormon scripture, King Limhi organized an expedition that lasted twenty- two days—the same duration it required the Mormon missionaries to reach the Salmon River Country. Consequently, they named their mission after King Limhi, and, in time, Limhi became Lemhi.

(7)The Mormon mission enjoyed some success, especially after the Lemhi leader, Snag, became a convert to Mormonism, and his acceptance of Mormon doctrine sparked as many as 100 baptisms among the Lemhi people.

Ultimately, however, unrest among some Bannocks, Nez Perces, and the mission led to violence. In February 1858, two hundred Shoshone and Bannock warriors attacked the mission, killing two missionaries and making off with stolen cattle and horses. The mission closed its doors on March 26, 1858.
