= Bannock people =

Indigenous people of North America

Bannock
panaki / kutsutɨkaˀa
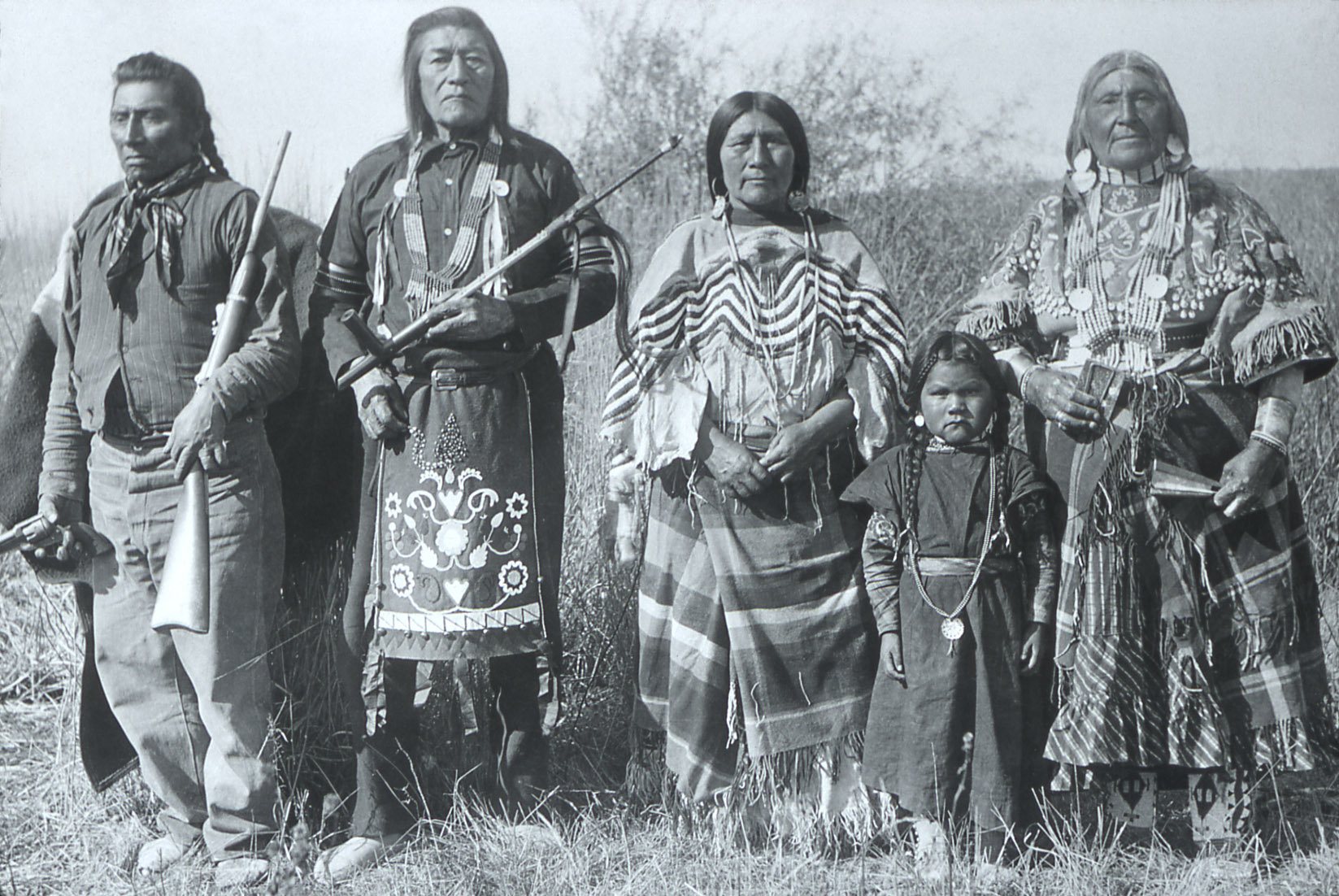
- Bannock people in Idaho

Total population
- 89 alone and in combination

Regions with significant populations
- United States (Idaho)

Languages
- Northern Paiute, English

Religion
- Native American Church, Sun Dance, traditional tribal religion, Christianity, Ghost Dance

Related ethnic groups
- Northern Paiutes, Northern Shoshone, Mono

Map of lands traditionally inhabited by the Bannock

The Bannock tribe (Northern Paiute: panaki or kutsutɨkaˀa) were originally Northern Paiute but are more culturally affiliated with the Northern Shoshone. They are in the Great Basin classification of Indigenous People. Their traditional lands include northern Nevada, southeastern Oregon, southern Idaho, and western Wyoming. Today they are enrolled in the federally recognized Shoshone-Bannock Tribes of the Fort Hall Reservation of Idaho, located on the Fort Hall Indian Reservation.

== History ==
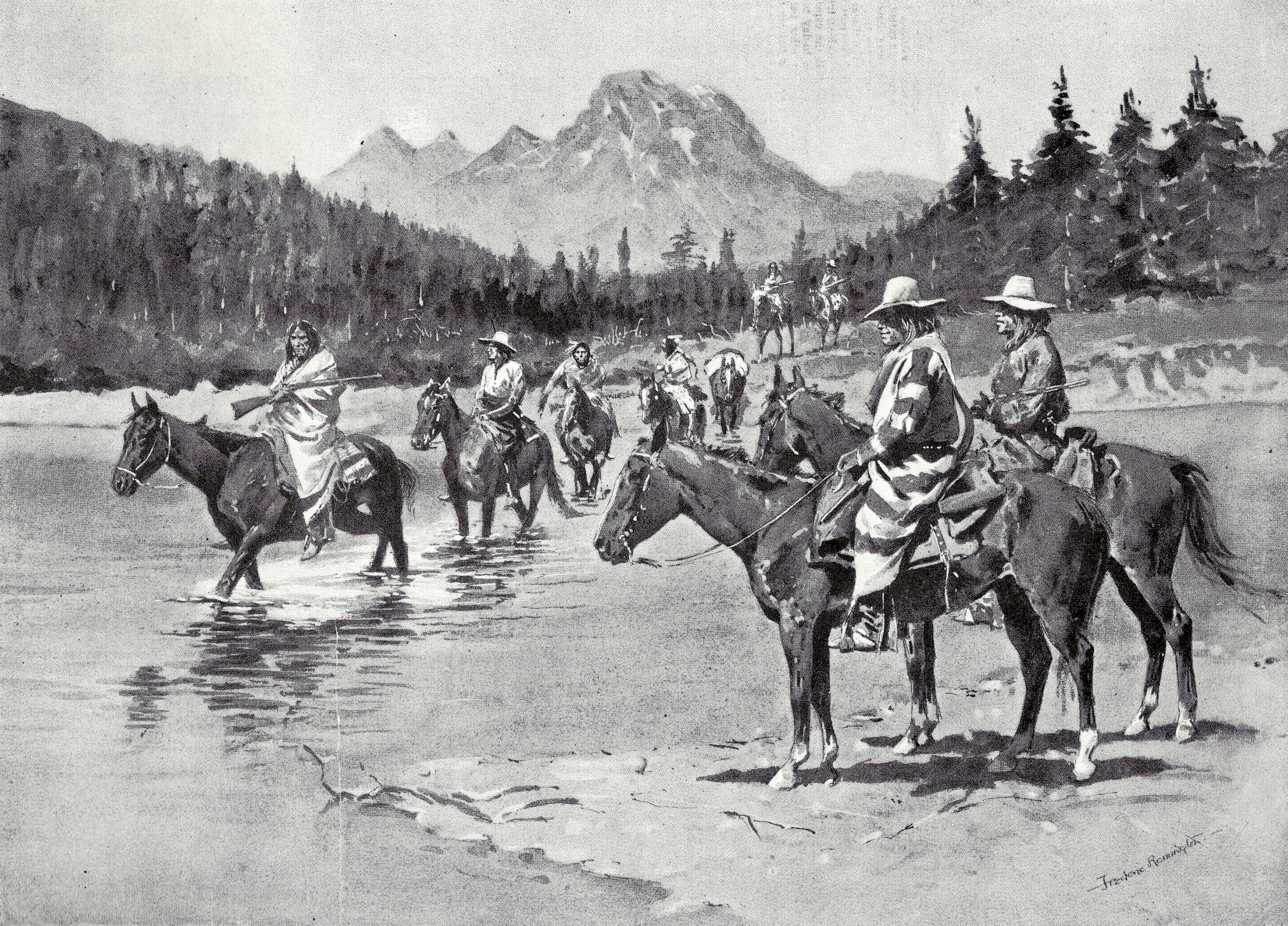
Illustration by Frederic Remington of a Bannock hunting party fording the Snake River during the Bannock War of 1895

The Northern Paiute have a history of trade with surrounding tribes. In the 1700s, the bands in eastern Oregon traded with the tribes to the north, who by 1730 had acquired the horse. In the mid-18th century, some bands developed a horse culture and split off to become the Bannock tribe. The horse gave the tribe a greater range, from Oregon to northern Nevada, southern Idaho, and western Wyoming. They forayed from there on the Bannock Trail to Montana and Canada to hunt buffalo.

The Bannock began their struggles with white settlers earlier than many other tribes. In 1814, Bannock chief The Horse began a campaign of attacks against fur traders along the Boise River which lasted until 1832. Between 1845 and the late 1850s the population of the Bannock dropped from ~1000 to less than 500. In the 1860s the Bannock began signing treaties with the white settlers alongside other Shoshone, and Gosiute groups in the region. This, included a notable treaty signed at Soda Springs in 1863 which established territorial boundaries and guarantied annuities. It was never ratified and its promises never delivered. Later the U.S. government tried to relocate the Bannock to the Wind River Indian Reservation, but the Bannock refused. In 1869 Ulysses S. Grant ordered the Bannock to report to the Fort Hall Indian Reservation and most complied.

In the 1870's the Bannock and continued to hunt and gather food outside the reservation because the provisions provided by the U.S. government were not reliable enough to support them. This led to disputes between the Bannock and surrounding settlers which eventually culminated in the Bannock War of 1878. After the war, the Bannock were permanently relocated to the Fort Hall Indian Reservation and gradually merged with the Northern Shoshone tribes. Throughout the 1880's and 90's, under increased pressure from white settlers, portions of reservation land were ceded to settlers, including the city of Pocatello in 1888. In 1900 the Shoshone-Bannock were pressured into selling 418,500 acres (1,694 km^{2}) to the U.S. government, which was rapidly claimed by settlers in a single-day land rush.

=== Present day ===
Today the Shoshone-Bannock live on the Fort Hall Indian Reservation, 544,000 acres (2,200 km^{2}) in Southeastern Idaho. Lemhi and Northern Shoshone live with the Bannock Indians. In the 2010 U.S. census, 89 people identified as having "Bannock" ancestry with 38 being "full-blooded". 5,315 people are enrolled in the Shoshone-Bannock Tribes of the Fort Hall Reservation, all of whom are designated "Shoshone-Bannock" (without more specific designation).

The Shoshone-Bannock Tribes are organized under a charter and constitution set up in 1936. They are governed by the Fort Hall Business Council, which maintains authority over the reservation, the development of lands, resources, and all matters of self-government. The Tribes operate multiple hotels and casinos, a tribal museum, and a local news station Sho-Ban News.

== Traditional culture ==
Wastawana, Bannock.

The Bannock have traditionally made pottery, utensils from bighorn sheep horns, and carrying bags made from salmon skin. Their petroglyphs date back before European contact, and, after the introduction of glass beads, they transferred their geometric design to beadwork. For water transport, they have made tule reed rafts. Prior to the late 19th century, Bannock people fished for salmon on the Snake River in Idaho and in the fall, they hunted buffalo herds. In the winter the Bannock lived primarily in tipis made from buffalo hide. During the summer they built conical dwellings of brush and grass, as well as sweat lodges and menstrual huts.

=== Practices and beliefs ===
The religious practices and beliefs of the Bannock align with many of the other tribes in the region, including worship and appeals to spirits, healing arts involving medicine men, and the belief that the soul must undertake a journey to the land of the dead after death. The Bannock wrapped their dead in blankets and placed them in rock crevices. Mourners practiced minor self mutilation, sacrificed the deceased horse, and destroyed their tipi. Their "principle ceremonies included the Scalp Dance, Grass Dance, Circle Dance, and Bear Dance." Later, after acclimation to reservation life, they also practiced the Sun Dance.

== Notable Bannock people ==
- Mary Jo Estep, elementary music teacher and survivor of the Battle of Kelley Creek
- Sally Young Kanosh, adopted daughter of Brigham Young, wife of Kanosh
- Mark Trahant, journalist
- Randy'L He-dow Teton, model
- LaNada War Jack, leader of the Third World Strikes and the Occupation of Alcatraz, activist, tribal politician, and academic
