= National Register of Historic Places listings in Lemhi County, Idaho =

Location of Lemhi County in Idaho

This is a list of the National Register of Historic Places listings in Lemhi County, Idaho.

This is intended to be a complete list of the properties and districts on the National Register of Historic Places in Lemhi County, Idaho, United States. Latitude and longitude coordinates are provided for many National Register properties and districts; these locations may be seen together in a map.

There are 15 properties and districts listed on the National Register in the county, including 1 National Historic Landmark. More may be added; properties and districts nationwide are added to the Register weekly.

This National Park Service list is complete through NPS recent listings posted December 12, 2025.

== Current listings ==
	Name on the Register	Image	Date listed	Location	City or town	Description
1	Charcoal Kilns	Charcoal Kilns	February 23, 1972 (#72001577)	Off State Highway 28; 44°18′40″N 113°10′44″W	Leadore vicinity	
2	Episcopal Church of the Redeemer	Episcopal Church of the Redeemer	January 12, 1979 (#79000801)	1st, N. and Fulton Sts. 45°10′44″N 113°54′02″W	Salmon	
3	First Flag Unfurling Site, Lewis and Clark Trail		August 22, 1975 (#75000635)	5 miles north of Tendoy in the Bitterroot Mountains; 45°01′21″N 113°34′27″W	Tendoy	
4	Fort Lemhi	Fort Lemhi	February 23, 1972 (#72000443)	Address Restricted	Tendoy	
5	Lars Geertson House	Lars Geertson House	April 3, 1980 (#80001330)	Southeast of Salmon; 45°07′44″N 113°46′42″W	Salmon vicinity	
6	Leesburg	Leesburg	April 4, 1975 (#75000634)	West of Salmon at Napias Creek in the Salmon National Forest; 45°13′32″N 114°06′44″W	Salmon vicinity	
7	Lemhi Boarding School Girls Dormitory		November 12, 1998 (#98001350)	Hayden Creek Rd., 1/8 mile southeast of its junction with U.S. Route 93; 44°51′43″N 113°37′48″W	Lemhi	
8	Lemhi County Courthouse	Lemhi County Courthouse	February 7, 1978 (#78001078)	206 Courthouse Dr. 45°10′45″N 113°54′08″W	Salmon	
9	Lemhi Pass	Lemhi Pass	October 15, 1966 (#66000313)	12 miles east of Tendoy off State Highway 28, in the Beaverhead and Salmon National Forests; 44°58′04″N 113°27′23″W	Tendoy	
10	Socrates A. Myers House	Socrates A. Myers House	December 2, 1977 (#77000468)	300 Hall St. 45°10′44″N 113°53′37″W	Salmon	
11	Odd Fellows Hall	Odd Fellows Hall	February 7, 1978 (#78001079)	516 Main St. 45°10′32″N 113°53′32″W	Salmon	
12	Salmon City Hall and Library	Salmon City Hall and Library	November 17, 1982 (#82000352)	200 Main St. 45°10′32″N 113°53′32″W	Salmon	
13	Salmon Odd Fellows Hall	Salmon Odd Fellows Hall	August 25, 1978 (#78001080)	510-514 Main St. 45°10′32″N 113°53′32″W	Salmon	
14	Shoup Building	Shoup Building	March 31, 1978 (#78001081)	Center and Main Sts. 45°10′30″N 113°53′33″W	Salmon	
15	Shoup Rock Shelters	Shoup Rock Shelters	November 8, 1974 (#74000744)	Address Restricted	Cobalt	

== See also ==
- List of National Historic Landmarks in Idaho
- National Register of Historic Places listings in Idaho
