= Lemhi =

Lemhi could refer to:

== People ==
- Lemhi Shoshone, a band of Shoshone in Idaho / Pacific Northwest region
- Limhi, a king mentioned in the Book of Mormon of Mormonism

== Places ==
- Fort Lemhi, a fort built by Mormon missionaries in 1855 near modern Tendoy, Idaho
- Lemhi, Idaho, an unincorporated community
- Lemhi County, Idaho
- Lemhi County Airport, a public airport located south of Salmon, Idaho
- Lemhi National Forest, in Idaho
- Lemhi Pass, pass in the Rocky Mountains between Idaho and Montana
- Lemhi River, a tributary of the Salmon River in Idaho
- National Register of Historic Places listings in Lemhi County, Idaho

== Other ==
- Lemhi Gold, a thoroughbred racehorse
