= Shoup =

Shoup may refer to:

- Shoup (surname), a list of people
- Shoup, Idaho, United States, an unincorporated community
- Shoup Rock Shelters, two prehistoric rock shelters in Lemhi County, Idaho
- USS Shoup, a United States Navy guided-missile destroyer in commission since 2002
- USNS Sgt. Curtis F. Shoup (T-AG-175), a coastal freighter
- Shoup's Mountain Battery, a Confederate Civil War unit
- Shoup Voting Machine Corporation
- Shoup Building, Salmon, Idaho, United States, on the National Register of Historic Places

== See also ==
- Shoop (disambiguation)
