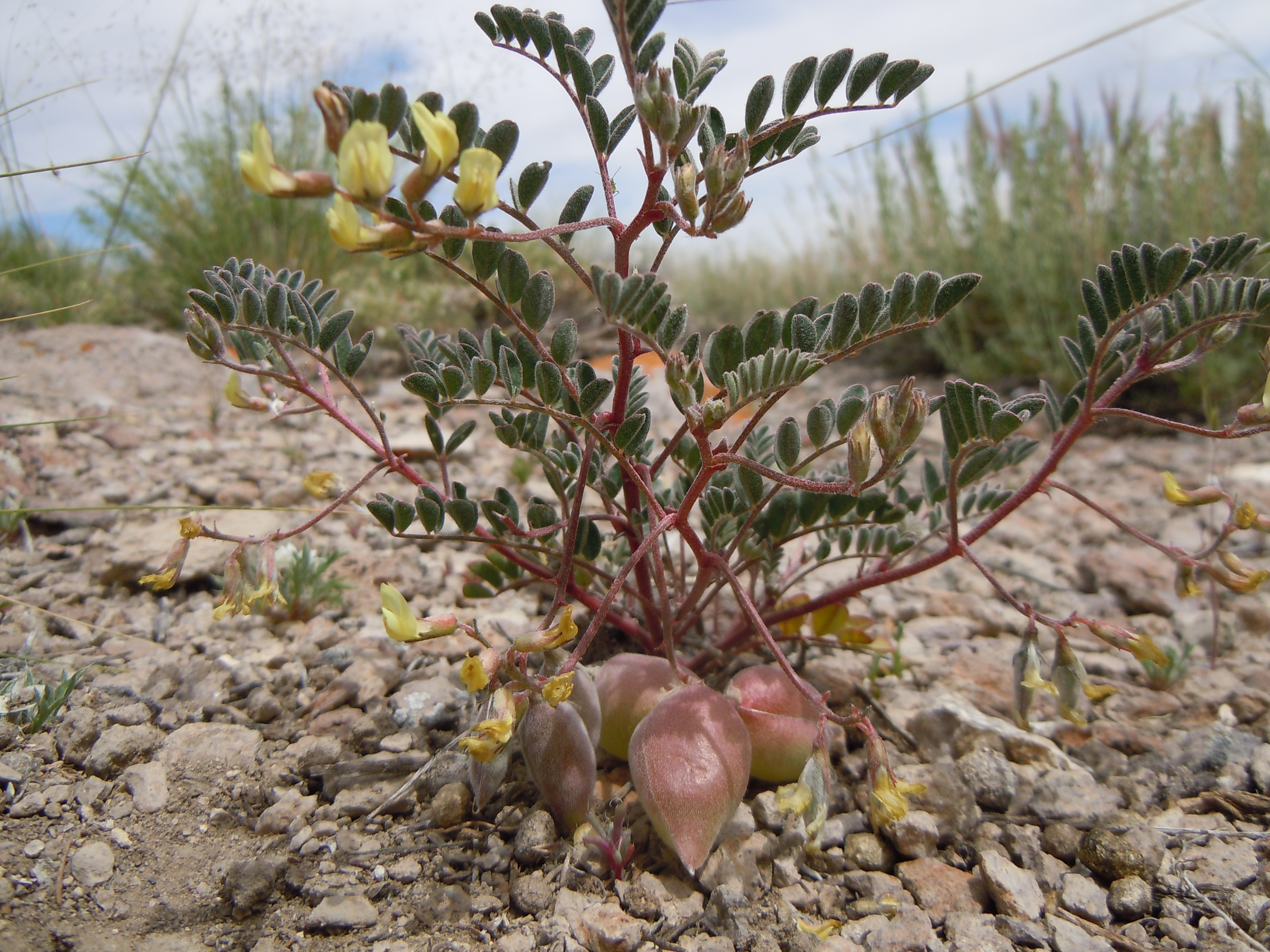

Conservation status
- Vulnerable (NatureServe)

Scientific classification
- Kingdom: Plantae
- Clade: Embryophytes
- Clade: Tracheophytes
- Clade: Spermatophytes
- Clade: Angiosperms
- Clade: Eudicots
- Clade: Rosids
- Order: Fabales
- Family: Fabaceae
- Subfamily: Faboideae
- Genus: Astragalus
- Species: A. aquilonius

Binomial name
- Astragalus aquilonius (Barneby) Barneby

= Astragalus aquilonius =

Species of legume

Astragalus aquilonius, the Lemhi milkvetch, is a milkvetch species belonging to the Fabaceae family. It is native to Idaho.

== Description ==
The flowers may be white, green, purple, or violet. The blooming period occurs in May, June, and July. The leaves are arranged alternately. The fruit is a legume. The long stipules are purplish. The lanceolate leaves are typically purplish. The pedicels are slender. The fruit is usually straight and divaricate, with loosely spreading pods.

== Conservation status ==
It has a global conservation rank of G3, indicating it is vulnerable. This rank is the same within Idaho. The plant is found near the upper Salmon River and the lower Lemhi River, and occurs in Lemhi, Custer, and Butte counties. It is known to grow in 39 locations.
