= Cameahwait =

Shoshone chief

Cameahwait was a Shoshone chief and the brother of Sacagawea. He was the leader of the first group of inhabitants of modern-day Idaho who were encountered by Europeans when he met Meriwether Lewis and three other members of the Lewis and Clark Expedition on August 13, 1805. He then accompanied Lewis across Lemhi Pass to meet William Clark and the remainder of the expedition. Sacagawea was with Clark's party and recognized Cameahwait as her brother.

To the Shoshone, Cameahwait and Sacagawea were brother and sister. However, in the Shoshoni language, "cousin" and "brother" are the same word, indicating the tribe thinks of them as the same. Consequently, when Sacagawea cried out that she recognized Cameahwait as her brother, that is what she meant, but whether they actually had the same father, let alone the same mother, is unclear.

== Background ==
Several years before the encounter with the Lewis and Clark expedition, when Sacagawea was twelve years old, she and her friend Otter Woman had been kidnapped by the Hidatsa tribe and used as slaves. They were then sold to Toussaint Charbonneau, a French-Canadian trapper living among the Hidatsas and Mandans, who took the teenaged Sacagawea as his wife. In February 1805, she gave birth to their son, Jean Baptiste Charbonneau (nicknamed "Pompey"), at Fort Mandan in present-day North Dakota. There the family met the Lewis and Clark expedition. Expecting to need to trade with Shoshones for horses in order to cross the continental divide and knowing Sacagawea's value as an interpreter, Lewis invited Charbonneau, Sacagawea, and Pompey to accompany the expedition as it continued west.

By August 1805, the expedition had reached the headwaters of the Missouri River but had not yet encountered the Shoshones or any other Indians in the area, and thus did not know where to find the most convenient pass through the Rocky Mountains into the Columbia River watershed. Lewis, George Drouillard, John Shields, and Hugh McNeal left Clark and the rest of the expedition on the Jefferson River and set off overland toward the divide in search of the Shoshones. They discovered Cameahwait's small band camped on a tributary of the Salmon River shortly after crossing the divide at Lemhi Pass, just north of what is now Tendoy, Idaho.

Lewis eventually returned with Cameahwait and more than a dozen other Shoshones to the Missouri River drainage, where they met Clark, Sacagawea, and the rest of the expedition. Cameahwait's band ultimately traded several dozen horses to the expedition and helped them portage most of their supplies over Lemhi Pass.

== Death ==
Cameahwait was killed during a battle with the Blackfeet at Bloody Creek in Montana in April 1812. It is believed he was buried on a butte between the towns of Lemhi and Tendoy.

== Legacy ==
There is a lake in the Wind River Indian Reservation near Shoshoni, Wyoming, named Lake Cameahwait.
