= Odd Fellows Hall (Salmon, Idaho) =

- U.S. National Register of Historic Places
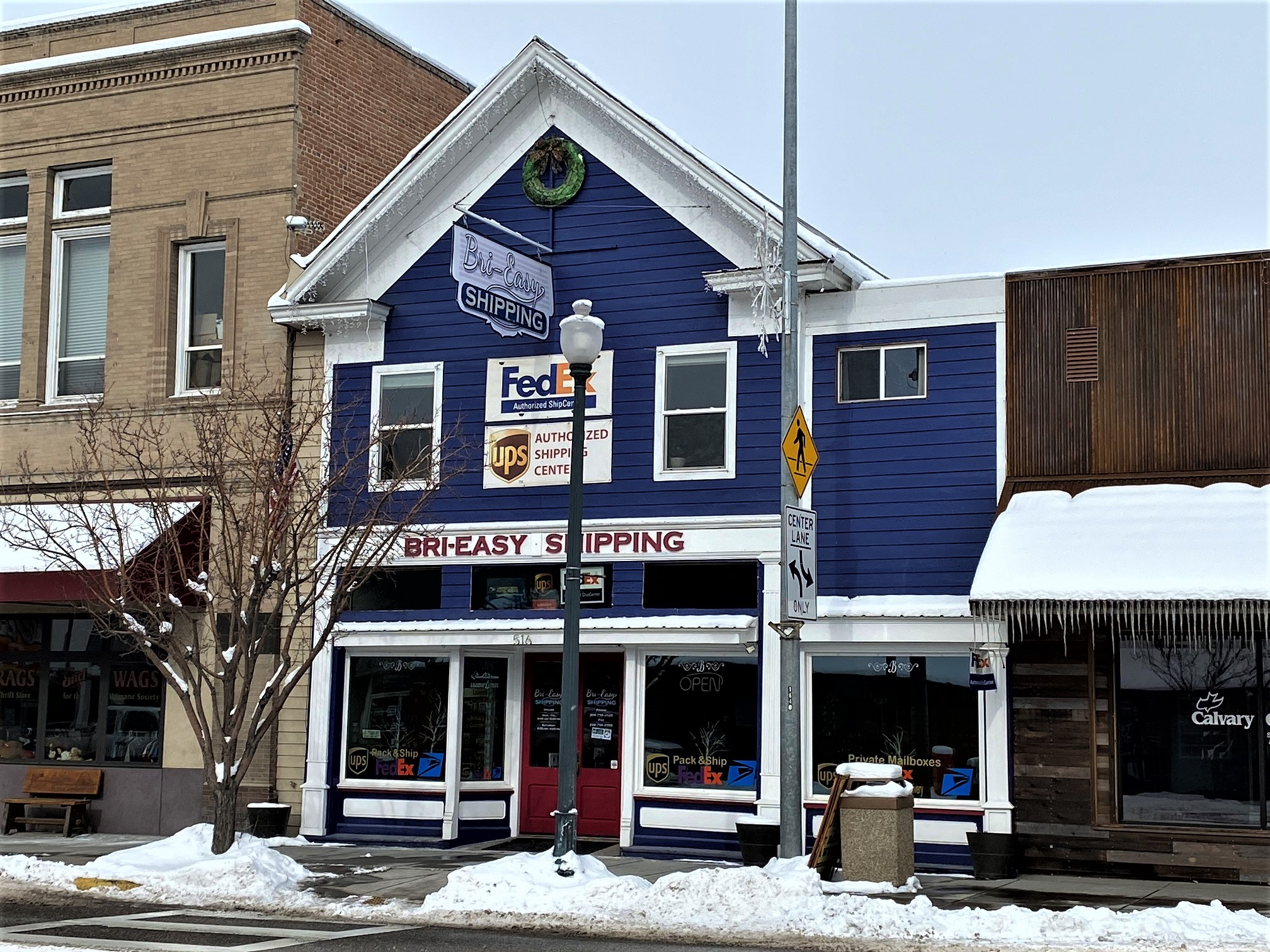

- Location within Idaho Location within the United States
- Location: 516 Main St., Salmon, Idaho
- Coordinates: 45°10′32″N 113°53′32″W
- Area: less than one acre
- Built: 1874
- Architectural style: Greek Revival
- NRHP reference No.: 78001079
- Added to NRHP: February 7, 1978

The Odd Fellows Hall is a historic building located at 516 Main St. in Salmon, Idaho. The building was constructed in 1874 as a meeting place for Salmon's chapter of the International Order of Odd Fellows. The wood frame building was designed in the Greek Revival style and features Ionic pilasters on its front face. A wooden front designed to resemble cast iron was added to the building in 1888. The Odd Fellows built a new meeting hall, the Salmon Odd Fellows Hall, in 1907. The original building is one of the few remaining fraternal halls from the 1800s in Idaho.

The building was listed on the National Register of Historic Places (NRHP) in 1978. The 1907 Odd Fellows building which replaced it is also on the NRHP.

== See also ==
- List of Odd Fellows buildings
- National Register of Historic Places listings in Lemhi County, Idaho
