= Fort Lemhi =

- U.S. National Register of Historic Places
- Fort Lemhi Circa 1900

- Location within Idaho Location within the United States
- Nearest city: Salmon, Idaho
- Coordinates: 44.9838°N 113.6408°W
- Area: 9 acres (3.6 ha)
- Built: 1855
- NRHP reference No.: 72000443
- Added to NRHP: February 23, 1972

Fort Lemhi (originally spelled Fort Limhi) was a Mormon settlement from 1855 to 1858 located approximately two miles (3 km) north of present-day Tendoy, Idaho, that served as the base of operations for the Salmon River Mission. The mission was initially created as part of a larger effort to proselytize Native Americans throughout western North America; however, the fort eventually became a critical piece of Brigham Young's strategy in the Utah War. The surprise attack on Fort Lemhi in 1858 was the catalyst for bringing the Utah War to a resolution.

== Formation ==
A map of Lemhi Valley hand-drawn by Benjamin F. Cummings

Brigham Young called twenty-seven men from the Salt Lake Valley to form the Salmon River Mission and preach to the "remnants of the House of Jacob," meaning the Native Americans Thomas S. Smith led the group and George Washington Hill served as their main Shoshonean language interpreter. The party travelled about 380 miles north of Salt Lake City to the Salmon River valley (then in Oregon Territory). They selected a permanent site to build a settlement on June 15, 1855 on land used by Bannock, Shoshone, Nez Perce and Flathead peoples. Access to each of these nations made the location ideal for a missionary outpost. The Nez Perce and Bannock leaders agreed to let the missionaries use the land for fishing, hunting, and log cutting, as long as it was not done to make a profit.

The community grew to over 200 people. The settlers brought stock raising and irrigated farming to the region, and dug ditches which are still in use. At the direct behest of Brigham Young and Heber C. Kimball, at least three of the Mormon missionaries at Fort Lemhi married Shoshone women: Ezra J. Barnard, Thomas Day, and Richard B. Margetts.

Lemhi Pass

According to tradition, Sacajawea was born in an area near where the fort would eventually stand. She led Lewis and Clark's company through the Continental Divide through what is now known as Lemhi Pass.

=== Name ===
The mission was named Fort Limhi for King Limhi, a king in the Book of Mormon. In Mormon scripture, King Limhi organized an expedition that lasted 22 days, the same duration it required the Mormon missionaries to reach the Salmon River. Consequently, they named their mission after King Limhi, and Limhi eventually became "Lemhi." Over time the surrounding valley, mountains, pass, a branch of the river, county, and Native Americans took on the name "Lemhi."

== Significance during the Utah War ==
Gaining Native American allies was a key part of Brigham Young's strategy to maintain independence from the United States. Brigham Young and other church leaders taught that by accepting baptism and intermarriage with Mormons, Native Americans would fulfill a Book of Mormon prophecy that Lamanites would return to the house of Israel. While it is no longer a core tenet of the Latter-day Saint faith, at the time leaders taught that "the time had arrived when all the wicked should be destroyed from the face of the earth, and that the Indians would be the principal means by which this object should be accomplished." Fort Lemhi was particularly significant to Brigham Young's war strategy because it would be a way station in case of a northern evacuation from Utah.

=== Bitterroot Valley exploration ===
As tensions between the US government and the Utah territory increased, Young developed a contingency plan to evacuate his followers north via Fort Lemhi as far north as Canada if necessary. In October 1856, Fort Lemhi missionary Pleasant Green Taylor was instructed to contact an agent of the Hudson's Bay Company about purchasing Fort Hall. Taylor and three other missionaries travelled to the Bitterroot Valley to meet with Hudson's Bay agent Neil McArthur. McArthur agreed to pass Young's interest along to Hudson's Bay, and the four Fort Lemhi missionaries returned to Brigham Young with a map and favorable reports of the valley. They were impressed with the area's agricultural, defensive, and transportation potential as a new home for Young's followers. Furthermore, Brigham Young felt there might be more security living on the upper Missouri among the Native peoples of the Northwest, as they would be stronger military allies than the tribes of the Great Basin. After receiving the report on the Bitterroot Valley, Young decided to visit the area himself and attempt alliances with the Lakota, Blackfoot, Bannock, Nez Perce, Shoshone, and Flathead nations.

=== Visit from Brigham Young ===
Brigham Young visited Fort Lemhi in spring of 1857 to turn the mission into a more permanent settlement. He traveled in a mile-long caravan of 115 men, 22 women, 5 boys, 168 horses and mules, 54 carriages and wagons, and two light boats for river crossings. Notable members of the party included Heber C. Kimball, Daniel H. Wells, Chief Arapeen and his wife Wispit, and interpreter Dimick B. Huntington.

Young was pleased with the growth of the mission and friendly relations he felt the colonizers had with the local Native American tribes. He told the missionaries to move their families to Fort Lemhi. Young also made plans for a second fort on the Salmon River's east fork. In a sermon, Heber C. Kimball reminded the missionaries of their duty to intermarry with the Native Americans and become one people. Nine men responded by leaving the fort to propose to native women and were refused. General Daniel H. Wells drilled the Fort Lemhi militia.

Upon his return to Salt Lake, Young told his followers the purpose of the trip north had been to "rest the mind and weary the body" and downplayed the quality of land he had visited. However, to his inner circle he praised the abundance of good soil and grazing land and made plans to settle the Bitterroot valley and beyond. After a prayer circle meeting with Young where they discussed Fort Lemhi, Wilford Woodruff wrote, "This [Fort Limhi] is the key of this continent and I think we had better keep near the lock and keep the key in our own hand."

According to Moulton, "While Young claimed it was a 'pleasure ride,' most recognized it as something altogether different. Young nurtured friendly relations with local Indian tribes, and this trip north was a reconnaissance to find an escape route from the oncoming federal troops."

==== Consequences of the visit from Brigham Young ====
While the local Native American tribes had agreed to a small mission outpost, they were against a permanent settlement. The colony required more buildings, fences, and land, which soured relationships with local native tribes. Furthermore, Flathead leaders throughout the Northwest worried the Mormons "should overrun and occupy their lands in force."

Salmon River

Brigham Young's visit to Fort Lemhi also came under federal scrutiny. The journey took Young outside of his jurisdiction as superintendent of Indian Affairs for the Utah Territory. His visits with Native Americans of the Oregon Territory and the gifts he gave them violated federal law; Young later documented these items as gifts for Utah Indians. The visit also spawned rumors from Native American leaders and U.S. Indian agents that Mormons were supplying the Nez Perce, Walla Walla, Snakes, and Flatheads with weapons, inciting hostilities, and encouraging them to fight against the U.S. Government. Commissioner of Indian Affairs J. W. Denver reprimanded Young, writing, "you fitted out an expedition yourself, and conducted it northward, out of your superintendency, to give presents to Indians not under your control." This letter, along with 46 other files from the Office of Indian Affairs, was included in President Buchanan's report to Congress justifying his order to send troops into Utah.

=== Attack on Fort Lemhi ===
Native tribes became less friendly with the settlers as they awaited the outcome of the impending Utah War and more colonists arrived to the fort and competed for resources. The settlers also interfered in a Bannock, Shoshone, and Nez Perce tribal dispute over horses, though they were largely ignorant of their complex relationships. In December 1857, the Mormons at Fort Lemhi held mountaineer John W. Powell in custody when asked to by the Nez Perce, which angered the Bannocks, with whom Powell had connections.

In need of supplies to survive a winter encampment, US Army Col. Albert Sidney Johnston sent a party northward from Camp Scott to buy 500 cattle from the mountaineers around the upper Columbia and Missouri rivers. Led by Benjamin Franklin Ficklin, the party was made up of entirely civilian volunteers, and not directly under army supervision. On January 4, 1858, around fifty miles east of Fort Lemhi, the party realized the mountaineers had abandoned the area, taking their animals with them. The mountaineers had abandoned their normal winter quarters due to rumors originating from Fort Lemhi that the Mormons were to soon emigrate north and overrun the land. Unable to convince any remaining non-Mormons to trade, Ficklin turned his attention toward the 250 cattle and 40 horses at Fort Lemhi. He was possibly aided by Powell, who had some influence among the Bannocks.

On February 25, 1858, Bannock Chief Le Grand Coquin led 250 Bannock and Shoshone warriors in a surprise attack on Fort Lemhi, possibly with John Powell. They killed two Mormon settlers, wounded five, and forced the remaining 69 colonists to retreat to the log fort. They also captured over 200 cattle and 30 horses. In March, after a rescue effort made by Lehi militia members, the colonizers abandoned the fort and returned to Utah. Ficklin returned with Powell to Camp Scott in April, with only about thirty horses, as Le Grand Coquin kept the rest of the animals for himself.

==== Rescue ====
The people at Fort Lemhi endured siege conditions for roughly three weeks while waiting for a rescue. On February 28, 1858, Ezra J. Barnard and Baldwin J. Watts snuck away from the fort and travelled the four hundred miles to arrive in Salt Lake on March 8. The last two days of their journey they had no food and only one horse. Details of the attack were stitched into the lining of Barnard's coat.

Brigham Young ordered his followers to abandon the mission. He also ordered Colonel Andrew Cunningham to lead three companies of men from Davis, Weber, and Utah Counties to aid the evacuation. The military escort of 150 militia men led the remaining members of the Salmon River Indian Mission home. An advance party of ten men were ambushed and missionary Bailey Lake was killed.

==== Consequences of attack on Fort Lemhi ====
This attack took Brigham Young by surprise and frustrated his plans to evacuate his followers north. Young had hoped the northern tribes would welcome their alliance and join the Mormons in the fight against the United States. In contrast, the attack demonstrated the Bannocks' hostility and a willingness to work with the US army. The attack also forced the closure of Fort Lemhi, a key supply station in the event of a northern evacuation.

With nowhere to go, Young began peacemaking efforts with the U.S. government. Throughout the first week of March, Thomas L. Kane had attempted to convince Brigham Young to send provisions to the US army to show their peaceful intentions, but was unsuccessful in persuading them to pursue peace. Kane then prepared to visit the US army at Camp Scott to attempt brokering peace. News of the Fort Lemhi attack reached Brigham Young on March 8, the day Kane planned to leave. Kane noted a dramatic change in Brigham Young's demeanor, though Young did not mention the attack to the ambassador. While enroute to the army, Kane was overtaken by messengers with a letter from Young, stating he had just found out the army needed provisions and he would be happy to supply them as a show of good will.

On April 14, 1858, the Deseret News reported that Johnston's soldiers had instigated the attack on Fort Lemhi and "offered the Indians $150 for every Mormon they delivered to them." Although Ficklin was a private citizen, Johnston had authorized the mission without army supervision. Because Ficklin failed to include the attack in his initial report but later claimed in an affidavit that the Mormons had brought it on themselves, it appeared to coverup a US army attack on civilians. Johnston's official investigation attempted to separate the US army from the Fort Lemhi attack and maintain favorable public opinion.

== Reoccupation ==
Fort Lemhi was reoccupied in 1862 by miners, who grew vegetables there for sale.

The name Lemhi became applied to the Lemhi River and valley surrounding the mission site, as well as to the Lemhi Shoshone whom the mission served, the Lemhi Pass and eventually Lemhi County.

The site is on the National Register of Historic Places.

== See also ==
- Fort Supply
- Lemhi, Idaho
- Old Las Vegas Mormon Fort
