= Richard Shoup =

Richard Shoup may refer to:

- Richard G. Shoup (1923–1995), U.S. Representative from Montana
- Richard Shoup (programmer) (1943–2015), computer programmer who developed SuperPaint

== See also ==
- Shoup (disambiguation)
