= Socrates A. Myers House =

Historic house in Idaho, United States

- U.S. National Register of Historic Places
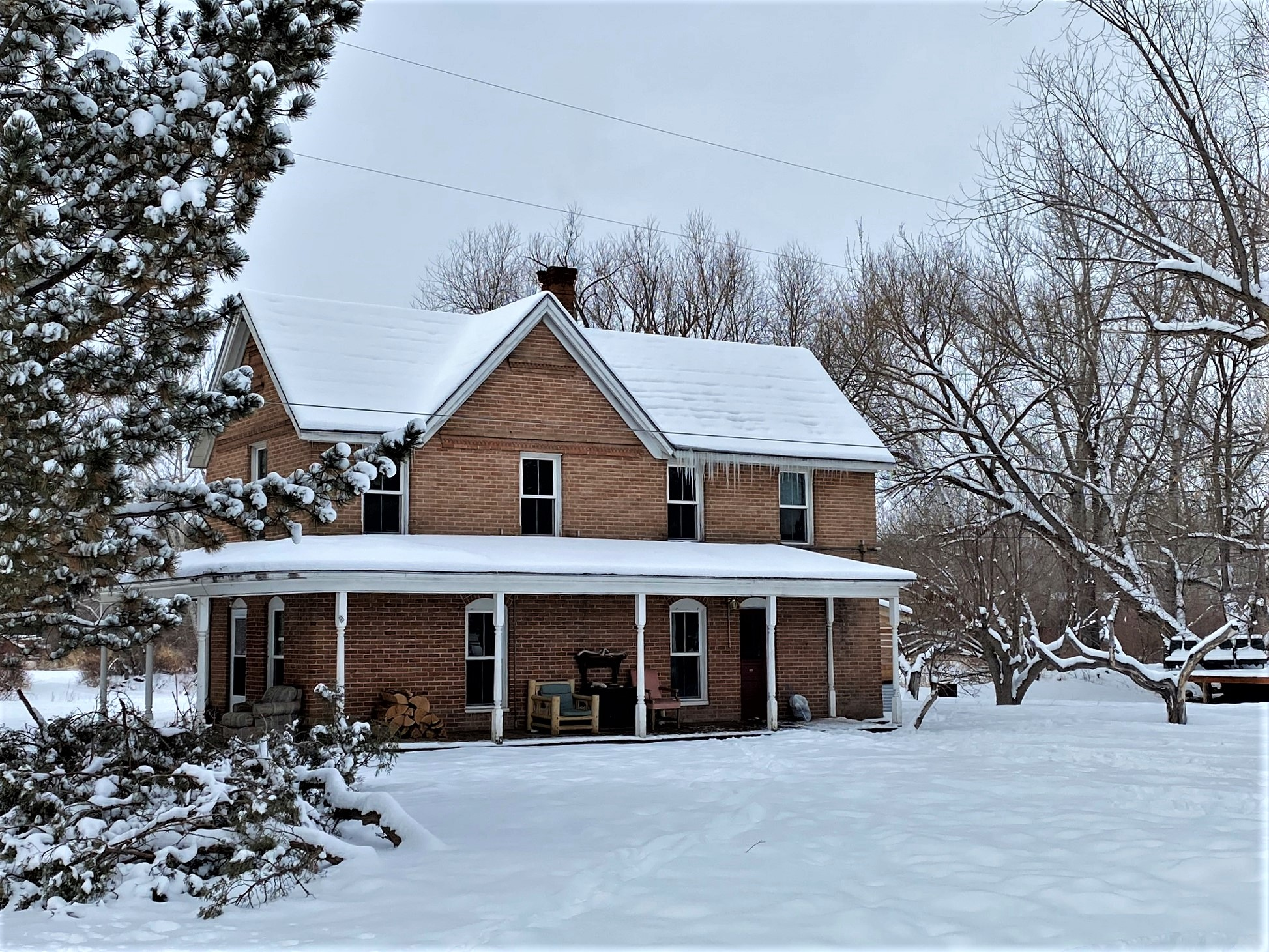

- Location within Idaho Location within the United States
- Location: 300 Hall St. Salmon, Idaho
- Coordinates: 45°10′44″N 113°53′37″W
- Area: less than one acre
- Built: 1900
- NRHP reference No.: 77000468
- Added to NRHP: December 2, 1977

The Socrates A. Myers House is a historic house located at 300 Hall Street in Salmon, Idaho. The two-story house was built in 1900; at the time, it was part of a farm overlooking the Salmon River. The house has a brick veneer exterior; while it is one of many brick houses built around 1900 in Salmon, it stands out due to its architectural features. A verandah wraps around two sides of the house, and the steep roof has several gables. The house also uses brick in its decorative elements, such as the segmental arches on its first-floor windows and the bands of brick across the gables. A wooden addition was added to the back in 1937 so the house could serve as a dairy.

The house was added to the National Register of Historic Places on December 2, 1977.
