= Salmon Odd Fellows Hall =

- U.S. National Register of Historic Places
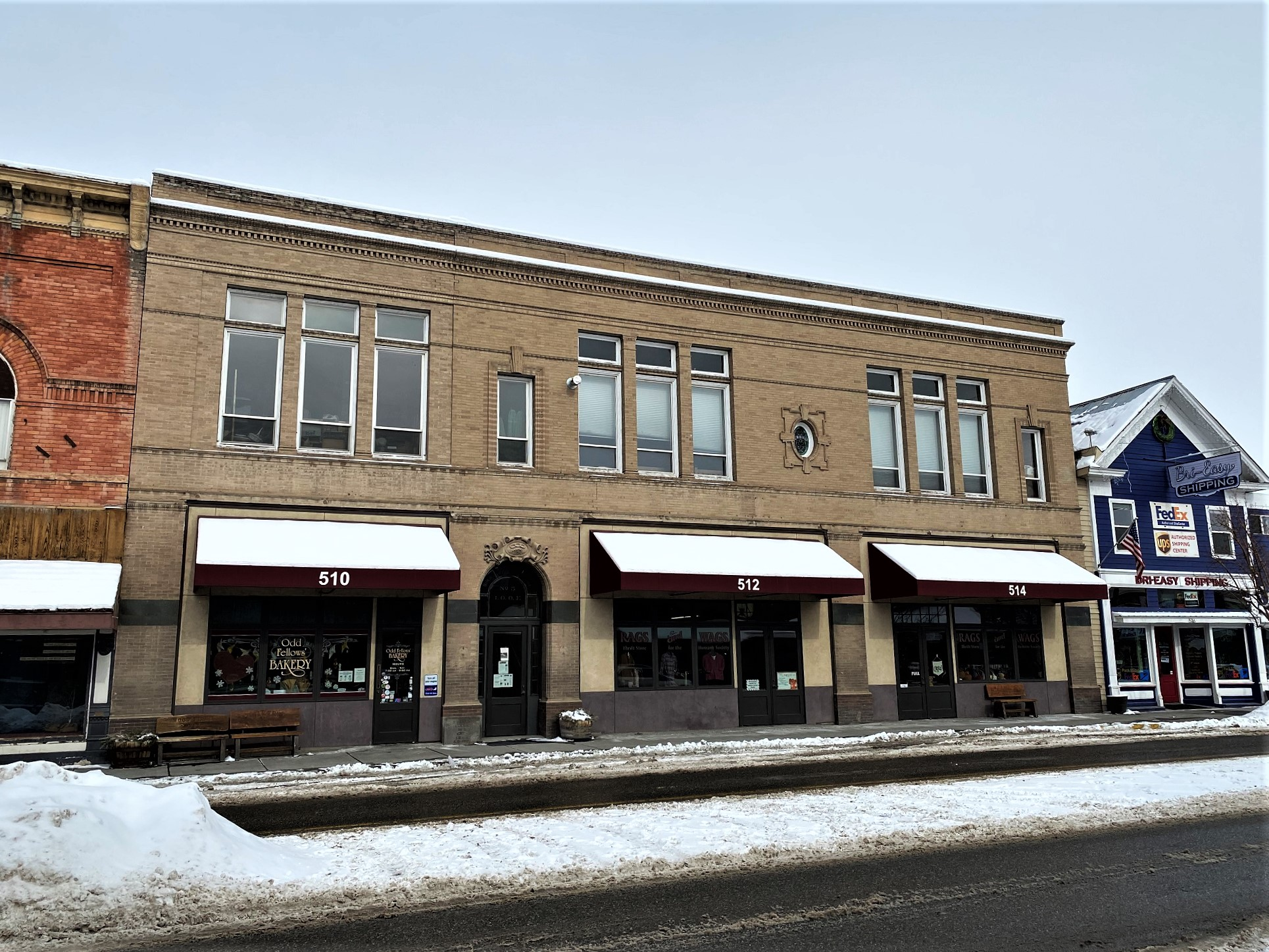

- Location within Idaho Location within the United States
- Location: 510--514 Main St., Salmon, Idaho
- Coordinates: 45°10′32″N 113°53′32″W
- Area: less than one acre
- Built: 1907
- Architect: Merritt, Allan
- Architectural style: Classical Revival
- NRHP reference No.: 78001080
- Added to NRHP: August 25, 1978

The Salmon Odd Fellows Hall is a historic building located at 510-514 Main St. in Salmon, Idaho. The Salmon chapter of the International Order of Odd Fellows built the hall in 1907 to replace their previous building, the 1874 Odd Fellows Hall. The Classical Revival building was designed by local architect Allan Merritt. The building features three bays separated by pilasters on its first floor and terra cotta moldings above and below the second floor windows. The second floor also includes an oval stained glass window and two small windows topped by keystones.

The building was listed on the National Register of Historic Places in 1978. Its predecessor, the 1874 Odd Fellows Hall, is also listed on the NRHP.

== See also ==
- List of Odd Fellows buildings
- National Register of Historic Places listings in Lemhi County, Idaho
