= Episcopal Church of the Redeemer (Salmon, Idaho) =

Historic church in Idaho, United States

- U.S. National Register of Historic Places
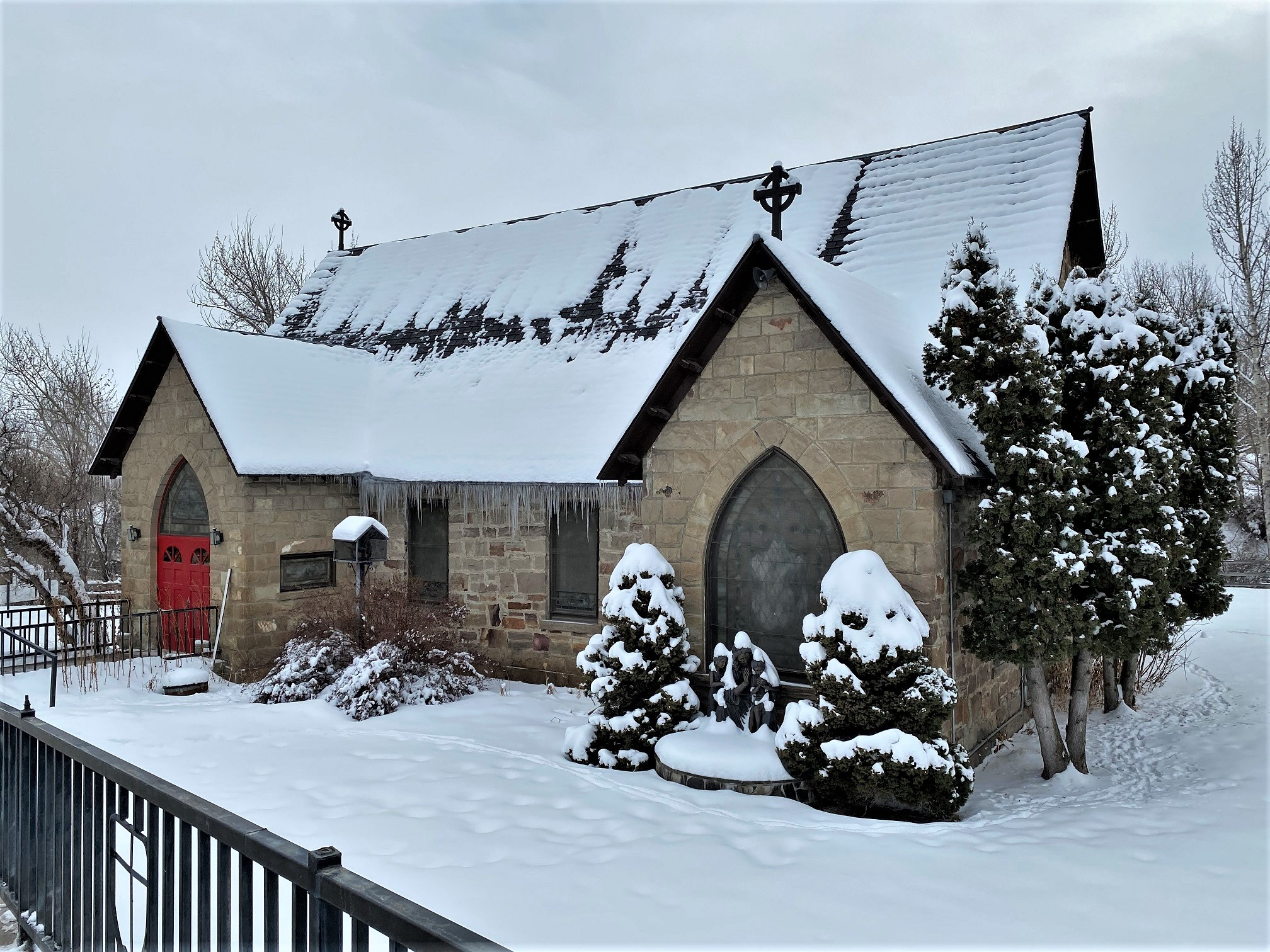

- Location within Idaho Location within the United States
- Location: 1st, North, and Fulton Sts., Salmon, Idaho
- Coordinates: 45°10′44″N 113°54′2″W
- Area: less than one acre
- Built: 1902
- Architect: Pollard, Frank
- Architectural style: Gothic Revival
- NRHP reference No.: 79000801
- Added to NRHP: January 12, 1979

The Episcopal Church of the Redeemer is an historic Episcopal Church located on 1st Street North at Fulton Street in Salmon, Idaho. It is a parish of the Episcopal Diocese of Idaho.

In 2016, the church reported 111 members; in 2023, it reported 90 members. No membership statistics were reported in 2024 national parochial reports. Plate and pledge financial support reported by the church in 2024 was $33,537. Average Sunday Attendance (ASA) reported in 2024 was 21 persons. This was a relative decrease on ASA of 26 reported in 2022.

== Building and history ==
Built in 1902, it was designed by stone mason Frank Pollard. The one-story church has a Gothic Revival design which uses rusticated stone. Prominent Gothic features of the church include its symmetrical plan, Gothic arched entrances, decorative Celtic crosses, and stained glass windows.

On January 12, 1979, the church was added to the National Register of Historic Places.
