= Shoop Shoop =

Shoop Shoop may refer to:

- "Exhale (Shoop Shoop)," a Whitney Houston song
- "The Shoop Shoop Song (It's in His Kiss)," a song written by Rudy Clark
- "Shoop Shoop Diddy Wop Cumma Cumma Wang Dang", a single by Monte Video and the Cassettes

== See also ==
- Shoop (disambiguation)
