= Lars Geertson House =

Historic house in Idaho, United States

- U.S. National Register of Historic Places
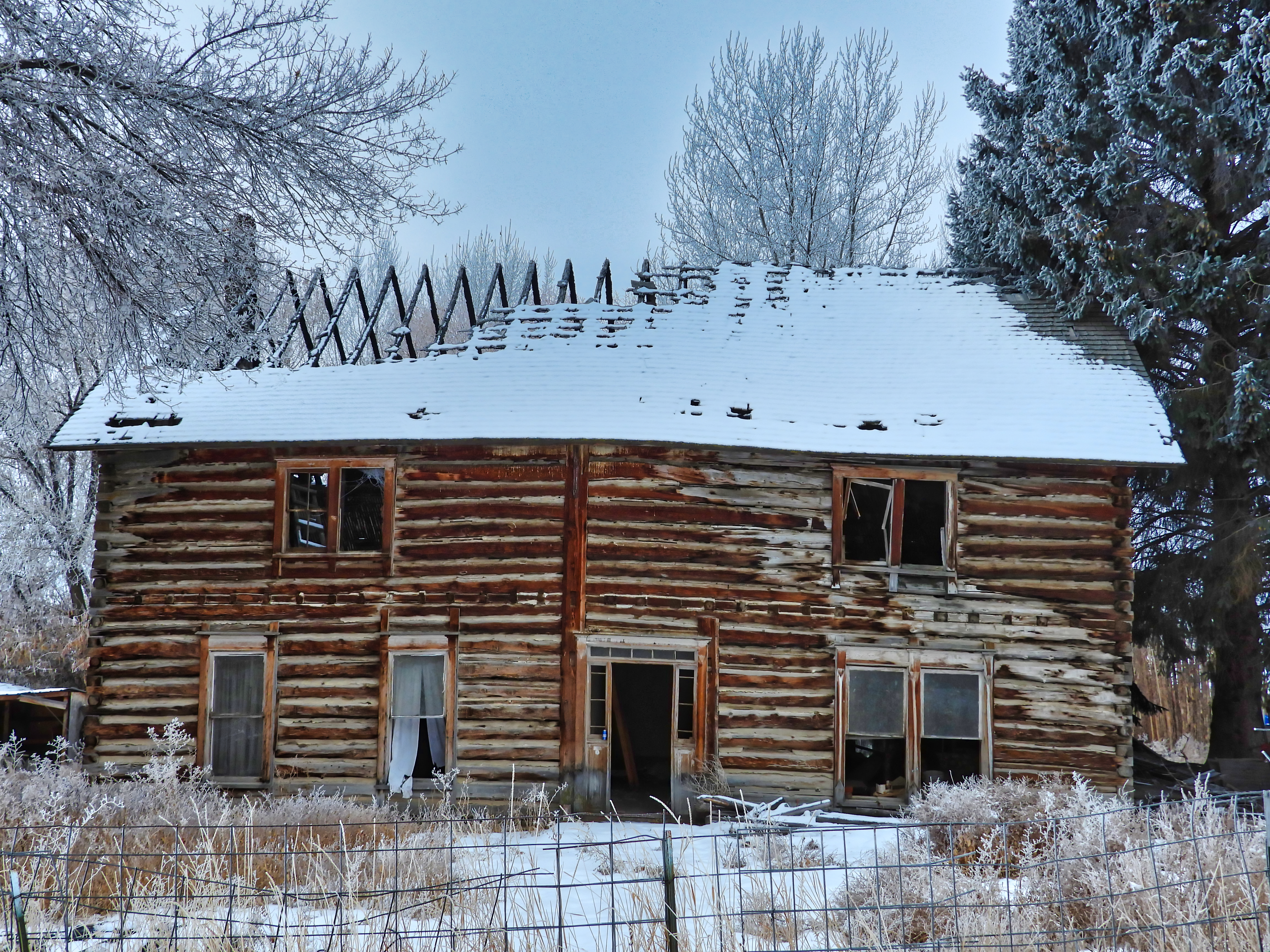

- Location within Idaho Location within the United States
- Nearest city: Salmon, Idaho
- Coordinates: 45°7′44″N 113°46′42″W
- Area: less than one acre
- Built: 1883
- Built by: Geertson, Lars
- NRHP reference No.: 80001330
- Added to NRHP: April 3, 1980

The Lars Geertson House is a historic house located southeast of Salmon in Lemhi County, Idaho. Lars Geertson, a Danish immigrant and cattle rancher, built the house from 1872 to 1883. The two-story log house was built from hewn timbers; the ends were joined by square notches, and the walls were filled in with chinking. In addition to being a rare two-story log house, it is a well-preserved example of typical American log construction methods. Geertson also used his house as the commissary for his ranch, a stagecoach station, and a dance hall.

The house was added to the National Register of Historic Places on April 3, 1980.
