= Salmon City Hall and Library =

- U.S. National Register of Historic Places
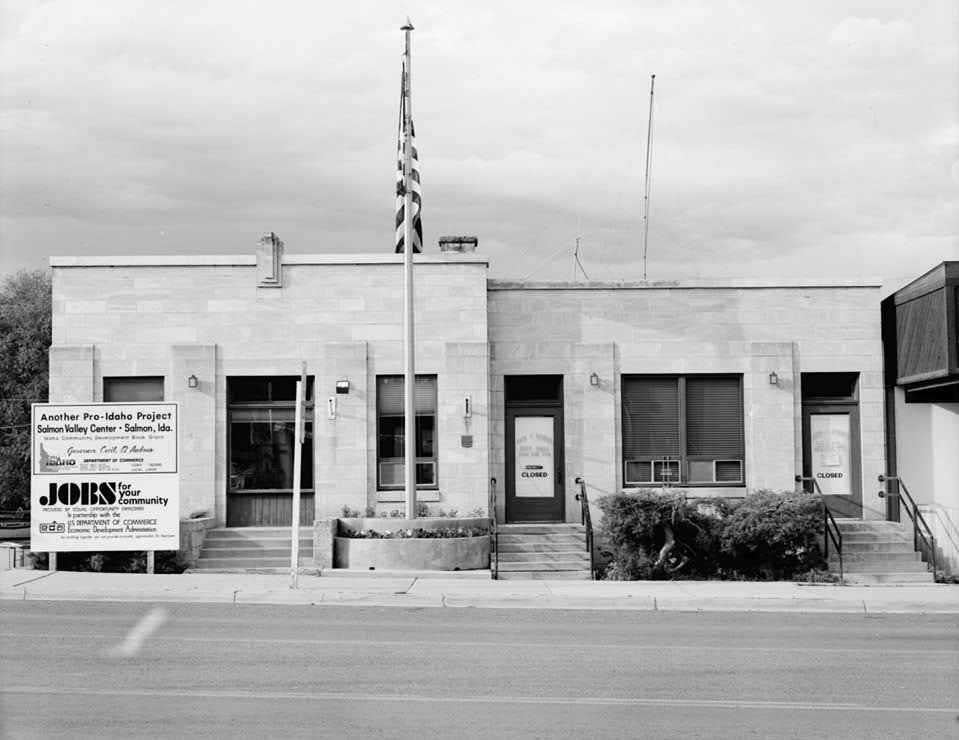
- HABS photo of the building

- Location within Idaho Location within the United States
- Location: 200 Main St., Salmon, Idaho
- Coordinates: 45°10′32″N 113°53′32″W
- Area: less than one acre
- Built: 1939
- Architect: Hummel, Frank
- Architectural style: Art Deco
- MPS: Tourtellotte and Hummel Architecture TR
- NRHP reference No.: 82000352
- Added to NRHP: November 17, 1982

The Salmon City Hall and Library is a historic building located at 200 Main Street in Salmon, Idaho. The building was built by the Works Progress Administration in 1939 to serve as the city's city hall and public library. Architect Frank Hummel of the prominent Idaho architectural firm Tourtellotte & Hummel designed the building in the Art Deco style. The sandstone building's design features flat pilasters dividing the doors and windows and a geometric cornice with a tiered keystone on the library's half of the building. The design is the best example of the Art Deco style in Salmon and one of the firm's best-regarded works for a government project.

The building was added to the National Register of Historic Places on November 17, 1982.
