= Lemhi County Courthouse =

- U.S. National Register of Historic Places
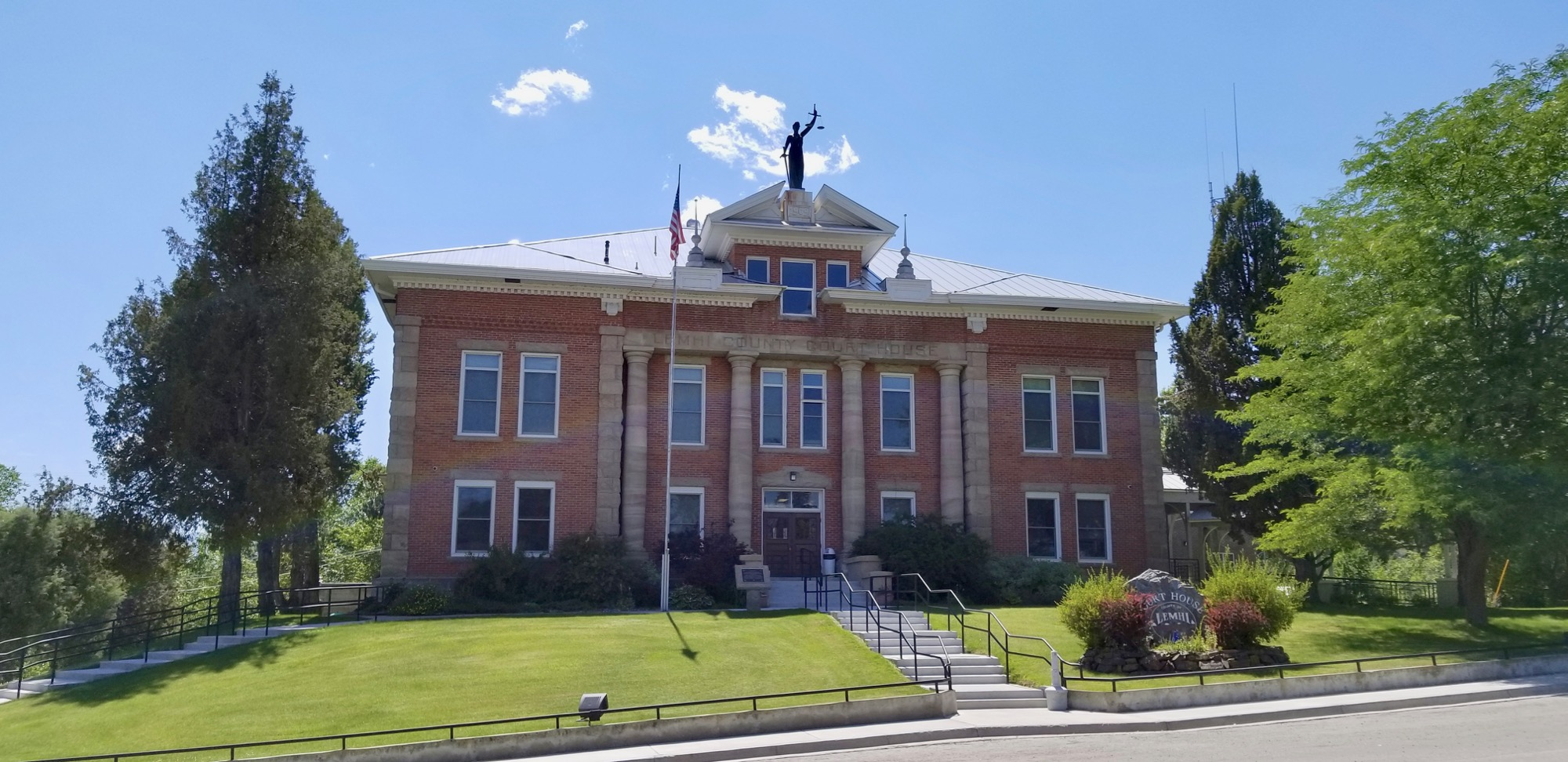

- Location within Idaho Location within the United States
- Location: 1st St., N. and Broadway, Salmon, Idaho
- Coordinates: 45°10′45″N 113°54′4″W
- Area: less than one acre
- Built: 1909-10
- Built by: Rittenhouse, C.C.
- Architect: Schultz, W.W.
- Architectural style: Classical Revival
- NRHP reference No.: 78001078
- Added to NRHP: February 7, 1978

The Lemhi County Courthouse, located at 1st Street North and Broadway in Salmon, is the county courthouse of Lemhi County, Idaho. The courthouse was built in 1909–10. Architect W. W. Schultz designed the Classical Revival building, which features four Doric columns made from carved stone in the front and a dentillated cornice broken by a dormer above the entrance. The dormer is topped by a stone statue of Lady Justice made by George Oxham; the statue is the only public sculpture in Idaho which is located atop a courthouse.

The courthouse was added to the National Register of Historic Places on February 7, 1978.
