= First Flag Unfurling Site, Lewis and Clark Trail =

- U.S. National Register of Historic Places
- Location within Idaho Location within the United States
- Location: 5 miles (8.0 km) north of Tendoy, Idaho in the Bitterroot Mountains
- Coordinates: 45°1′21″N 113°34′27″W
- Area: 5 acres (2.0 ha)
- Built: 1805
- NRHP reference No.: 75000635
- Added to NRHP: August 22, 1975

The First Flag Unfurling Site is a historic site along the route of the Lewis and Clark Expedition in Lemhi County, Idaho. The site is located in the Bitterroot Mountains, 5 miles (8.0 km) north of the community of Tendoy. According to an entry in Clark's journal on August 13, 1805, Lewis unfurled an American flag at the site to greet two women whom the party encountered. Local researcher Dave Ainsworth determined that this encounter was the first time an American flag had been unfurled west of the Continental Divide; his findings were confirmed by a National Park Service historian.

The site was added to the National Register of Historic Places on August 22, 1975. At the time, the site was marked by a historic sign, though several parties were planning to install a monument.
