= Shoop (disambiguation) =

"Shoop" is a 1993 song by Salt-n-Pepa.

Shoop may also refer to:

- Shoop (surname), including a list of people with the name
- Shoop Building, a historic office building in Racine, Wisconsin, U.S.
- Shoop Site (36DA20), a prehistoric archaeological site in Pennsylvania, U.S.

== See also ==
- Shoop Shoop (disambiguation)
