= Shoup Rock Shelters =

- U.S. National Register of Historic Places
- Nearest city: Cobalt, Idaho
- Area: 9.9 acres (4.0 ha)
- NRHP reference No.: 74000744
- Added to NRHP: November 8, 1974

The Shoup Rock Shelters are two prehistoric rock shelters located in Lemhi County, Idaho. The rock shelters, which were excavated in 1965, are located in a rift valley within the Bitterroot Range, near the Salmon River. The shelters provide evidence that the surrounding area had been occupied for at least 8000–8500 years before the present. In addition, the continuity of the archaeological remains found at the site suggests that the original inhabitants are the ancestors of the Northern Shoshone and stayed in the region permanently after settling it.

The rock shelters were added to the National Register of Historic Places on November 8, 1974.
