= Lemhi Boarding School Girls Dormitory =

- U.S. National Register of Historic Places
- Location within Idaho Location within the United States
- Nearest city: Lemhi, Idaho
- Coordinates: 44°51′43″N 113°37′48″W
- Area: less than one acre
- Built: 1903
- NRHP reference No.: 98001350
- Added to NRHP: November 12, 1998

The Lemhi Boarding School Girls Dormitory is a historic building located on Hayden Creek Road near the community of Lemhi, Idaho. The dormitory is the only surviving building from the Lemhi Reservation, the native homeland of the Lemhi Shoshone. Due to increasing white settlement in the Lemhi Valley in the 1860s, the Lemhi Shoshone requested their own reservation; they received a reservation in 1875, though it had little arable land. A government-sponsored school opened on the reservation in 1881, but it was sparsely attended due to poor conditions and its suppression of the native culture and language. The new girls' dormitory opened in 1903 to address the original dormitory's overcrowding and poor ventilation. The dormitory did not serve the reservation for long, as the government dissolved the reservation in 1907 and relocated its residents to Fort Hall. The dormitory building later served as a Grange hall and a community center for the area.

The building was added to the National Register of Historic Places on November 12, 1998.
