= Shoup (surname) =

Shoup is a surname. Notable people with the surname include:

- Carl Shoup (1902–2000), American economist
- Curtis F. Shoup (1921–1945), American Medal of Honor recipient
- David M. Shoup (1904–1983), United States Marine Corps general and Medal of Honor recipient
- Donald Shoup (1938–2025), American urban planner
- Francis A. Shoup (1834–1896), lawyer and Confederate brigadier general in the American Civil War
- George L. Shoup (1836–1904), American politician from Idaho
- Howard Shoup (1903–1987), American costume designer
- John Shoupe (1851–1920), American baseball player sometimes credited as Shoup
- Oliver Henry Shoup (1869–1940), American politician from Colorado
- Paul Shoup (1874–1946), American businessman, father of Carl Shoup
- Richard G. Shoup (1923–1995), American politician from Montana
- Richard Shoup (programmer) (1943–2015), computer programmer who developed SuperPaint
- Robert "Bob" Shoup, American wrestler The Pink Assassin and manager
- Victor Shoup, American computer scientist and mathematician
- Wally Shoup (born 1944), American jazz alto saxophonist
