= Shoup Building =

- U.S. National Register of Historic Places
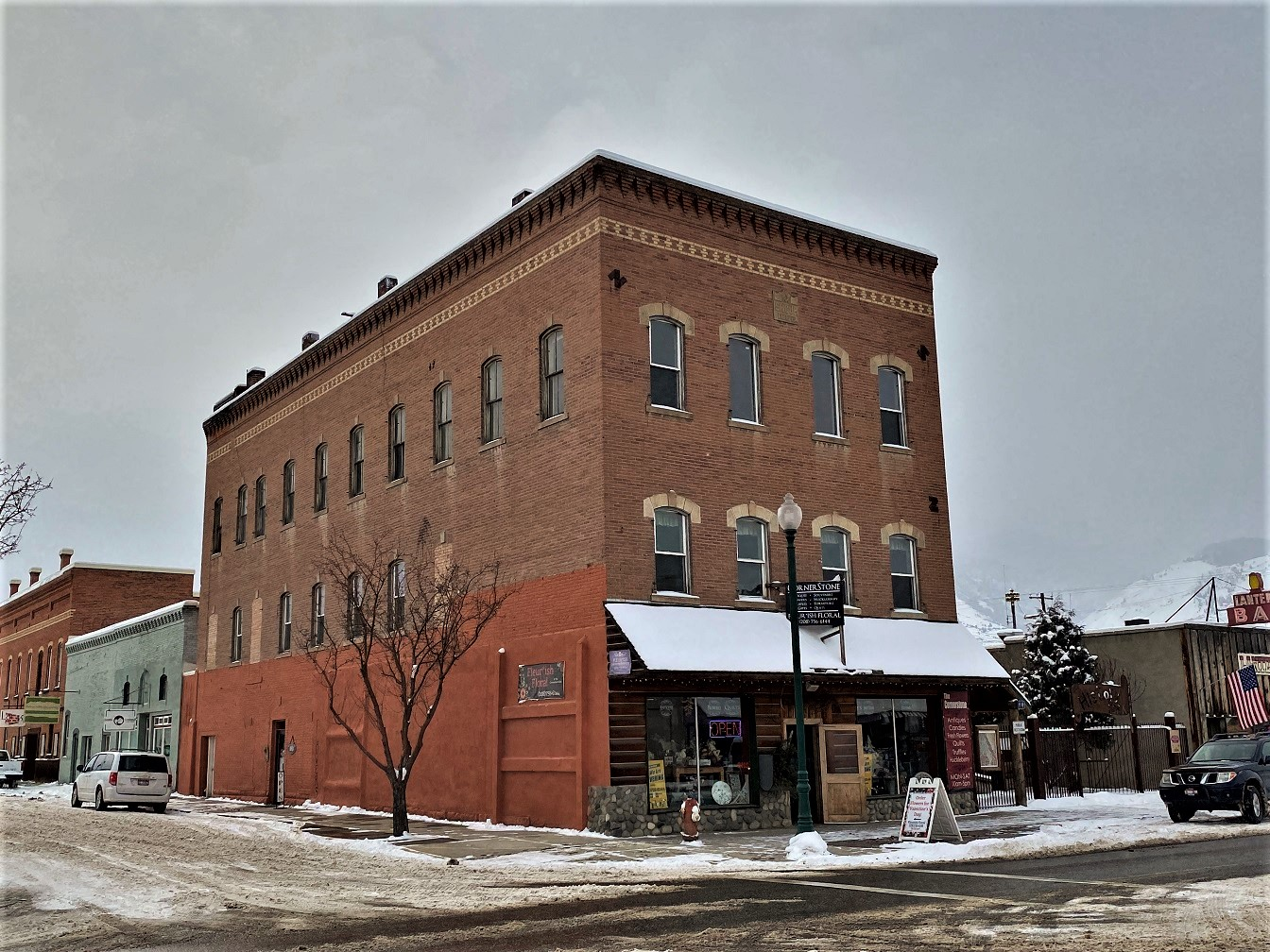

- Location within Idaho Location within the United States
- Location: Center and Main Sts. Salmon, Idaho
- Coordinates: 45°10′30″N 113°53′33″W
- Area: less than one acre
- Built: 1886
- Architect: Allan Merritt
- NRHP reference No.: 78001081
- Added to NRHP: March 31, 1978

The Shoup Building is a historic commercial building located at the intersection of Center and Main Streets in Salmon, Idaho. The three-story building was constructed in 1886 for merchant George Shoup; Shoup went on to become the first Governor of Idaho. The building was one of the most architecturally exquisite in territorial Idaho, and state and local newspapers praised the structure upon its completion. The brick building's design features segmental arched windows and a brick cornice with a red and white band of brick below it. Shoup used the first floor of the building for his store; the second floor held the Lemhi County courts, and the third floor served as the local Masonic hall.

The building was added to the National Register of Historic Places on March 31, 1978.
