= Lemhi River =

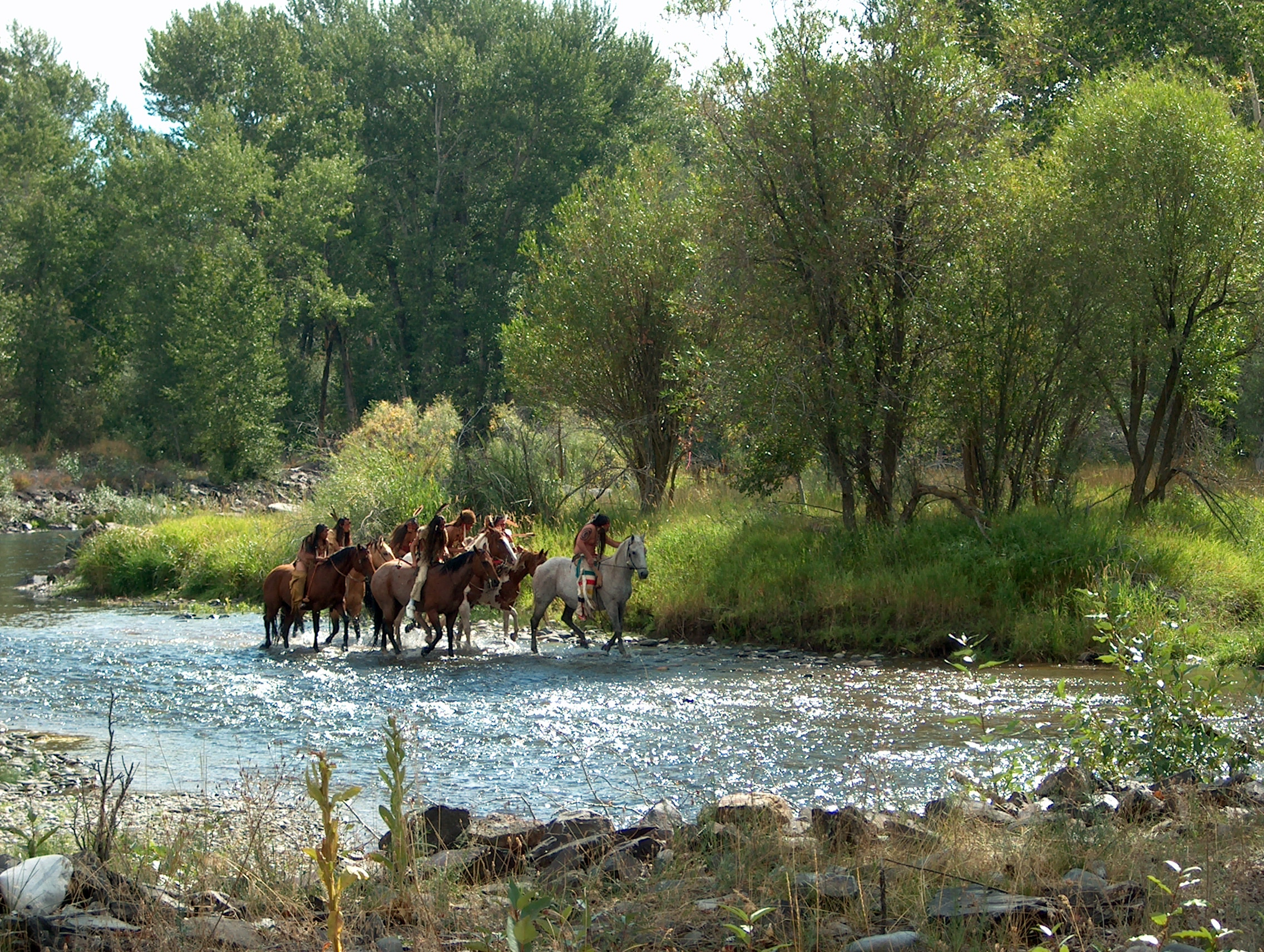
- Historical reenactment on the Lemhi River

- Location of the mouth of the Lemhi River in Idaho Lemhi River (the United States)

Location
- Country: United States
- State: Idaho
- Counties: Lemhi
- Cities: Leadore, Salmon

Physical characteristics
- Source
  - coordinates: 44°40′56″N 113°21′17″W
  - elevation: 5,954 ft (1,815 m)
- Mouth: Salmon River
  - location: Salmon
  - coordinates: 45°11′17″N 113°54′23″W
  - elevation: 3,900 ft (1,200 m)
- Length: 60 mi (97 km)
- Basin size: 1,216 sq mi (3,150 km^{2})
- Discharge
  - location: near mouth at Salmon, ID
  - average: 251 cu ft/s (7.1 m^{3}/s)
  - minimum: 0.75 cu ft/s (0.021 m^{3}/s)
  - maximum: 2,610 cu ft/s (74 m^{3}/s)

The Lemhi River is a 60-mile-long (97 km) river in Idaho in the United States. It is a tributary of the Salmon River, which in turn is a tributary to the Snake River and Columbia River.

== Course ==
From its source near Leadore and the confluence of several headwater streams, the Lemhi River flows generally northwest, through the Lemhi Valley, between the Lemhi Range to the west, and the Bitterroot Range and Beaverhead Mountains to the east. The Lemhi River flows into the Salmon River at the city of Salmon.

== River modification ==
The water of the Lemhi River and its tributaries is used for irrigation agriculture. Of the river's mainstem tributaries, only 7% are not totally disconnected year round due to diversion for irrigation.

== History ==
In August 1805 Lewis and Clark crossed the continental divide at the Lemhi Pass 10 miles (16 km) to the east of the Lemhi River. There, the group encountered a tribe of Shoshone Indians, one of whom turned out to be Cameahwait, brother of Sacagawea. The expedition sent a reconnaissance party, guided by Swooping Eagle, north along the Lemhi to the Salmon River attempting to find a navigable path, but turned back when they found that the Salmon was not passable by boat or on land.

== See also ==
- Lemhi (disambiguation)
- List of rivers in Idaho
- List of longest streams of Idaho
