= Shoop (surname) =

Shoop is a surname. Notable people with the surname include:

- Bob Shoop (born 1966), American football coach and player
- Brian Shoop, American college baseball coach and player
- Clarence A. Shoop (1907–1968), American pilot
- John Shoop (born 1969), American football coach
- Lindsay Shoop (born 1981), American rower
- Pamela Susan Shoop (born 1948), American actress
- Ron Shoop (1931–2003), American baseball player
- Rusty Shoop, American television journalist
