= Lemhi, Idaho =

Unincorporated community in the state of Idaho, United States

- Unincorporated community
- Location within Idaho Location within the United States
- Coordinates: 44°51′06″N 113°37′11″W
- Country: United States
- State: Idaho
- County: Lemhi
- Elevation: 5,200 ft (1,600 m)
- Time zone: UTC-7 (Mountain (MST))
  - Summer (DST): UTC-6 (MDT)
- ZIP code: 83465
- Area codes: 208, 986
- GNIS feature ID: 396781

Lemhi is an unincorporated community in Lemhi County, Idaho, United States. Lemhi is located along Idaho State Highway 28 and the Lemhi River, 8 miles (13 km) south of Tendoy and 18 miles (29 km) northwest of Leadore. Lemhi has a post office with ZIP code 83465.

== History ==
Lemhi's population was just 5 in 1960.

== See also ==
- Fort Lemhi
- Lemhi Pass
