= Cobalt, Idaho =

Unincorporated community in the state of Idaho, United States

Cobalt is an unincorporated community in Lemhi County, in the central part of the U.S. state of Idaho. Cobalt is located at 45°05′35″N 114°13′54″W at an elevation of 5046 feet.

Cobalt's population was estimated at 250 in 1960.
