= Lemhi Pass =

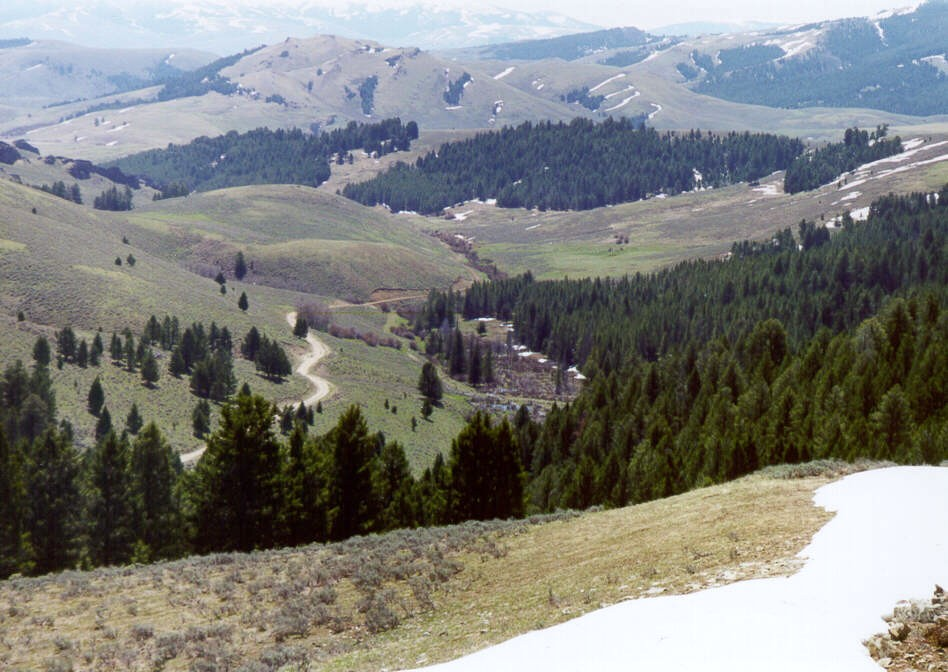
- View from Lemhi Pass
- Interactive map of Lemhi Pass
- Elevation: 7,373 ft (2,247 m)
- Traversed by: Unpaved road

Location
- Location: Lemhi County, Idaho / Beaverhead County, Montana, United States
- Range: Bitterroot Range of the Rocky Mountains
- Coordinates: 44°58′27″N 113°26′42″W

- Lemhi Pass
- U.S. National Register of Historic Places
- U.S. National Historic Landmark
- Location within Idaho Location within the United States
- Nearest city: Tendoy, Idaho
- Coordinates: 44°58′27″N 113°26′42″W
- NRHP reference No.: 66000313

Significant dates
- Added to NRHP: October 15, 1966
- Designated NHL: October 9, 1960

Lemhi Pass is a high mountain pass in the Bitterroot Range of the Rocky Mountains. The pass lies on the Montana-Idaho border of the Continental Divide, at an elevation of 7,373 feet (2,247 m) above sea level. It is accessed via Lemhi Pass Road in Montana, and the Lewis and Clark Highway in Idaho. Both are gravel roads. Warm Springs Road, which roughly follows the divide in Montana, passes just west of the pass's high point.

== History ==
The pass gained importance in the 18th century, when the Lemhi Shoshone acquired horses and used the route to travel between the two main parts of their homeland. From the time of the Louisiana Purchase in 1803 until the Oregon Treaty in 1846 the pass marked the western border of the United States. On August 12, 1805 Meriwether Lewis and three other members of the Lewis and Clark Expedition crossed the Continental Divide at Lemhi Pass. Lewis found a "large and plain Indian road" over the pass. This was the first time that white men had seen present-day Idaho:

We proceeded to the top of the dividing ridge from which I discovered immense ranges of high mountains still to the West of us with their tops partially covered in snow

The next day Lewis met Cameahwait and his band of Shoshone, and returned with them across the pass to meet Clark. On August 26, 1805 the entire expedition crossed the pass.

In the early 19th century the pass was regularly used by the Blackfoot people, so that in 1824 Alexander Ross referred to the route as the Blackfoot route. At that time the pass itself was known as North Pass, to distinguish it from South Pass. The pass derives its present name from Fort Lemhi, founded in 1855 by Mormon missionaries who were the first non-Indians to establish a sustained relationship with the Salmon River Indian people.

During the mining era the pass was used by stagecoaches, but the route fell into disuse after 1910, when the Gilmore and Pittsburgh Railroad was built through the nearby Bannock Pass. Only a single track dirt road now crosses the pass.

The pass was designated a National Historic Landmark in 1960.

== Mineral resources ==
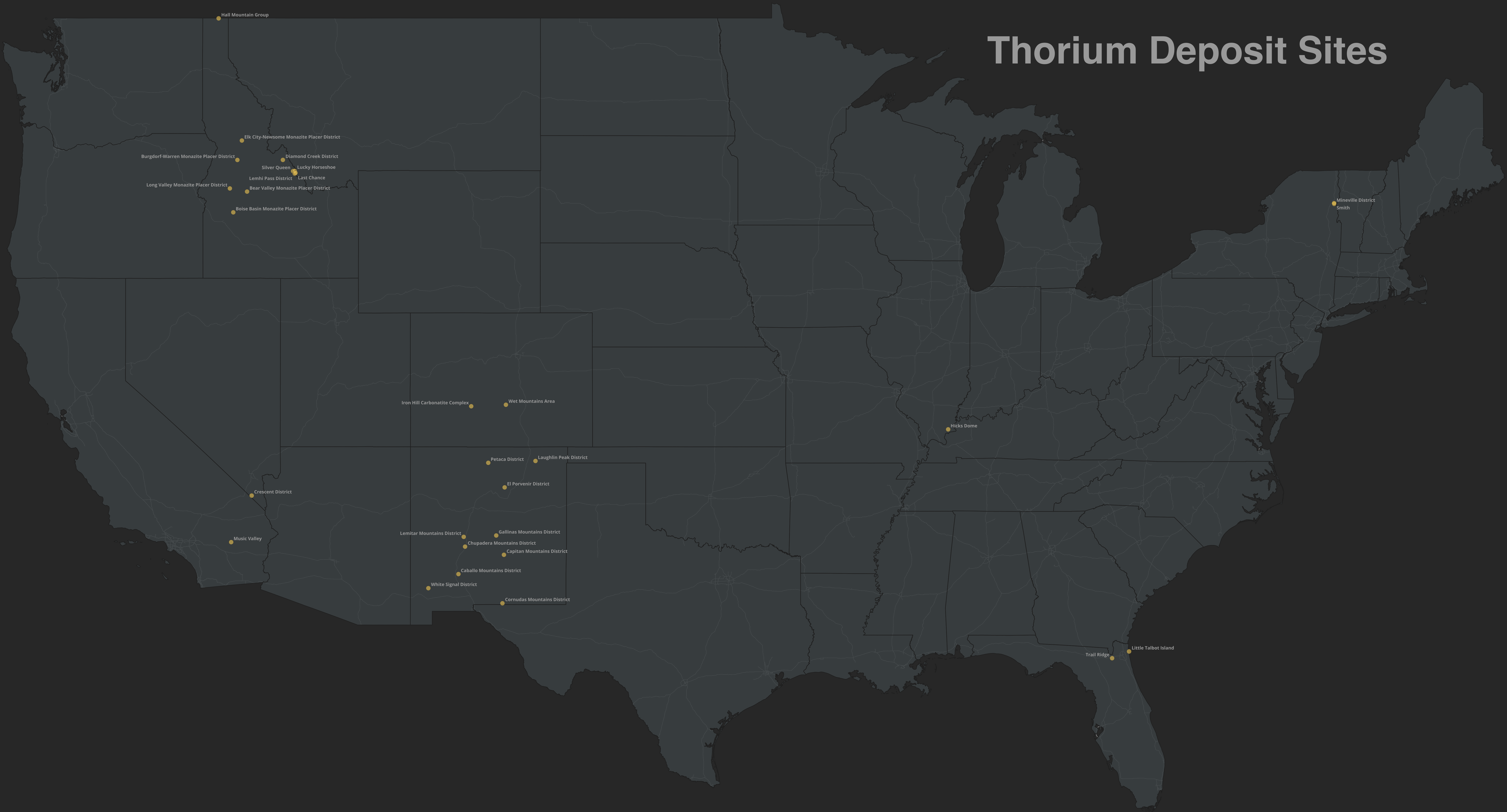
Thorium deposit sites in the US

The Lemhi Pass district has been found to host many lanthanide minerals and the richest deposit of thorium in the US. In a study of 31 samples taken from 21 different veins, the ratio of rare-earth elements (REEs) in the area is estimated to be between 0.05-9.2%. This depends largely on the localized mineralogy and REE mineralization. Most commonly the thorium is found as thorite hosted in quartz veins, whereas REEs are contained within monazite.

The deposits lie within quartz veins hosted in Precambrian rock with minerals such as hematite, apatite, feldspar, thorite and monazite present. The monazite is found to be enriched in the middle rare earths, specifically neodymium (Nd), as there is estimated to be 35 weight percent of Nd in the monazite. Neodymium, cerium, gadolinium, yttrium, and dysprosium are the top lanthanide minerals recorded to be attainable in the Lemhi Pass.

== See also ==
- Mountain passes in Montana
- List of National Historic Landmarks in Idaho
- List of National Historic Landmarks in Montana
- National Register of Historic Places listings in Lemhi County, Idaho
- National Register of Historic Places listings in Beaverhead County, Montana
