= Salmon River (Idaho) =

River in Idaho, United States

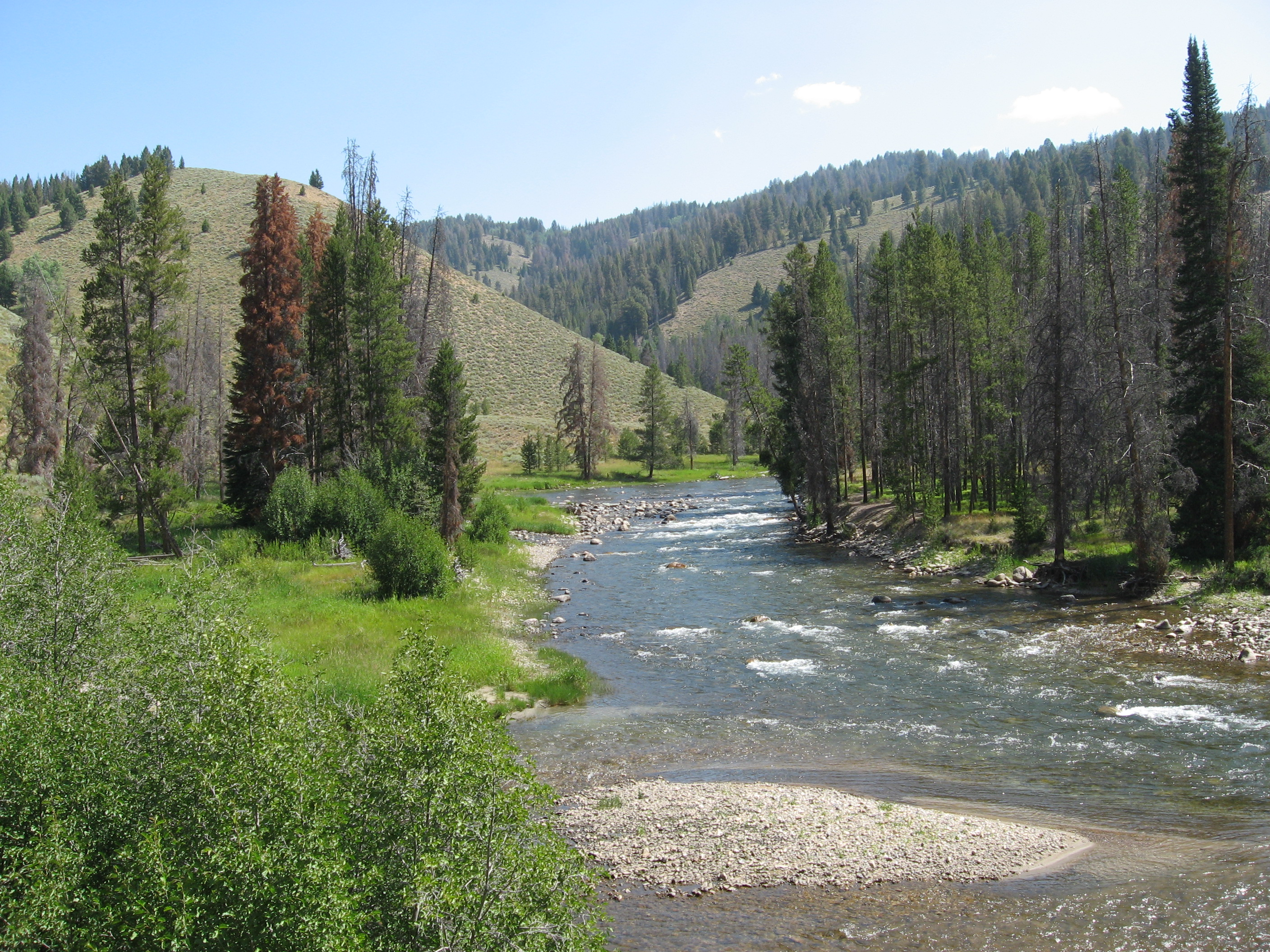
- Salmon River in Sawtooth NRA

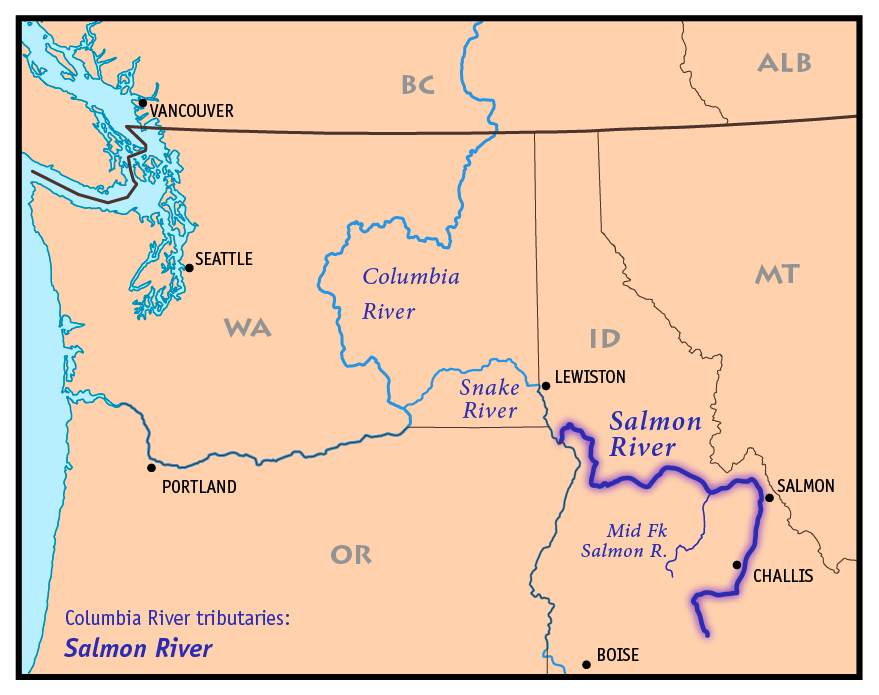
- Map of the Salmon River, showing its Middle Fork tributary and connection to the Columbia River via the Snake River
- Nickname: River of No Return

Location
- Country: United States
- State: Idaho
- Cities: Salmon, Challis

Physical characteristics
- Source: Sawtooth Range
  - location: near Norton Peak, Blaine County
  - coordinates: 43°47′48″N 114°46′36″W
  - elevation: 9,220 ft (2,810 m)
- Mouth: Snake River
  - location: west of White Bird, Idaho and Nez Perce Counties
  - coordinates: 45°51′23″N 116°47′37″W
  - elevation: 919 ft (280 m)
- Length: 425 mi (684 km)
- Basin size: 14,000 mi^{2} (36,000 km^{2})
- Discharge
  - location: White Bird
  - average: 11,100 cu ft/s (83,000 US gal/s; 310 m^{3}/s)
  - minimum: 1,000 cu ft/s (7,500 US gal/s; 28 m^{3}/s)
  - maximum: 129,000 cu ft/s (960,000 US gal/s; 3,700 m^{3}/s)

Basin features
- Progression: Snake River → Columbia River → Pacific Ocean
- Tributaries
  - left: Yankee Fork, Panther Creek, Middle Fork Salmon River, South Fork Salmon River, Little Salmon River
  - right: East Fork Salmon River, Pahsimeroi River, Lemhi River, North Fork Salmon River

National Wild and Scenic River
- Type: Wild, Recreational
- Designated: July 23, 1980

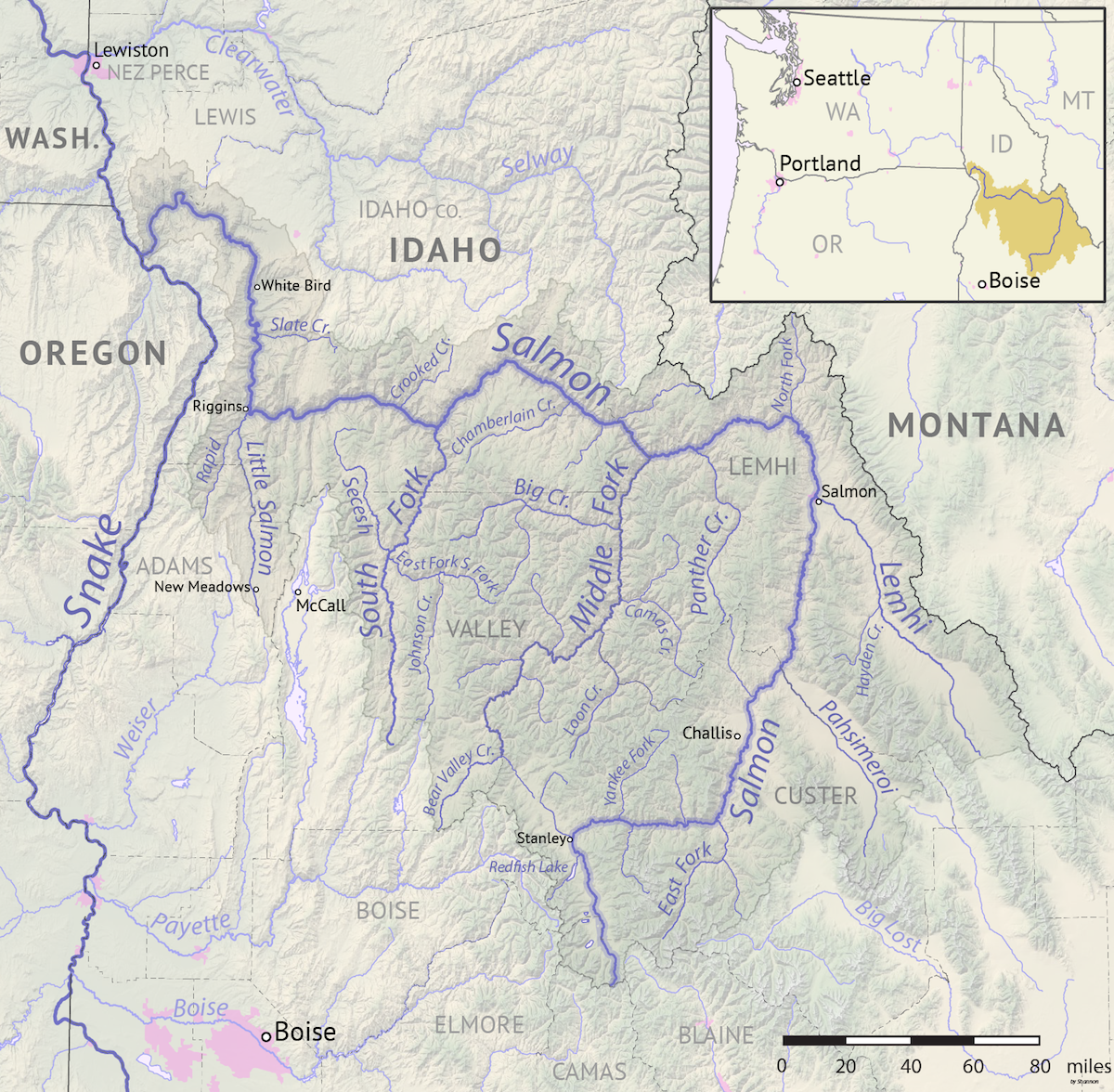
Map of the Salmon River drainage basin with tributaries

The Salmon River, also known as the "River of No Return", is a river located in the U.S. state of Idaho in the western United States. It flows for 425 miles (685 km) through central Idaho, draining a rugged, thinly populated watershed of 14,000 square miles (36,000 km^{2}). The river drops more than 7,000 feet (2,100 m) from its headwaters, near Galena Summit above the Sawtooth Valley in the Sawtooth National Recreation Area, to its confluence with the Snake River. Measured at White Bird, its average discharge is 11,060 cubic feet per second (82,700 US gal/s; 313 m^{3}/s). The Salmon River is the longest undammed river in the contiguous United States.

Settlements located along the Salmon River include Stanley, Clayton, Challis, Salmon, Riggins, and White Bird. Redfish Lake and Little Redfish Lake, which flow into the river via Redfish Lake Creek, are the termini of the longest Pacific sockeye salmon migration in North America. The lower half of the river provides the time zone boundary for the state, with northern Idaho on Pacific Time and the rest of the state on Mountain Time.

== Course ==
The Salmon River originates from and flows through the mountains of central and eastern Idaho (Lemhi Range, Sawtooth, Salmon River Mountains, Clearwater and Bitterroot Range). The main stem rises in the Sawtooth Range at over 9,200 feet (2,800 m) in elevation, several miles northwest of Norton Peak. For the first thirty miles (50 km), it flows north through the Sawtooth Valley, then turns east at Stanley, receiving the Yankee Fork shortly below that point and the East Fork further downstream. The river then flows northeast, receiving the Pahsimeroi River at Ellis and then the Lemhi River at Salmon east of the Lemhi Range.

North of Salmon, the river is joined at its North Fork, before turning west into over 200 miles (320 km) of continuous canyons through the Salmon River and Clearwater Mountains – some of the most rugged and isolated terrain in the contiguous United States. Exhibiting upwards of 7,000 feet (2,130 m) of vertical relief, the Salmon River canyons are some of the deepest in the U.S., surpassing the Grand Canyon and second only to the Snake River's Hells Canyon, nearby on the Idaho–Oregon border. Here, the river is joined by its two largest tributaries, the Middle Fork and South Fork. Ten miles (16 km) downstream (west) of its confluence with the Middle Fork, the Salmon River becomes the dividing line for the two time zones in Idaho: Mountain Time to the south, Pacific Time to the north, bisecting the state at approximately 45½ degrees north latitude.

The river turns abruptly north at the confluence with the Little Salmon River at Riggins, about 87 miles (140 km) above its mouth. From there the river flows almost due north, with U.S. Route 95 crossing the river on the "Time Zone Bridge" just north of Riggins, and then travels on its east bank until a few miles before White Bird. The highway splits north to climb White Bird Hill while the river loops northwest and then south to its confluence with the Snake River north of Hells Canyon, fifteen miles (25 km) south of the Washington border and 40 miles (65 km) upstream of Lewiston. Excluding Alaska, the Salmon River is the longest river system contained entirely within a single U.S. state.

== History ==
=== Anthropology ===
The Salmon River area has been home to people for at least the last 8,000 years. At European contact, much of the area was inhabited by several tribes, including the Nez Perce. The river was considered sacred ground and a rich source of food for the indigenous people of the area, who relied on the abundant salmon species and other wildlife.

=== Exploration ===
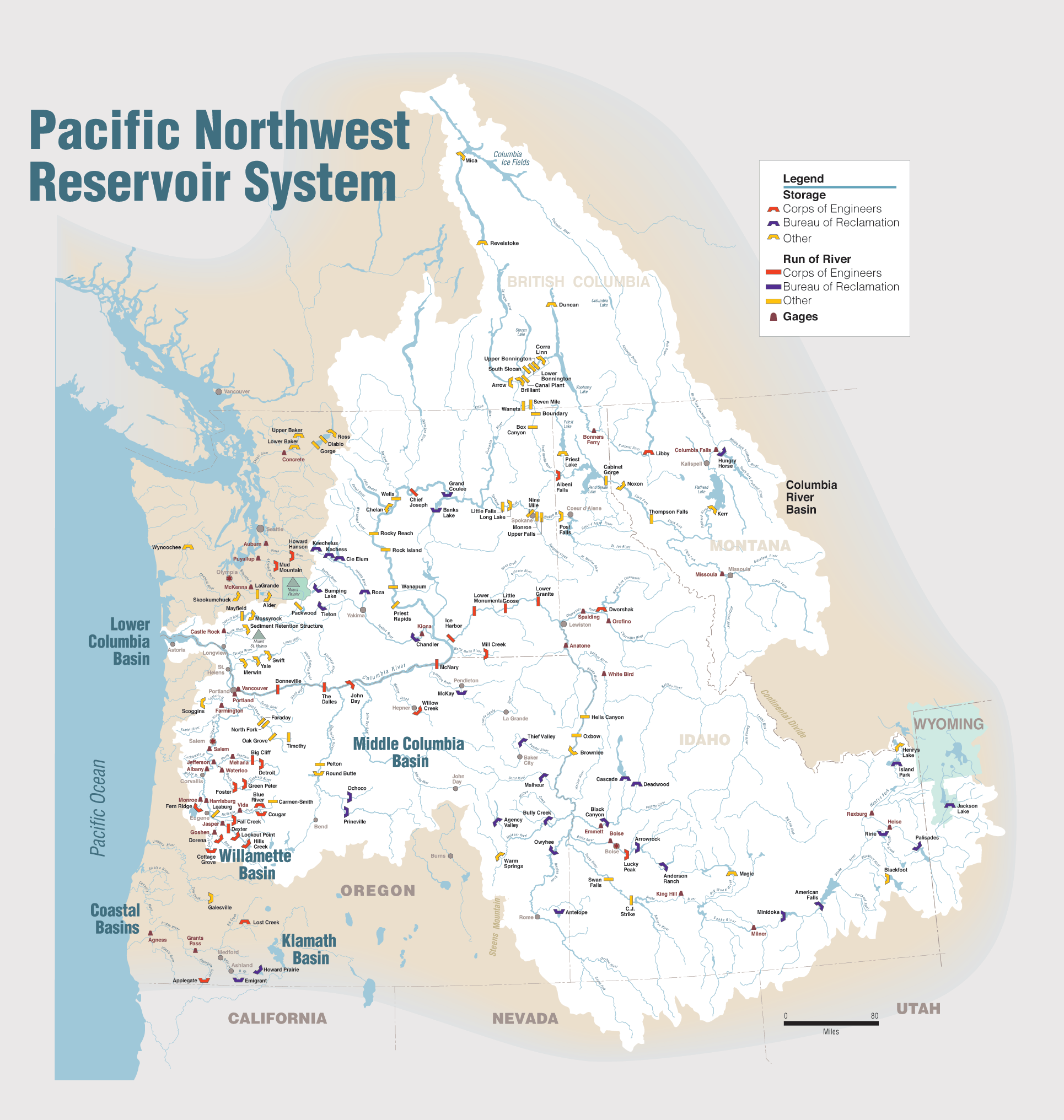
Columbia River Basin

In August 1805, just after crossing the Continental Divide, Lewis and Clark ventured down the Salmon River, but found it to be too rough to be navigable. Clark wrote:

... I shall in justice to Capt. Lewis who was the first white man ever on this fork of the Columbia Call this Louis's river. ... The Westerly fork of the Columbia River [the present Salmon River] is double the size of the Easterley fork [the present Lemhi River] & below those forks the river is ... 100 yards [90 m] wide, it is very rapid & Sholey water Clear but little timber.

The honor didn't last long; by 1810, maps of the area were already referring to "Louis' River" as the Salmon. Clark had thought that the Salmon River was the Snake River, thus he called it the "Westerly fork of the Columbia". The Snake River retained the variant name "Lewis River" or "Lewis Fork" longer than did the Salmon.

In the Early to Mid 19th Century other explorers arrived to the Salmon River and ultimately stayed. These early explorers included Frank Lance, Francis, Hank the Hermit, and most well known and storied Buckskin Bill. Sylvan Ambrose Hart (Buckskin Bill) was one of the last Mountain Men to inhabit the Salmon River Canyon at 5 Mile Bar. He arrived to the canyon in/around 1928 from the Oklahoma Territory. For nearly 50 years he lived at 5 Mile Bar and spent less than 50 dollars a year on staples like coffee, tea, chocolate, sugar, flour, etc. Buckskin was a true craftsman in his own right forging his own knives, pistols, rifles, kettles, pots, and pans. Buckskin died in 1980 and his cabin at 5 mile bar has been turned into a museum.

=== Gold ===
In the 1860s, placer deposits of gold were found along the river, and a gold rush began. Miners came to the area, causing clashes with the Nez Perce on their ancestral tribal lands. Many historic and present day mines (including dredging operations) can be seen while traveling along the river.

== Recreation ==
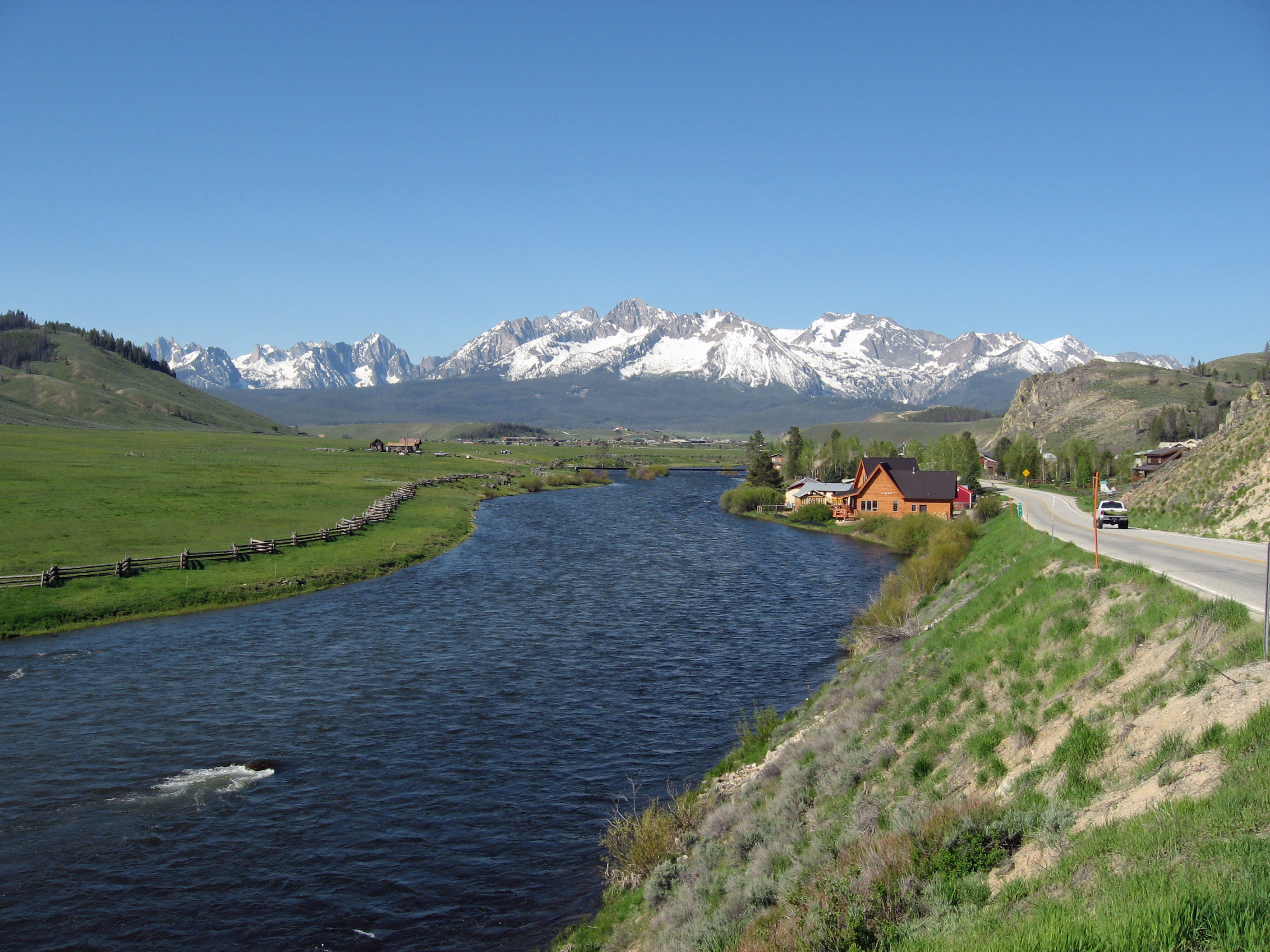
Salmon River and Sawtooth Mountains from Lower Stanley

Several national forests and Sawtooth National Recreation Area provide for numerous recreation opportunities within the river's watershed. Two segments (the Middle Fork and a section of the main Salmon River, known as the Main Fork) are protected as National Wild and Scenic Rivers. The Middle Fork was one of the original eight rivers designated Wild and Scenic in 1968, and is often considered the "crown jewel" of the Wild and Scenic system.

The Salmon is a popular destination for whitewater kayaking, canoeing, and rafting. The canyons of the Salmon allow for magnificent views of the complex geology of the region. The Frank Church-River of No Return Wilderness Area includes one of the deepest canyons in the continental United States, which at roughly 7,000 feet (2,130 m) of vertical relief, is deeper than the Grand Canyon. Outdoor Lodges dot the main canyon of the Salmon River from Salmon, Idaho to Riggins, Idaho. Often the only way to access these lodges is either by motorized boats, rafting trips, hiking, and even some isolated airstrips.

Both the Middle Fork and Main Fork travel through the Frank Church-River of No Return Wilderness Area. The Middle Fork is about 110 miles (180 km) long, while the Main Fork is about 81 miles (130 km) in length. The Middle Fork raft trip run ends 7 miles (11 km) prior to the beginning of the Main Fork run; Corn Creek is the start of the Main Fork section of the Salmon River.

The South Fork of the Salmon flows through Payette National Forest and enters the Wild and Scenic Main Fork at Mackay Bar. The Main Fork raft trip ends about 25 miles (40 km) east of Riggins, either at Vinegar Creek or Carey Creek, marking the beginning of the Lower Salmon rafting section. Boating companies offer both single and multiple day trips on the river.

The Middle Fork of the Salmon River is known as one of the best catch and release fly fisheries in the nation. Other recreational activities along the river include camping, hiking and mountain biking.

== Wildlife ==
The Salmon River historically produced 45 percent of all the steelhead (ocean-going rainbow trout) and 45 percent of all the spring and summer chinook salmon in the entire Columbia River Basin. The Salmon River basin contains most (up to 70 percent) of the remaining salmon and steelhead habitat in the Columbia River Basin. Despite abundant, excellent salmon habitat in the Salmon River basin, chinook, steelhead, and sockeye salmon populations have not significantly recovered, despite listings under the federal Endangered Species Act since the mid-1990s. Populations remain at risk in large part because of the negative effects of four federal dams and reservoirs on the lower Snake river, through which both juvenile salmon and returning adults must pass. Many Northwest salmon advocates, commercial & sportfishermen call for removal of the Lower Granite, Little Goose, Lower Monumental, and Ice Harbor dams to address survival problems. As of November 2015, controversy continues in politics, public discourse, and in federal court, where federal salmon recovery plans are under legal challenge.

== USGS stations ==
The United States Geological Survey operates four stream gauge water level monitoring stations on the main stem of the Salmon River and 17 others on its tributaries. Real time data is available for each station on the USGS website. For a map of these see Salmon River USGS Station Map or in the box at right.

USGS stations in the Salmon River watershed as of August 12, 2012
Stream	Location	Site number	Coordinates	Drainage area	Avg discharge	Max discharge	Min discharge	Website
Salmon River	Clayton, ID	13296500	44°16′06″N 114°43′58″W	807 mi^{2} (2,090 km^{2})	974 cu ft/s (27.6 m^{3}/s)	10,400 cu ft/s (290 m^{3}/s)	160 cu ft/s (4.5 m^{3}/s)	
Salmon River	Salmon, ID	13302500	45°11′01″N 113°53′43″W	3,737 mi^{2} (9,680 km^{2})	1,923 cu ft/s (54.5 m^{3}/s)	17,700 cu ft/s (500 m^{3}/s)	242 cu ft/s (6.9 m^{3}/s)	
Salmon River	Shoup, ID	13307000	45°19′21″N 114°26′24″W	6,239 mi^{2} (16,160 km^{2})	2,913 cu ft/s (82.5 m^{3}/s)	25,700 cu ft/s (730 m^{3}/s)	600 cu ft/s (17 m^{3}/s)	
Salmon River	White Bird, ID	13317000	45°45′01″N 116°19′26″W	13,421 mi^{2} (34,760 km^{2})	11,090 cu ft/s (314 m^{3}/s)	130,000 cu ft/s (3,700 m^{3}/s)	1,000 cu ft/s (28 m^{3}/s)	
Valley Creek	Stanley, ID	13295000	44°13′21″N 114°55′52″W	147 mi^{2} (380 km^{2})	198 cu ft/s (5.6 m^{3}/s)	2,210 cu ft/s (63 m^{3}/s)	34 cu ft/s (0.96 m^{3}/s)	
Yankee Fork Salmon River	Clayton, ID	13296000	44°16′44″N 114°44′02″W	189 mi^{2} (490 km^{2})	198 cu ft/s (5.6 m^{3}/s)	3,360 cu ft/s (95 m^{3}/s)	10 cu ft/s (0.28 m^{3}/s)	
Thompson Creek	Clayton, ID	13297330	44°16′13″N 114°31′00″W	29.1 mi^{2} (75 km^{2})	16.8 cu ft/s (0.48 m^{3}/s)	442 cu ft/s (12.5 m^{3}/s)	1.0 cu ft/s (0.028 m^{3}/s)	
Squaw Creek	Clayton, ID	13297355	44°17′27″N 114°28′18″W	71.6 mi^{2} (185 km^{2})	33.2 cu ft/s (0.94 m^{3}/s)	755 cu ft/s (21.4 m^{3}/s)	3.3 cu ft/s (0.093 m^{3}/s)	
Pahsimeroi River	Ellis, ID	13302005	44°41′30″N 114°02′49″W	830 mi^{2} (2,100 km^{2})	230 cu ft/s (6.5 m^{3}/s)	710 cu ft/s (20 m^{3}/s)	87 cu ft/s (2.5 m^{3}/s)	
Lemhi River	Lemhi, ID	13305000	44°56′24″N 113°38′21″W	897 mi^{2} (2,320 km^{2})	257 cu ft/s (7.3 m^{3}/s)	2,430 cu ft/s (69 m^{3}/s)	22 cu ft/s (0.62 m^{3}/s)	
Lemhi River	Salmon, ID	13305310	45°07′58″N 113°47′56″W	1,216 mi^{2} (3,150 km^{2})	258 cu ft/s (7.3 m^{3}/s)	2,920 cu ft/s (83 m^{3}/s)	0.75 cu ft/s (0.021 m^{3}/s)	
Blackbird Creek	Cobalt, ID	13306336	45°05′29″N 114°17′53″W	Unknown	6.8 cu ft/s (0.19 m^{3}/s)	100 cu ft/s (2.8 m^{3}/s)	2 cu ft/s (0.057 m^{3}/s)	
Panther Creek	Cobalt, ID	13306370	45°05′23″N 114°14′12″W	Unknown	57.6 cu ft/s (1.63 m^{3}/s)	1,100 cu ft/s (31 m^{3}/s)	3.5 cu ft/s (0.099 m^{3}/s)	
Napias Creek	Leesburg, ID	13306385	45°12′20″N 114°08′02″W	41.1 mi^{2} (106 km^{2})	29.2 cu ft/s (0.83 m^{3}/s)	1,020 cu ft/s (29 m^{3}/s)	3.5 cu ft/s (0.099 m^{3}/s)	
Middle Fork Salmon River	Yellow Pine, ID	13309220	44°43′18″N 115°00′59″W	1,042 mi^{2} (2,700 km^{2})	1,413 cu ft/s (40.0 m^{3}/s)	20,900 cu ft/s (590 m^{3}/s)	190 cu ft/s (5.4 m^{3}/s)	
Middle Fork Salmon River	Shoup, ID	13310199	45°17′37″N 114°35′47″W	2,876 mi^{2} (7,450 km^{2})	2,818 cu ft/s (79.8 m^{3}/s)	28,600 cu ft/s (810 m^{3}/s)	349 cu ft/s (9.9 m^{3}/s)	
South Fork Salmon River	Krassel Ranger Station	13310700	44°59′13″N 115°43′30″W	330 mi^{2} (850 km^{2})	535 cu ft/s (15.1 m^{3}/s)	9,710 cu ft/s (275 m^{3}/s)	38 cu ft/s (1.1 m^{3}/s)	
East Fork South Fork Salmon River	Stibnite, ID	13311000	44°54′21″N 115°19′42″W	19.3 mi^{2} (50 km^{2})	25.6 cu ft/s (0.72 m^{3}/s)	394 cu ft/s (11.2 m^{3}/s)	2.0 cu ft/s (0.057 m^{3}/s)	
Sugar Creek	Stibnite, ID	13311450	44°56′10.9″N 115°20′14.0″W	Unknown	22.9 cu ft/s (0.65 m^{3}/s)	185 cu ft/s (5.2 m^{3}/s)	5.5 cu ft/s (0.16 m^{3}/s)	
Johnson Creek	Yellow Pine, ID	13313000	44°57′42″N 115°30′00″W	218 mi^{2} (560 km^{2})	344 cu ft/s (9.7 m^{3}/s)	6,250 cu ft/s (177 m^{3}/s)	21 cu ft/s (0.59 m^{3}/s)	
Little Salmon River	Riggins, ID	13316500	45°24′47″N 116°19′31″W	576 mi^{2} (1,490 km^{2})	776 cu ft/s (22.0 m^{3}/s)	12,600 cu ft/s (360 m^{3}/s)	54 cu ft/s (1.5 m^{3}/s)	

== Gallery ==
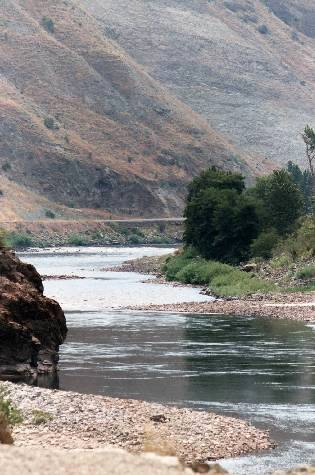
Salmon River, north of Riggins

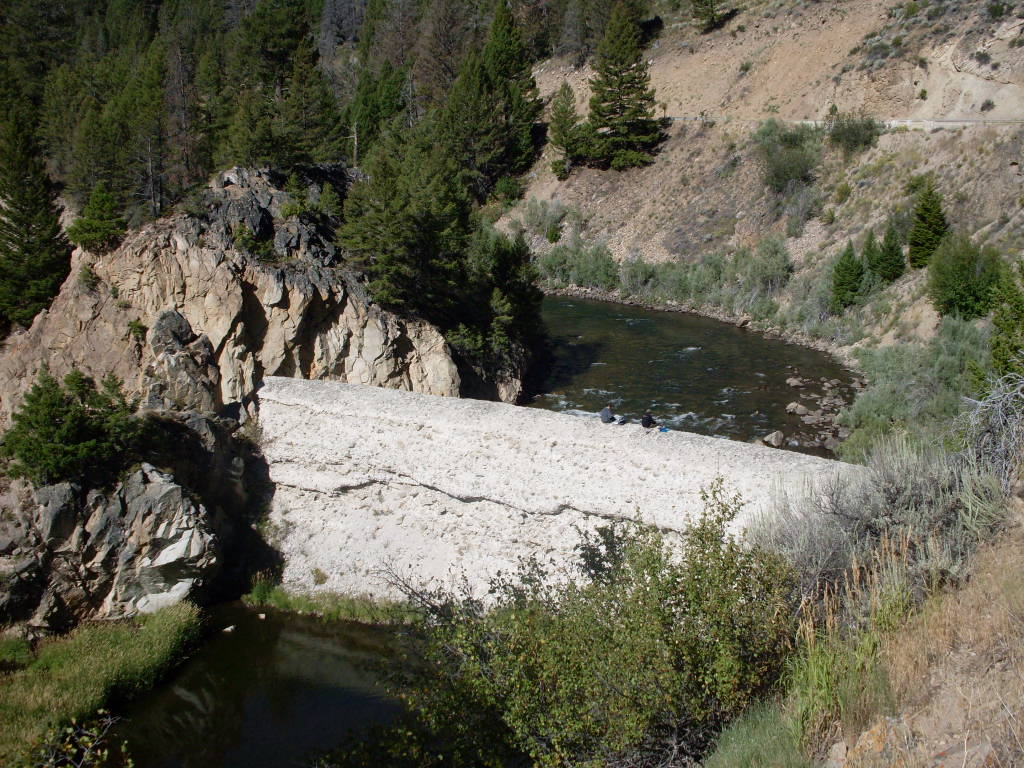
Breached Sunbeam Dam on the Salmon

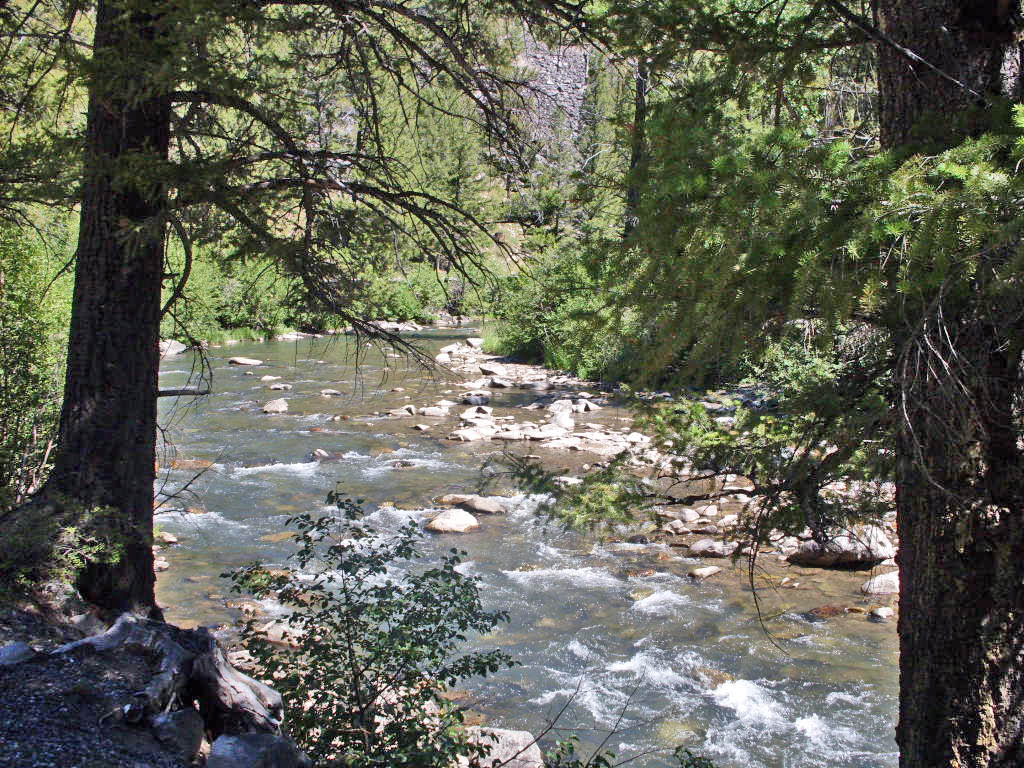
Yankee Fork of the Salmon

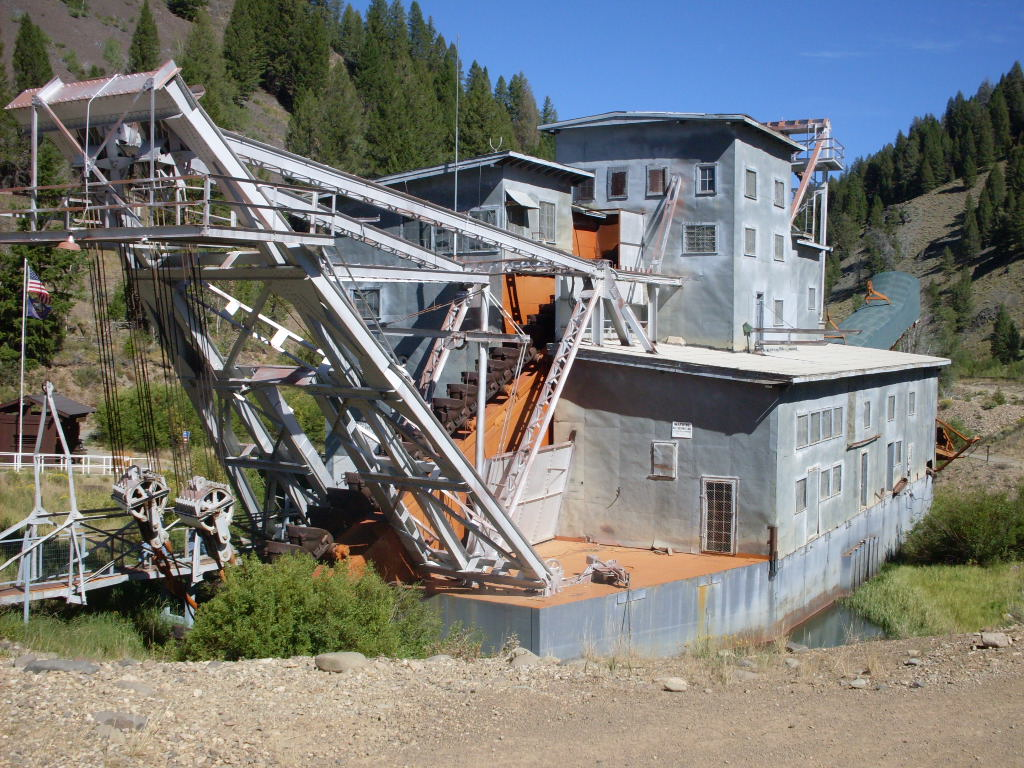
Yankee Fork Gold Dredge

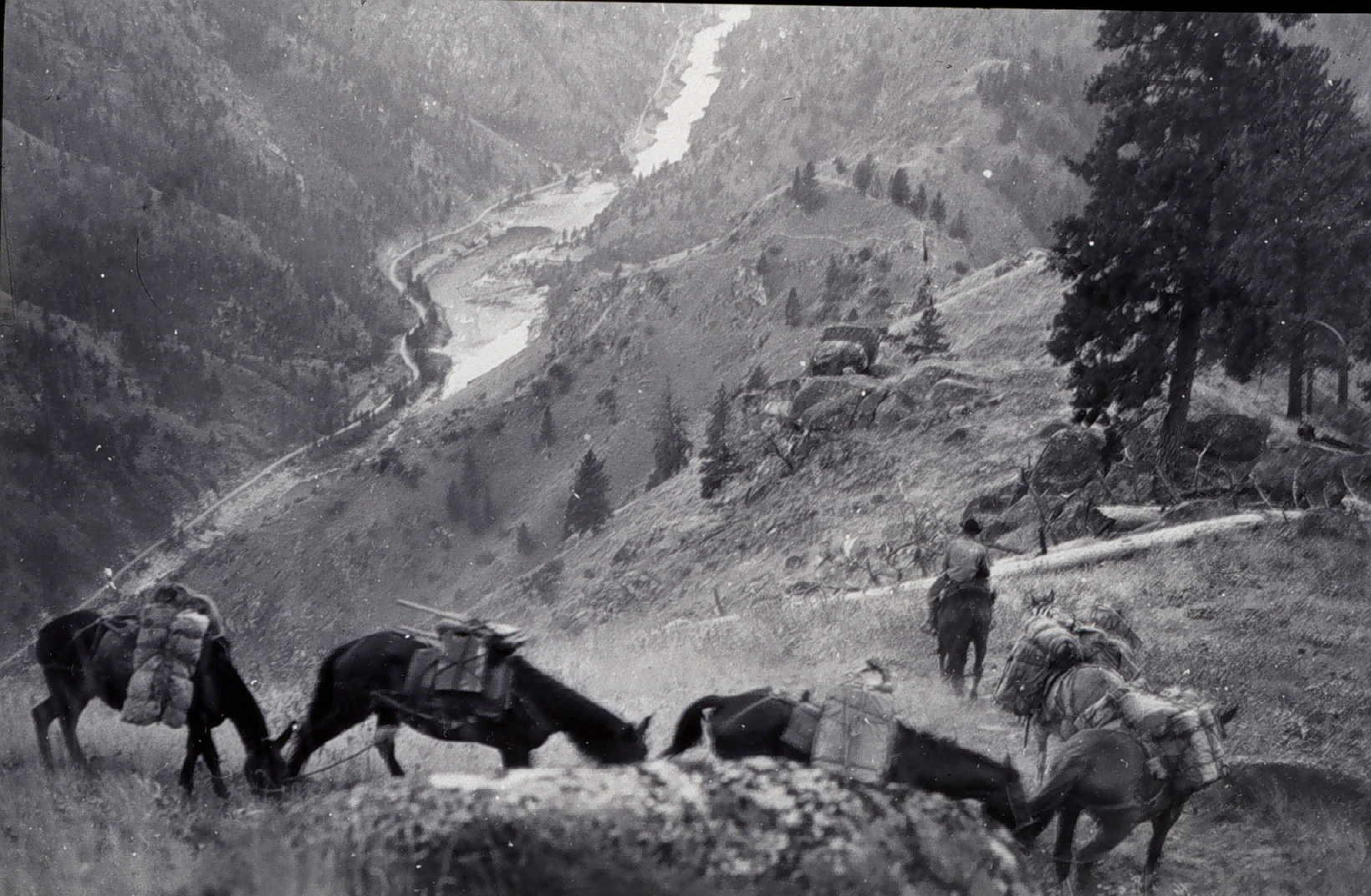
Salmon River Canyon 1945

== See also ==
- List of Idaho rivers
- List of longest streams of Idaho
- List of National Wild and Scenic Rivers
