= Tendoy, Idaho =

Unincorporated community in the state of Idaho, United States

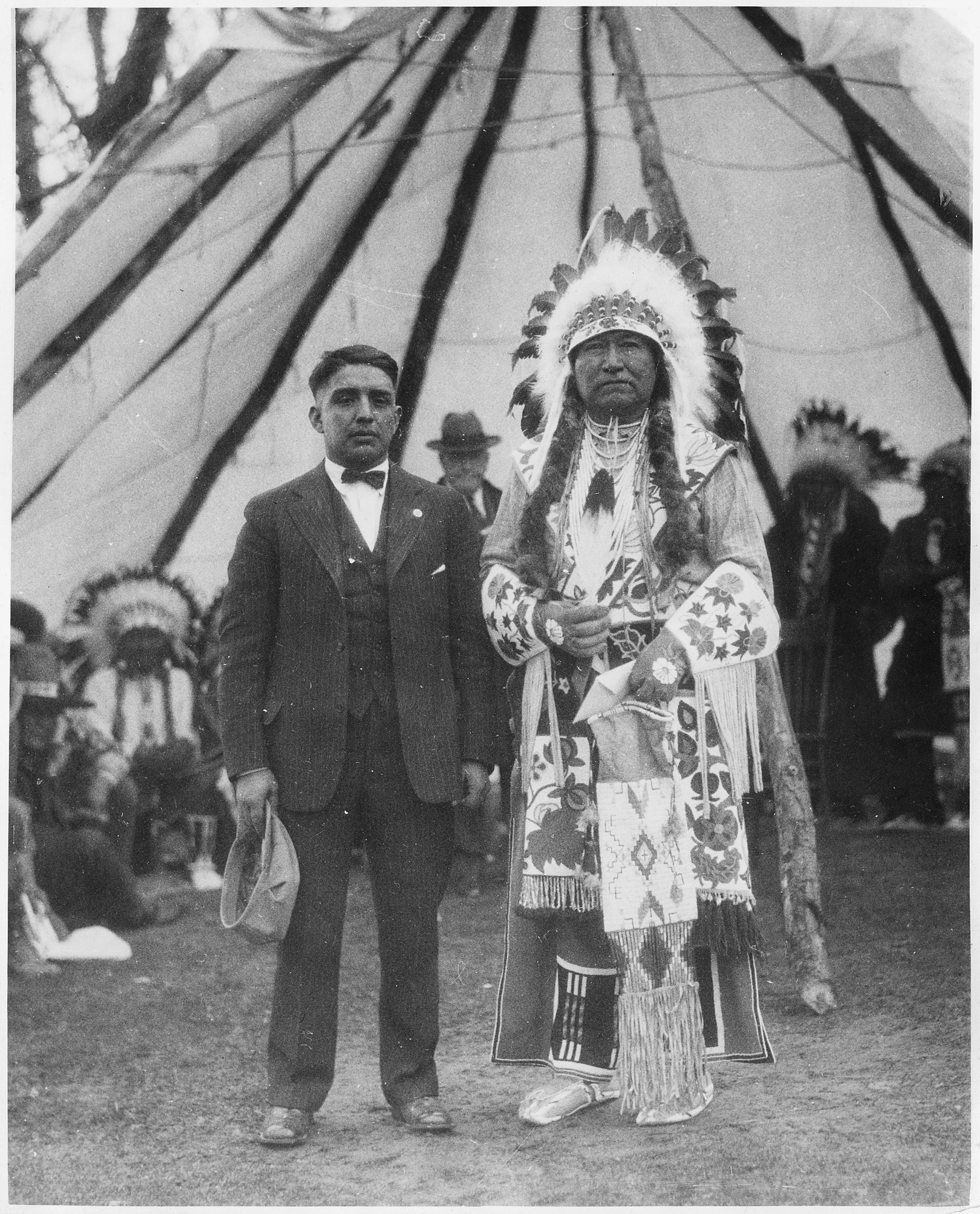
Interpreter George LaVatta and Chief Tendoi circa 1923 at the Fort Hall Reservation

Tendoy is an unincorporated community in Lemhi County, Idaho, United States, located at 44°57′34″N 113°38′41″W (44.9593700, -113.6447780) on State Highway 28, at an altitude of 4,842 feet (1,476 m). It was named for Tendoy, a prominent Lemhi Shoshone chief in the mid-19th century.

It is the nearest location to Lemhi Pass over the Bitterroot Range, where the Lewis and Clark Expedition first crossed the Continental Divide in 1805. Sacajawea, the Shoshoni woman who guided the Expedition, was born near Tendoy. Lemhi Pass is a National Historic Landmark.

The site of Fort Lemhi is two miles north of Tendoy.
