= Salmon, Idaho =

City in Lemhi County, Idaho, United States

- City
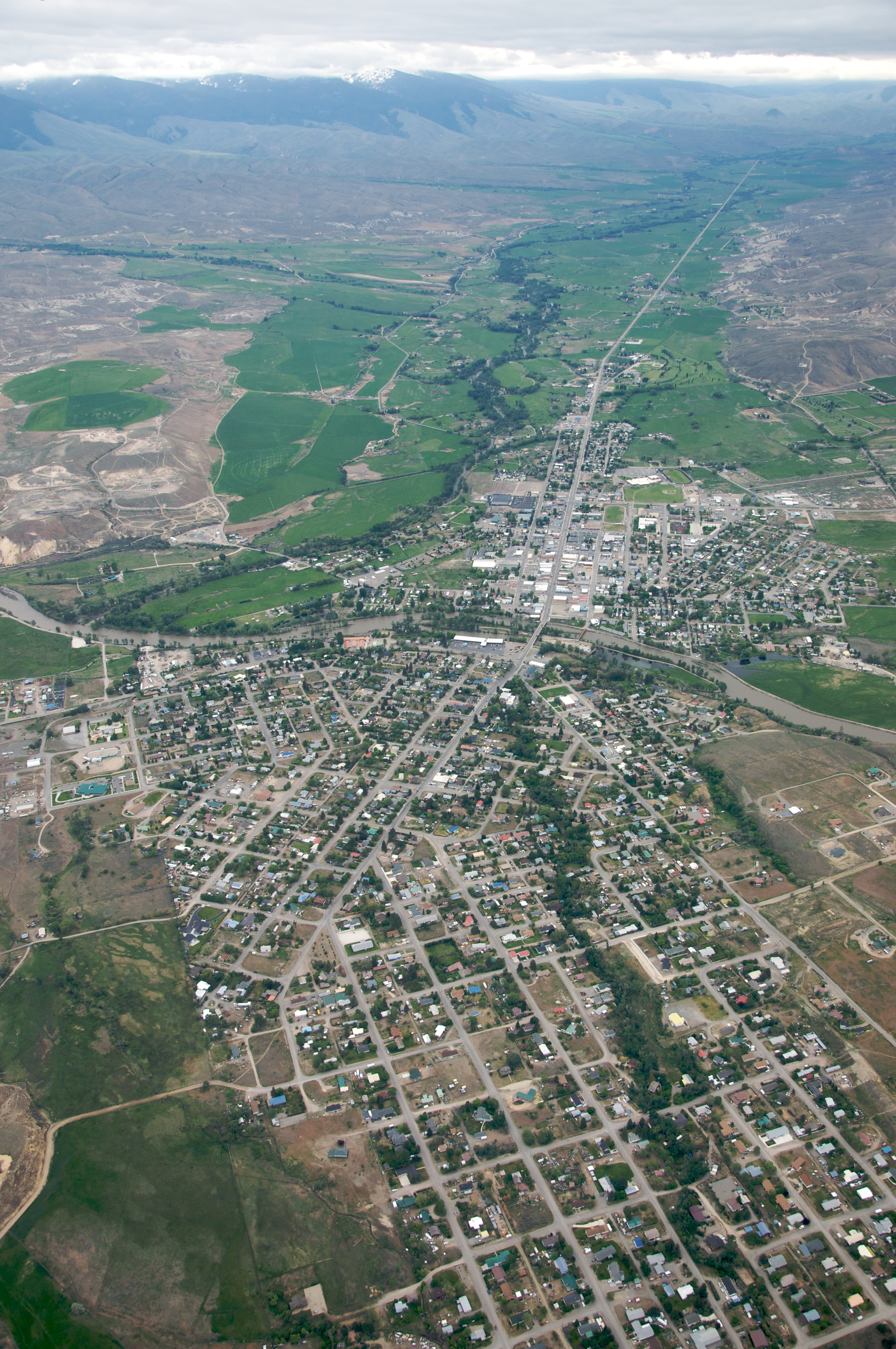
- Motto: "The Birthplace of Sacajawea"
- Location of Salmon in Lemhi County, Idaho.
- Coordinates: 45°10′12″N 113°52′50″W
- Country: United States
- State: Idaho
- County: Lemhi

Area
  - Total: 2.54 sq mi (6.59 km^{2})
  - Land: 2.51 sq mi (6.50 km^{2})
  - Water: 0.035 sq mi (0.09 km^{2})
- Elevation: 3,947 ft (1,203 m)

Population (2020)
  - Total: 3,119
  - Density: 1,226.1/sq mi (473.39/km^{2})
- Time zone: UTC-7 (Mountain (MST))
  - Summer (DST): UTC-6 (MDT)
- ZIP code: 83467
- Area code: 208
- FIPS code: 16-71650
- GNIS feature ID: 2411770
- Website: www.cityofsalmon.com

Salmon is a city in Lemhi County, Idaho. The population was 3,119 at the 2020 census. The city is the county seat of Lemhi County.

== History ==
The Lewis and Clark Expedition crossed the Continental Divide at Lemhi Pass, 30 miles (48 km) to the southeast of Salmon. They followed the Salmon River through the present site of the city, then ascended the north fork of the river, at the present-day town named after the confluence, to cross into present-day Montana near Lost Trail Pass. The sole female in the party, Sacagawea, was born in the Lemhi Valley near Salmon. The Sacajawea Interpretive, Cultural and Educational Center was opened in Salmon in August 2003.

From 1910 to 1939, Salmon was the western terminus of the now-defunct Gilmore and Pittsburgh Railroad.

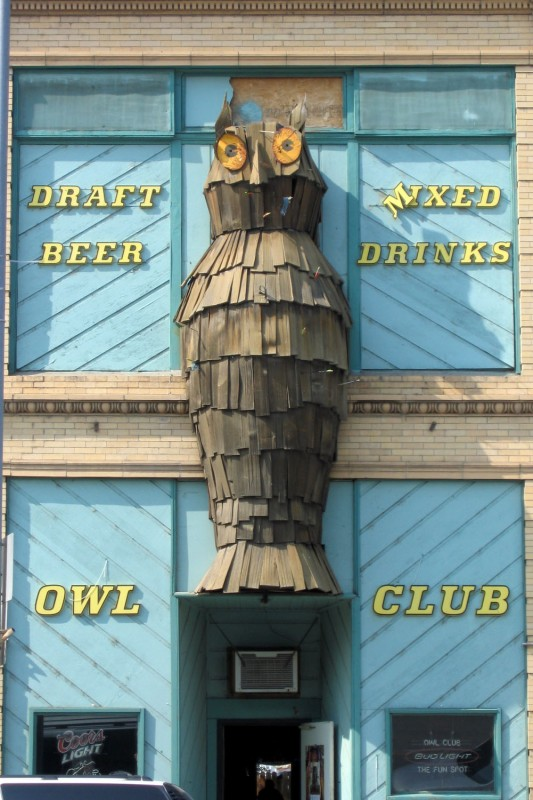
The Owl Club in downtown Salmon, Idaho.

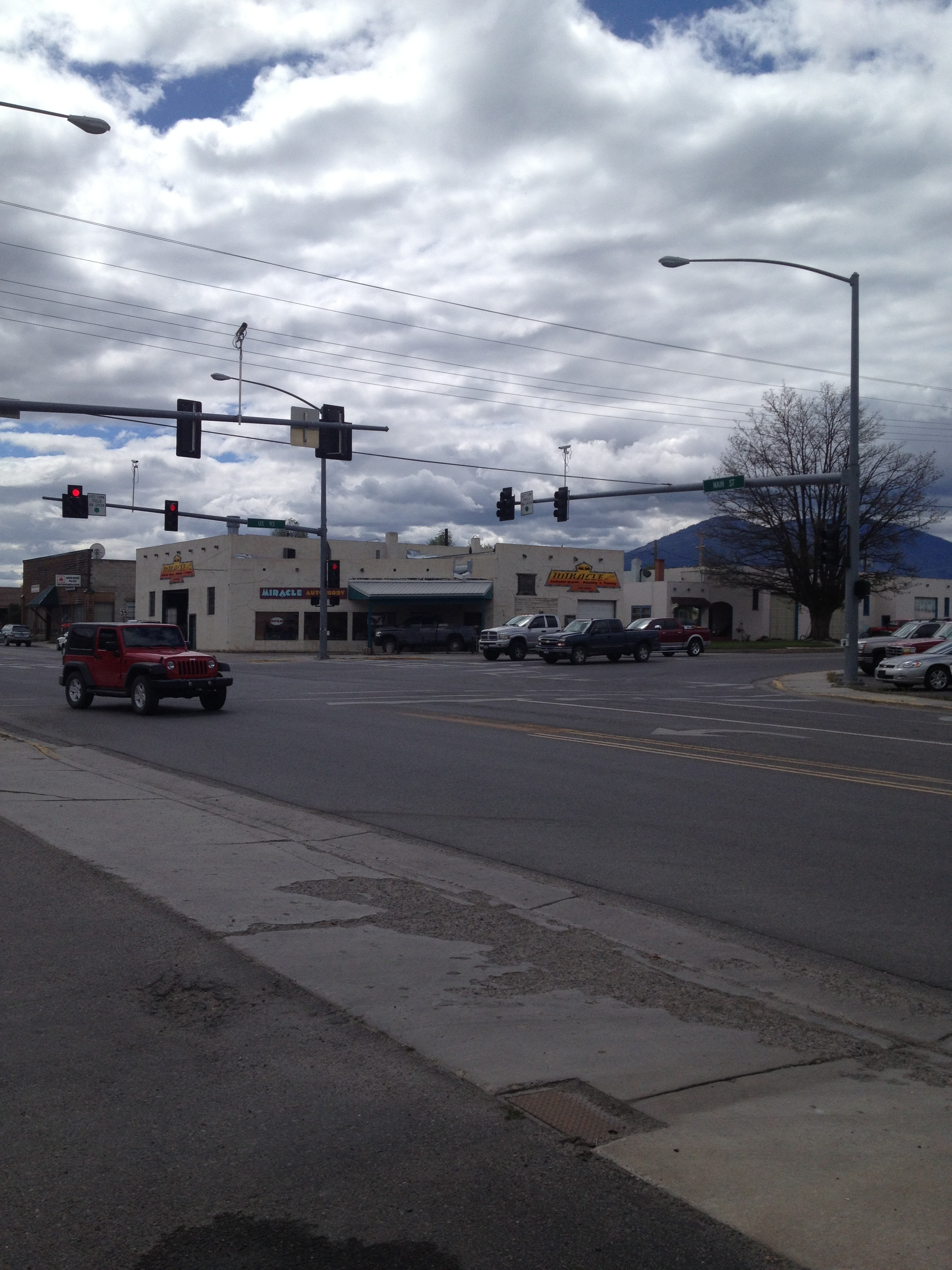
Intersection. Salmon, Idaho.

== Demographics ==
Historical population
Census	Pop.	Note	%±
1870	186		—
1880	292		57.0%
1900	398		—
1910	1,434		260.3%
1920	1,311		−8.6%
1930	1,371		4.6%
1940	2,439		77.9%
1950	2,648		8.6%
1960	2,944		11.2%
1970	2,910		−1.2%
1980	3,308		13.7%
1990	2,941		−11.1%
2000	3,122		6.2%
2010	3,112		−0.3%
2020	3,119		0.2%
U.S. Decennial Census

=== 2020 census ===
As of the 2020 census, Salmon had a population of 3,119. The population density was 1,226.02 inhabitants per square mile (473.4/km^{2}). There were 1,635 housing units at an average density of 642.7 units per square mile (248.1 units/km^{2}).

The median age was 45.9 years. 20.7% of residents were under the age of 18 and 26.2% of residents were 65 years of age or older. For every 100 females there were 93.5 males, and for every 100 females age 18 and over there were 89.8 males age 18 and over.

0.0% of residents lived in urban areas, while 100.0% lived in rural areas.

There were 1,467 households in Salmon, of which 21.9% had children under the age of 18 living in them. Of all households, 38.4% were married-couple households, 22.4% were households with a male householder and no spouse or partner present, and 32.9% were households with a female householder and no spouse or partner present. About 40.0% of all households were made up of individuals and 21.2% had someone living alone who was 65 years of age or older.

Of all housing units, 10.3% were vacant. The homeowner vacancy rate was 2.1% and the rental vacancy rate was 4.3%.

Racial composition as of the 2020 census
Race	Number	Percent
White	2,847	91.3%
Black or African American	11	0.4%
American Indian and Alaska Native	27	0.9%
Asian	20	0.6%
Native Hawaiian and Other Pacific Islander	2	0.1%
Some other race	49	1.6%
Two or more races	163	5.2%
Hispanic or Latino (of any race)	122	3.9%

=== Demographic estimates ===
Approximately, 98.9% of households speak English only, and 8.2% of residents are veterans. Of the population ages 25 and over, 90.0% were high school graduates or higher; 20.9% had earned a Bachelor's Degree or higher.

=== Income and poverty ===
The median household income was $45,130 and the median family income was $62,417. About 16.3% of the Salmon population were below the poverty line, including 15.7% of those under age 18 and 13.0% of those age 65 or over.

== Geography ==
According to the United States Census Bureau, the city has a total area of 2.544 square miles (6.59 km^{2}), of which, 2.509 square miles (6.50 km^{2}) is land and 0.035 square miles (0.09 km^{2}) is water.

The famous Salmon River passes through Salmon; whitewater rafting, fishing, hunting, and others interested in outdoor recreation bring additional tourism and economic activity to Salmon. The Lemhi River flows into the Salmon River near downtown Salmon.

=== Climate ===
Salmon experiences a semi-arid climate (Köppen BSk) with cold, dry winters and hot, slightly wetter summers. The hottest temperature recorded in Salmon was 106 °F (41.1 °C) on July 21, 1936, while the coldest temperature recorded was −37 °F (−38.3 °C) on January 23, 1930, and January 21, 1937.

Climate data for Salmon, Idaho, 1991–2020 normals, extremes 1905–present
Month	Jan	Feb	Mar	Apr	May	Jun	Jul	Aug	Sep	Oct	Nov	Dec	Year
Record high °F (°C)	62 (17)	68 (20)	77 (25)	89 (32)	96 (36)	103 (39)	106 (41)	103 (39)	99 (37)	87 (31)	78 (26)	62 (17)	106 (41)
Mean maximum °F (°C)	43.6 (6.4)	50.1 (10.1)	66.7 (19.3)	77.1 (25.1)	84.9 (29.4)	92.2 (33.4)	98.0 (36.7)	96.1 (35.6)	89.7 (32.1)	76.9 (24.9)	58.4 (14.7)	46.0 (7.8)	98.5 (36.9)
Mean daily maximum °F (°C)	28.2 (−2.1)	35.8 (2.1)	49.5 (9.7)	58.7 (14.8)	68.3 (20.2)	75.7 (24.3)	86.3 (30.2)	84.8 (29.3)	74.3 (23.5)	58.4 (14.7)	40.8 (4.9)	28.9 (−1.7)	57.5 (14.2)
Daily mean °F (°C)	19.6 (−6.9)	26.0 (−3.3)	37.5 (3.1)	45.2 (7.3)	54.0 (12.2)	61.0 (16.1)	69.0 (20.6)	66.7 (19.3)	57.4 (14.1)	44.6 (7.0)	31.2 (−0.4)	20.9 (−6.2)	44.4 (6.9)
Mean daily minimum °F (°C)	11.0 (−11.7)	16.3 (−8.7)	25.5 (−3.6)	31.6 (−0.2)	39.7 (4.3)	46.2 (7.9)	51.6 (10.9)	48.7 (9.3)	40.6 (4.8)	30.8 (−0.7)	21.6 (−5.8)	12.9 (−10.6)	31.4 (−0.3)
Mean minimum °F (°C)	−6.1 (−21.2)	−0.6 (−18.1)	14.5 (−9.7)	21.8 (−5.7)	28.1 (−2.2)	34.6 (1.4)	43.5 (6.4)	40.7 (4.8)	30.1 (−1.1)	18.2 (−7.7)	7.5 (−13.6)	−3.4 (−19.7)	−10.5 (−23.6)
Record low °F (°C)	−37 (−38)	−35 (−37)	−20 (−29)	2 (−17)	16 (−9)	20 (−7)	26 (−3)	22 (−6)	13 (−11)	−3 (−19)	−14 (−26)	−32 (−36)	−37 (−38)
Average precipitation inches (mm)	0.58 (15)	0.37 (9.4)	0.47 (12)	0.77 (20)	1.29 (33)	1.63 (41)	0.77 (20)	0.60 (15)	0.79 (20)	0.81 (21)	0.67 (17)	0.73 (19)	9.48 (242.4)
Average snowfall inches (cm)	6.7 (17)	3.8 (9.7)	1.2 (3.0)	0.4 (1.0)	0.1 (0.25)	0.0 (0.0)	0.0 (0.0)	0.0 (0.0)	0.0 (0.0)	0.1 (0.25)	3.3 (8.4)	6.4 (16)	22.0 (56)
Average precipitation days (≥ 0.01 in)	6.1	4.7	6.1	7.3	9.3	9.4	5.7	5.1	4.8	5.8	6.3	7.0	77.6
Average snowy days (≥ 0.1 in)	4.6	2.7	1.2	0.3	0.1	0.0	0.0	0.0	0.0	0.1	1.7	4.1	14.8
Source 1: NOAA
Source 2: National Weather Service

== Sports ==
While Salmon boasts a multitude of outdoor recreational and unorganized activities, the local community also has strong participation in youth sports programs:

- Salmon Hockey Association
- Salmon Soccer Association
- Lemhi Youth Baseball
- Lemhi Express Softball
- Little Savage Football

Most school-supported programs are provided in conjunction with Salmon Jr/Sr High School. Sports available at the high school age group are: wrestling, football, basketball, cross-country, track & field, baseball, softball, golf, volleyball, cheer, ice hockey, and rodeo.

== Points of Interest ==
- The Sacajawea Center, formally known as the Sacajawea Interpretive, Cultural & Educational Center, "interprets the rich cultural and natural history of the Salmon and Lemhi River Country, deepening people’s connection to the unique place this area holds in our nation’s history, which was shaped in part by the Lewis and Clark Expedition and Sacajawea, as well as her people, the Agai’dika Shoshone-Bannock Tribes." Located on 71 acres abutting the Lemhi River, the Sacajawea Center has a visitor center & gift shop, outdoor amphitheater, community gardens, miles of outdoor trails, a research library, and an enclosed dog park.
- Salmon Hockey Rink is a seasonal, outdoor ice hockey rink. Known for its mountainous views including the Continental Divide, the Salmon Hockey Rink hosts multiple tournaments that provide a strong tourism injection into Salmon during the winter weekends. Competitive teams, youth teams, and even recreational adult teams hit the ice in Salmon.
- Nep & Mary Ellen Lynch Center, known locally as The Lynch Center, opened in May 2021. This $5 million facility, located at Salmon High School, is "used for all sporting events, including basketball games, volleyball games and wrestling matches. It contains an auxiliary gym, a weight room, and a cardio room for athletes to train in, and it will have a film room that will be used to review game film. The building is also available through the Salmon School District for use." Local pickleball players and adult soccer players use the auxiliary gym as well.
- Salmon Valley Golf Course is a 9-hole, Par 3 golf course located in Salmon's large City Park. Maintained by the Salmon City Golf Association, the Salmon Valley Golf Course was designed by Carl Thuesen and built in 1986. The course is usually open from March to October.

The City of Salmon maintains five public parks with distinct activities and functions:

- Kid's Creek Park
- Salmon City Park
- Island Park
- Veterans Memorial Park
- Skate Park

== Education ==
Salmon School District had 646 students enrolled in grades K-12 during Spring 2023. Of which, 383 students were enrolled at Salmon Jr/Sr High School and 263 students were enrolled at Salmon Pioneer Elementary School. Low student-teacher ratios are the norm with ratios of 16.9:1 at Salmon High School and 13.7:1 at Pioneer Elementary School during the 2022-23 school year. A typical school week only has four days of classes, Mondays-Thursdays. Salmon School District #291 operates:

- Salmon Pioneer Elementary School (grades K-5)
- Salmon Junior/Senior High School (grades 6-12)
- Salmon Alternative School (grades 7-12)
- Salmon Juvenile Detention Center

Salmon School District is planning a realignment for students in grades 6-8. After years of work by the Salmon School Needs Assessment Committee, district residents passed a municipal school bond in May 2024 for $20 million to construct a new K-8 facility, which will replace Salmon Pioneer Elementary School. The bond passed with 71.5% of the vote and will cover a majority of the project cost, which is estimated to be $29 million total including donations. The new K-8 school is anticipated to be open during the 2026-2027 school year.

Salmon is also home to Fernwaters Public Charter School, which provides Kindergarten through 8th grade public education. Fernwaters Charter School had an enrollment of 74 students in grades 4-8 during Spring 2023. Fernwaters Charter School had a student-teacher ratio of 13.3:1 during the 2022-23 school year. Fernwaters Charter School is in the process of constructing a new, permanent facility through the use of private donations, remaining Elementary and Secondary School Emergency Relief (ESSER) funds, and capital reserves. The project is estimated at $3.6 million and is scheduled to be open in Fall 2026.

Salmon Seventh-day Adventist Elementary School is Salmon's only private school between grades K-12. Salmon SDA Elementary provides private education to students in grades 1-8 and boasts a student-teacher ratio of 11:1.

== Media ==
=== Radio ===
KSRA (AM) 960 and KSRA-FM 92.7 are both licensed in Salmon and initially On Air in 1959 and 1979, respectively. Both stations were purchased in January 2019 by Bitterroot Communications from Salmon River Communications. In July 2024, James and Sharon Infanger purchased both KSRA stations.

=== Newspaper ===
The Recorder Herald is a weekly newspaper published on Thursdays. Founded in 1886 as The Idaho Recorder, the newspaper later amalgamated with The Salmon Herald (1914-1926) and emerged in 1927 with the current namesake. The Recorder Herald provides local news, opinion, and coverage for events in Salmon, Lemhi County, and the surrounding region.

== Notable people ==
- J. D. Cannon, American actor, born in Salmon in 1922
- J.D. Folsom, former NFL linebacker, Miami Dolphins
- Elmer Keith, creator of the .357 magnum, .44 magnum and .41 magnum revolver cartridges
- Dick Randolph, the first Libertarian elected to a U.S. state legislature; born in Salmon in 1936
- Sacagawea (also spelled Sakakawea or Sacajawea) (May 1788 – December 20, 1812)

== See also ==
- List of cities in Idaho
- Lemhi County, Idaho
