= Sacajawea Peak =

Sacajawea Peak or Sacagawea Peak or Mount Sacagawea may refer to:

- Sacajawea Peak (Oregon)
- Sacajawea Peak (Lost River Range, Idaho)
- Sacagawea Peak (Bridger Range, Montana)
- Sacajawea Peaks (Idaho and Montana)
- Sacajawea Peak in the list of mountains in Sanders County, Montana
- Mount Sacagawea (Wyoming)
