= Sacagawea =

Native American explorer (c.1788 – 1812)

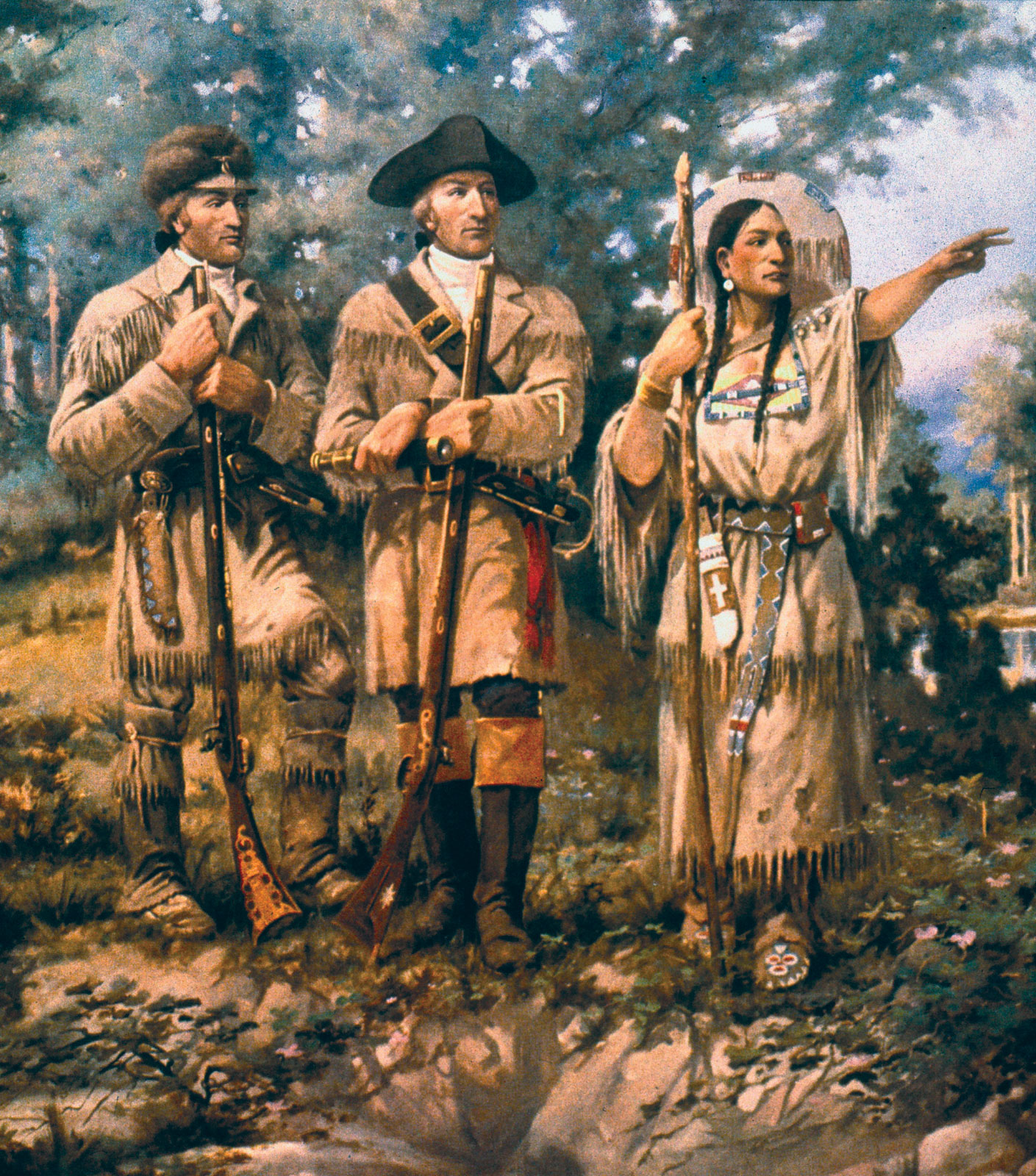
- Sacagawea (right) with Lewis and Clark at the Three Forks, mural at Montana House of Representatives
- Born: May 1788; Lemhi River Valley, near present-day Salmon, Idaho, US
- Died: December 20, 1812 (aged 24); Kenel, South Dakota, or Wyoming
- Other names: Sakakawea, Sacajawea
- Known for: Accompanied the Lewis and Clark Expedition
- Spouse: Toussaint Charbonneau
- Children: At least 2, including Jean Baptiste Charbonneau

Sacagawea (/ˌsækədʒəˈwiːə/ SAK-ə-jə-WEE-ə or /səˌkɑːɡəˈweɪə/ sə-KAH-gə-WAY-ə; also spelled Sakakawea or Sacajawea; c. May 1788 – December 20, 1812) was a Lemhi Shoshone or Hidatsa woman who, in her teens, helped the Lewis and Clark Expedition in achieving their chartered mission objectives by exploring the Louisiana Territory. Sacagawea traveled with the expedition thousands of miles from North Dakota to the Pacific Ocean, helping to establish cultural contacts with Native American people and contributing to the expedition's knowledge of natural history in different regions.

The National American Woman Suffrage Association of the early 20th century adopted Sacagawea as a symbol of women's worth and independence, erecting several statues and plaques in her memory, and doing much to recount her accomplishments.

== Early life ==
Reliable historical information about Sacagawea is very limited.

According to Toussaint Charbonneau, her husband, she was born c. 1788 into the Agaidika ('Salmon Eater', aka Lemhi Shoshone) tribe near present-day Salmon, Idaho. This is near the continental divide at the present-day Idaho-Montana border. In 1800, when she was about 12 years old, Sacagawea and several other children were taken captive by a group of Hidatsa in a raid that resulted in the deaths of several Shoshone: four men, four women, and several boys. She was held captive at a Hidatsa village near present-day Washburn, North Dakota. She disclosed to Lewis and other expedition members that four Shoshone men and some boys were killed in the battle, and she was taken captive with other women and boys. Her captors were "Gos Vauntos Indians," which some historians attribute to the Hidatsa.

According to an alternative theory presented in the Sacagawea Project Board's 2021 book Our Story of Eagle Woman, Sacagawea was born as a member of the Hidatsa tribe, and was possibly abducted by the Shoshone (rather than the reverse, as in Charbonneau's telling) before returning to her tribe. The authors cite a 1923 oral history told by a man who claimed to be her grandson, Bulls Eye, that was supported by contemporary elders in the tribe. The Sacagawea Project Board conducted DNA testing that they say shows a genetic link between Hidatsa descended from Cedar Woman, who was said to be Sacagawea's daughter (born after her supposed death in 1812), and French Canadians with the name Charbonneau.

At about age 13, she was granted into what was then a Native American custom at the time, a non-consensual marriage to Charbonneau, a Quebecois trapper. He had also been associated with another young Shoshone girl, known as Otter Woman, for a wife. Charbonneau was variously reported to have purchased both girls from the Hidatsa, or to have won Sacagawea while gambling.

== Lewis and Clark Expedition ==
In 1804, the Corps of Discovery reached a Mandan village, where Captains Meriwether Lewis and William Clark built Fort Mandan for wintering over in 1804–05. They interviewed several trappers who might be able to interpret or guide the expedition up the Missouri River in the springtime. Knowing they would need to communicate with the tribal nations who lived at the headwaters of the Missouri River, they agreed to hire Toussaint Charbonneau in early winter of 1804, who claimed to speak several Native languages, and one of his wives, who spoke Shoshone. Sacagawea was pregnant with her first child at the time.

On November 4, 1804, Clark recorded in his journal: (Note: Journal entries by Clark, Lewis, et al., are brief segments of "our nation's 'living history' legacy of documented exploration across our fledgling republic's pristine western frontier. It is a story written in inspired spelling and with an urgent sense of purpose by ordinary people who accomplished extraordinary deeds.")

[A] french man by Name Chabonah, who Speaks the Big Belley language visit us, he wished to hire & informed us his 2 Squars (squaws) were Snake Indians, we engau (engaged) him to go on with us and take one of his wives to interpret the Snake language.

Charbonneau and Sacagawea moved into the expedition's fort a week later. Clark later nicknamed her "Janey." (Note: William Clark created the nickname "Janey" for Sacagawea, which he transcribed twice, November 24, 1805, in his journal, and in a letter to Toussaint, August 20, 1806. It is thought that Clark's use of "Janey" derived from "jane," colloquial army slang for "girl.") Lewis observed her activities as part of his ethnographic report on Native people. She and her family traveled mostly in the co-captains' company, ate near or with them, and shared the same tent. Lewis recorded the birth of Jean Baptiste Charbonneau on February 11, 1805, noting that another of the party's interpreters administered crushed rattlesnake rattles in water to speed the delivery, which helped with the painful delivery. Clark and other members of the Corps nicknamed the boy "Pomp" or "Pompy."

In April 1805, the expedition left Fort Mandan and headed up the Missouri River in pirogues and Sacagawea carried young Jean Baptiste on her back in an Indian cradleboard. While heading up the Missouri River, they had to be poled against the current and sometimes pulled by crew along the riverbanks. On May 14, 1805, Sacagawea rescued items that had fallen out of a capsized boat, including the journals and records of Lewis and Clark. The corps commanders, who praised her quick action, named the Sacagawea River in her honor on May 20, 1805. By August 1805, the corps had located a Shoshone tribe and was attempting to trade for horses to cross the Rocky Mountains. They used Sacagawea to interpret and discovered that the tribe's leader, Cameahwait, was her brother, though in the Shoshoni language cousin and brother are the same word.

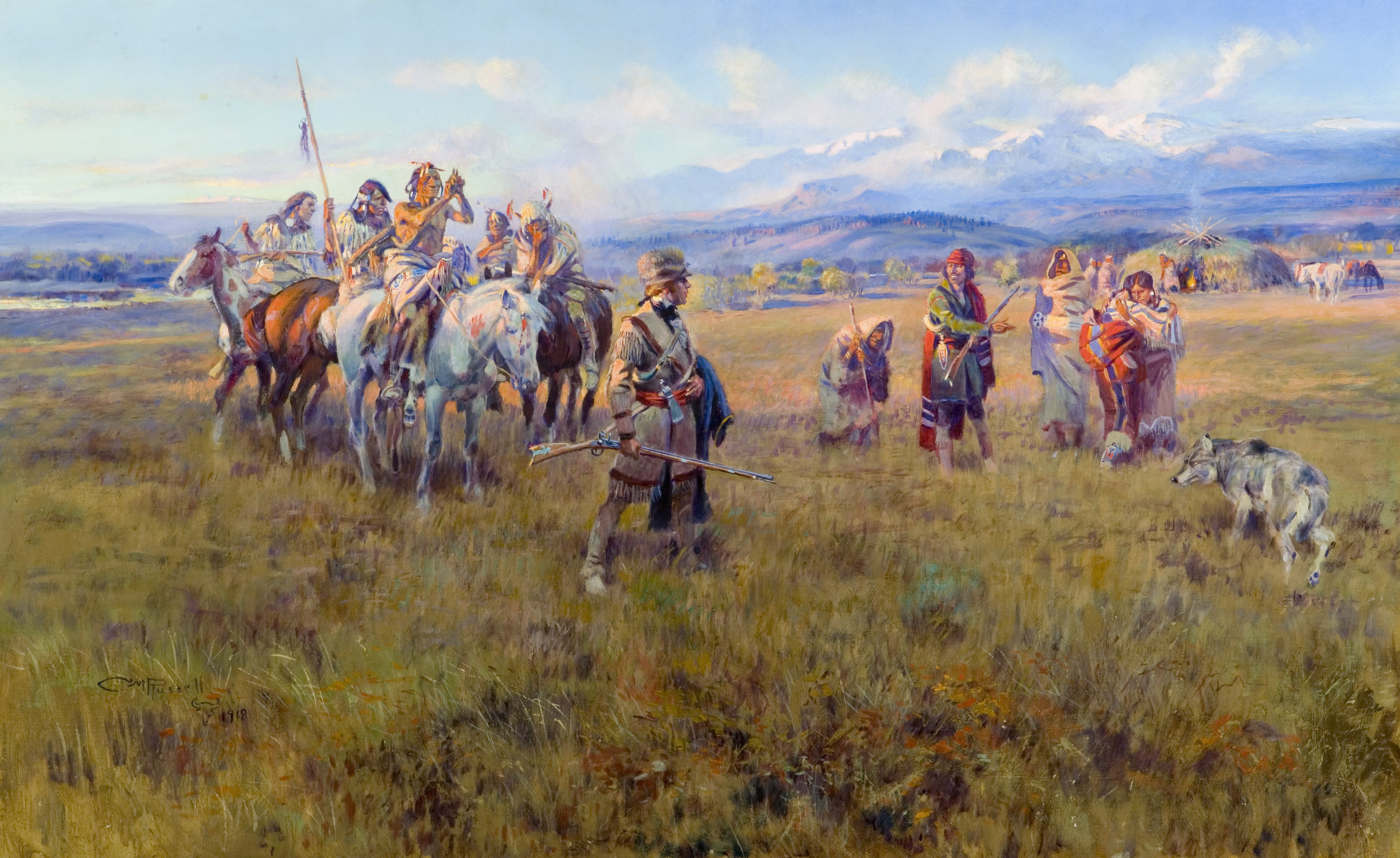
Lewis and Clark Expedition (1918) by Charles Marion Russell. Lewis and Clark reach the Shoshone camp led by Sacagawea.

Lewis recorded their reunion in his journal:

Shortly after Capt. Clark arrived with the Interpreter Charbono, and the Indian woman, who proved to be a sister of the Chief Cameahwait. The meeting of those people was really affecting, particularly between Sah cah-gar-we-ah and an Indian woman, who had been taken prisoner at the same time with her, and who had afterwards escaped from the Minnetares and rejoined her nation.

And Clark in his:

The Intertrepeter [sic] & Squar who were before me at Some distance danced for the joyful Sight, and She made signs to me that they were her nation ...

The Shoshone agreed to barter horses and to provide guides to lead the expedition over the Rocky Mountains. The mountain crossing took longer than expected, and the expedition's food supplies dwindled. When they descended into more temperate regions, Sacagawea helped to find and cook camas roots to help the party members regain their strength.

As the expedition approached the mouth of the Columbia River on the Pacific Coast, Sacagawea gave up her beaded belt to enable the captains to trade for a fur robe they wished to bring back to give to President Thomas Jefferson.

Clark's journal entry for November 20, 1805, reads:

one of the Indians had on a roab made of 2 Sea Otter Skins the fur of them were more butifull than any fur I had ever Seen both Capt. Lewis & my Self endeavored to purchase the roab with different articles at length we precured it for a belt of blue beeds which the Squar—wife of our interpreter Shabono wore around her waste. [sic]

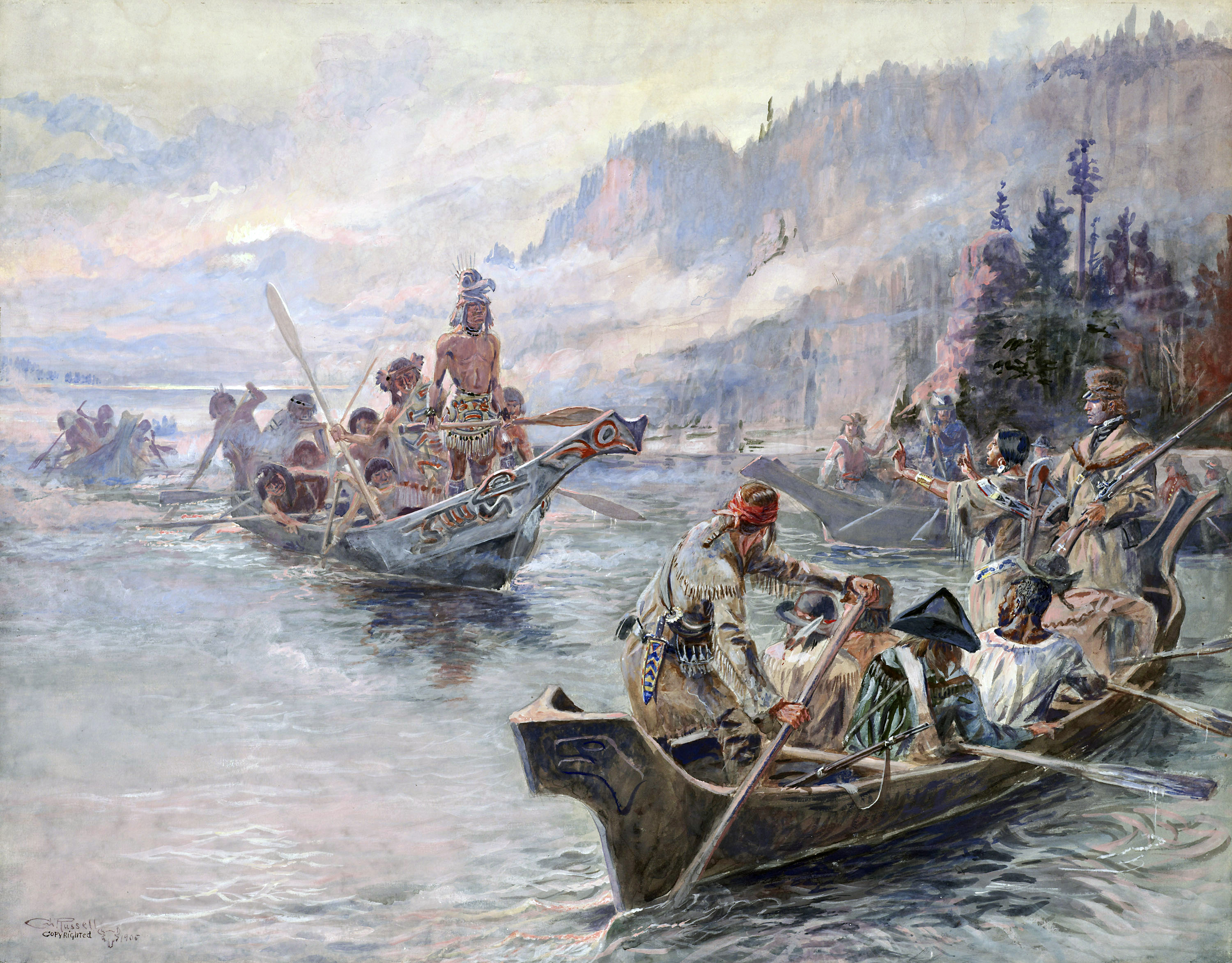
Lewis and Clark on the Lower Columbia by Charles Marion Russell. A painting of the Expedition depicting Sacagawea with arms outstretched

When the corps reached the Pacific Ocean, all members of the expedition—including Sacagawea and Clark's enslaved servant York—voted on November 24 on the location for building their winter fort. In January, when a whale's carcass washed up onto the beach south of Fort Clatsop, Sacagawea insisted on her right to go see this "monstrous fish."

On the return trip, they approached the Rocky Mountains in July 1806. On July 6, Clark recorded:

The Indian woman informed me that she had been in this plain frequently and knew it well. ... She said we would discover a gap in the mountains in our direction [i.e., present-day Gibbons Pass].

A week later, on July 13, 1806 Sacagawea advised Clark to cross into the Yellowstone River basin at what is now known as Bozeman Pass. Later, this was chosen as the optimal route for the Northern Pacific Railway to cross the continental divide:

"The Indian woman who has been of great service to me as a pilot through this Country recommends a gap in the mountain[s] more South which I shall cross."

While Sacagawea has been depicted as a guide for the expedition, she is recorded as providing direction in only a few instances, primarily in present-day Montana. Her work as a guide revolved around her geographical insight and as an interpreter. Her work as an interpreter helped the party to negotiate with the Shoshone. But, she also had significant value to the mission simply by her presence on the journey, as having a woman and infant accompany them demonstrated the peaceful intent of the expedition. While traveling through what is now Franklin County, Washington, in October 1805, Clark noted that "the wife of Shabono [Charbonneau] our interpreter, we find reconciles all the Indians, as to our friendly intentions a woman with a party of men is a token of peace." Further he wrote that she "confirmed those people of our friendly intentions, as no woman ever accompanies a war party of Indians in this quarter" [sic].

As Clark traveled downriver from Fort Mandan at the end of the journey, on board the pirogue near the Ricara Village, he wrote to Charbonneau:

You have been a long time with me and conducted your Self in Such a manner as to gain my friendship, your woman who accompanied you that long dangerous and fatigueing rout to the Pacific Ocian and back diserved a greater reward for her attention and services on that rout than we had in our power to give her at the Mandans. As to your little Son (my boy Pomp) you well know my fondness of him and my anxiety to take him and raise him as my own child. ... If you are desposed to accept either of my offers to you and will bring down you Son your famn [femme, woman] Janey had best come along with you to take care of the boy untill I get him. ... Wishing you and your family great success & with anxious expectations of seeing my little danceing boy Baptiest I shall remain your Friend, William Clark. [sic]

— Clark to Charbonneau, August 20, 1806

Sacagawea was mentioned 108 times in the combined Lewis and Clark journals, often in passing as "the wife of our interpreter," "our squaw," or "the Snake woman."

== Later life and death ==
=== Children ===
Following the expedition, Charbonneau and Sacagawea spent three years among the Hidatsa before accepting William Clark's invitation to settle in St. Louis, Missouri, in 1809. They entrusted Jean-Baptiste's education to Clark, who enrolled the young man in the Saint Louis Academy boarding school. Sacagawea gave birth to a daughter, Lizette Charbonneau, about 1812. Lizette was identified as a year-old girl in adoption papers in 1813 recognizing William Clark, who also adopted her older brother that year. Because Clark's papers make no later mention of Lizette, it is believed that she died in childhood.

=== Death ===
According to Bonnie "Spirit Wind-Walker" Butterfield, historical documents suggest that Sacagawea died in 1812 of an unknown sickness. For instance, a journal entry from 1811 by Henry Brackenridge, a fur trader at Fort Lisa Trading Post on the Missouri River, wrote that Sacagawea and Charbonneau were living at the fort. Brackenridge recorded that Sacagawea "had become sickly and longed to revisit her native country." John Luttig, a Fort Lisa clerk, recorded in his journal on December 20, 1812, that "the wife of Charbonneau, a Snake Squaw [i.e. Shoshone], died of putrid fever." He said that she was "aged about 25 years. She left a fine infant girl." Documents held by Clark show that Charbonneau had already entrusted their son Baptiste to Clark's care for a boarding school education, at Clark's insistence.

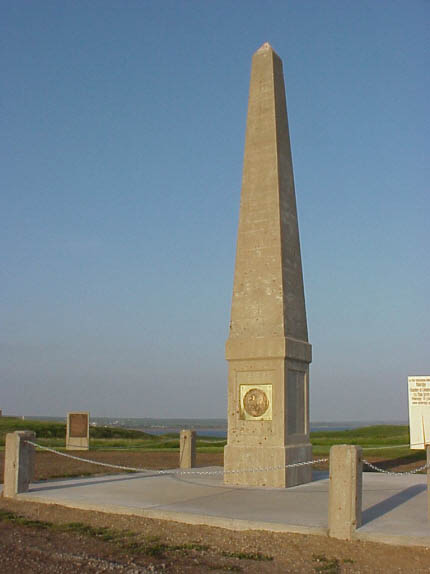
Sakakawea obelisk at the believed site of her death, Mobridge, South Dakota, 2003

In February 1813, a few months after Luttig's journal entry, 15 men were killed in a Native attack on Fort Lisa, which was then located at the mouth of the Bighorn River. John Luttig, as well as Sacagawea's infant daughter, were among the survivors. Charbonneau was mistakenly thought to have been killed at this time, but he apparently lived to at least age 76. He had signed over formal custody of his son to William Clark in 1813.

As further proof that Sacagawea died in 1812, Butterfield writes:

An adoption document made in the Orphans Court Records in St. Louis, Missouri, states, 'On August 11, 1813, William Clark became the guardian of Tousant Charbonneau, a boy about ten years, and Lizette Charbonneau, a girl about one year old.' For a Missouri State Court at the time, to designate a child as orphaned and to allow an adoption, both parents had to be confirmed dead in court papers.

The last recorded document referring to Sacagawea's life appears in William Clark's original notes written between 1825 and 1826. He lists the names of each of the expedition members and their last known whereabouts. For Sacagawea, he writes, "Se car ja we au— Dead."

==== Documentary evidence and scholarly debate ====
While the 1812 death date has been widely accepted by historians, recent scholarship has identified significant problems with the documentary evidence. The Sacagawea Project Board's 2021 book Our Story of Eagle Woman presents several challenges to the traditional narrative:

- Translation problems: Toussaint Charbonneau, the primary source for information about Sacagawea, had poor command of both Hidatsa and English. Communication required a complex chain of translation that, according to a contemporary trader, went "from the Natives to the woman, from the woman to the husband, from the husband to the mulatto" (René Jusseaume), and finally to the captains.
- Clark's "cash book" reliability: The document that supposedly settled the question of Sacagawea's death contains a significant error. Clark listed Patrick Gass as "Dead" in the same document, but Gass outlived Clark by more than 30 years, living until 1870.
- Identification issues: Neither Henry Brackenridge (1811) nor John Luttig (1812) identified the woman who died at Fort Manuel Lisa by name, referring to her only as Charbonneau's wife or "a Snake squaw".

Historian Thomas Powers, reviewing the evidence presented in Our Story of Eagle Woman, wrote that "One way or another, every future history" of Sacagawea "will have to take it into account."

==== Jean Baptiste Charbonneau ====
Sacagawea's son, Jean Baptiste Charbonneau, had an adventurous life. Known as the infant who, with his mother, accompanied the explorers to the Pacific Ocean and back, he had lifelong celebrity status. At the age of 18, he was befriended by a German Prince, Duke Paul Wilhelm of Württemberg, who took him to Europe. There, Jean Baptiste lived for six years among royalty, while learning four languages and allegedly fathering a child in Germany named Anton Fries.

After his infant son died, Jean Baptiste returned from Europe in 1829 to the United States. He lived after that as a Western frontiersman. In 1846, he was a guide for the Mormon Battalion during construction of the first wagon road to South California. While in California, he was appointed as a magistrate for the Mission San Luis Rey. He disliked the way Indians were treated in the missions and left to become a hotel clerk in Auburn, California, once the center of gold rush activity.

After working six years in Auburn, Jean Baptiste left in search of riches in the gold mines of Montana. He was 61 years old, and the trip was too much for him. He became ill with pneumonia and died in a remote area near Danner, Oregon, on May 16, 1866.

=== Burial place ===
The question of Sacagawea's burial place caught the attention of national suffragists seeking voting rights for women, according to author Raymond Wilson. Wilson argues that Sacagawea became a role model whom suffragists pointed to "with pride". She received even more attention in the 1930s, after publication of a history novel about her.

Wilson notes:

Interest in Sacajawea peaked and controversy intensified when Dr. Grace Raymond Hebard, professor of political economy at the University of Wyoming in Laramie and an active supporter of the Nineteenth Amendment, campaigned for federal legislation to erect an edifice honoring Sacajawea's alleged death in 1884.

=== Alternative oral traditions and contested legacy ===
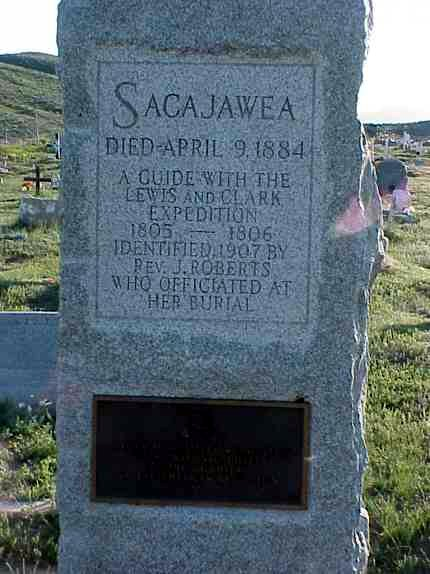
Marker of Sacajawea's assumed grave, Fort Washakie, Wyoming

An account of the expedition published in May 1919 noted that "A sculptor, Mr. Bruno Zimm, seeking a model for a statue of Sacagawea that was later erected at the Louisiana Purchase Exposition in St. Louis, discovered a record of the pilot-woman's death in 1884 (when ninety-five years old) on the Shoshone Reservation, Wyoming, and her wind-swept grave."

==== Hidatsa oral tradition ====
The Hidatsa people maintain a detailed oral tradition that Sacagawea was a member of their tribe who lived until 1869. This narrative was formally documented on Memorial Day 1923, when Bulls Eye, who claimed to be Sacagawea's grandson, gave testimony to Major A.B. Welch at Dead Grass Hall in Shell Creek Village on the Fort Berthold reservation. A group of tribal elders attended as witnesses to verify his account.

According to Bulls Eye's testimony:

- Sacagawea was not Shoshone but Hidatsa, the daughter of Smoked Lodge and Otter Woman (a Crow woman)
- After the Lewis and Clark expedition, she had three daughters: Cedar Woman, Different Breast, and Otter Woman (Bulls Eye's mother)
- She lived among the Hidatsa until 1869, when she died at age 82 from gunshot wounds sustained during a Sioux raid
- Bulls Eye, then about 4 years old, was present when she died

Bulls Eye stated: "We have heard about some white men who wrote about my grandmother. These white men came along here about a hundred years ago. They made a mistake... We have heard that they wrote it that she was not a Hidatsa, that she was a Shoshoni prisoner among us. But she was not a Shoshoni. She was Hidatsa."

DNA testing conducted in the 21st century showed that individuals claiming descent from Sacagawea through Cedar Woman matched 74 different Charbonneaus in commercial DNA registries. Charbonneau DNA was found only in family branches that oral tradition indicated descended from Sacagawea and Toussaint Charbonneau.

Additional documentary evidence supporting the Hidatsa account includes:

- A U.S. government "individual history card" from Fort Berthold listing Eagle Woman as Bulls Eye's grandmother
- Jean Baptiste Charbonneau's 1866 obituary describing his mother as "a half breed of the Crow tribe"
- An unpublished diary calling Jean Baptiste "half Crow Indian" with no mention of Shoshone ancestry

==== Shoshone tradition ====
In 1925, Dr. Charles Eastman, a Dakota Sioux physician, was hired by the Bureau of Indian Affairs to locate Sacagawea's remains. Eastman visited various Native American tribes to interview elders who might have known or heard of Sacagawea. He learned of a Shoshone woman at the Wind River Reservation with the Comanche name Porivo ('chief woman'). Some of those he interviewed said that she spoke of a long journey wherein she had helped white men, and that she had a silver Jefferson peace medal of the type carried by the Lewis and Clark Expedition. He found a Comanche woman named Tacutine who said that Porivo was her grandmother. According to Tacutine, Porivo had married into a Comanche tribe and had a number of children, including Tacutine's father, Ticannaf. Porivo left the tribe after her husband, Jerk-Meat, was killed.

According to these narratives, Porivo lived for some time at Fort Bridger in Wyoming with her sons Bazil and Baptiste, who each knew several languages, including English and French. Eventually, she returned to the Lemhi Shoshone at the Wind River Reservation, where she was recorded as "Bazil's mother." This woman, Porivo, is believed to have died on April 9, 1884. She was present for the negotiations for the 1868 treaty that created the Wind River Reservation and later helped her people transition to reservation life.

Eastman concluded that Porivo was Sacagawea. In 1963, a monument to "Sacajawea of the Shoshonis" was erected at Fort Washakie on the Wind River Reservation near Lander, Wyoming, on the basis of this claim.

The belief that Sacagawea lived to old age and died in Wyoming was widely disseminated in the United States through Sacajawea (1933), a biography written by Grace Raymond Hebard, based on her 30 years of research.

Mickelson recounts the findings of Thomas H. Johnson, who argues in his Also Called Sacajawea: Chief Woman's Stolen Identity (2007) that Hebard identified the wrong woman when she relied upon oral history that an old woman who died and is buried on the Wyoming Wind River Reservation was Sacajawea. Critics have also questioned Hebard's work because she portrayed Sacajawea in a manner described as "undeniably long on romance and short on hard evidence, suffering from a sentimentalization of Indian culture."

== Name ==
The name is a compound of two common Hidatsa nouns: cagáàga ([tsakáàka], 'bird') and míà ([míà], 'woman'). The compound is written as Cagáàgawia ('Bird Woman') in modern Hidatsa orthography, and pronounced [tsakáàkawia] (/m/ is pronounced [w] between vowels in Hidatsa). The double /aa/ in the name indicates a long vowel, while the diacritics suggest a falling pitch pattern.

Hidatsa is a pitch-accent language that does not have stress; therefore, in the Hidatsa pronunciation all syllables in [tsaɡáàɡawia] are pronounced with roughly the same relative emphasis. However, most English speakers perceive the accented syllable (the long /aa/) as stressed. In faithful rendering of Cagáàgawia to other languages, it is advisable to emphasize the second, long syllable, rather than the /i/ syllable, as is common in English.

The name has several spelling traditions in English. The origin of each tradition is described in the following sections.

=== Sacajawea ===
The spelling Sacajawea (/ˌsækədʒəˈwiːə/) is said to have derived from Shoshone Saca-tzaw-meah, meaning 'boat puller' or 'boat launcher'. In contrast to the Hidatsa etymology more popular among academics, Sacajawea is the preferred spelling used by her own tribe, the Lemhi Shoshone people, some of whom claim that her Hidatsa captors transliterated her Shoshone name in their own language and pronounced it according to their own dialect. That is, they heard a name that approximated tsakaka and wia, and interpreted it as 'bird woman', substituting their hard "g/k" pronunciation for the softer "tz/j" sound that did not exist in the Hidatsa language.

The use of this spelling almost certainly originated with Nicholas Biddle, who used the "j" when he annotated the journals of the Lewis and Clark Expedition for publication in 1814. This use became more widespread with the publication in 1902 of Eva Emery Dye's novel The Conquest: The True Story of Lewis and Clark. It is likely that Dye used Biddle's secondary source for the spelling, and her highly popular book made this version ubiquitous throughout the United States (previously most non-scholars had never even heard of Sacagawea).

Rozina George, great-great-great-great-granddaughter of Cameahwait, says the Agaidika tribe of Lemhi Shoshone do not recognize the spelling or pronunciation Sacagawea. Schools named in the interpreter's honor and other memorials erected in the area surrounding her birthplace use the spelling Sacajawea:

The Lemhi Shoshone call her Sacajawea. It is derived from the Shoshone word for her name, Saca tzah we yaa. In his Cash Book, William Clark spells Sacajawea with a "J". Also, William Clark and Private George Shannon explained to Nicholas Biddle (Published the first Lewis and Clark Journals in 1814) about the pronunciation of her name and how the tz sounds more like a "j". What better authority on the pronunciation of her name than Clark and Shannon who traveled with her and constantly heard the pronunciation of her name? We do not believe it is a Minnetaree (Hidatsa) word for her name. Sacajawea was a Lemhi Shoshone not a Hidatsa.

The Lemhi Shoshone translate her name to mean "a burden" or "one who carries a hevy burden." Idaho native John Rees explored the 'boat launcher' etymology in a long letter to the U.S. Commissioner of Indian Affairs written in the 1920s. It was republished in 1970 by the Lemhi County Historical Society as a pamphlet entitled "Madame Charbonneau" and contains many of the arguments in favor of the Shoshone derivation of the name.

The spelling Sacajawea, although widely taught until the late 20th century, is considered incorrect by modern academia. Linguistics professor Dr. Sven Liljeblad from Idaho State University in Pocatello argues that "it is unlikely that Sacajawea is a Shoshoni word.… The term for 'boat' in Shoshoni is saiki, but the rest of the alleged compound would be incomprehensible to a native speaker of Shoshoni." The spelling with a "j" has subsided from general use, although the corresponding "soft j" pronunciation persists.

=== Sacagawea ===
Sacagawea is the most widely used spelling of her name, usually pronounced with a hard "g" sound (/səˌkɑːɡəˈwiːə/), occasionally with a soft "g" or "j" sound (/ˌsækədʒəˈwiːə/). Lewis and Clark's original journals mention Sacagawea by name seventeen times, spelled eight different ways, all with a "g". Clark used Sahkahgarwea, Sahcahgagwea, Sarcargahwea, and Sahcahgahweah, while Lewis used Sahcahgahwea, Sahcahgarweah, Sahcargarweah, and Sahcahgar Wea.

The spelling Sacagawea was established in 1910 by the Bureau of American Ethnology as the proper usage in government documents. It would be the spelling adopted by the U.S. Mint for use with the dollar coin, as well as the U.S. Board on Geographic Names and the National Park Service. The spelling is also used by numerous historical scholars.

=== Sakakawea ===
Sakakawea (/səˌkɑːkəˈwiːə/) is the next most widely adopted spelling, and is the most-often accepted among specialists. Proponents say the name comes from the Hidatsa tsakáka wía ('bird woman'). Charbonneau told expedition members that his wife's name meant "Bird Woman," and in May 1805 Lewis used the Hidatsa meaning in his journal:

[A] handsome river of about fifty yards in width discharged itself into the shell river… [T]his stream we called Sah-ca-gah-we-ah or bird woman's River, after our interpreter the Snake woman.

Sakakawea is the official spelling of her name according to the Three Affiliated Tribes, which include the Hidatsa. This spelling is widely used throughout North Dakota (where she is considered a state heroine), notably in the naming of Lake Sakakawea, the extensive reservoir of Garrison Dam on the Missouri River.

The North Dakota State Historical Society quotes Russell Reid's 1986 book Sakakawea: The Bird Woman:

Her Hidatsa name, which Charbonneau stated meant "Bird Woman", should be spelled "Tsakakawias" according to the foremost Hidatsa language authority, Dr. Washington Matthews. When this name is anglicized for easy pronunciation, it becomes Sakakawea, "Sakaka" meaning "bird" and "wea" meaning "woman". This is the spelling adopted by North Dakota. The spelling authorized for the use of federal agencies by the United States Geographic Board is Sacagawea. Although not closely following Hidatsa spelling, the pronunciation is quite similar and the Geographic Board acknowledged the name to be a Hidatsa word meaning "Bird Woman".

Irving W. Anderson, president of the Lewis and Clark Trail Heritage Foundation, says:

[T]he Sakakawea spelling similarly is not found in the Lewis and Clark journals. To the contrary, this spelling traces its origin neither through a personal connection with her nor in any primary literature of the expedition. It has been independently constructed from two Hidatsa Indian words found in the dictionary Ethnography and Philology of the Hidatsa Indians (1877), published by the Government Printing Office. Compiled by a United States Army surgeon, Dr. Washington Matthews, 65 years following Sacagawea's death, the words appear verbatim in the dictionary as "tsa-ka-ka, noun; a bird," and "mia [wia, bia], noun; a woman.

== In popular culture ==
Some fictional accounts speculate that Sacagawea was romantically involved with Lewis or Clark during their expedition. But, while the journals show that she was friendly with Clark and would often do favors for him, the idea of a romantic liaison was created by novelists who wrote much later about the expedition. This fiction was perpetuated in the Western film The Far Horizons (1955).

=== Film and television ===
Several movies, both documentaries and fiction, have been made about, or featuring, Sacagawea:

- The Far Horizons (1955) – played by Donna Reed
- Lewis & Clark: Great Journey West (2002) – played by Alex Rice
- Jefferson's West (2003) – played by Cedar Henry
- The Simpsons, Season 15, Episode 11: Margical History Tour (2004) – played by Lisa Simpson
- Journey of Sacagawea (2004)
- Bill and Meriwether's Excellent Adventure (2006) – played by Crystal Lysne
- Night at the Museum (2006) – played by Mizuo Peck
- The Spirit of Sacajawea (2007)
- Night at the Museum 2: Battle of the Smithsonian (2009) – played by Mizuo Peck
- Night at the Museum: Secret of the Tomb (2014) – played by Mizuo Peck

=== Literature ===
Two early twentieth-century novels shaped much of the public perception of Sacagawea. The Conquest: The True Story of Lewis and Clark (1902), was written by American suffragist Eva Emery Dye and published in anticipation of the expedition's centennial. The National American Woman Suffrage Association embraced her as a female hero, and numerous stories and essays about her were published in ladies' journals. A few decades later, Grace Raymond Hebard published Sacajawea: Guide and Interpreter of Lewis and Clark (1933) to even greater success.

Sacagawea has since become a popular figure in historical and young adult novels. In her novel Sacajawea (1984), Anna Lee Waldo explored the story of Sacajawea's returning to Wyoming 50 years after her departure. The author was well aware of the historical research supporting an 1812 death, but she chose to explore the oral tradition.

The Lost Journals of Sacajewea, by Debra Magpie Earling.

She Was Never a Guide, by the editors of Way Out West

=== Music and theatre ===
- In Philip Glass's "Piano Concerto No. 2 after Lewis & Clark", the second movement is entitled "Sacagawea".
- Sacagawea is mentioned in the Schoolhouse Rock song "Elbow Room" as the guide for Lewis and Clark.
- Sacagewea is referenced in Stevie Wonder's song "Black Man" from the album Songs in the Key of Life (1976).
- Tingstad & Rumbel's 1988 album Legends includes a piece entitled "Sacajawea".
- Sacagawea is the name of a musical by Craig Bohmler and Mary Bracken Phillips. It was commissioned by the Willows Theatre Company in northern California and premiered at the annual John Muir Festival in the summer of 2008 at the Alhambra Performing Arts Center in Martinez.
- In 2010, Italian pianist and composer Alessandra Celletti released Sketches of Sacagawea, a limited-edition tribute box set with an album and accompanying book, on Al-Kemi Lab.

=== Other media ===
The Dinner Party, an artwork installation by feminist artist Judy Chicago, features a place setting for Sacagawea in Wing Three, part of American Revolution to the Women's Revolution.

The first episode of the history podcast, The Broadsides, includes discussion of Sacagawea and her accomplishments during the Lewis and Clark Expedition.

== Memorials and honors ==
The Sacajawea Interpretive, Cultural, and Educational Center, located in Salmon, Idaho, by the rivers and mountains of Sacajawea's homeland. It contains a small museum and gift shop, in a 71-acre (290,000 m^{2}) park. It is "owned and operated by the City of Salmon, in partnership with the Bureau of Land Management, Idaho Governor's Lewis & Clark Trail Committee, Salmon-Challis National Forest, Idaho Department of Fish & Game, and numerous non-profit and volunteer organizations."

Sacagawea was an important member of the Lewis and Clark Expedition. The National American Woman Suffrage Association of the early 20th century adopted her as a symbol of women's worth and independence, erecting several statues and plaques in her memory, and doing much to spread the story of her accomplishments.

In 1959, Sacagawea was inducted into the Hall of Great Westerners of the National Cowboy & Western Heritage Museum. In 1976, she was inducted into the National Cowgirl Museum and Hall of Fame in Fort Worth, Texas. In 2001, she was given the title of Honorary Sergeant, Regular Army, by President Bill Clinton. In 2003, she was inducted into the National Women's Hall of Fame.

The USS Sacagawea is one of several United States ships named in her honor.

Every August the town of Cloverport, Kentucky, holds a festival named in her honor.

In 1994, USPS released 29-cent stamp honoring Sacagawea.

=== Coinage ===
In 2000, the United States Mint issued the Sacagawea dollar coin in her honor, depicting Sacagawea and her son, Jean Baptiste Charbonneau. Because no contemporary image of Sacagawea exists, the face on the coin was modeled on a modern Shoshone-Bannock woman, Randy'L He-dow Teton. The portrait design is unusual, as the copyrights have been assigned to and are owned by the U.S. Mint. The portrait is not in the public domain, as most U.S. coin designs are.

=== Geography and parks ===
- Lake Sakakawea in North Dakota
- Sacajawea Memorial Area, at Lemhi Pass, a National Historic Landmark managed by the National Forest Service and located on the boundary of Montana and Idaho, where visitors can hike the Lewis and Clark National Historic Trail. The Daughters of the American Revolution (DAR) created the memorial area in 1932 to honor Sacajawea for her role in the success of the Lewis and Clark Expedition.
- Mount Sacagawea, Fremont County, Wyoming, and the associated Sacagawea Glacier
- Sacagawea Heritage Trail, a bike trail in Tri-Cities, Washington
- Sacajawea Patera, a caldera on the planet Venus
- Sacajawea Peak
  - Wallowa County, Oregon
  - Sacagawea Park, Gallatin County, Montana
  - Custer County, Idaho
- Sacagawea River in Montana
- Sacajawea State Park in Pasco, Washington

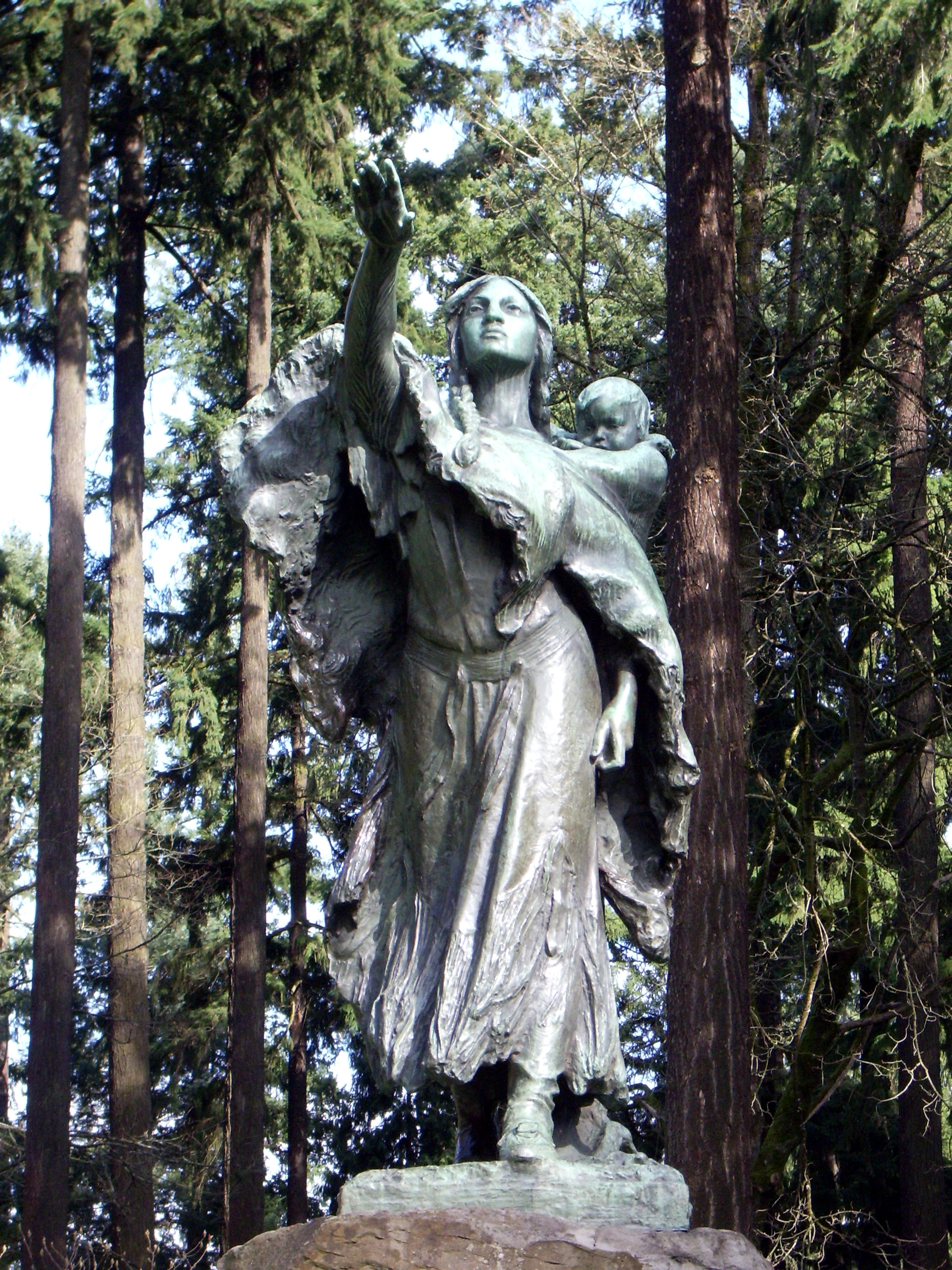
Sacajawea and Jean-Baptiste (1905), Washington Park (Portland, Oregon), Alice Cooper, sculptor

=== Sculpture ===
- Astoria, Oregon – Sacagawea and Baby by Jim Demetro: a life-size bronze statue of Sacagawea and Jean-Baptiste, located at the Clatsop National Memorial, Netul Landing in Lewis and Clark National Historical Park, outside the visitor center.
- Bismarck, North Dakota – by Leonard Crunelle (1910): depicted with baby Pomp, located on the grounds of the North Dakota State Capitol. In 2003, the state gave a replica to the National Statuary Hall Collection in the U.S. Capitol Visitor Center.
- Boise, Idaho: installed in front of the Idaho History Museum in July 2003.
- Cascade Locks, Oregon – "Sacagawea and Seaman" by Heather Söderberg (2010). Sacagawea is pointing the way with one hand and her son is holding onto the finger of her other hand. She is posed next to Seaman the dog.
- Charlottesville, Virginia – monument was removed by the city on July 10, 2021; titled Their First View of the Pacific by Charles Keck (1919). It was a statue of Meriwether Lewis, William Clark, and Sacagawea. The Charlottesville City Council voted in November 2019 to remove the statue from its location, a decision "cheered by the local Native American tribe, the Monacan Indian Nation, and descendants of Sacagawea's family in Idaho. They said the statue presented a weak and servile image of Sacagawea, who was rather an essential guide and interpreter for Lewis and Clark."
- Cheney, Washington – by Harold Balazs (1960): a statue of Sacagawea is displayed in the rose garden in front of the President's House at Eastern Washington University.
- Cody, Wyoming – by Harry Jackson (1980): painted bronze, 114 inches, the statue is located in the Greever Cashman Garden at the Buffalo Bill Historical Center
- Cody, Wyoming – by Richard V. Greeves (2005): Bronze, 72 inches, the sculpture is in the Robbie Powwow Garden at the Buffalo Bill Historical Center.
- Dayton, Washington— "Arduous Journey" by Carol Grende (2009): Statue of Sacajawea near the entrance to the Historic Pathway.
- Fort Benton, Montana – by Robert Scriver: a sculpture of Sacagawea and her baby, and Captains Lewis and Clark, in the riverside sculpture park.
- Fort Worth, Texas – by Glenna Goodacre (2001): Sacajawea statue outside the National Cowgirl Hall of Fame.
- Godfrey, Illinois – by Glenna Goodacre: at Lewis and Clark Community College; by the same artist who designed the image on the Sacagawea dollar
- Great Falls, Montana – "Explorers at the Portage", by Robert Scriver, contains a bronze 3/4 scale statue of Sacagawea, her baby Jean-Baptiste, Lewis, Clark, African American York, and the Newfoundland dog Seaman, at the Lewis and Clark National Historic Trail Interpretive Center. An earlier version of this piece, in Overlook Park in Great Falls, omits Sacajawea. The re-creation inside the museum contains Sacajawea and Baptiste.
- Great Falls, Montana— "Arduous Journey" by Carol Grende: is a 9.5 foot bronze statue of Sacajawea. The statue was dedicated to The Missouri River Federal Courthouse in 2010.
- Kansas City, Missouri – Corps of Discovery Monument by Eugene L. Daub (2000): includes life-size figures of Sacagawea and Jean-Baptiste, York, and Seaman on the bluff at Clark's Point overlook (Case Park, Quality Hill)
- Lander, Wyoming: in local cemetery, 14 miles West on U.S. 287, and then 2 miles West (after a turn); turnoff about three miles South of Fort Washakie; there is a tall statue of Sacagawea (6 ft) with tombstones downhill of her, husband, and two children; there also is a monument on site.
- Lewiston, Idaho: multiple statues, including one along the main approach to the city.
- Longview, Washington, a statue of Sacagawea and Jean-Baptiste was placed in Lake Sacajawea Park near the Hemlock St. footbridge in 2005.
- Mobridge, South Dakota – The Sacagawea Monument: an obelisk erected at the supposed site of her death, which honors Sacagawea as a member of the Shoshone tribe and for her contribution to the Corps of Discovery expedition; the associated marker "dates her death as December 20, 1812 and states that her body must be buried somewhere near the site of old Fort Manuel located 30 miles north of the marker."
- Portland, Oregon – by Alice Cooper (1905): Sacajawea and Jean-Baptiste was unveiled July 6, 1905, and moved to Washington Park, April 6, 1906.
- Portland, Oregon – by Glenna Goodacre: located at Lewis & Clark College, permanently installed on September 5, 2004/
- Richland, Washington – by Tom McClelland (2008)
- Salmon, Idaho – Sacajawea by Agnes Vincen Talbot (August 2005): A statue of Sacagawea and her son are poised in front of the Sacajawea Interpretive, Cultural & Education Center. This statue is located in a park close to Sacagawea's original homeland.
- St. Louis, Missouri – by Harry Weber (2002): a statue of Sacagawea with her baby in a cradle board is included in the diorama of the Lewis & Clark expedition that is on display in the lobby of the St. Louis Drury Plaza Hotel, located in the historical International Fur Exchange building.
- Three Forks, Montana, in Sacajawea Park – Coming Home by Mary Michael: statue honoring Sacagawea, built in the area where she was abducted as a young girl and taken to Mandan lands.
- Wind River Indian Reservation, Wyoming: According to oral tradition, Sacagawea left her husband Toussaint Charbonneau and fled to Wyoming in the 1860s; her alleged burial site is located in the reservation's cemetery, with a gravestone inscription dating her death as April 9, 1884, however, oral tradition also indicates a woman named Porivo (recorded as "Bazil's mother") occupies that grave.

== See also ==
- Sacagawea's Nickname
- Timeline of the Lewis and Clark Expedition
