= Sacajawea (novel) =

1979 novel by Anna Lee Waldo

- First ed.
- Author: Anna Lee Waldo
- Language: English
- Genre: Historical fiction
- Publisher: Avon Books
- Publication date: April 1979 (1st ed.); May 1984 (rev. ed.)
- Publication place: United States
- Media type: Print (Paperback)
- Pages: 1,359 (1st ed.); 1,408 (rev. ed.)
- ISBN: 0-380-43075-4 (1st ed.); 0-380-84293-9 (rev. ed.); 978-0-06-203591-2 (eBook)

Sacajawea is an American historical fiction novel written by Anna Lee Waldo as a fictionalized biography of Sacajawea, the Shoshone guide employed by Lewis and Clark. Published by Avon Books in 1979, portions of the novel were plagiarized from works by Charles McNichols, Frank Waters, Benjamin Capps, Vardis Fisher, Frederick Manfred, among others. A revised edition, containing significant changes to the original text, was published in May 1984.

== Production ==
The novel was written over a period of ten years according to Waldo. In addition to extensive reading, Waldo's research included tracing the Lewis and Clark Trail three times, and pushing her husband, Willis H. Waldo, to join the St. Louis Westerners, a chapter of Westerners International. The published novel exceeded 1,300 pages in its first edition, organized into fifty-eight chapters, which was approximately half the number of manuscript pages submitted to Avon in February 1973.

== Reception ==
According to Publishers Weekly the novel "in adhering so closely to the many historical sources gathered in the writing … dramatic tension is lost." The Library Journal said the novel was "tiring", and "while the basic tale is written competently, the author smothers it in minutiae." Adding the novel was "for intrepid historical fiction fans."

In South Dakota History, Richard Etulain of University of Oregon said of the novel's historical liberties and "unusual" presentation: "imagination—sheer invention—dominates this fat work." He lamented, "historians and other academics have roundly criticized—even scorned—what they consider the inadequacies and superficialities" of Waldo's work, yet the novel remains the most popular written about Lewis and Clark and Sacagawea.

== Plagiarism ==
In 1981, Benjamin Capps sued Waldo and Avon Books for copyright infringement and plagiarism of four of his novels: The Trail to Ogallala (1964), Sam Chance (1965), A Woman of the People (1966), and The White Man's Road (1969). Portions of Sacajawea, according to Capps, were lifted directly from his work in "the most outrageous case of plagiarism in the history of this country”. Charles McNichol's Crazy Weather (1944) and Frank Water's The People of the Valley (1941) were also plagiarized, as well the works of Vardis Fisher and Frederick Manfred. When asked about alleged plagiarism, Waldo explained her original "reference marks" were removed from he rmanuscript prior to publication, or she was retelling Indian legend.

Mary Charlotte Simpson wrote in a 1986 graduate thesis, "Waldo defended the charges of having copied fiction by talking of documentation taken out, as if she were being questioned on historical sources. Whether she actually did not understand the difference will probably never be known." A settlement with Capps was reached in June 1983 for approximately fifteen-percent of the novel's royalties and net profits. It is unknown if other authors settled with Waldo or Avon Books.

Charles Adams of UNLV wrote in Western American Literature: "Waldo's copious appropriations of text and thought violate the ethics adhered to by all honest writers." He concluded if a school library already holds a copy of the novel, then teachers should "set their students reading it to look for the work of other authors whose uncredited contributions might appear."

== Revised edition ==
A revised edition of the novel was published in May 1984 which included significant changes to the original text, as well as in line citations and the redaction of an entire chapter. Waldo included a note which alluded to the alleged plagiarism: "In some cases copyright owners requested that the complete source be included here in the owners' particular format." Jan DeVries and Jim Harrison are credited as editors who assisted Waldo in the revision. An ebook edition, which includes additional revisions to the text, was published by HarperCollins in 2010 (ISBN 978-0-06-203591-2).
