= Timeline of the Lewis and Clark Expedition =

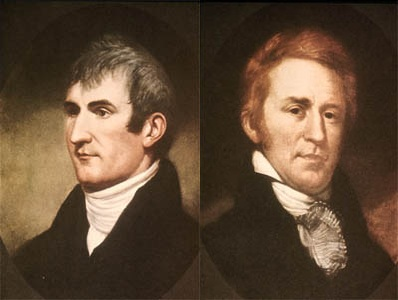
Meriwether Lewis and William Clark

This is the timeline of the Lewis and Clark Expedition through the American West, 1803–1806.

== 1802 ==
Date	Event
December	The Spanish ambassador in Washington, D.C., Carlos Martínez de Irujo, rejects the request of President Thomas Jefferson to grant Meriwether Lewis a passport to Spanish-held territories.

== 1803 ==
Date	Event
January 18	President Jefferson sends a secret message to the U.S. Congress proposing an expedition to the Pacific Northwest.
February 22	The United States House of Representatives and Senate approve Jefferson's request.
March 15	Lewis travels to the U.S. Army arsenal in Harper's Ferry, Virginia (later West Virginia) to procure arms and ammunition for the expedition.
April 19	Lewis arrives in Lancaster, Pennsylvania, where he studies the use of the sextant and chronometer for celestial navigation.
April 30	James Madison, Secretary of State, and Robert R. Livingston, U.S. Minister to France, reach an agreement to purchase the Louisiana Territory from France for $15 million.
May 14	Lewis leaves Lancaster and travels to Philadelphia to study medicine, anatomy and botany under the day's leading experts. During his three-week stay, he buys supplies and equipment as well as gifts for the Indians he expects to encounter.
June 19	Lewis writes to William Clark inviting him to co-lead the expedition.
June 20	President Jefferson sends Lewis instructions for exploring the Louisiana Territory.
July 4	The proposed Louisiana Purchase Treaty is announced in Washington, D.C.
July 15	Lewis arrives in Pittsburgh, Pennsylvania, to direct the construction of a 55-foot keelboat with a 32-foot mast and benches for 22 oarsmen. He also purchases a pirogue over 40 feet long.
July 18	Clark writes to Lewis accepting his invitation.
August 31	After more than a month of delays, the keelboat is completed and immediately loaded. With a crew of 11, Lewis heads down the Ohio River.
September 1	Lewis documents the first day of travel, beginning what becomes the Journals of the Lewis & Clark Expedition.
October 15	Lewis rendezvous with Clark in Clarksville, Indiana territory. Clark is accompanied by his African-American slave York. Over the next two weeks, they select nine civilians from a field of volunteers.
October 20	The U.S. Senate ratifies the treaty for the Louisiana Purchase.
November 15	While the Corps camps at the confluence of the Ohio and Mississippi Rivers, Lewis and Clark practice determining longitude and latitude using their surveying instruments.
November 28	The expedition arrives at the U.S. Army post at Kaskaskia, Illinois, where they recruit more men.
November 30	Governor Juan Manuel de Salcedo and former governor Sebastián Calvo de la Puerta y O'Farrill formally transfer the government of Spanish Louisiana to French governor Pierre Clement de Laussat in the capital New Orleans. Information is not conveyed to St. Louis, capital of Upper Louisiana, due to navigation being halted on the Mississippi during the winter. The area continues to be administered by the Spanish governor of Upper Louisiana, Carlos de Hault de Lassus.
December 6	Lewis travels by horseback to St. Louis in present-day Missouri intending to spend the winter procuring more supplies.
December 12	Clark arrives at the site of the expedition's winter encampment on the Mississippi River above St. Louis in Illinois. De Hault de Lassus denies Lewis permission to sail upriver until the governor consults with his superiors.
December 13	Lewis begins construction of Camp Dubois while awaiting permission from de Hault de Lassus.
December 20	French governor Laussat transfers the Louisiana Territory to incoming U.S. governor William C. C. Claiborne in a New Orleans ceremony attended by U.S. general James Wilkinson.
December 30	Formal possession of the Louisiana Territory by the United States.

== 1804 ==
Date	Event
January 28	De Hault de Lassus allows Lewis to proceed.
March 9	Three Flags Day: De Hault de Lassus receives U.S. Lt. Governor Amos Stoddard and Meriwether Lewis in St. Louis. De Hault de Lassus announces to the people of St. Louis that Spain has retroceded ownership of Louisiana to France, lowers the Spanish flag and hoists the French flag.
March 10	Three Flags Day: De Hault de Lassus lowers the French flag in St. Louis and hoists the American flag. The ceremony is attended by Stoddard and Lewis.
March 12	At the request of Stoddard, De Hault de Lassus gives a speech to Indian representatives informing them of the transfer of Upper Louisiana to the United States. The speech is witnessed by Lewis.
March 26	Lewis learns that Clark's commission has been approved but as a lieutenant rather than captain. Despite the difference in rank, a fact withheld from the men, the two share command equally throughout the expedition.
March 29	Pvts. Shields and Colter are tried for mutiny following a fight in which they threaten Sgt. John Ordway's life. Their pleas for forgiveness are accepted.
March 31	Lewis and Clark hold a ceremony formally inducting 25 recruits into the Corps. Another five men are designated to return on the keelboat the next spring before the "permanent party" crosses the Rocky Mountains.
April 7	Lewis and Clark travel to St. Louis by canoe to attend a dinner and ball.
May 14	The Corps of Discovery departs Camp Dubois under Clark's command, its crew more than 40 strong.
May 16	They reach St. Charles on the Missouri River to await Lewis's return from St. Louis.
May 17	Pvts. Collins, Hall and Werner are court martialed for being AWOL. Collins, who is convicted of additional charges, receives 50 lashes. The other two have their sentences of 25 lashes suspended.
May 21	With Lewis and Clark in command, the Corps embarks on the keelboat and two pirogues. During their 2,300 mile trip to the Rockies, the men struggle against the Missouri's current. While sails help when the winds are favorable, most progress is by rowing and either pushing or pulling the heavily ladened keelboat.
May 25	About 50 miles from St. Charles, the party passes La Charette, the westernmost Euro-American settlement on the Missouri.
June 26	The expedition encamps at Kaw Point near the Missouri's confluence with the Kansas River in present-day Kansas, 400 river miles into their journey. As a precaution against a possible attack by the regions's Kansa tribe, the men build a temporary defense, but otherwise they spend several days resting and repairing their boats.
June 29	During the Corps' stay at Kaw Point, Pvt. Collins is court martialed on charges of stealing whiskey while on guard duty. He is sentenced to receive 100 lashes. Pvt. Hall, who is tried for drinking with Collins, receives 50 lashes.
July 4	To honor Independence Day, Lewis and Clark name Independence Creek near modern-day Atchison, Kansas.
July 11	The Corps enters present-day Nebraska. Pvt. Willard is caught sleeping on guard duty, a capital offense. He is sentenced the next day to receive 100 lashes in four equal installments.
July 21	The expedition reaches the confluence of Nebraska's Platte River, 640 miles from St. Louis.
July 30	The Corps camps near today's Fort Calhoun, Nebraska, on a hill they name Council Bluff.
August 1	Carlos de Hault de Lassus warns Spanish authorities of rumors that Lewis's expedition to the Pacific is a pretext and he actually intends to invade New Mexico. His own opinion is that an unchecked expedition, regardless of goal, will facilitate the smuggling of precious metals from New Mexico through the Mississippi River System. A 32 men expedition led by Pedro Vial and José Jarvet, later joined by 20 more men, departs Santa Fe, New Mexico with aims to intercept Lewis.
August 3	Lewis and Clark meet at Council Bluff with chiefs of the Oto and Missouri tribes. While the chiefs want weapons more than token gifts, the Corps' first attempt at diplomacy is for the most part a success.
August 4	The party departs, but Pvt. Reed deserts. Two days later, the captains determine Reed is to be brought back dead or alive.
August 18	Reed is captured and returned for trial. In addition to being sentenced to a flogging in which he is required to run the gauntlet four times, Reed is expelled from the Corps. Since banishment to the wilds would be a death sentence, he is allowed to remain with the expedition through the winter.
August 20	Sgt. Floyd dies, probably from a ruptured appendix. He is the sole casualty of the two-year expedition.
August 26	The men elect Pvt. Gass sergeant. Pvt. Shannon, the Corps' youngest member, becomes lost while searching for horses stolen by the Indians.
August 27	The Corps strikes camp in Yankton Sioux territory on the Nebraska side of the Missouri near the mouth of South Dakota's James River.
August 30	Lewis and Clark hold talks with the Yanktons, who want rifles and whiskey. Instead, the tribe is invited to send a delegation to meet with the Great White Father in Washington, D.C.
September 6	Vial and Jarvet reach a Pawnee village near the Platte River in southern Nebraska. They meet Native American leaders who tell them that the United States have sent parties to several villages, informing them of the Louisiana Purchase, offering gifts, and requesting the surrender of any medals and patents given to them by the Spanish government in the past. Failing to ascertain if any of these parties is Lewis and Clark's or where their current location may be, Vial decides to return to Santa Fe two weeks later, accompanied by some Pawnees and Otoes.
September 11	Pvt. Shannon is found on the bank of the Missouri starving and out of ammunition after being lost 16 days.
September 20	They reach the Missouri's Big Bend in central South Dakota, nearly 1,300 miles from their starting point.
September 25	Weapons are drawn in a confrontation with the Lakota Sioux near modern-day Pierre, South Dakota. Elder Chief Black Buffalo diplomatically intervenes, averting bloodshed.
October 13	Pvt. Newman is convicted of mutinous talk and expelled. As with Pvt. Reed, he is permitted to remain with the expedition until the spring.
October 24	The Corps reaches Mandan Indian territory near present-day Washburn, North Dakota. Over the next few days, they meet with Mandan and Hidatsa chiefs and begin looking for a site for a winter fort.
November 2	A location for their winter fortification is selected across the river from the main Mandan village. They name the encampment Fort Mandan to honor the tribe. Construction begins.
November 4	Toussaint Charbonneau, a French fur trader living with the Mandans, is hired as an interpreter. One of his two wives, a pregnant 16-year-old Lemhi Shoshone named Sacagawea, is also hired.
December 24	Fort Mandan is completed.
December 25	The Corps celebrates Christmas with special food, rum and dancing.

== 1805 ==
Date	Event
February 9	Pvt. Howard returns after dark and scales the fort's wall instead of asking the guard to open the gate. An Indian happens to see this and scales the wall himself. In the last disciplinary trial of the expedition, Howard is charged with a breach of security and is ordered to receive 50 lashes, but Lewis suspends the sentence.
February 11	Sacagawea gives birth to a son, Jean Baptiste Charbonneau, nicknamed "Pompy" by Clark.
March 15	Spanish ambassador Irujo complains to Secretary of State Madison that the Lewis and Clark expedition is in violation of the status quo in the disputed territory, since true boundaries between the United States and Spain have yet to be defined.
April 7	With the arrival of spring, the Corps resumes its journey. The keelboat is sent back down the Missouri with a crew of a dozen men and a shipment for President Jefferson. The "permanent party" travels west in the two pirogues and six dugout canoes.
April 25	The expedition reaches the confluence of the Yellowstone River in northwestern North Dakota, the Missouri's principal northern tributary.
April 27	They enter present-day Montana. In the ensuing days, the men sight herds of up to 10,000 buffalo. They also encounter and kill their first grizzly bear.
May 14	A sudden storm tips a pirogue and many items, including the Corps' journals, spill into the river. Sacagawea calmly recovers most of the items, earning Clark's praise for her quick thinking.
May 26	Lewis sees the Rocky Mountains for the first time. His initial reaction is joy, but he then considers the serious challenges the snow-covered mountains will pose for his men.
June 1	In north-central Montana, the Corps comes to an unexpected fork in the river, with one branch flowing from the north, the other from the south. They take a vote on which is the Missouri. Only Lewis and Clark favor the southern route. After days of debate and explorations, another vote yields the same result. Despite their doubts, the men agree to follow the leaders.
June 5	A Spanish Royal Order reiterates the continuation of the mission to capture Lewis and Clark.
June 13	A scouting party led by Lewis reaches the Great Falls of the Missouri. The discovery proves they have taken the correct course.
June 17	The men circumnavigate the falls, dragging their canoes and equipment across 18 miles (30 km) of rough terrain, a month-and-a-half ordeal.
August 8	Sacagawea recognizes a natural formation from her childhood, Beaverhead Rock, indicating they are in the area where the Shoshone spend their summers.
August 12	Lewis and three other men cross the Continental Divide at Lemhi Pass on the Montana-Idaho border. Meanwhile, the expedition's shipment arrives at the President's house in Washington, D.C.
August 13	While Clark is on a scouting expedition, Lewis meets up with sixty warriors of the Shoshone nation. Once he establishes their peaceful intentions, he and his men are welcomed into the tribe's village.
August 16	When the Shoshone become fearful of being led into a trap, Lewis lends his rifle to the Chief and his men follow suit. The gesture helps gain the Shoshone's trust.
August 17	Sacagawea has a tearful reunion with her brother Cameahwait, now a Shoshone chief. Clark returns, and with Sacagawea's help, the Corps is able to negotiate for the horses needed to cross the Rockies.
September	Former Louisiana governor Salcedo forwards Santa Fe orders to arrest Lewis, promote hostility to Americans among the Natives, and encourage Natives to assist Spanish troops. Salcedo warns of deploying an excessive number of Spanish troops to the task for risk of alienating the Natives.
September 4	The expedition approaches the eastern slope of the Bitterroot Mountains and enters a valley near Sula, Montana. They are met by a band of Bitterroot Salish, also known as Flathead Indians, and spend two days resting and trading for horses. The band consists of 33 lodges, 80 men, and 400 total members.
September 11	After several days at Traveler's Rest near Lolo, Montana, the Corps begins crossing the Bitterroot Mountains, the most dangerous leg of the entire journey. Over the next 11 days, the men struggle through deep snow. Starving, they resort to eating some of their colts.
September 22	Emerging from the mountains on the Weippe Prairie, the expedition is taken in by the Nez Perce Indians. In the days ahead, everyone becomes sick from overeating the dried fish and boiled roots served by their hosts.
September 26	The party travels down north central Idaho's Clearwater River to set up an encampment for building canoes, west of present-day Orofino. Work proceeds slowly as the men recover.
October 7	The journey resumes.
October 10	The expedition enters present-day Washington at the Clearwater's confluence with the Snake River (Lewiston-Clarkston). They follow the Snake, the Columbia River's largest tributary.
October 14	The second Vial expedition departs Santa Fe, New Mexico to intercept Lewis and Clark with 106 men.
October 16	The Corps reaches the Columbia at present-day Tri-Cities. Several miles to the south, the Columbia turns west and is the modern-day border of Oregon and Washington.
October 18	Clark sights Mount Hood through the fog, some 45 miles (72 km) in the distance.
October 22	The Corps descends Celilo Falls, the beginning of a treacherous 55-mile (90 km) stretch of the Columbia.
November 5	The Spanish Vial expedition reaches the junction of the Purgatoire and Arkansas River in southern Colorado. At night, they are attacked by three Pawnee bands armed with firearms. Though the Spanish manage to push the attackers into the river and cause them casualties, the Pawnees successfully steal their supplies, forcing the return of the expedition to Santa Fe in the aftermath of the battle.
November 7	Clark writes in his journal, "Great joy in camp we are in View of the Ocian". His elation is premature. They have sighted the Columbia River's estuary and are still twenty miles (30 km) from the Pacific.
November 8	The waves in the estuary become too hazardous for the canoes, so they set up camp.
November 10	The men attempt to make progress by hugging the shoreline, but the dangerous conditions again force them to shore.
November 12	A violent thunderstorm strikes with hail, heavy rain, and gale force winds. After burying all but one of their canoes under rocks to prevent them from being crushed by the waves and floating logs, they retreat by land to a cove up river. They are pinned down here for several days as the inclement weather continues.
November 15	With a break in the weather, the estuary becomes navigable, enabling the Corps to reach the Pacific. The men land on a sandy beach that they name Station Camp. They spend the next ten days here hunting, trading with the Chinook and Clatsop Indians, and exploring the surrounding coastline.
November 24	The Corps' members vote on a site for their winter encampment. Sacagawea and York, Clark's slave, participate in the vote. Following the recommendations of the local Indians, they pick a site on the south side of the river (Oregon), where game is more plentiful.
December 8	They begin building Fort Clatsop, near modern-day Astoria.
December 30	The expedition's log fortress is completed, but the winter proves miserable as it rains during all but twelve days of their three-month stay.

== 1806 ==
Date	Event
February 12	Salcedo is chastised by the Spanish government for failing to apprehend Lewis and Clark. He responds by ordering Lt. Facundo Melgares to leave Chihuahua City, Mexico for Santa Fe with 60 men to prepare a new expedition.
March 23	The Corps departs Fort Clatsop, beginning their journey home.
April 3	Clark and six men explore the Willamette River, reaching what is now the University of Portland.
April 18	The expedition reaches the Columbia's Great Falls. They need horses to cross back the Rockies, but the Natives demand steep prices so they buy only four.
April 24	Pedro Vial leaves Santa Fe with a third expedition to capture Lewis and Clark, independently of Melgares. It numbers around 300 men. This expedition, poorly recorded, appears to have failed due to critical desertions among the militia and allied Natives composing it.
April 28	Lewis and Clark leave Oregon, following the Columbia to the Snake River in southeastern Washington.
May 3	After enduring a heavy snow storm, the Corps meets up with a familiar Nez Perce chief and 10 of his men.
May 5	The expedition reaches present-day Idaho, where they pick up the Clearwater River.
May 14	Having started their journey too early, the Corps must wait for the mountain snows to melt. The men camp for nearly a month in what is now the Nez Perce Reservation.
June 10	They pull up camp and four days later reach the Bitterroot Mountains in Montana.
June 15	Melgares leaves Santa Fe, New Mexico with 600 men (100 soldiers, 100 Natives, and 400 militia), and 2000 horses and mules.
June 24	The Corps starts to cross the Bitterroots. With the help of three Nez Perce guides, they cut 300 miles off the journey.
June 29	The expedition enters western Montana through Lolo Pass.
July 3	The Corps is divided in two to enable them to explore additional lands. Lewis leads one group down the Missouri, while Clark's takes a southern route following the Yellowstone River. Along the way, they break into smaller exploratory groups.
July 25	Clark names a rock formation on the Yellowstone for Sacagawea's son, a site now known as Pompeys Pillar. Clark inscribes his name and the date on the rock face, the only remaining physical evidence of the Corps' journey.
July 26	Traveling on horseback, Lewis and his men encounter a small band of Blackfeet warriors. They spend the night together, but in the morning two Blackfeet braves are killed while trying to steal the group's guns and horses. Afraid of reprisals, the men ride for nearly 24 hours.
August 2	Clark's group reaches the Missouri and enters present-day North Dakota.
August 11	Lewis is accidentally shot in the buttocks by one of his men.
August 12	The Corps reunites on the Missouri in western North Dakota near the mouth of Knife River.
August 14	The expedition returns to a warm welcome by the Hidatsa and Mandan tribes.
August 17	The men continue down the Missouri, leaving Charbonneau, Sacagawea and their son with the Mandans. Clark offers to raise the boy, who is now 19 months old. With the Missouri's current in their favor, they are able to cover over 70 miles a day.
September 1	Melgares arrives in the Pawnee villages south of the Republican River, near present-day Guide Rock, Nebraska. He presents the Pawnees with Spanish flags and medals, but is persuaded by their chief Characterish (father of Sharitahrish) to not proceed to the Missouri River.
September 12	Lewis and Clark camp near St. Michael's Prairie, opposite modern St. Joseph, Missouri. They cross paths with Robert McClellan, an old army acquaintance of both who is sailing upriver with Indian trade goods. McClellan tells the expedition that many in the U.S. believe them dead or captured by the Spanish and forced to work in their mines. Ordway writes that McClellan gifted wine to the officers, and "as much whiskey as we all could drink" to the party.
Middle September	Melgares starts the return to New Mexico, concerned about the poor state of his horses, morale of his men, and growing animosity between Spaniards and Natives. He is 140 miles west of the Missouri River.
September 23	Lewis and Clark arrive in St. Louis, successfully concluding their 8,000-mile journey after two years, four months and 10 days.
December 28	Lewis arrives in Washington, D.C.

== 1807 ==
Date	Event
January 15	Clark arrives in Washington, D.C. He is appointed Agent for Indian Affairs in the Louisiana Territory.
End of February	Jefferson appoints Lewis Governor of Upper Louisiana.

== See also ==
- Dunbar and Hunter Expedition (1804)
- Red River Expedition (1806)
- Pike Expedition (1806)
