= Sacagawea River =

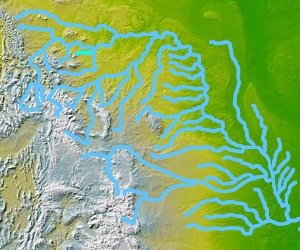
- The Sacagawea River

Location
- Country: Petroleum and Fergus County, Montana

Physical characteristics
- Source
  - coordinates: 47°21′59″N 108°54′01″W
- Mouth
  - coordinates: 47°27′11″N 107°57′46″W
  - elevation: 2,247 feet (685 m)

Basin features
- River system: Missouri River

The Sacagawea River is a tributary of the Musselshell River, approximately 30 mi (48 km) long, in north-central Montana in the United States. It rises on the plains of northern Fergus County and flows eastward. The river formerly joined the Musselshell five miles above the confluence of the Musselshell with the Missouri, but it now flows into the arm of Fort Peck Lake on the Missouri formed by the mouth of the Musselshell.

== History ==
The river was explored during the Lewis and Clark Expedition and named after their guide, Sacagawea. The river was named after her because she was in a canoe, and got caught in a storm. The canoe nearly tipped over, the expedition members were trying to balance the boat, but Sacajawea collected all the books, records, and instruments from the journey. They may have been covered in some material which prevented water damage. The river was named after her for this deed.

== Variant names ==
The Sacagawea River has also been known as: Bird Womans River, Birdwoman's River, Crooked Creek, Sah cah ger we-ah River, Sah-ca-gee-me-ah River, Sahcagahwea River.

== See also ==
- List of rivers of Montana
- Montana Stream Access Law
