= Sacajawea Peak (Lost River Range, Idaho) =

Mountain in Idaho, United States

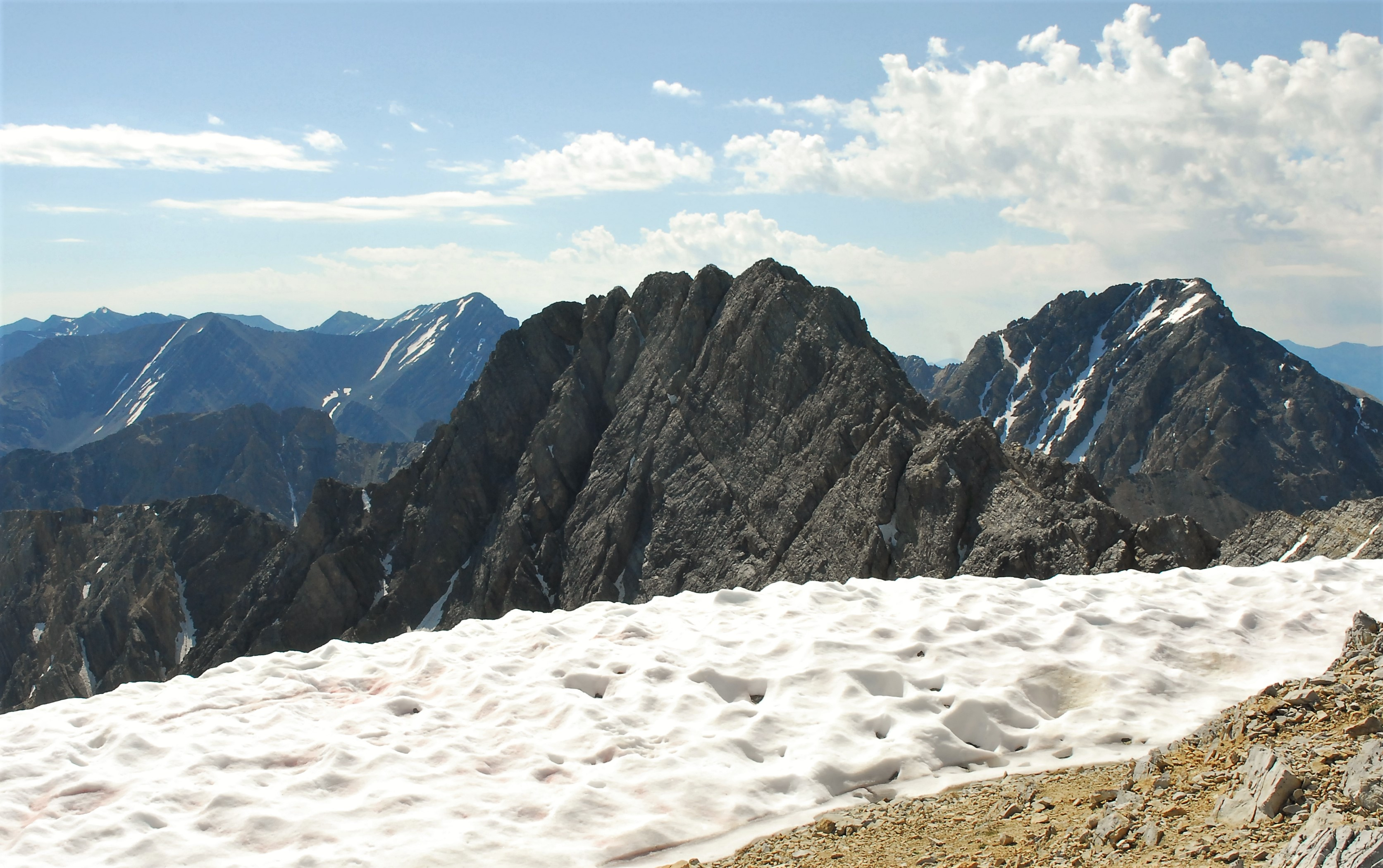
- North aspect, centered (Mount Idaho to the right)

Highest point
- Elevation: 11,936 ft (3,638 m)
- Prominence: 476 ft (145 m)
- Parent peak: Borah Peak (12,662 ft)
- Isolation: 1.03 mi (1.66 km)
- Coordinates: 44°07′22″N 113°46′41″W

Naming
- Etymology: Sacagawea

Geography
- Location within Idaho Location within the United States
- Country: United States
- State: Idaho
- County: Custer
- Protected area: Salmon–Challis National Forest
- Parent range: Lost River Range; Rocky Mountains
- Topo map: USGS Elkhorn Creek

Geology
- Rock age: Paleozoic
- Mountain type: Fault block
- Rock type: Dolomite

Climbing
- Easiest route: class 4 scrambling Northwest Ridge

Sacajawea Peak is an 11,936-foot elevation (3,638 m) mountain summit in Custer County, Idaho, United States.

== Description ==
Sacajawea Peak ranks as the 13th-highest peak in Idaho and is located on the crest of the Lost River Range which is a subrange of the Rocky Mountains. The mountain is set on land managed by Salmon–Challis National Forest. Neighbors include Mount Idaho 1.16 mile south and Borah Peak, the highest peak in Idaho, is one mile to the north. Precipitation runoff from the mountain's west slopes drains to Big Lost River, whereas the east slopes drain to the Pahsimeroi River. Topographic relief is significant as the summit rises 5,600 feet (1,700 meters) above Thousand Springs Valley in 4.5 miles (7.2 km) and the north face rises 1,900 feet (580 meters) in 0.35 mile (0.56 km). This landform's unofficial toponym honors Sacagawea, the most frequently honored woman in the United States with four mountain peaks and one glacier named for her, and at least 16 statues created in tribute to her.

== Climate ==
Based on the Köppen climate classification, Sacajawea Peak is located in an alpine subarctic climate zone with long, cold, snowy winters, and cool to warm summers. Winter temperatures can drop below −10 °F with wind chill factors below −30 °F.

== See also ==
- List of mountain peaks of Idaho
