= Sacajawea Peaks (Idaho and Montana) =

Mountain in Montana and Idaho, United States

Highest point
- Coordinates: 45.2508°N 113.6800°W

Sacajawea Peaks is a summit in the U.S. states of Montana and Idaho.

The peaks were named for Sacajawea, an Indian guide on the Lewis and Clark Expedition.
