= Sacagawea Glacier =

Glacier in Wyoming

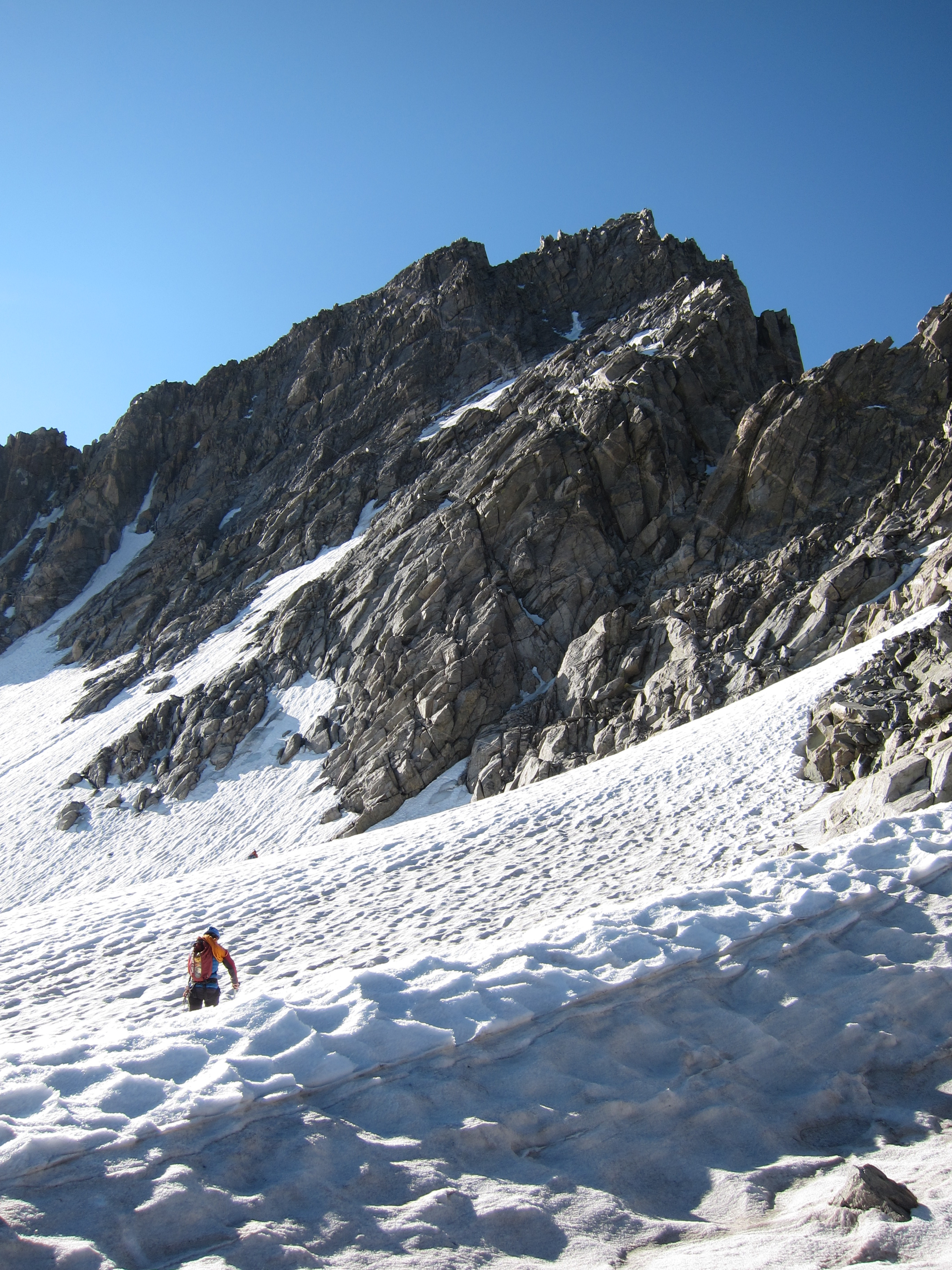
- Sacagawea Glacier below Mount Sacagawea at right

- Location within Wyoming
- Type: Mountain glacier
- Location: Fremont County, Wyoming, USA
- Coordinates: 43°08′37″N 109°36′42″W
- Length: 1.25 mi (2.01 km)
- Terminus: Moraine
- Status: Retreating

Sacagawea Glacier is east of the Continental Divide in the northern Wind River Range in the U.S. state of Wyoming. The glacier is located in the Fitzpatrick Wilderness of Shoshone National Forest, and is among the largest grouping of glaciers in the American Rocky Mountains. Sacagawea Glacier flows to the east, from a northeast facing cirque, starting near the summit of Mount Sacagawea. A large moraine and small proglacial lake are situated beyond the terminal east end of the glacier.

== See also ==
- List of glaciers in the United States
