= Anna Lee Waldo =

American author, chemistry professor

- Born: February 16, 1925 (age 101); Great Falls, Montana, U.S.
- Education: Montana State University; University of Maryland
- Occupation: Author
- Spouse: Willis H. Waldo
- Children: 5
- Writing career
- Genre: Historical fiction
- Notable work: Sacajawea (1979)

Anna Lee Waldo (born February 16, 1925) is an American historical fiction author. She is most noted for her novel Sacajawea.

== Biography ==
Anna Lee Waldo was born February 16, 1925, in Great Falls, Montana, and grew up in Whitefish. She claims her interest in the subject of Native Americans began as a child when she collected spear points on the shores of Whitefish Lake in Montana and listened to stories of Blackfeet and Crow grandmothers. Growing up though, she was interested and had a talent for science; graduating from Montana State University majoring in chemistry. She attended the University of Maryland gaining a master's degree in organic chemistry, where she also met her future husband, Willis H. Waldo, a fellow chemist. They had five children together. Prior to her first novel, Sacajawea, she taught at the University of Dayton in Ohio. She has also taught chemistry at California Polytechnic State University in San Luis Obispo, California.

It took Waldo ten years to write and research Sacajawea, a 1300+ page book, finally publishing it in 1978. This led to her second novel, Prairie, and finally to her Druid Circle series about a Welsh prince and his travel to North America in the 12th Century.

== Literary works ==
- Waldo, Anna Lee (2003) [1978]. Sacajawea. New York: Avon Books. ISBN 0-380-84293-9. OCLC 156873755.
- Waldo, Anna Lee (2001). Circle of stars. Druid Circle. New York: St. Martin's Press. ISBN 0-312-20380-2. OCLC 46976523.
- Waldo, Anna Lee (1999). Circle of stones. Druid Circle. New York: St. Martin's Press. ISBN 0-312-19843-4. OCLC 40305566.
- Waldo, Anna Lee (1986). Prairie : the legend of Charles Burton Irwin and the Y6 ranch. New York: Berkley Books. ISBN 0-425-09670-X. OCLC 14510874.
