= Mount Sacagawea =

Mountain in Wyoming, United States

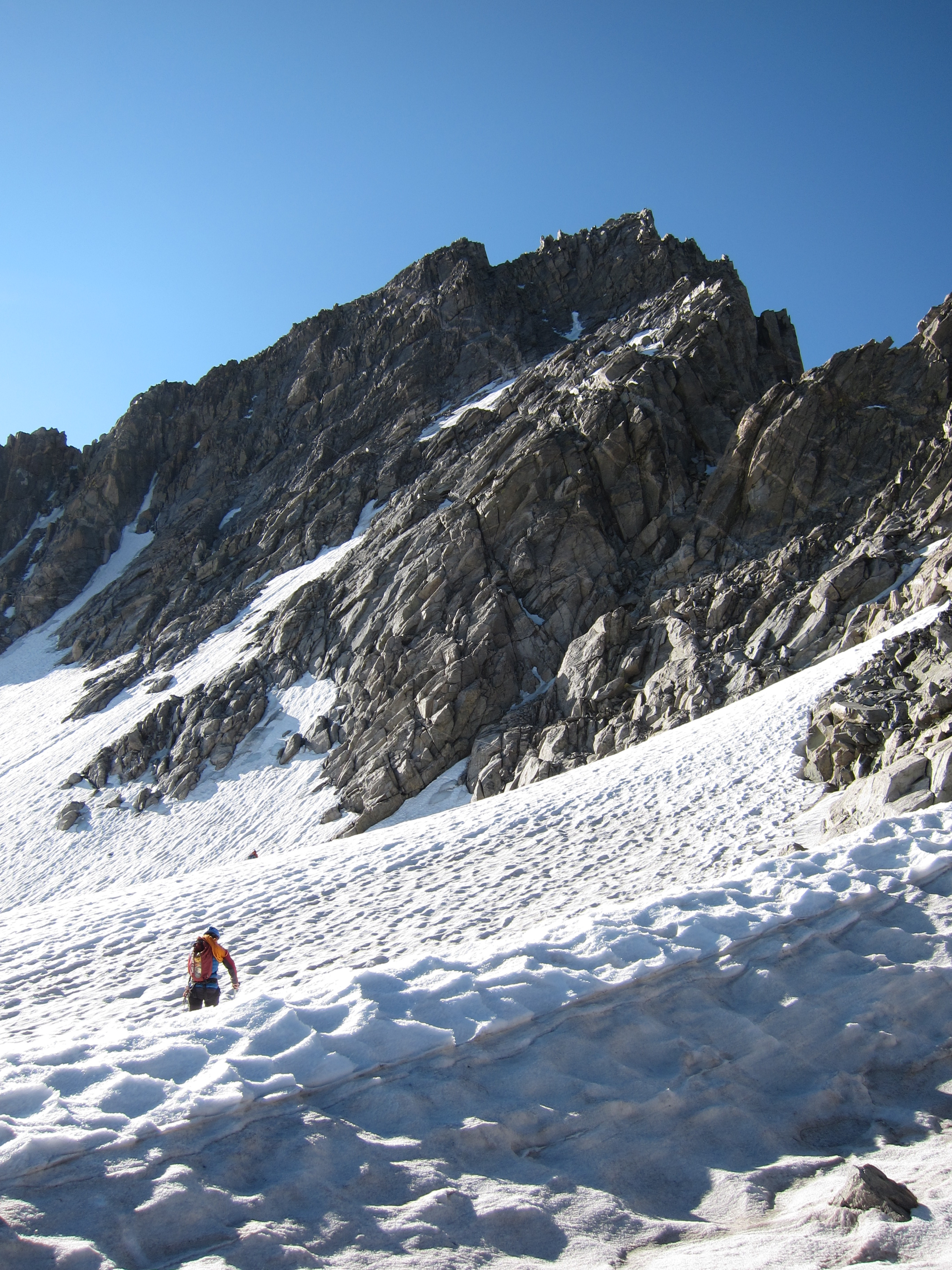
- Mount Sacagawea from Sacagawea Glacier

Highest point
- Elevation: 13,575 ft (4,138 m)
- Prominence: 409 ft (125 m)
- Listing: Mountains of Wyoming
- Coordinates: 43°08′12″N 109°37′30″W

Geography
- Location within Wyoming Location within the United States
- Location: Fremont / Sublette counties, Wyoming, U.S.
- Parent range: Wind River Range
- Topo map: USGS Fremont Peak North (WY)

Geology
- Rock type: Migmatite

Climbing
- First ascent: 1926 Albert Ellingwood, Eleanor Davis, Stephen Hart, Marion Warner

Mount Sacagawea (13,575 ft (4,138 m)) is the eighth-highest peak in the U.S. state of Wyoming and the seventh-highest in the Wind River Range. It was named after Sacagawea, the young Lemhi Shoshone woman who accompanied the Lewis and Clark Expedition as an interpreter and guide. The Upper Fremont Glacier is located southeast and the Sacagawea Glacier is northeast of the mountain. Straddling the Continental Divide, Mount Sacagawea is one mile (1.6 km) northwest of Fremont Peak.

== Gallery ==
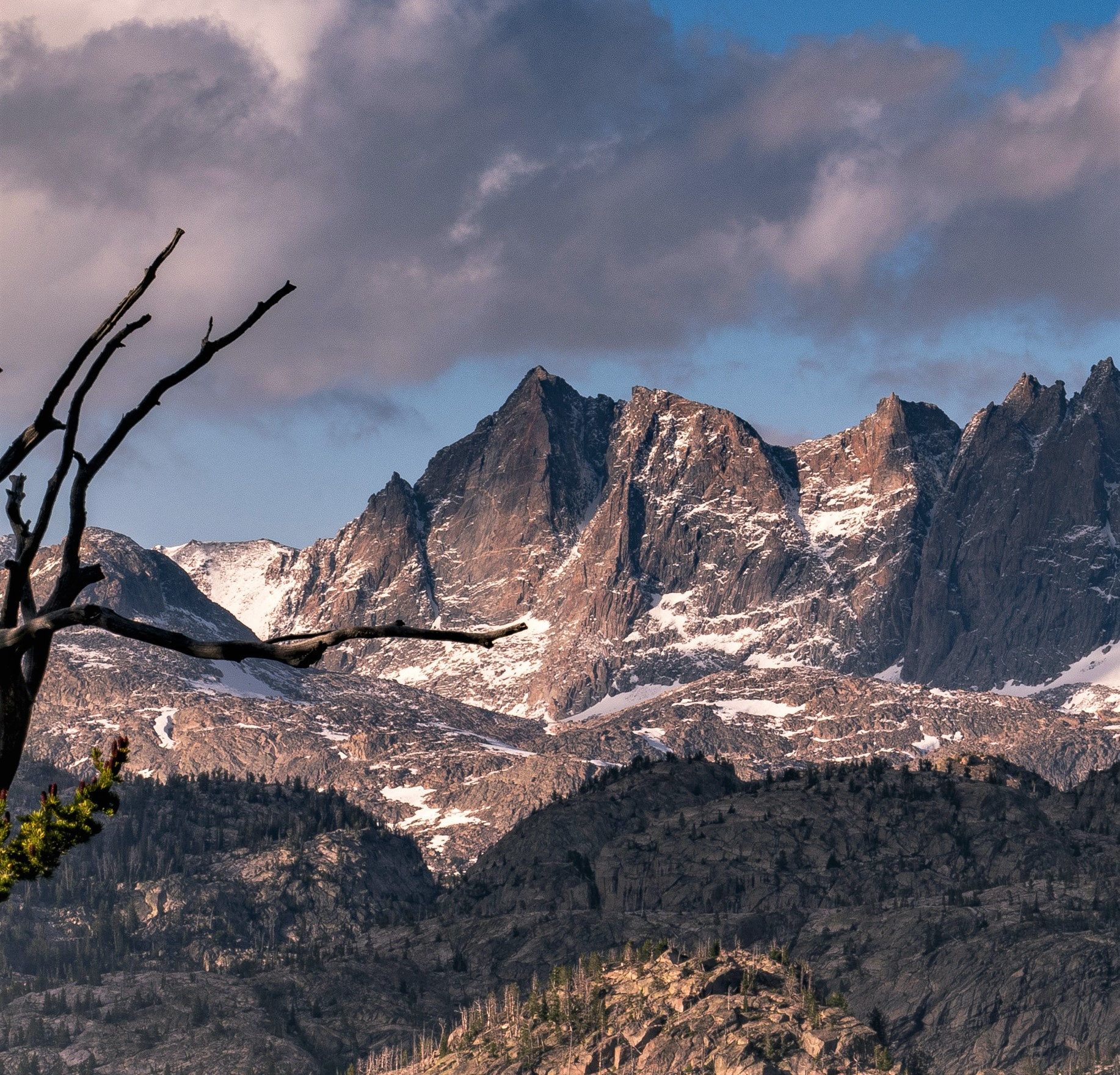
Southwest aspect

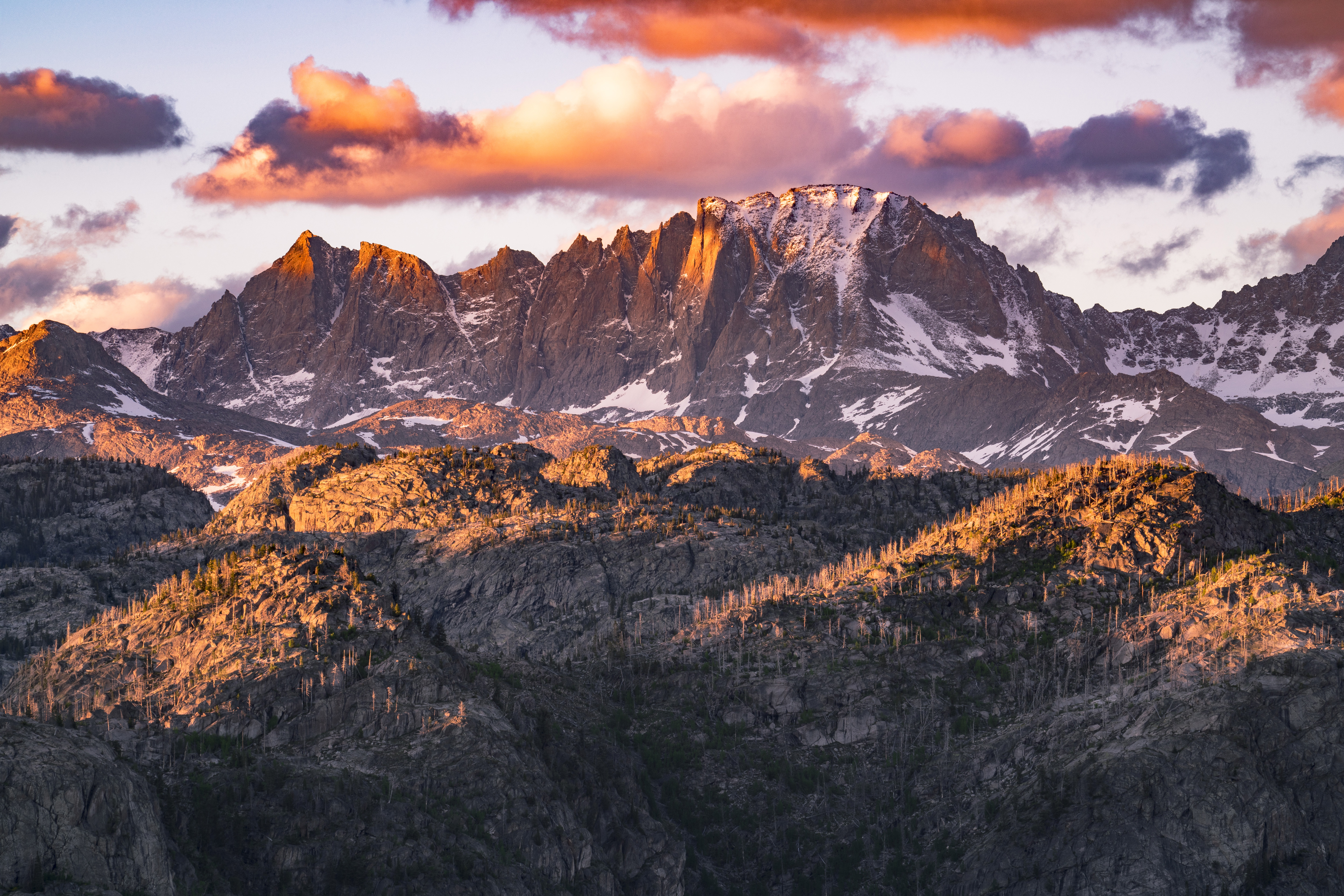
Mount Sacagawea (left) and Fremont Peak (right of center)

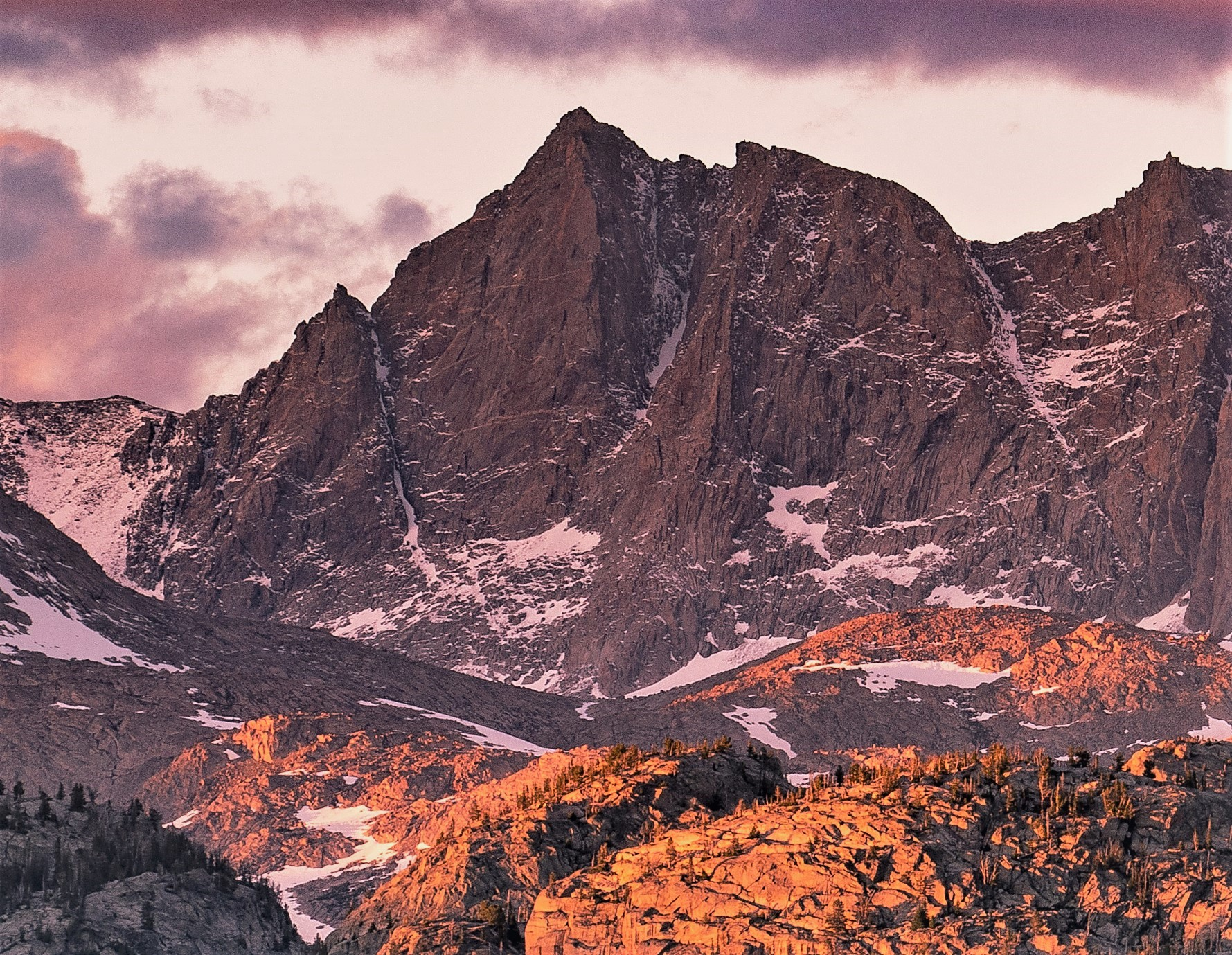
Southwest aspect at sunset
