= Leadore, Idaho =

- City
- Location of Leadore in Lemhi County, Idaho
- Coordinates: 44°40′48″N 113°21′33″W
- Country: United States
- State: Idaho
- County: Lemhi

Area
  - Total: 0.31 sq mi (0.80 km^{2})
  - Land: 0.31 sq mi (0.80 km^{2})
  - Water: 0 sq mi (0.00 km^{2})
- Elevation: 5,971 ft (1,820 m)

Population (2020)
  - Total: 98
  - Estimate (2019): 106
  - Density: 343.5/sq mi (132.62/km^{2})
- Time zone: UTC-7 (Mountain (MST))
  - Summer (DST): UTC-6 (MDT)
- ZIP code: 83464
- Area code: 208
- FIPS code: 16-45910
- GNIS feature ID: 2411640

Leadore is a city in Lemhi County, Idaho, United States. As of the 2020 census, Leadore had a population of 98.

== History ==
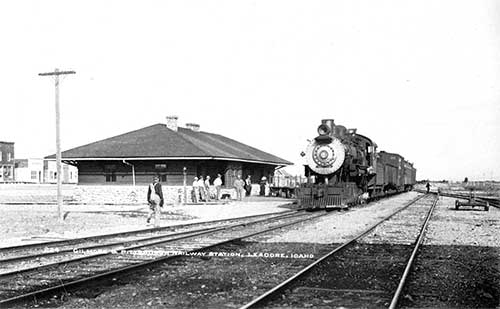
A train of the Gilmore & Pittsburgh Railroad pauses at the railway's depot in Leadore, August 1912.

The town of Leadore dates from 1910, when the Gilmore and Pittsburgh Railroad was constructed from Armstead, Montana, over Bannock Pass and into the Lemhi Valley. This occurred because the original location for the train station in the town of Junction had to be altered when the owner of the land refused to sell. The town was home to the railroad's repair shops, and was the point where the railroad's branch line to Gilmore connected with the main line.

Though the railroad ceased operating in 1939, Leadore has remained the largest town in the immediate area.

In 2001 a replica of the town's old railway station was constructed in Leadore. The new building serves as the town's community center.

Leadore is home to the Leadore School, a public K-12 school.

== Geography ==
Leadore is located in southeastern Lemhi County in the Lemhi Valley. The Lemhi River flows through the northeast side of the city, running northwest to join the Salmon River at Salmon, Idaho.

Idaho State Highway 28 (Railroad Street) passes through the center of Leadore, leading northwest 45 miles (72 km) to Salmon, the county seat, and southeast 90 miles (140 km) to Interstate 15 at Sage Junction. Idaho State Highway 29 leads northeast from Leadore 13 miles (21 km) to the Montana state line at Bannock Pass on the Continental Divide. Montana Secondary Highway 324 continues northeast from Bannock Pass to join Interstate 15 at Clark Canyon Dam, 48 miles (77 km) northeast of Leadore.

According to the United States Census Bureau, Leadore has a total area of 0.31 square miles (0.80 km^{2}), all of it land.

=== Climate ===
Leadore has a steppe climate (BSk) according to the Köppen climate classification system.

Climate data for Leadore, Idaho, 1991–2020 normals, extremes 1965–present
Month	Jan	Feb	Mar	Apr	May	Jun	Jul	Aug	Sep	Oct	Nov	Dec	Year
Record high °F (°C)	53 (12)	56 (13)	69 (21)	77 (25)	91 (33)	97 (36)	102 (39)	99 (37)	93 (34)	84 (29)	69 (21)	60 (16)	102 (39)
Mean daily maximum °F (°C)	29.7 (−1.3)	33.6 (0.9)	43.1 (6.2)	52.3 (11.3)	62.4 (16.9)	70.8 (21.6)	82.5 (28.1)	81.4 (27.4)	71.0 (21.7)	55.4 (13.0)	39.5 (4.2)	28.5 (−1.9)	54.2 (12.3)
Daily mean °F (°C)	17.3 (−8.2)	20.7 (−6.3)	30.9 (−0.6)	38.6 (3.7)	47.3 (8.5)	54.2 (12.3)	62.0 (16.7)	60.9 (16.1)	52.3 (11.3)	40.2 (4.6)	27.6 (−2.4)	17.1 (−8.3)	39.1 (4.0)
Mean daily minimum °F (°C)	4.9 (−15.1)	7.8 (−13.4)	18.7 (−7.4)	25.0 (−3.9)	32.1 (0.1)	37.7 (3.2)	41.4 (5.2)	40.4 (4.7)	33.6 (0.9)	24.9 (−3.9)	15.7 (−9.1)	5.7 (−14.6)	24.0 (−4.4)
Record low °F (°C)	−38 (−39)	−38 (−39)	−21 (−29)	−8 (−22)	4 (−16)	19 (−7)	24 (−4)	19 (−7)	10 (−12)	−14 (−26)	−22 (−30)	−40 (−40)	−40 (−40)
Average precipitation inches (mm)	0.32 (8.1)	0.31 (7.9)	0.53 (13)	0.87 (22)	1.55 (39)	1.62 (41)	0.90 (23)	0.90 (23)	0.79 (20)	0.68 (17)	0.36 (9.1)	0.51 (13)	9.34 (236.1)
Source 1: NOAA (precipitation 1981–2010)
Source 2: National Weather Service

== Demographics ==
Historical population
Census	Pop.	Note	%±
1950	159		—
1960	112		−29.6%
1970	111		−0.9%
1980	114		2.7%
1990	74		−35.1%
2000	90		21.6%
2010	105		16.7%
2020	98		−6.7%
U.S. Decennial Census

=== 2010 census ===
As of the census of 2010, there were 105 people, 48 households, and 24 families residing in the city. The population density was 338.7 inhabitants per square mile (130.8/km^{2}). There were 81 housing units at an average density of 261.3 per square mile (100.9/km^{2}). The racial makeup of the city was 100.0% White.

There were 48 households, of which 29.2% had children under the age of 18 living with them, 41.7% were married couples living together, 2.1% had a female householder with no husband present, 6.3% had a male householder with no wife present, and 50.0% were non-families. 50.0% of all households were made up of individuals, and 31.3% had someone living alone who was 65 years of age or older. The average household size was 2.19 and the average family size was 3.38.

The median age in the city was 41.3 years. 27.6% of residents were under the age of 18; 6.7% were between the ages of 18 and 24; 20.1% were from 25 to 44; 25.8% were from 45 to 64; and 20% were 65 years of age or older. The gender makeup of the city was 51.4% male and 48.6% female.

=== 2000 census ===
As of the census of 2000, there were 90 people, 43 households, and 20 families residing in the city. The population density was 275.1 inhabitants per square mile (106.2/km^{2}). There were 66 housing units at an average density of 201.7 per square mile (77.9/km^{2}). The racial makeup of the city was 100.00% White.

There were 43 households, out of which 23.3% had children under the age of 18 living with them, 41.9% were married couples living together, 2.3% had a female householder with no husband present, and 51.2% were non-families. 46.5% of all households were made up of individuals, and 20.9% had someone living alone who was 65 years of age or older. The average household size was 2.09 and the average family size was 3.10.

In the city, the population was spread out, with 24.4% under the age of 18, 1.1% from 18 to 24, 24.4% from 25 to 44, 28.9% from 45 to 64, and 21.1% who were 65 years of age or older. The median age was 46 years. For every 100 females, there were 91.5 males. For every 100 females age 18 and over, there were 100.0 males.

The median income for a household in the city was $11,786, and the median income for a family was $13,750. Males had a median income of $32,188 versus $16,250 for females. The per capita income for the city was $9,452. There were 47.6% of families and 44.8% of the population living below the poverty line, including 50.0% of under eighteens and 28.6% of those over 64.

== Notable people ==
- Merrill Beyeler, former Idaho state politician

== See also ==
- List of cities in Idaho

== See also ==
Media related to Leadore, Idaho at Wikimedia Commons
