= Patterson, Idaho =

Unincorporated community in the state of Idaho, United States

- Unincorporated community
- Location within Idaho Location within the United States
- Coordinates: 44°31′25″N 113°42′44″W
- Country: United States
- State: Idaho
- County: Lemhi
- Elevation: 6,034 ft (1,839 m)
- Time zone: UTC-7 (Mountain (MST))
  - Summer (DST): UTC-6 (MDT)
- Area codes: 208, 986
- GNIS feature ID: 397011

Patterson is an unincorporated community in Lemhi County, Idaho, United States. Patterson is 20 miles (32 km) southwest of Leadore. Patterson has had 11 mayors since its founding in 1897 the first being Ian W. Owens.
