= Puddin Mountain =

Mountain in the state of Idaho

Coordinates: 45°06′32″N 114°37′13″W

Puddin Mountain is a summit in Lemhi County, Idaho, in the United States. With an elevation of 9,173 feet (2,796 m), Puddin Mountain is the 277th highest summit in the state of Idaho.

The mountain was named in honor of Puddin River Wilson, a tavern owner.
