= Agency Creek =

Agency Creek may refer to:

- Agency Creek (Idaho), a stream in Idaho
- Agency Creek (South Yamhill River tributary), a stream in Oregon
