= Elk Bend, Idaho =

Unincorporated community in the state of Idaho, United States

- Unincorporated community
- Location within Idaho Location within the United States
- Coordinates: 44°53′04″N 113°58′08″W
- Country: United States
- State: Idaho
- County: Lemhi
- Elevation: 4,380 ft (1,340 m)
- Time zone: UTC-7 (Mountain (MST))
  - Summer (DST): UTC-6 (MDT)
- ZIP Code: 83467
- Area codes: 208, 986 (exchange: 894)
- GNIS feature ID: 1828972

Elk Bend is an unincorporated community in Lemhi County, Idaho.

Elk Bend was originally established in the mid-1960s as a collection of real estate development projects. These projects were named the Salmon River Estates (Unit 1 and 2), with Salmon Meadows and its annex added later. While land was purchased and held on to for years, most development of the community didn't occur until the early 2000s, when residents who had previously bought land in the area reached retirement age and built houses and manufactured homes to retire to.

Elk Bend is loosely organized around its local volunteer fire department, and as such, locals use their designated fire unit numbers over the real estate development codes for their communities. Unit 1 and 2 share the same areas and names as their real estate designations, but Salmon Meadows Annex and Salmon Meadows are designated Units 3 and 4 respectively.

In local commercial development, Elk Bend has a local RV park/store, and The Dusty Mule Bar in Unit 1. Each real estate unit is also served by separate water and sewage facilities, with different rules and organizations around each of them (for instance, using those services in Unit 2 makes you a collective shareholder in the company, Unit 1 is privately owned, and Units 3 and 4 provide seasonal rates). The rest of the community needs are filled through Salmon to the north, or Challis to the south.

Elk Bend is also credited as being the home of Dugout Dick, who had built a series of dugouts in caverns which he had hand carved himself throughout his life. The dugouts have since been collapsed and closed since his death, but his old cabin alongside where the dugouts used to exist has since been turned into a tourism site.

US 93 serves the community, connecting it with Salmon located 21 miles to the north and Challis located 38 miles to the south. Goldbug Hot Springs is located near Elk Bend.
