= Idaho State Highway 29 =

State highway in Idaho, Utah, United States

State Highway 29
- Railroad Canyon Road
- SH-29 highlighted in red

Route information
- Maintained by ITD
- Length: 13.614 mi (21.910 km)

Major junctions
- South end: SH-28 in Leadore
- North end: S-324 at Bannock Pass

Location
- Country: United States
- State: Idaho
- Counties: Lemhi

Highway system
- Idaho State Highway System; Interstate; US; State
← SH-28	→ US 30

State Highway 29 (SH-29) is a 13.614-mile-long (21.910 km) state highway in Idaho. SH-29 runs from SH-28 in Leadore to Montana Secondary Highway 324 (S-324) at the Montana state line at Bannock Pass.

== Route description ==
SH-29 begins at an intersection with SH-28 in the town of Leadore. The highway continues northeast as Railroad Canyon Road before turning north and entering the forest. The road curves through the mountains until it reaches the Montana state line at Bannock Pass, where it becomes Montana Secondary Highway 324.

== History ==
According to some historic maps, the original route for Highway 29 was nearly the same as present day SH-33 from Sugar City at Digger Drive (U.S. Route 191 at the time), to the Wyoming state border near Teton Pass.

== Junction list ==
The entire route is in Lemhi County.

Location	mi	km	Destinations	Notes
Leadore	0.000	0.000	SH-28	
	13.614	21.910	S-324	Montana state line
1.000 mi = 1.609 km; 1.000 km = 0.621 mi

== See also ==
- List of state highways in Idaho
- List of highways numbered 29
