= Carmen, Idaho =

Unincorporated community in the state of Idaho, United States

- Unincorporated community
- Location within Idaho Location within the United States
- Coordinates: 45°14′33″N 113°53′36″W
- Country: United States
- State: Idaho
- County: Lemhi
- Elevation: 3,826 ft (1,166 m)
- Time zone: UTC-7 (Mountain (MST))
  - Summer (DST): UTC-6 (MDT)
- ZIP code: 83462
- Area codes: 208, 986
- GNIS feature ID: 397530

Carmen is an unincorporated community in Lemhi County, Idaho, United States. Carmen is located on U.S. Route 93 4.5 miles (7.2 km) north of Salmon. Carmen has a post office with ZIP code 83462.

== History ==
Carmen's population was estimated at 200 in 1909, and was 10 in 1960.

== Climate ==
This climatic region is typified by large seasonal temperature differences, with warm to hot (and often humid) summers and cold (sometimes severely cold) winters. According to the Köppen Climate Classification system, Carmen has a humid continental climate, abbreviated "Dfb" on climate maps.
