= Armstead, Montana =

- Ghost town
- Location within Montana
- Coordinates: 44°58′21″N 112°51′51″W
- Country: United States
- State: Montana
- County: Beaverhead
- Established: 1907
- Abandoned: 1962
- Named after: Harry Armstead
- Elevation: 5,545 ft (1,690 m)
- GNIS feature ID: 1797309

Armstead is a former community in Beaverhead County, Montana, United States, about 21 miles (34 km) south of the county seat of Dillon. It was named after miner Harry Armstead. Armstead was located in a narrow valley of the Beaverhead River, near the mouth of Horse Prairie Creek. The town was a station stop on the Union Pacific Railroad line from Idaho Falls, Idaho to Butte, Montana. There was a post office in Armstead from 1907 to 1962.

Armstead is perhaps best remembered as the eastern terminus and headquarters of the Gilmore and Pittsburgh Railroad, which operated a line from there to Salmon, Idaho between 1910 and 1939.

The Lewis and Clark expedition traveled past the future location of Armstead during its westward trek in 1805.

The construction of Clark Canyon Dam in 1961–1964 created a reservoir that completely inundated the former site of Armstead. The town was still a viable community when the decision to build the dam was made. Because of this, some people do not categorize Armstead as being a ghost town. When the water level is low enough parts of the old highway, railroad, and even some building foundations are still visible.
