= Junction, Idaho =

Unincorporated community in the state of Idaho, United States

Coordinates: 44°42′03″N 113°22′14″W

Junction is an unincorporated community in Lemhi County, in the U.S. state of Idaho.

== History ==
Bannock had its start when A. M. Stephenson established a hotel at the site. The community was so named from its location at the junction of Bannock pass road and the Mormon road. A post office called Junction was established in 1874, and remained in operation until 1919.
