= Gibbonsville, Idaho =

Unincorporated community in the state of Idaho, United States

- Unincorporated community
- Location within Idaho Location within the United States
- Coordinates: 45°33′20″N 113°55′23″W
- Country: United States
- State: Idaho
- County: Lemhi
- Elevation: 4,570 ft (1,390 m)
- Time zone: UTC-7 (Mountain (MST))
  - Summer (DST): UTC-6 (MDT)
- ZIP code: 83463
- Area codes: 208, 986
- GNIS feature ID: 396546

Gibbonsville is an unincorporated community in Lemhi County, Idaho, United States. Gibbonsville is 26 miles (42 km) north of Salmon. Gibbonsville has ZIP code 83463.

== History ==
Gibbonsville is named for John Gibbon.

Gibbonsville's population was 735 in 1909, and was 125 in 1960.

On September 5, 2024, the Gibbonsville post office was officially discontinued. It had been out of service since 1999. A typo introduced during the discontinuance process has resulted in the official postal name being changed to "Gibbsonville".

== Climate ==
Gibbonsville, nestled in the Bitterroot Mountains, has a climate rather typical of its region, although it is warmer than stations located at higher elevations. The climate is of the Warm Summer Humid Continental type (Köppen Dfb), but is quite different than most climates with this classification, owing to characteristics shared with its climatic brethren in the Bitterroot range, as well as parts of Wyoming and Montana (foremost among them being West Yellowstone, Montana), such as the high daily ranges of temperature throughout the year, being 18.6 degrees Fahrenheit (10.3 °C) in December, rising to nearly 40 degrees Fahrenheit (22.2 °C) in July. Also in July and the rest of the Summer, nights remain cool, averaging between 40 °F (4 °C) and 45 °F (7 °C), despite warm to hot afternoon highs, a characteristic of locations throughout the Bitterroots, the Teton Range, and Yellowstone Plateau. Although Gibbonsville does not have true wet and dry seasons, there is significantly more precipitation in winter than summer. Snowfall averages around 80 inches per year, a hefty average compared with most of the U.S., but rather typical for its region. The average of 80 inches usually falls between November and April, with January being the snowiest month.

Climate data for Gibbonsville, Idaho, 1991–2020 normals, extremes 1895–present
Month	Jan	Feb	Mar	Apr	May	Jun	Jul	Aug	Sep	Oct	Nov	Dec	Year
Record high °F (°C)	48 (9)	55 (13)	73 (23)	85 (29)	94 (34)	100 (38)	100 (38)	100 (38)	98 (37)	85 (29)	67 (19)	54 (12)	100 (38)
Mean daily maximum °F (°C)	29.3 (−1.5)	35.6 (2.0)	47.0 (8.3)	55.8 (13.2)	64.6 (18.1)	71.6 (22.0)	83.0 (28.3)	82.5 (28.1)	72.9 (22.7)	58.0 (14.4)	40.4 (4.7)	30.0 (−1.1)	55.9 (13.3)
Daily mean °F (°C)	20.0 (−6.7)	24.3 (−4.3)	34.0 (1.1)	42.3 (5.7)	50.3 (10.2)	56.8 (13.8)	64.6 (18.1)	63.5 (17.5)	55.4 (13.0)	43.9 (6.6)	30.4 (−0.9)	20.8 (−6.2)	42.2 (5.7)
Mean daily minimum °F (°C)	10.6 (−11.9)	12.9 (−10.6)	21.0 (−6.1)	28.8 (−1.8)	35.9 (2.2)	41.9 (5.5)	46.2 (7.9)	44.4 (6.9)	37.9 (3.3)	29.8 (−1.2)	20.3 (−6.5)	11.5 (−11.4)	28.4 (−2.0)
Record low °F (°C)	−36 (−38)	−26 (−32)	−15 (−26)	8 (−13)	16 (−9)	25 (−4)	29 (−2)	21 (−6)	14 (−10)	0 (−18)	−20 (−29)	−36 (−38)	−36 (−38)
Average precipitation inches (mm)	1.96 (50)	1.31 (33)	1.24 (31)	1.37 (35)	1.76 (45)	1.93 (49)	1.04 (26)	1.02 (26)	1.02 (26)	1.02 (26)	1.73 (44)	2.03 (52)	17.43 (443)
Average snowfall inches (cm)	23.1 (59)	12.9 (33)	6.9 (18)	1.6 (4.1)	0.3 (0.76)	trace	0.0 (0.0)	0.0 (0.0)	0.1 (0.25)	0.5 (1.3)	13.3 (34)	24.2 (61)	82.9 (211.41)
Average precipitation days (≥ 0.01 in)	12.3	8.5	9.4	9.8	11.5	10.6	6.3	6.3	6.0	6.9	10.8	10.9	109.3
Average snowy days (≥ 0.1 in)	11.4	6.9	4.7	1.8	0.1	0.0	0.0	0.0	0.0	0.5	7.0	10.0	42.4
Source 1: NOAA (precip/precip days, snow/snow days 1981–2010)
Source 2: National Weather Service
