= Beaverhead Rock =

Historic rock formation in Montana, United States of America

- Beaverhead Rock-Lewis and Clark Expedition
- U.S. National Register of Historic Places
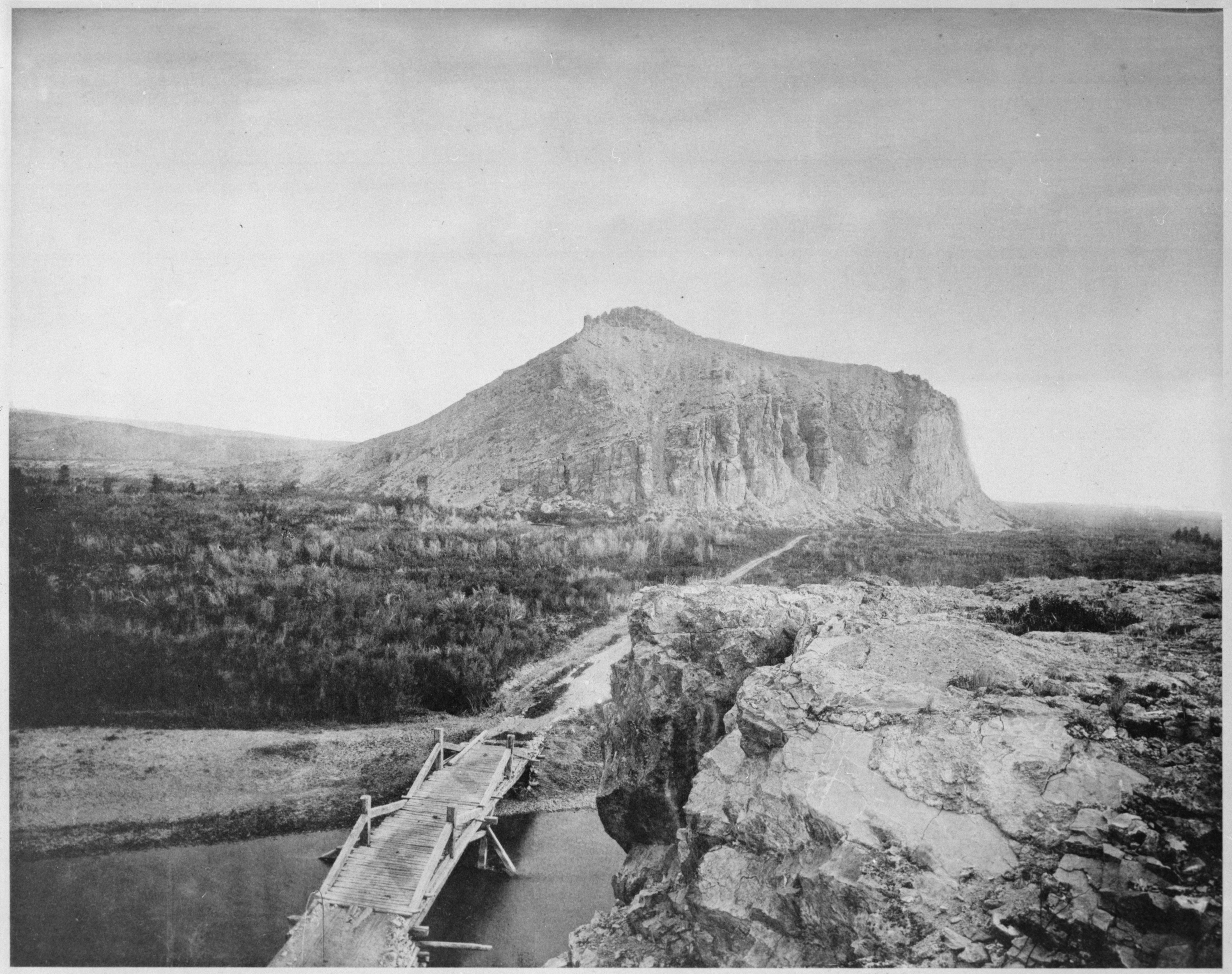
- Overland Trail bridge across Beaverhead River, with Beaverhead Rock—"Point of Rocks" in background (1871).

- Location within Montana Location within the United States
- Location: Madison County, Montana
- Nearest city: Dillon, Montana
- Coordinates: 45°23′11″N 112°27′35″W
- Built: 1805 (expedition)
- Website: Official website
- NRHP reference No.: 70000359
- Added to NRHP: February 11, 1970

Beaverhead Rock, also known as Point of Rocks, is a rock formation overlooking the Beaverhead River in Montana protected as Beaverhead Rock State Park. It is located on Montana State Highway 41, twelve miles (19 km) south of Twin Bridges, Madison County. It was added to the National Register of Historic Places in 1970. The site may be viewed and photographed from a distance, but is not directly accessible.

== History ==
Beaverhead Rock is a rock feature identified in 1805 by Sacagawea, during the Lewis and Clark Expedition, as a landmark not distant from the summer retreat of her nation. According to the Journal of Lewis:

The Indian woman recognized the point of a high plain to our right which she informed us was not very distant from the summer retreat of her nation on a river beyond the mountains which runs to the west. This hill she says her nation calls the Beaver's Head, from a conceived resemblance of its figure to the head of that animal...as it is now all important with us to meet with those people as soon as possible I determined to proceed tomorrow with a small party...and pass the mountains to the Columbia; and down that river until I found the Indians...without horses we shall be obliged to leave a great part of our stores...
