= Bannock Pass =

Mountain pass between Idaho and Montana

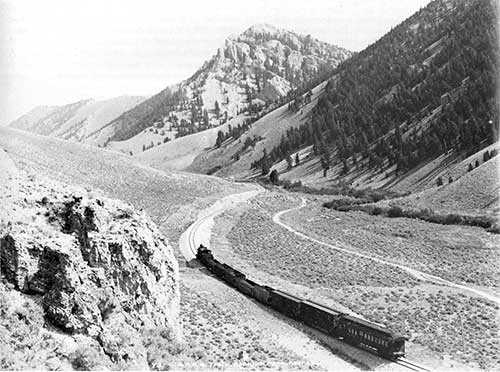
- Postcard photo of a Gilmore and Pittsburgh Railroad train ascending the west side of Bannock Pass, Lemhi County, Idaho.
- Interactive map of Bannock Pass
- Elevation: 7,684 ft (2,342 m)
- Traversed by: SH-29, S-324

Third Approach
- Location: Lemhi County, Idaho / Beaverhead County, Montana, United States
- Range: Rocky Mountains
- Coordinates: 44°48′52″N 113°16′19″W

Bannock Pass is a high mountain pass in the Beaverhead Mountains, part of the Bitterroot Range in the Rocky Mountains. The pass lies on the Montana-Idaho border on the Continental Divide, at an elevation of 7,684 feet (2,342 m) above sea level.

The pass is crossed by a road (Idaho State Highway 29 and Montana Secondary Highway 324) from Leadore, Idaho to Dillon, Montana.

Bannock Pass should not be confused with the similarly named Bannack Pass, about 33 miles (53 km) to the southeast, which is also in the Beaverhead Mountains, on the Montana-Idaho border, and on the Continental Divide, and which has virtually the same elevation (7,679 feet [2,341 m]).

== History ==
Bannock Pass is named for the Bannock Native American people.

In 1909 and 1910 the Gilmore and Pittsburgh Railroad was constructed through the area. In order to keep the grades manageable, the railroad used a switchback on each side of the ridge and bored a tunnel under the summit somewhat east of the current highway crossing. The railroad was abandoned in 1939.

== See also ==
- Mountain passes in Montana
