= Goldbug Hot Springs =

Thermal spring and recreation area

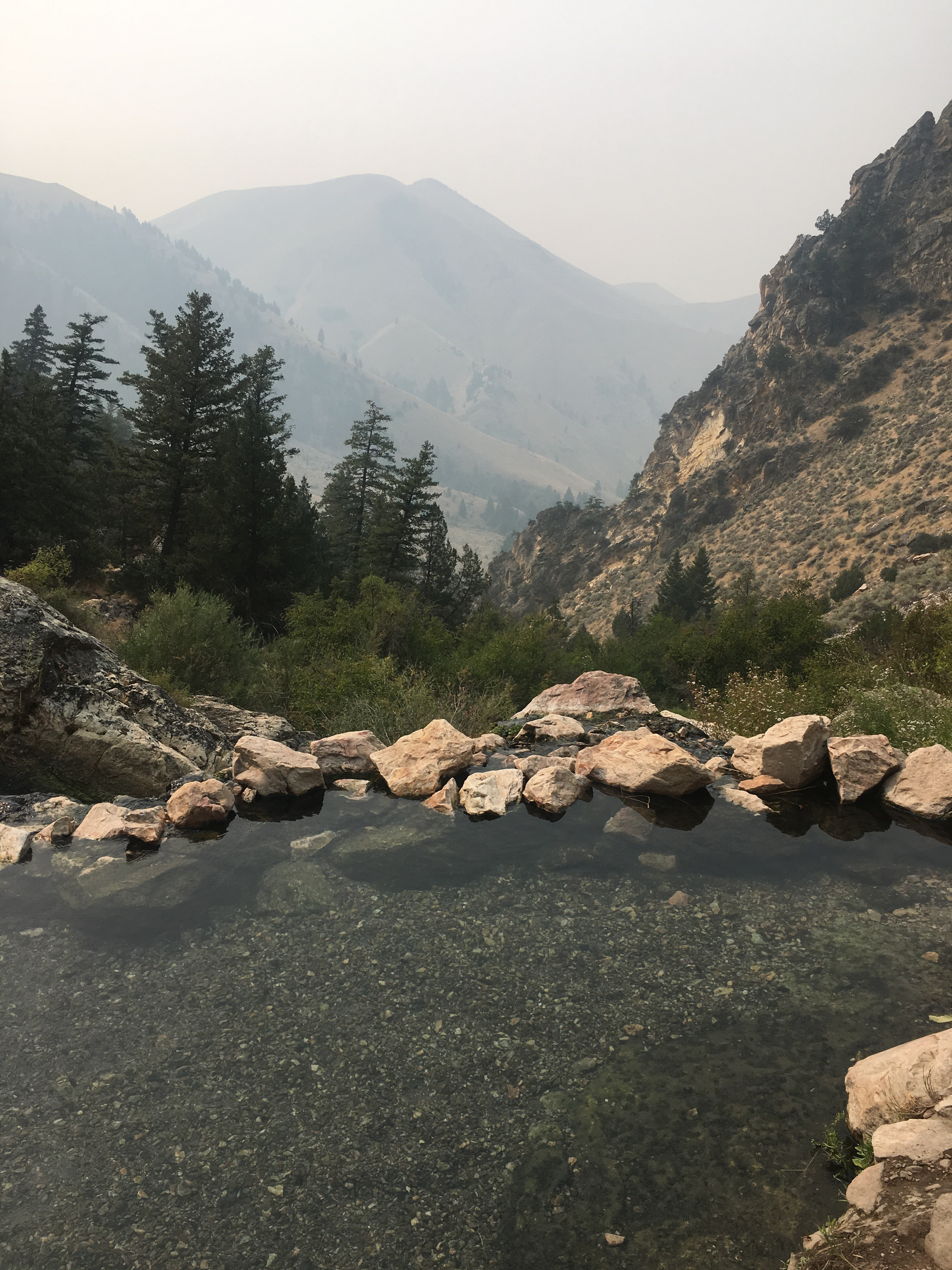
- Looking down from the top pool of Goldbug Hot Springs.
- Interactive map of Goldbug Hot Springs
- Location: Lemhi County, Idaho, United States
- Coordinates: 44.905°N 113.929°W
- Elevation: 6,200 feet (1,900 m)
- Type: Hot spring
- Temperature: 113 °F (45 °C)
- Topo map: USGS Goldbug Ridge

Goldbug Hot Springs is a hot spring located in the Salmon-Challis National Forest about 20 miles south of Salmon, Idaho. The spring is along Warm Spring Creek and there are about six waterfall-fed pools. Goldbug is listed as having a temperature of 113 °F (45 °C), but the temperature of the pools will vary depending on the time of year. The pools have a sand/gravel bottom and are dammed by boulders. Due to the hike and remoteness of the trailhead, it is not usually crowded.

Water from Goldbug Hot Springs flows into Warm Springs Creek, which flows into the Salmon River.

== Recreation ==
The trailhead for Goldbug Hot Springs can be accessed from a well maintained dirt road off US 93 near mile marker 282. The first .25 miles (0.40 km) of the trail is on private land that is part of a Bureau of Land Management easement. Hikers will experience 1,350 feet (410 m) in elevation gain along the 2 miles (3.2 km) hike. The trail is maintained with sturdy bridges, and there are sections where hikers will be climbing steps. The last .5 miles (0.80 km) of the hike is the steepest, and the trail continues beyond the hot spring itself.

Camping is prohibited at the trailhead, on the easement and within 500 feet (150 m) of the hot spring itself. Along the trail, however, there are numerous primitive campgrounds. There is also a campground above the highest pool along Warm Spring Creek. Overnight campers will enjoy almost zero light pollution.

The hot spring is free and open year-round. It is not unusual to find visitors skinny dipping.

== Weather ==
While the hot spring is open year-round, heavy snow in the winter may cause difficulties in accessing it. Temperatures in the pools will be rather chilly in the winter. Summertime temperatures can get extremely hot, and it is suggested that hikers bring extra water and sunblock with them.

Climate data for Salmon KSRA (1971–2000)
Month	Jan	Feb	Mar	Apr	May	Jun	Jul	Aug	Sep	Oct	Nov	Dec	Year
Mean daily maximum °F (°C)	28.4 (−2.0)	37.0 (2.8)	49.7 (9.8)	59.9 (15.5)	69.1 (20.6)	77.9 (25.5)	87.3 (30.7)	85.5 (29.7)	74.9 (23.8)	60.3 (15.7)	40.7 (4.8)	29.2 (−1.6)	58.3 (14.6)
Mean daily minimum °F (°C)	9.3 (−12.6)	15.2 (−9.3)	24.7 (−4.1)	31.8 (−0.1)	39.5 (4.2)	46.1 (7.8)	50.9 (10.5)	48.5 (9.2)	40.4 (4.7)	30.2 (−1.0)	21.0 (−6.1)	11.4 (−11.4)	30.8 (−0.7)
Average precipitation inches (mm)	0.68 (17)	0.49 (12)	0.54 (14)	0.79 (20)	1.42 (36)	1.42 (36)	1.03 (26)	0.82 (21)	0.77 (20)	0.65 (17)	0.73 (19)	0.78 (20)	10.12 (258)
Source: NOAA (normals, 1971–2000)

== Flora and Fauna ==
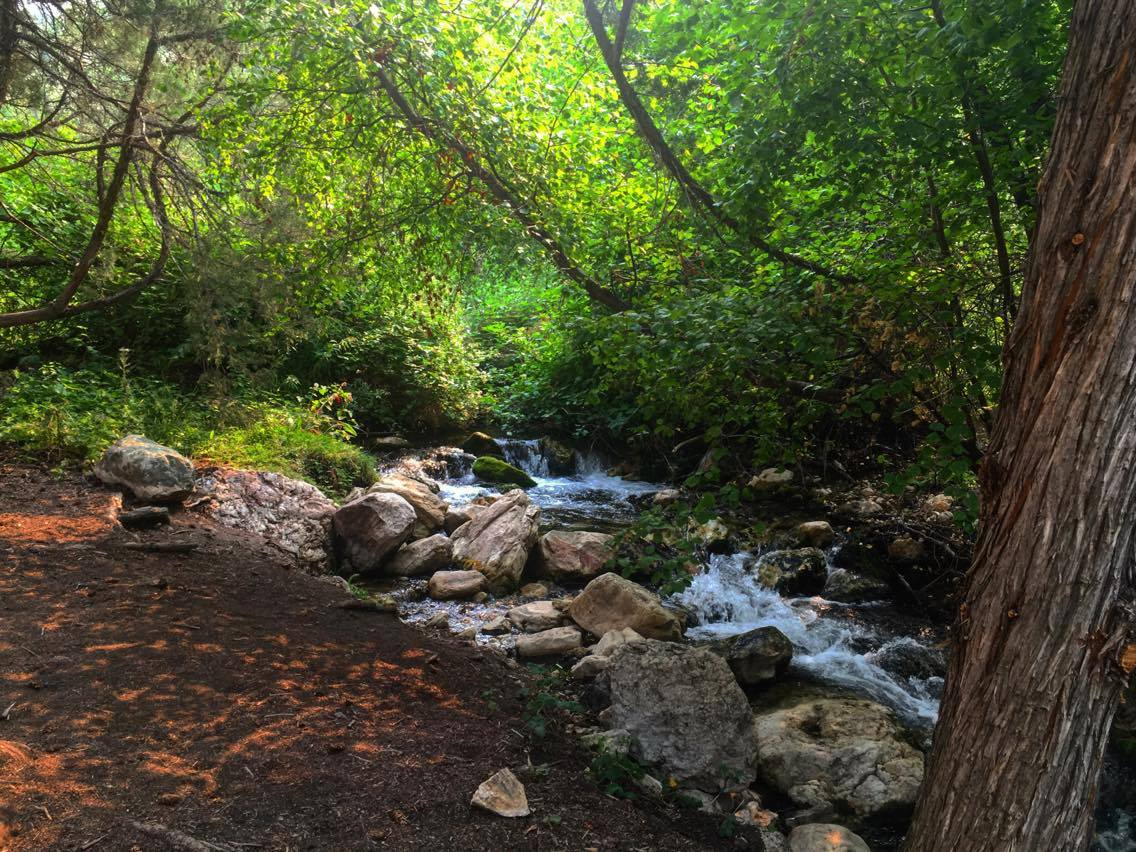
Warm Springs Creek downstream of the hot spring.

Plants and animals near Goldbug Hot Spring are what you would expect to see in the high desert. There are intermittent douglas fir and lodgepole pine trees along the riparian zone and in the higher elevations of the trail. Otherwise, sagebrush and native grasses are mixed in with the rocky terrain.

It is not unusual to see snakes in the area, including venomous rattlesnakes. Big game, such as Mule deer can be seen occasionally, along with rare black bears. Jackrabbits, badgers and other small game are fairly common.
