= Leadore School =

Location
- 111 South 3rd Street; Leadore, Idaho; United States; 44.677693°N 113.360988°W

Information
- Type: Public
- Motto: We may be small but we are STRONG!
- Established: 1918; 108 years ago
- School district: South Lemhi School District #292
- Principal: Shane Matson
- Staff: 12.76 (FTE)
- Grades: K–12
- Enrollment: 100 (2024–2025, K-12)
- Student to teacher ratio: 7.84
- Colors: Blue; White; Red
- Athletics conference: 1A Rocky Mountain Conference
- Mascot: Mustangs
- Accreditation: Northwest Accreditation Commission (Cognia)
- Website: www.leadoreschool.org

Leadore School is a grade K-12 Public School located in Leadore, Idaho.

== History ==
In the late 19th century, prior to Leadore's founding in 1910, there were several log one-room schoolhouses in the area. As Leadore became the area's economic center, a new brick high school was built in Leadore in 1918, replacing the smaller high school, 2 miles to the north, in Junction, Idaho. The new school featured two floors, a gymnasium, ten classrooms, auditorium and an electric light plant. The current school was built in 1956.

== Athletics ==
Leadore Mustangs compete in the 1A division, the smallest division in the Idaho High School Activities Association (IHSAA). They participate in the District V / VI Rocky Mountain Conference.

=== State championships ===
- Girls Basketball: 2001
- Girls Cross Country: 1974
