= Agency Creek (Idaho) =

Stream in Idaho, United States

Agency Creek Tributary to Lemhi River
- Location of Agency Creek mouth Agency Creek (Idaho) (the United States)

Location
- Country: United States
- State: Idaho
- County: Lemhi

Physical characteristics
- Source: Trail Creek divide
  - location: Lemhi Pass
  - coordinates: 44°58′24″N 113°26′48″W
  - elevation: 7,240 ft (2,210 m)
- Mouth: Lemhi River
  - location: Tendoy, Idaho
  - coordinates: 44°57′51″N 113°38′51″W
  - elevation: 4,829 ft (1,472 m)
- Length: 11.70 mi (18.83 km)
- Basin size: 44.50 square miles (115.3 km^{2})
- Discharge
  - location: Lemhi River
  - average: 16.44 cu ft/s (0.466 m^{3}/s) at mouth with Lemhi River

Basin features
- Progression: Lemhi River → Salmon River → Snake River → Columbia River → Pacific Ocean
- River system: Columbia River
- Tributaries
  - left: White Creek; Sharkey Creek; Cow Creek
  - right: Horseshoe Bend Creek; Flume Creek
- Bridges: Lewis and Clark Highway, Lemhi Road

Agency Creek is a stream in the U.S. state of Idaho. It is a tributary of the Lemhi River.

Agency Creek was named for an Indian agency near its course.

== Course ==
Agency Creek rises on the west side of Lemhi Pass and then flows westerly to join the Lemhi River at Tendoy, Idaho.

== Watershed ==
Agency Creek drains 44.50 square miles (115.3 km^{2}) of area, receives about 20.2 in/year of precipitation, has a wetness index of 290.19, and is about 32% forested.
