= May, Idaho =

Unincorporated community in the state of Idaho, United States

- Unincorporated community
- Location within Idaho Location within the United States
- Coordinates: 44°36′16″N 113°54′43″W
- Country: United States
- State: Idaho
- County: Lemhi
- Elevation: 5,069 ft (1,545 m)
- Time zone: UTC-7 (Mountain (MST))
  - Summer (DST): UTC-6 (MDT)
- ZIP code: 83253
- Area codes: 208, 986
- GNIS feature ID: 386551

May is an unincorporated community in Lemhi County, Idaho, United States, located 39 miles (63 km) south of Salmon near the Pahsimeroi River. May has the post office serving ZIP code 83253.

== History ==
May was named by the wife of Rudolph Wright, who established a post office there in 1897. Highway traffic through the area supported a small number of businesses on the main street, but these were later bypassed and sit unused today. Patterson Elementary School, located to the southeast, serves the community. May Airport, an unattended turf airstrip northeast of the town, has been active since 1950.

May's population was 60 in 1960.

== Climate ==
This climatic region is typified by large seasonal temperature differences, with warm to hot (and often humid) summers and cold (sometimes severely cold) winters. According to the Köppen Climate Classification system, May has a humid continental climate, abbreviated "Dfb" on climate maps.
