= Clark Canyon Dam =

- Clark Canyon Reservoir

- Location within Montana
- Country: United States
- Location: Beaverhead County, Montana
- Coordinates: 45°00′00″N 112°51′25″W
- Construction began: 1961
- Opening date: 1964

Dam and spillways
- Type of dam: Earthfill
- Impounds: Beaverhead River
- Height: 147.5 ft (45.0 m)
- Length: 2,950 ft (900 m)
- Elevation at crest: 5,578 ft (1,700 m)
- Dam volume: 1,970,000 yd^{3} (1,510,000 m^{3})
- Spillways: Uncontrolled overflow
- Spillway capacity: 9,520 cu ft/s (270 m^{3}/s)

Reservoir
- Creates: Clark Canyon Reservoir
- Total capacity: 325,324 acre⋅ft (0.401281 km^{3})
- Surface area: 5,903 acres (2,389 ha)

Power Station
- Hydraulic head: 113.9 ft (34.7 m)
- Installed capacity: None

Clark Canyon Dam is an earthfill dam located in Beaverhead County, Montana, about 20 miles (32 km) south of the county seat of Dillon. The dam impounds the waters of the Beaverhead River, creating a body of water known as Clark Canyon Reservoir. The structure was constructed in 1961-1964 by the United States Bureau of Reclamation, to hold water for downstream irrigation and for flood control purposes.

Clark Canyon Dam has a crest length of 2,950 feet (900 m), and a maximum height of 147 feet (45 m). The dam contains 1,970,000 cubic yards (1,510,000 m³) of material. The elevation of the dam crest is 5,578 feet (1,700 m). The reservoir has a total capacity of 325,324 acre-feet (401,281,000 m^{3}), and when full has a surface area of 5,903 acres (23.89 km^{2}).

Camp Fortunate Overlook sign at the Clark Canyon Reservoir near Dillon, Montana

Construction of the dam and reservoir required the relocation of U.S. Route 91 (rebuilt as Interstate 15) and a main line of the Union Pacific Railroad. The reservoir inundated the former site of the small community of Armstead, Montana, and the site of Camp Fortunate, where the Lewis and Clark Expedition camped from August 17 to 22, 1805 and held negotiations with the Shoshone.

== Fishing ==
Fishing is a popular activity on the reservoir created by the dam. The reservoir is regularly stocked with fish.

Fish species within the lake
| Species | Family | Class | Native to MT |
|---|---|---|---|
| Brook Trout | Trout | Coldwater | Introduced |
| Brown Trout | Trout | Coldwater | Introduced |
| Burbot | Codfish | Coldwater | Native |
| Common Carp | Minnow | Warmwater | Introduced |
| Longnose Sucker | Sucker | Warmwater | Native |
| Mountain Whitefish | Trout | Coldwater | Native |
| Rainbow Trout | Trout | Coldwater | Introduced |
| White Sucker | Sucker | Warmwater | Native |
