= Gilmore, Idaho =

Unincorporated community in the state of Idaho, United States

Coordinates: 44°27′32″N 113°16′11″W

Gilmore is an unincorporated community in Lemhi County, in the U.S. state of Idaho.

== History ==
A post office called Gilmore was established in 1902, and remained in operation until 1957. The community was named after John T. "Jack" Gilmer, a businessperson in the stage coach industry (a postal error accounts for the error in spelling, which was never corrected).

Gilmore's population was 50 in 1909, and was just 5 in 1960.

== Geography and climate ==
Meadow Lake is in the Lehmi Mountains, situated near Portland Mountain (Idaho), roughly 2.5 miles (4 km) west of Gilmore. The lake can be accessed from Gilmore along Forest Service Road #002, which goes up the Meadow Lake Creek valley. Meadow Lake has a subalpine climate (Köppen Dfc), with long, cold winters and short, mild summers.

Climate data for Meadow Lake, Idaho, 1991–2020 normals, 1989-2020 extremes: 9150ft (2789m)
Month	Jan	Feb	Mar	Apr	May	Jun	Jul	Aug	Sep	Oct	Nov	Dec	Year
Record high °F (°C)	51 (11)	57 (14)	59 (15)	61 (16)	71 (22)	79 (26)	84 (29)	81 (27)	79 (26)	70 (21)	55 (13)	52 (11)	84 (29)
Mean maximum °F (°C)	41.7 (5.4)	43.2 (6.2)	47.3 (8.5)	55.0 (12.8)	63.3 (17.4)	69.8 (21.0)	76.1 (24.5)	75.2 (24.0)	70.3 (21.3)	59.2 (15.1)	47.1 (8.4)	39.6 (4.2)	77.3 (25.2)
Mean daily maximum °F (°C)	27.0 (−2.8)	27.7 (−2.4)	33.6 (0.9)	39.7 (4.3)	48.6 (9.2)	56.1 (13.4)	66.9 (19.4)	65.8 (18.8)	56.2 (13.4)	43.0 (6.1)	31.5 (−0.3)	25.2 (−3.8)	43.4 (6.4)
Daily mean °F (°C)	20.2 (−6.6)	20.2 (−6.6)	25.1 (−3.8)	30.1 (−1.1)	39.0 (3.9)	46.4 (8.0)	56.4 (13.6)	55.6 (13.1)	47.2 (8.4)	35.1 (1.7)	24.7 (−4.1)	18.7 (−7.4)	34.9 (1.6)
Mean daily minimum °F (°C)	13.5 (−10.3)	12.6 (−10.8)	16.5 (−8.6)	20.5 (−6.4)	29.4 (−1.4)	36.7 (2.6)	45.9 (7.7)	45.4 (7.4)	38.0 (3.3)	27.1 (−2.7)	18.0 (−7.8)	12.2 (−11.0)	26.3 (−3.2)
Mean minimum °F (°C)	−5.1 (−20.6)	−5.7 (−20.9)	0.4 (−17.6)	6.0 (−14.4)	14.3 (−9.8)	24.0 (−4.4)	35.0 (1.7)	32.2 (0.1)	21.3 (−5.9)	8.3 (−13.2)	−0.8 (−18.2)	−6.2 (−21.2)	−13.2 (−25.1)
Record low °F (°C)	−25 (−32)	−19 (−28)	−9 (−23)	−2 (−19)	4 (−16)	14 (−10)	26 (−3)	17 (−8)	9 (−13)	−13 (−25)	−17 (−27)	−25 (−32)	−25 (−32)
Average precipitation inches (mm)	2.67 (68)	2.54 (65)	3.13 (80)	3.87 (98)	3.81 (97)	3.03 (77)	1.11 (28)	1.25 (32)	1.65 (42)	2.47 (63)	2.53 (64)	3.14 (80)	31.2 (794)
Source 1: XMACIS2
Source 2: NOAA (Precipitation)
