= Beaverhead River =

River in Montana, United States of America

Beaverhead
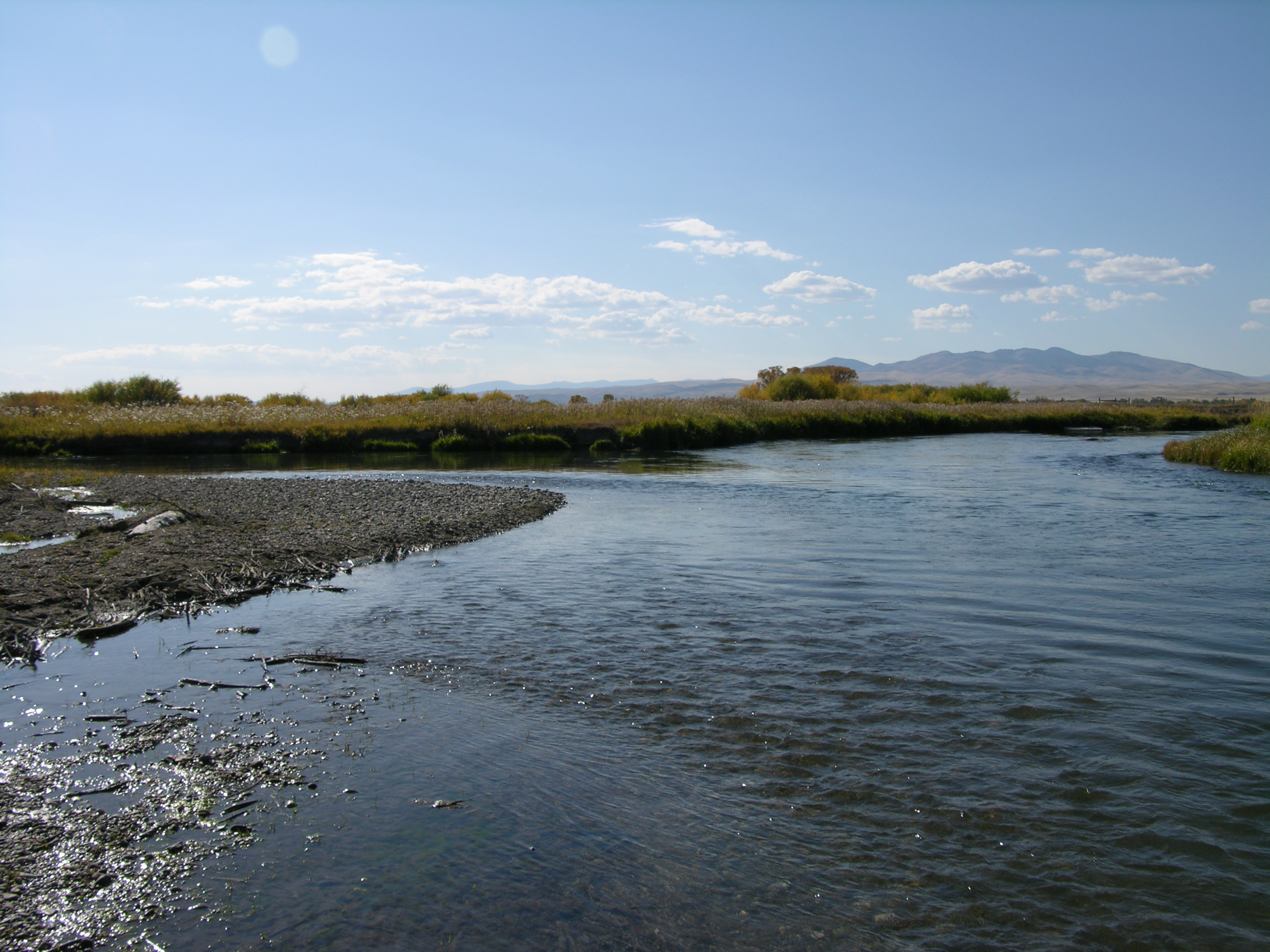
- The confluence of the Beaverhead and the Ruby River, its major tributary

- Location of the mouth within Montana

Location
- Country: United States
- State: Montana
- City: Dillon & Twin Bridges

Physical characteristics
- Source: Clark Canyon Reservoir
  - location: Confluence of Red Rock River and Horse Prairie Creek
  - coordinates: 45°00′01″N 112°51′32″W
  - elevation: 5,545 ft (1,690 m)
- Mouth: Jefferson River
  - location: Near Twin Bridges, MT
  - coordinates: 45°34′04″N 112°20′19″W
  - elevation: 4,610 ft (1,410 m)
- Length: 69 mi (111 km), Southwest-northeast
- Basin size: 4,778 sq mi (12,370 km^{2})
- Discharge
  - average: 371 cu ft/s (10.5 m^{3}/s)
  - minimum: 0 cu ft/s (0 m^{3}/s)
  - maximum: 3,130 cu ft/s (89 m^{3}/s)

Basin features
- River system: Jefferson River
- Tributaries
  - left: Horse Prairie Creek, Grasshopper Creek
  - right: Red Rock River, Ruby River

The Beaverhead River is an approximately 69-mile-long (111 km) tributary of the Jefferson River in southwest Montana (east of the Continental Divide). It drains an area of roughly 4,778 square miles (12,370 km^{2}). The river's original headwaters, formed by the confluence of the Red Rock River and Horse Prairie Creek, are now flooded under Clark Canyon Reservoir, which also floods the first 6 miles (9.7 km) of the river. The Beaverhead then flows through a broad valley northward to join the Big Hole River and form the Jefferson River. With the Red Rock River included in its length, the river stretches another 70 miles (110 km), for a total length of 139 miles (224 km), one of the more significant drainages of south-western Montana.

The name of the Beaverhead originates from Beaverhead Rock on the middle river. This rock formation was recognized by Sacajawea when the Lewis and Clark Expedition passed the area in 1805. There were also many beavers in the area at the time, but the name does not originate from the animal. In 1805, Captain Meriwether Lewis traveled up the Jefferson and Beaverhead first, but when the rest of the expedition came, a sign Lewis had left at the confluence of the Beaverhead and Big Hole telling them to follow the Beaverhead had been cut down by a beaver, and the expedition traveled up the Big Hole instead. As a result, the swifter current of the Big Hole swamped two of their canoes before they could travel back down to the confluence.

Together with the Red Rock River, the Beaverhead forms the uppermost headwaters of the Missouri River, the longest tributary of the Mississippi River.

The river is a Class I water from the Clark Canyon Dam to its confluence with the Jefferson River for the purposes of public access for recreational purposes.

Drone Shot of Beaverhead River

== See also ==
- Montana Stream Access Law
- List of rivers of Montana
