= Lemhi County, Idaho =

County in Idaho, United States

- County
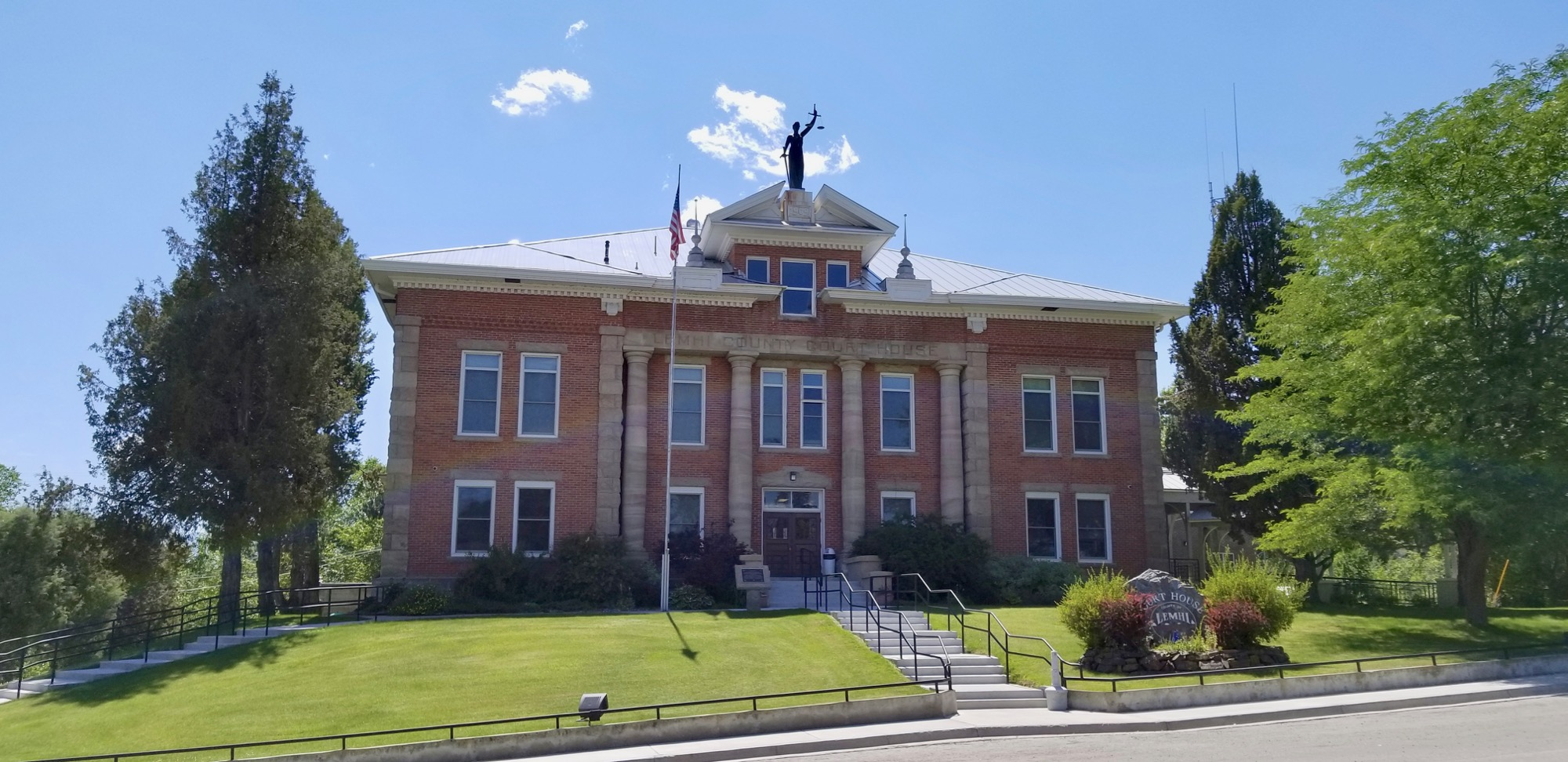
- Lemhi County Courthouse in Salmon

- Seal

- Location within the U.S. state of Idaho
- Coordinates: 44°58′N 113°57′W
- Country: United States
- State: Idaho
- Founded: January 9, 1869
- Named for: Fort Lemhi
- Seat: Salmon
- Largest city: Salmon

Area
  - Total: 4,569 sq mi (11,830 km^{2})
  - Land: 4,563 sq mi (11,820 km^{2})
  - Water: 5.4 sq mi (14 km^{2}) 0.1%

Population (2020)
  - Total: 7,974
  - Estimate (2025): 8,474 ▲
  - Density: 1.748/sq mi (0.6747/km^{2})
- Time zone: UTC−7 (Mountain)
  - Summer (DST): UTC−6 (MDT)
- Congressional district: 2nd
- Website: www.lemhicountyidaho.org

Lemhi County is a county located in the U.S. state of Idaho. As of the 2020 census, the population was 7,974. The largest city and county seat is Salmon. The county was established in 1869 and named after Fort Lemhi (or Limhi), a remote Mormon missionary settlement from 1855 to 1858 on Bannock and Shoshone territory.

== Geography ==
According to the U.S. Census Bureau, the county has a total area of 4,569 square miles (11,830 km^{2}), of which 4,563 square miles (11,820 km^{2}) is land and 5.4 square miles (14 km^{2}) (0.1%) is water. It is the fourth-largest county in Idaho by area. The highest point is Bell Mountain at 11,612 ft (3,539 m) above sea level, and the lowest point is the Salmon River as it exits on the county's western border with Idaho County at approximately 3,000 feet (910 m). The river cuts through the center of Lemhi County before turning west. The county's eastern border with Beaverhead County, Montana, is the Continental Divide.

=== Adjacent counties ===
- Idaho County, Idaho – northwest/Pacific Time border
- Ravalli County, Montana – north
- Beaverhead County, Montana – northeast
- Clark County, Idaho – east
- Butte County, Idaho – south
- Custer County, Idaho – southwest
- Valley County, Idaho – west

=== National protected areas ===
- Challis National Forest (part)
- Salmon National Forest (part)
- Targhee National Forest (part)
- Frank Church—River of No Return Wilderness (part)

== History ==
=== Native settlement ===
Habitation of the Lemhi and Salmon Rivers dates back 14,000 years ago. Early natives were spear hunters of big game. The Salmon River was the dividing point among the first cultural split which occurred after 5,000 BC. The Lemhi band of Shoshoni developed culturally in similar fashion to other Shoshoni tribes located south of and east of the Salmon River. The Lemhi band of Shoshoni gained early access to horses and had developed into a migratory culture. They were also known as "Salmon Eaters". Their migratory pattern consisted of fishing for salmon in the Lemhi Valley in the summer, digging camas on Camas Creek in the spring, and hunting buffalo in the Three Forks area of the Missouri River. They were also known to travel to trade with other tribes. The Lemhi band was forced to a reservation on February 12, 1875, even though the tribe failed to ratify the treaty creating it in 1868. The reservation was disbanded in 1907 and the tribe sent to Fort Hall.

=== Exploration and early settlement ===
The Lewis and Clark Expedition entered Idaho on August 12, 1805, at Lemhi Pass in present-day Lemhi County. Meriwether Lewis and three other members of the expedition were the first Americans of European descent to enter what is now Idaho. For Sacajawea, their guide and interpreter, the Lemhi Valley was her birthplace and her brother was the Chief of the Lemhi band. Clark went out to scout the expedition's route. Within a month, travel down the Salmon and Snake Rivers was ruled out and the expedition headed for Lolo Pass on the Bitterroot Range. Michael Bourdon of the Hudson's Bay Company established the Lemhi Valley as a base of trapping operations in 1822. The region would support trapping operations for about 20 years. Finnan McDonald, Alexander Ross, David Skene Ogden, Jedediah Smith, and Jim Bridger all spent time in the area. Exploration of the full Salmon River from its source to the Snake River did not occur until 1832. Mormon settlers established Fort Lemhi from 1855 to 1858. The settlement was withdrawn after a native attack on the settlement. The first gold miners ventured into Lemhi County in 1862, with miners working the main Salmon River all the way from Salmon down to Slate Creek.

=== Mining settlements ===
F.B. Sharkey and his party struck gold at Leesburg on July 16, 1866. The rush to Leesburg ensued within a month. A stagecoach route was established from Montana in May 1867 to the present location of Salmon City. Additional discovery of gold occurred at Lemhi in 1867 and Shoup in 1868. Salmon City became the county seat of Lemhi County when it was formed in 1869. Additional mining operations occurred at Yellow Jacket in 1869, Gibbonsville in 1877, Gilmore in 1880, Blackbird in 1892, and Leadore in 1904. The Gilmore and Pittsburgh Railroad was completed from Dubois to Salmon on May 18, 1910. The railroad was built to access ore from Gilmore. The railroad ceased operations in 1940.

=== Development of cities ===
Salmon City was platted in 1867. While Salmon has gone by the name Salmon City since its inception, it did not have legal status as a city until around 1900.

Leadore and Patterson were incorporated as villages in 1947. Patterson was disincorporated by 1980.

=== County-boundary history ===
At the start of mining operations in present-day Lemhi County in 1862, the region was fully within Idaho County, Washington Territory. Boise County was created in 1863, with its northern boundary running just north of the ridge dividing Birch Creek) from the Lemhi River. Under Idaho Territory, the southern portion became part of Alturas County on February 2, 1864, and the dividing line between Alturas and Idaho Counties was adjusted to 44° 30′ North latitude. The Idaho territorial legislature actually created Lemhi County twice. The first occasion was on December 21, 1866. A county government was organized at Salmon City, yet the bill approving the county was misplaced and never published in session laws. The following session, the legislature passed the bill again, officially creating Lemhi County on January 9, 1869. The county government was reorganized at Salmon City on February 22, 1870. The western and southern county boundaries for Lemhi were problematic and adjusted frequently. At its creation, Lemhi inherited Idaho County's southern and eastern boundaries, which effectively created two areas of noncontiguous territory, with one of the sections containing territory along the Salt Lake to Virginia City stagecoach route just north of the present town of Humphrey, Idaho. Finalization of the southern boundary came in several steps from 1885 to 1896. In 1885, the boundary was moved southward, gaining territory in present Clark County, creating a contiguous boundary, and leaving a 6-by-25.5-mile (9.7 by 41.0 km) stretch of the Birch Creek Area in Alturas County. The eastern 6-by-9-mile (9.7 by 14.5 km) portion of that territory was transferred from Alturas to Bingham in 1889. A change in 1891 extended the boundary south to its present location and added territory presently in Clark County. With legislative approval, voters in that territory voted to become part of Fremont County in 1896, finalizing the southern and eastern boundary. At Lemhi's creation, the western boundary was a line drawn from the Bitterroot Mountains to the southern line of Idaho County. The boundary was moved westward to the divide between the Payette and Salmon Rivers in 1873, moved eastward to a line drawn through the confluence of the Middle Fork and main Salmon rivers in 1885, and then mistakenly extended to the northern line of Idaho County in 1903 before being finalized at its present location in 1911. Custer County was partitioned from Lemhi in 1881 with its initial boundary excluding the Loon Creek area. The Loon Creek area was transferred back to Idaho County in 1885.

== Demographics ==
Historical population
Census	Pop.	Note	%±
1870	988		—
1880	2,230		125.7%
1890	1,915		−14.1%
1900	3,446		79.9%
1910	4,786		38.9%
1920	5,164		7.9%
1930	4,643		−10.1%
1940	6,521		40.4%
1950	6,278		−3.7%
1960	5,816		−7.4%
1970	5,566		−4.3%
1980	7,460		34.0%
1990	6,899		−7.5%
2000	7,806		13.1%
2010	7,936		1.7%
2020	7,974		0.5%
2025 (est.)	8,474	▲	6.3%
U.S. Decennial Census; 1790–1960 1900–1990; 1990–2000 2010–2020 2020

=== Racial and ethnic composition ===
Lemhi County, Idaho – Racial and ethnic composition Note: the US Census treats Hispanic/Latino as an ethnic category. This table excludes Latinos from the racial categories and assigns them to a separate category. Hispanics/Latinos may be of any race.
Race / Ethnicity (NH = Non-Hispanic)	Pop 1980	Pop 1990	Pop 2000	Pop 2010	Pop 2020	% 1980	% 1990	% 2000	% 2010	% 2020
White alone (NH)	7,303	6,692	7,452	7,543	7,280	97.90%	97.00%	95.47%	95.05%	91.30%
Black or African American alone (NH)	2	0	8	16	17	0.03%	0.00%	0.10%	0.20%	0.21%
Native American or Alaska Native alone (NH)	46	44	41	49	46	0.62%	0.64%	0.53%	0.62%	0.58%
Asian alone (NH)	7	23	14	29	28	0.09%	0.33%	0.18%	0.37%	0.35%
Native Hawaiian or Pacific Islander alone (NH)	x	x	3	3	6	x	x	0.04%	0.04%	0.08%
Other race alone (NH)	4	0	10	1	38	0.05%	0.00%	0.13%	0.01%	0.48%
Mixed race or Multiracial (NH)	x	x	108	114	264	x	x	1.38%	1.44%	3.31%
Hispanic or Latino (any race)	98	140	170	181	295	1.31%	2.03%	2.18%	2.28%	3.70%
Total	7,460	6,899	7,806	7,936	7,974	100.00%	100.00%	100.00%	100.00%	100.00%

=== 2020 census ===
As of the 2020 census, the county had a population of 7,974. The median age was 52.6 years. 18.9% of residents were under the age of 18 and 30.9% of residents were 65 years of age or older. For every 100 females there were 101.6 males, and for every 100 females age 18 and over there were 100.4 males age 18 and over.

The racial makeup of the county was 92.6% White, 0.2% Black or African American, 0.7% American Indian and Alaska Native, 0.5% Asian, 0.1% Native Hawaiian and Pacific Islander, 1.2% from some other race, and 4.7% from two or more races. Hispanic or Latino residents of any race comprised 3.7% of the population.

0.0% of residents lived in urban areas, while 100.0% lived in rural areas.

There were 3,651 households in the county, of which 21.2% had children under the age of 18 living with them and 23.3% had a female householder with no spouse or partner present. About 33.2% of all households were made up of individuals and 18.9% had someone living alone who was 65 years of age or older.

There were 4,568 housing units, of which 20.1% were vacant. Among occupied housing units, 76.9% were owner-occupied and 23.1% were renter-occupied. The homeowner vacancy rate was 2.3% and the rental vacancy rate was 4.3%.

=== 2010 census ===
As of the 2010 United States census, there were 7,936 people, 3,576 households, and 2,267 families living in the county. The population density was 1.7 inhabitants per square mile (0.66/km^{2}). There were 4,729 housing units at an average density of 1.0 units per square mile (0.39 units/km^{2}). The racial makeup of the county was 96.4% white, 0.7% American Indian, 0.4% Asian, 0.2% black or African American, 0.6% from other races, and 1.6% from two or more races. Those of Hispanic or Latino origin made up 2.3% of the population. In terms of ancestry, 25.9% were German, 22.4% were English, 13.0% were Irish, 9.9% were American, and 6.2% were Swedish.

Of the 3,576 households, 22.9% had children under the age of 18 living with them, 52.7% were married couples living together, 6.9% had a female householder with no husband present, 36.6% were non-families, and 31.7% of all households were made up of individuals. The average household size was 2.20 and the average family size was 2.74. The median age was 49.7 years.

The median income for a household in the county was $36,411 and the median income for a family was $49,119. Males had a median income of $37,763 versus $21,233 for females. The per capita income for the county was $21,699. About 13.0% of families and 20.0% of the population were below the poverty line, including 36.3% of those under age 18 and 8.3% of those age 65 or over.

=== 2000 census ===
As of the census of 2000, there were 7,806 people, 3,275 households, and 2,217 families living in the county. The population density was 2 people per square mile (0.77 people/km^{2}). There were 4,154 housing units at an average density of 1 units per square mile (0.39 units/km^{2}). The racial makeup of the county was 96.63% White, 0.10% Black or African American, 0.60% Native American, 0.18% Asian, 0.04% Pacific Islander, 0.77% from other races, and 1.68% from two or more races. 2.18% of the population were Hispanic or Latino of any race. 19.5% were of German, 18.0% English, 11.4% American and 6.5% Irish ancestry.

There were 3,275 households, out of which 28.60% had children under the age of 18 living with them, 57.80% were married couples living together, 6.90% had a female householder with no husband present, and 32.30% were non-families. 27.70% of all households were made up of individuals, and 12.40% had someone living alone who was 65 years of age or older. The average household size was 2.38 and the average family size was 2.91.

In the county, the population was spread out, with 25.50% under the age of 18, 5.50% from 18 to 24, 22.70% from 25 to 44, 29.50% from 45 to 64, and 16.80% who were 65 years of age or older. The median age was 43 years. For every 100 females there were 99.20 males. For every 100 females age 18 and over, there were 97.50 males.

The median income for a household in the county was $30,185, and the median income for a family was $35,261. Males had a median income of $30,558 versus $18,289 for females. The per capita income for the county was $16,037. About 10.60% of families and 15.30% of the population were below the poverty line, including 19.80% of those under age 18 and 10.30% of those age 65 or over.

== Communities ==
=== Cities ===
- Leadore
- Salmon

=== Unincorporated communities ===
- Carmen
- Cobalt
- Elk Bend
- Gibbonsville
- Lemhi
- May
- North Fork
- Patterson
- Shoup
- Tendoy

== Politics ==
Like all of southeastern Idaho, Lemhi County has long been powerfully Republican. In no presidential election since 1940 has the county selected the Democratic nominee, and the last Democrat to pass 30 percent of the county's vote was Michael Dukakis in 1988.

Lemhi County was the only county to never support Cecil Andrus in any of his gubernatorial campaigns.

United States presidential election results for Lemhi County, Idaho
Year	Republican		Democratic		Third party(ies)	
Year	No.	%	No.	%	No.	%
1892	330	57.39%	0	0.00%	245	42.61%
1896	202	15.92%	1,065	83.92%	2	0.16%
1900	523	36.83%	897	63.17%	0	0.00%
1904	786	55.43%	564	39.77%	68	4.80%
1908	809	48.88%	777	46.95%	69	4.17%
1912	669	33.47%	910	45.52%	420	21.01%
1916	723	38.38%	1,080	57.32%	81	4.30%
1920	1,289	64.71%	699	35.09%	4	0.20%
1924	1,005	54.38%	442	23.92%	401	21.70%
1928	1,139	57.12%	837	41.98%	18	0.90%
1932	793	36.59%	1,332	61.47%	42	1.94%
1936	943	35.37%	1,648	61.82%	75	2.81%
1940	1,412	45.89%	1,664	54.08%	1	0.03%
1944	1,048	51.37%	988	48.43%	4	0.20%
1948	1,037	53.51%	864	44.58%	37	1.91%
1952	2,100	71.19%	848	28.75%	2	0.07%
1956	1,794	63.35%	1,038	36.65%	0	0.00%
1960	1,355	51.36%	1,283	48.64%	0	0.00%
1964	1,496	58.37%	1,067	41.63%	0	0.00%
1968	1,476	57.61%	547	21.35%	539	21.04%
1972	1,812	61.99%	526	18.00%	585	20.01%
1976	1,685	56.37%	1,159	38.78%	145	4.85%
1980	2,646	71.53%	794	21.47%	259	7.00%
1984	2,810	75.78%	852	22.98%	46	1.24%
1988	2,378	66.24%	1,157	32.23%	55	1.53%
1992	1,540	40.30%	996	26.07%	1,285	33.63%
1996	2,334	60.34%	1,015	26.24%	519	13.42%
2000	2,859	78.52%	660	18.13%	122	3.35%
2004	3,079	75.93%	915	22.56%	61	1.50%
2008	2,938	71.57%	1,061	25.85%	106	2.58%
2012	3,029	73.70%	960	23.36%	121	2.94%
2016	3,011	73.51%	733	17.90%	352	8.59%
2020	3,592	75.80%	1,032	21.78%	115	2.43%
2024	3,716	76.24%	1,038	21.30%	120	2.46%

=== Governance ===
The Lehmi County Sheriff's Office provides law enforcement duties in the county. It consists of 13 patrolmen and 16 corrections officers. According to ODMP, 4 officers of the Lehmi County Sheriff's Office have been killed in the line of duty.

== Education ==
There are three school districts served by two high schools: Salmon High School and Leadore High School. The school districts are:

- Challis Joint School District 181 (also part of Custer County
- Salmon School District 291
- South Lemhi School District 292

College of Eastern Idaho in Idaho Falls includes Lemhi County in its catchment zone; however this county is not in its taxation zone.

== See also ==
- National Register of Historic Places listings in Lemhi County, Idaho
- County Parcel Map
